= 51st Wisconsin Legislature =

Wisconsin legislative term for 1913–1914

| ← | 50th | 52nd | → |
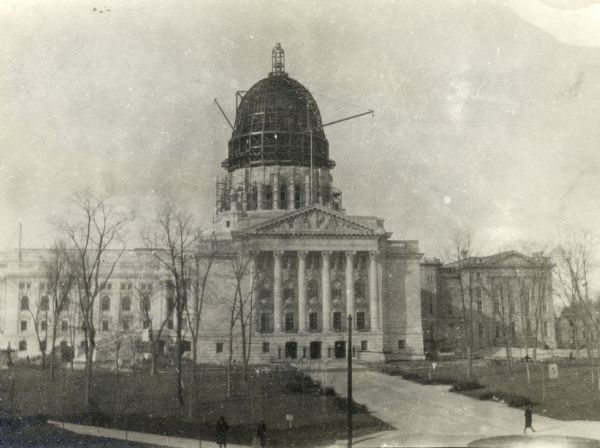
- Wisconsin State Capitol reconstruction close to completion

Overview
- Legislative body: Wisconsin Legislature
- Meeting place: Wisconsin State Capitol
- Term: January 6, 1913 – January 4, 1915
- Election: November 5, 1912

Senate
- Members: 33
- Senate President: Thomas Morris (R)
- President pro tempore: Harry C. Martin (R)
- Party control: Republican

Assembly
- Members: 100
- Assembly Speaker: Merlin Hull (R)
- Party control: Republican

Sessions
- 1st: January 8, 1913 – August 9, 1913

The Fifty-First Wisconsin Legislature convened from January 8, 1913, to August 9, 1913, in regular session. During this term, legislative business was largely held in the north wing of the Wisconsin State Capitol, which was the only part of the capitol to remain intact after the 1904 fire.

This was the first legislative session after the redistricting of the Senate and Assembly according to an act of the previous session.

Senators representing even-numbered districts were newly elected for this session and were serving the first two years of a four-year term. Assembly members were elected to a two-year term. Assembly members and even-numbered senators were elected in the general election of November 5, 1912. Senators representing odd-numbered districts were serving the third and fourth year of a four-year term, having been elected in the general election of November 8, 1910.

The governor of Wisconsin during this entire term was Republican Francis E. McGovern, of Milwaukee County, serving his second two-year term, having won re-election in the 1912 Wisconsin gubernatorial election.

== Major events ==
- March 4, 1913: Inauguration of Woodrow Wilson as the 28th President of the United States
- November 6–11, 1913: The Great Lakes Storm of 1913 resulted in more than 250 deaths and the destruction of 19 ships.
- December 23, 1913: President Woodrow Wilson signed the Federal Reserve Act into law, creating the Federal Reserve System.
- January 7, 1914: First ship to transit the completed Panama Canal.
- April 21, 1914: The United States began an occupation of Veracruz, Mexico, in response to the Tampico Affair, leading to a break in diplomatic relations.
- June 28, 1914: Archduke Franz Ferdinand of Austria, heir-presumptive to the throne of Austria-Hungary, was assassinated in Sarajevo by Serbian nationalist Gavrilo Princip. The Austrian response would initiate the July Crisis.
- July 28, 1914: Austria-Hungary declared war on the Kingdom of Serbia, initiating World War I.
- July 30, 1914: The Russian Empire announced a general mobilization in support of Serbia. This quickly resulted in the general mobilization of Austria-Hungary and their ally the German Empire.
- August 1, 1914: Germany declared war on Russia.
- August 3, 1914: Germany declared war on France.
- August 4, 1914:
  - The German Army began the invasion of Belgium.
  - The United Kingdom declared war on Germany.
- August 20, 1914: Pope Pius X died at the Apostolic Palace after a brief illness.
- September 3, 1914: Giacomo della Chiesa was elected the 258th pope, taking the name Benedict XV.
- September 5–12, 1914: The First Battle of the Marne occurred near Brasles in northern France. A victory for England and France, it halted the German offensive toward Paris. Nearly 2,000,000 men participated in the battle, resulting in almost 500,000 casualties.
- September 26, 1914: President Woodrow Wilson signed the Federal Trade Commission Act of 1914.
- October 29, 1914: The Ottoman Empire launched a surprise attack against Russian ports on the Black Sea, resulting in a declaration of war by Russia and its allies France and England.
- November 3, 1914: 1914 U.S. general election:
  - Emanuel L. Philipp elected Governor of Wisconsin.
  - Paul O. Husting was elected U.S. senator from Wisconsin—the first by popular election.
  - Wisconsin voters rejected ten different amendments to the state constitution:
    - to allow petition-initiated referendums to bypass the legislature
    - to increase legislative salary
    - to allow the legislature to decrease the number of judicial circuits
    - to establish state annuity insurance
    - home rule for cities and villages
    - municipal power of condemnation
    - to create a fast track for future constitutional amendments—a 3/5 vote of the legislature in favor of a constitutional amendment would remove the need for a second vote by the subsequent legislature.
    - to allow petition-initiated amendments to the state constitution
    - to allow recall of state officers
- December 17, 1914: President Woodrow Wilson signed the Harrison Narcotics Tax Act.

== Major legislation ==
- February 18, 1913: Joint Resolution ratifying an amendment to the constitution of the United States relating to popular election of United States Senators, 1913 Joint Resolution 5. This was Wisconsin's ratification of the seventeenth amendment to the United States Constitution.
- May 7, 1913: An Act to authorize the industrial commission to investigate the subject of old-age pensions, 1913 Act 185. Initial steps toward establishing a state pension system.
- May 14, 1913: An Act ... relating to the law of the road for automobiles, and providing a penalty, 1913 Act 249. Established in law that automobiles and other vehicles should move to their right when encountering oncoming traffic.
- May 27, 1913: An Act ... relating to pecuniary assistance to prisoners and their families, 1913 Act 353. Enabled prisoners to receive payment for participating in state work release programs.
- May 28, 1913: An Act ... relating to infectious diseases, 1913 Act 308. Established that persons suffering from tuberculosis but not abiding by public health directives could be involuntarily committed to a hospital to prevent spread of the disease.
- May 29, 1913: An Act ... to appropriate a certain sum of money to the normal school fund to build a normal school at Eau Claire, 1913 Act 359. Establishing the school that would become University of Wisconsin–Eau Claire.
- June 14, 1913: An Act ... relating to the employments of minors and females, 1913 Act 466. Specified a wide range of dangerous job duties for which it would be illegal to employ minors.

== Party summary ==
=== Senate summary ===
Senate partisan composition Democratic: 7 seats Social Dem.: 1 seat Republican: 24 seats Vacant: 1 seat

| | Party (Shading indicates majority caucus) | | | Total | |
| | Dem. | S.D. | Rep. | Total | Vacant |
|---|---|---|---|---|---|
| End of previous Legislature | 4 | 2 | 26 | 32 | 1 |
| Start of 1st Session | 7 | 1 | 25 | 33 | 0 |
| From Mar. 4, 1913 (Note: Republican Edward E. Browne (21st District) resigned March 4, 1913, due to his election to the United States House of Representatives.) | 7 | 1 | 24 | 32 | 1 |
| Final voting share | 25% | | 75% | | |
| Beginning of the next Legislature | 9 | 1 | 23 | 33 | 0 |

=== Assembly summary ===
Assembly partisan composition Democratic: 35 seats Social Dem.: 6 seats Independent: 1 seat Republican: 58 seats

| | Party (Shading indicates majority caucus) | | | | Total | |
| | Dem. | S.D. | Ind. | Rep. | Total | Vacant |
|---|---|---|---|---|---|---|
| End of previous Legislature | 29 | 12 | 0 | 59 | 100 | 0 |
| Start of 1st Session | 35 | 6 | 0 | 59 | 100 | 0 |
| From Jan. 19, 1913 (Note: Republican Albert E. Schwittay (Marinette District) died January 19, 1913.) | 35 | 6 | 0 | 58 | 99 | 1 |
| From Feb. 25, 1913 (Note: Independent James Larson (Marinette District) replaced Albert Schittay.) | 35 | 6 | 1 | 58 | 100 | 0 |
| Final voting share | 42% | | | 58% | | |
| Beginning of the next Legislature | 29 | 8 | 0 | 63 | 100 | 0 |

== Sessions ==
- 1st Regular session: January 8, 1913 – August 9, 1913

== Leaders ==
=== Senate leadership ===
- President of the Senate: Thomas Morris (R)
- President pro tempore: Harry C. Martin (R–Darlington)

=== Assembly leadership ===
- Speaker of the Assembly: Merlin Hull (R–Black River Falls)

== Members ==
=== Members of the Senate ===
Members of the Senate for the Fifty-First Wisconsin Legislature:

Senate partisan representation Democratic: 7 seats Social Dem.: 1 seat Republican: 25 seats

| Dist. | Counties | Senator | Residence | Party |
|---|---|---|---|---|
| 01 | Door, Kewaunee, & Marinette | M. W. Perry | Algoma | Rep. |
| 02 | Brown & Oconto | Timothy Burke | Green Bay | Rep. |
| 03 | Kenosha & Racine | Isaac T. Bishop | Somers | Rep. |
| 04 | Milwaukee (Northern Part) | William L. Richards | Milwaukee | Rep. |
| 05 | Milwaukee (Middle-West County & Central-Western City) | George J. Weigle | Milwaukee | Rep. |
| 06 | Milwaukee (Northern City) | George Weissleder | Milwaukee | Dem. |
| 07 | Milwaukee (Southern County) | Gabriel Zophy | Milwaukee | Soc.D. |
| 08 | Milwaukee (City South) | Alexander E. Martin | Milwaukee | Rep. |
| 09 | Milwaukee (City Downtown) | Edward F. Kileen | Wautoma | Rep. |
| 10 | Buffalo, Pepin, Pierce, & St. Croix | George B. Skogmo | River Falls | Rep. |
| 11 | Burnett, Douglas, & Washburn | Victor Linley | Superior | Rep. |
| 12 | Ashland, Bayfield, Price, Rusk, & Sawyer | A. Pearce Tomkins | Ashland | Rep. |
| 13 | Dodge & Washington | Paul O. Husting | Mayville | Dem. |
| 14 | Outagamie & Shawano | Henry N. Culbertson | | Rep. |
| 15 | Calumet & Manitowoc | Samuel W. Randolph | Manitowoc | Dem. |
| 16 | Crawford, Grant, & Richland | Robert Glenn | Wyalusing | Rep. |
| 17 | Green, Iowa, & Lafayette | Harry C. Martin | Darlington | Rep. |
| 18 | Fond du Lac & Green Lake | Lewis G. Kellogg | Ripon | Dem. |
| 19 | Winnebago | Merritt F. White | Winneconne | Rep. |
| 20 | Ozaukee & Sheboygan | William J. Bichler | Belgium | Dem. |
| 21 | Adams, Juneau, Marquette, & Waushara | Edward E. Browne (res. March 4, 1913) | Waupaca | Rep. |
| 21 | Adams, Juneau, Marquette, & Waushara | --Vacant from Mar. 4, 1913-- | | |
| 22 | Rock & Walworth | Lawrence E. Cunningham | Beloit | Rep. |
| 23 | Portage & Waupaca | Charles A. Snover | Fort Atkinson | Dem. |
| 24 | Clark & Wood | Robert W. Monk | Neillsville | Rep. |
| 25 | Langlade & Marathon | W. W. Albers | Wausau | Dem. |
| 26 | Dane | Henry Huber | Stoughton | Rep. |
| 27 | Columbia & Sauk | John M. True | Baraboo | Rep. |
| 28 | Chippewa, & Eau Claire | Edward Ackley | Chippewa Falls | Rep. |
| 29 | Barron, Dunn, & Polk | George E. Scott | Prairie Farm | Rep. |
| 30 | Florence, Forest, Iron, Lincoln, Oneida, Taylor, & Vilas | Willard T. Stevens | | Rep. |
| 31 | Jackson, Monroe, & Vernon | Howard Teasdale | Sparta | Rep. |
| 32 | La Crosse & Trempealeau | Otto Bosshard | La Crosse | Rep. |
| 33 | Jefferson & Waukesha | George E. Hoyt | Menomonee Falls | Rep. |

=== Members of the Assembly ===
Members of the Assembly for the Fifty-First Wisconsin Legislature:

Assembly partisan composition Democratic: 35 seats Social Dem.: 6 seats Independent: 1 seat Republican: 58 seats

Milwaukee County districts

| Senate District | County | Dist. | Representative | Party | Residence |
|---|---|---|---|---|---|
| 21 | Adams & Marquette | | George W. Bingham | Rep. | Friendship |
| 12 | Ashland | | D. E. Bowe | Rep. | Mellen |
| 29 | Barron | | Andrew Gulickson | Rep. | Stanley |
| 12 | Bayfield | | Hubert H. Peavey | Rep. | Washburn |
| 02 | Brown | 1 | Archie McComb | Rep. | Green Bay |
| 02 | Brown | 2 | John L. Schnitzler | Rep. | De Pere |
| 10 | Buffalo & Pepin | | James Allison | Rep. | Maxville |
| 11 | Burnett & Washburn | | Hans M. Laursen | Rep. | Shell Lake |
| 15 | Calumet | | August T. Dorn | Dem. | Harrison |
| 28 | Chippewa | | Thomas W. Bartingale | Rep. | |
| 24 | Clark | | Arnt O. Rhea | Rep. | Thorp |
| 27 | Columbia | | K. A. Johnson | Rep. | Portage |
| 16 | Crawford | | T. Frank Clancy | Rep. | Soldiers Grove |
| 26 | Dane | 1 | Fred L. Holmes | Rep. | Madison |
| 26 | Dane | 2 | Edward C. Meland | Rep. | DeForest |
| 26 | Dane | 3 | Thomas A. Stewart | Dem. | Verona |
| 13 | Dodge | 1 | Charles Lentz | Dem. | Herman |
| 13 | Dodge | 2 | Henry E. Krueger | Dem. | Beaver Dam |
| 01 | Door | | Lewis L. Johnson | Rep. | Clay Banks |
| 11 | Douglas | 1 | Philip Gannon | Rep. | Superior |
| 11 | Douglas | 2 | Ray J. Nye | Rep. | Superior |
| 29 | Dunn | | James D. Millar | Rep. | Menomonie |
| 28 | Eau Claire | | Henry Laycock | Rep. | Eau Claire |
| 30 | Florence, Forest, & Oneida | | Douglas Anderson | Rep. | Rhinelander |
| 18 | Fond du Lac | 1 | Christian Pickart | Dem. | Marshfield |
| 18 | Fond du Lac | 2 | William F. Sommerfield | Rep. | Oakfield |
| 16 | Grant | 1 | James Dolan | Dem. | Platteville |
| 16 | Grant | 2 | Henry E. Roethe | Rep. | Fennimore |
| 17 | Green | | S. A. Schindler | Rep. | New Glarus |
| 18 | Green Lake | | Newcomb Spoor | Rep. | Berlin |
| 17 | Iowa | | Albert D. Richardson | Rep. | Wyoming |
| 30 | Iron & Vilas | | William Whiteside | Rep. | |
| 31 | Jackson | | Merlin Hull | Rep. | Black River Falls |
| 33 | Jefferson | 1 | C. F. Viebahn | Dem. | Watertown |
| 33 | Jefferson | 2 | Oscar F. Roessler | Dem. | Jefferson |
| 21 | Juneau | | A. A. Telfer | Rep. | Elroy |
| 03 | Kenosha | | Charles H. Pfennig | Rep. | Kenosha |
| 01 | Kewaunee | | Paul Hoverson | Rep. | Franklin |
| 32 | La Crosse | 1 | Clark L. Hood | Dem. | La Crosse |
| 32 | La Crosse | 2 | E. J. Kneen | Dem. | Bangor |
| 17 | Lafayette | | Julius M. Engebretson | Rep. | Wiota |
| 25 | Langlade | | Edward Nordman | Dem. | Polar |
| 30 | Lincoln | | John O'Day | Dem. | Merrill |
| 15 | Manitowoc | 1 | Carl Hansen | Dem. | Manitowoc |
| 15 | Manitowoc | 2 | Peter J. Murphy | Dem. | Cato |
| 25 | Marathon | 1 | Francis X. Schilling | Rep. | Cassel |
| 25 | Marathon | 2 | Oscar Ringle | Dem. | Wausau |
| 01 | Marinette | | Albert E. Schwittay (died Jan. 19, 1913) | Rep. | Marinette |
| 01 | Marinette | | James Larson (from Feb. 25, 1913) | Ind. | Marinette |
| 09 | Milwaukee | 1 | Edwin Hinkel | Dem. | Milwaukee |
| 09 | Milwaukee | 2 | Thomas A. Manning | Dem. | Milwaukee |
| 09 | Milwaukee | 3 | David V. Jennings | Dem. | Milwaukee |
| 05 | Milwaukee | 4 | Carl Minkley | Soc.D. | Milwaukee |
| 08 | Milwaukee | 5 | Charles J. Stemper | Dem. | Milwaukee |
| 05 | Milwaukee | 6 | A. J. Hedding | Dem. | Milwaukee |
| 05 | Milwaukee | 7 | Edward Zinn | Soc.D. | Milwaukee |
| 08 | Milwaukee | 8 | Jacob J. Litza Jr. | Dem. | Milwaukee |
| 06 | Milwaukee | 9 | W. E. Walsh | Dem. | Milwaukee |
| 04 | Milwaukee | 10 | Edward H. Kiefer | Soc.D. | Milwaukee |
| 08 | Milwaukee | 11 | James Vint | Soc.D. | Milwaukee |
| 08 | Milwaukee | 12 | William L. Smith | Soc.D. | Milwaukee |
| 04 | Milwaukee | 13 | Charles E. Estabrook | Rep. | Milwaukee |
| 07 | Milwaukee | 14 | Martin Gorecki | Soc.D. | Milwaukee |
| 05 | Milwaukee | 15 | August Dietrich | Rep. | Milwaukee |
| 05 | Milwaukee | 16 | Edward J. Burke | Dem. | Milwaukee |
| 07 | Milwaukee | 17 | John Paulu | Dem. | Milwaukee |
| 04 | Milwaukee | 18 | Joseph F. Smart | Dem. | Milwaukee |
| 07 | Milwaukee | 19 | Luke Scanlan | Dem. | Oak Creek |
| 31 | Monroe | | A. E. Frederick | Rep. | Kendall |
| 02 | Oconto | | Robert G. Sharp | Rep. | Oconto |
| 14 | Outagamie | 1 | Isaac N. Stewart | Dem. | |
| 14 | Outagamie | 2 | Charles H. Mory | Rep. | Cicero |
| 20 | Ozaukee | | Jacob Dietrich | Dem. | Cedarburg |
| 10 | Pierce | | Cassius D. Hawn | Rep. | Rock Elm |
| 29 | Polk | | Axel Johnson | Rep. | Apple River |
| 23 | Portage | | Don C. Hall | Rep. | Stevens Point |
| 12 | Price | | August Heden | Rep. | Ogema |
| 03 | Racine | 1 | Charles H. Everett | Rep. | Racine |
| 03 | Racine | 2 | Joseph C. Hamata | Dem. | Racine |
| 28 | Richland | | J. B. Jenson | Rep. | Westford |
| 22 | Rock | 1 | Alexander Paul | Dem. | Milton |
| 22 | Rock | 2 | Charles D. Rosa | Rep. | Beloit |
| 12 | Rusk & Sawyer | | Dell H. Richards | Rep. | Ladysmith |
| 27 | Sauk | | George Carpenter | Rep. | Baraboo |
| 14 | Shawano | | Thomas J. Mahon | Rep. | Birnamwood |
| 20 | Sheboygan | 1 | Carl Zillier | Dem. | Sheboygan |
| 20 | Sheboygan | 2 | Henry Ott | Rep. | Plymouth |
| 10 | St. Croix | | John A. Chinnock | Rep. | Hudson |
| 30 | Taylor | | Elias L. Urquhart | Rep. | Medford |
| 32 | Trempealeau | | L. L. Grinde | Rep. | Gale |
| 31 | Vernon | | Lawrence Grimsrud | Rep. | Westby |
| 23 | Walworth | | S. Clayton Goff | Rep. | Elkhorn |
| 13 | Washington | | Joseph Giudice | Dem. | Slinger |
| 33 | Waukesha | 1 | Percy Sawyer | Rep. | Waukesha |
| 33 | Waukesha | 2 | Judson Hall | Dem. | Merton |
| 23 | Waupaca | | Andrew R. Potts | Rep. | Dayton |
| 21 | Waushara | | Michael O'Connor | Rep. | Hancock |
| 19 | Winnebago | 1 | Martin T. Battis | Rep. | Oshkosh |
| 19 | Winnebago | 2 | Charles Schultz | Dem. | Neenah |
| 19 | Winnebago | 3 | Wilbur E. Hurlbut | Rep. | Oshkosh |
| 24 | Wood | | D. D. Conway | Dem. | Grand Rapids |

== Changes from the 50th Legislature ==
New districts for the 51st Legislature were defined in 1911 Wisconsin Act 661, passed into law in the 50th Wisconsin Legislature.

=== Senate redistricting ===
==== Summary of changes ====
- 11 districts were left unchanged
- Dodge County went from having its own district to sharing with Washington County (13).
- Milwaukee County went from having 5 districts to 6 (4, 5, 6, 7, 8, 9).
- Rock County went from having its own district to sharing again with Walworth County (22).
- Only two single-county districts remain (19, 26).

==== Senate districts ====
| Dist. | 50th Legislature | 51st Legislature |
|---|---|---|
| 1 | Door, Kewaunee, Marinette counties | Door, Kewaunee, Marinette counties |
| 2 | Brown, Oconto counties | Brown, Oconto counties |
| 3 | Kenosha, Racine counties | Kenosha, Racine counties |
| 4 | Milwaukee County (northern quarter) | Milwaukee County (northern quarter) |
| 5 | Milwaukee County (city center) | Milwaukee County (central-west) |
| 6 | Milwaukee County (city northwest) | Milwaukee County (city north) |
| 7 | Milwaukee County (southern & west) | Milwaukee County (southern) |
| 8 | Milwaukee County (city south) | Milwaukee County (city south) |
| 9 | Adams, Marquette, Waushara, Wood counties | Milwaukee County (city center) |
| 10 | Pierce, St. Croix counties | Buffalo, Pepin, Pierce, St. Croix counties |
| 11 | Burnett, Douglas, Polk counties | Burnett, Douglas, Washburn counties |
| 12 | Ashland, Bayfield, Price, Sawyer, Taylor, Washburn counties | Ashland, Bayfield, Price, Rusk, Sawyer counties |
| 13 | Dodge County | Dodge, Washington counties |
| 14 | Outagamie, Shawano counties | Outagamie, Shawano counties |
| 15 | Calumet, Manitowoc counties | Calumet, Manitowoc counties |
| 16 | Crawford, Grant counties | Crawford, Grant, Richland counties |
| 17 | Green, Iowa, Lafayette counties | Green, Iowa, Lafayette counties |
| 18 | Fond du Lac, Green Lake | Fond du Lac, Green Lake |
| 19 | Winnebago County | Winnebago County |
| 20 | Ozaukee, Sheboygan county | Ozaukee, Sheboygan county |
| 21 | Portage, Waupaca counties | Adams, Juneau, Marquette, Waushara counties |
| 22 | Rock County | Rock, Walworth counties |
| 23 | Jefferson, Walworth counties | Portage, Waupaca counties |
| 24 | Chippewa, Eau Claire, Rusk counties | Clark, Wood counties |
| 25 | Clark, Marathon counties | Langlade, Marathon counties |
| 26 | Dane County | Dane County |
| 27 | Columbia, Sauk counties | Columbia, Sauk counties |
| 28 | Richland, Vernon counties | Chippewa, Eau Claire counties |
| 29 | Barron, Buffalo, Dunn, Pepin counties | Barron, Dunn, Polk counties |
| 30 | Florence, Forest, Iron, Langlade, Lincoln, Oneida, Vilas counties | Florence, Forest, Iron, Lincoln, Oneida, Taylor, Vilas counties |
| 31 | Jackson, Juneau, Monroe counties | Jackson, Monroe, Vernon counties |
| 32 | La Crosse, Trempealeau counties | La Crosse, Trempealeau counties |
| 33 | Washington, Waukesha counties | Jefferson, Waukesha counties |

=== Assembly redistricting ===
==== Summary of changes ====
- Bayfield County became its own district after previously having been in a shared district with Sawyer and Washburn counties.
- Eau Claire County went from having 2 districts to 1.
- Langlade County became its own district after previously having been in a shared district with Florence and Forest counties.
- Marinette County went from having 2 districts to 1.
- Milwaukee County went from having 16 districts to 19.
- Polk County became its own district after previously having been in a shared district with Burnett County.
- Price and Taylor counties both became independent districts after previously having been in a shared district.
- Rock County went from having 3 districts to 2.
- Sauk County went from having 2 districts to 1.
- Waupaca County went from having 2 districts to 1.

==== Assembly districts ====
| County | Districts in 50th Legislature | Districts in 51st Legislature | Change |
|---|---|---|---|
| Adams | Shared with Marquette | Shared with Marquette | Steady |
| Ashland | 1 District | 1 District | Steady |
| Barron | 1 District | 1 District | Steady |
| Bayfield | Shared with Sawyer, & Washburn | 1 District | ▼ |
| Brown | 2 Districts | 2 Districts | Steady |
| Buffalo | Shared with Pepin | Shared with Pepin | Steady |
| Burnett | Shared with Polk | Shared with Washburn | Steady |
| Calumet | 1 District | 1 District | Steady |
| Chippewa | 2 Districts | 1 District | ▼ |
| Clark | 1 District | 1 District | Steady |
| Columbia | 2 Districts | 1 District | ▼ |
| Crawford | 1 District | 1 District | Steady |
| Dane | 3 Districts | 3 Districts | Steady |
| Dodge | 2 Districts | 2 Districts | Steady |
| Door | 1 District | 1 District | Steady |
| Douglas | 2 Districts | 2 Districts | Steady |
| Dunn | 1 District | 1 District | Steady |
| Eau Claire | 2 Districts | 1 District | ▼ |
| Florence | Shared with Forest & Langlade | Shared with Forest & Oneida | Steady |
| Fond du Lac | 2 Districts | 2 Districts | Steady |
| Forest | Shared with Florence & Langlade | Shared with Florence & Oneida | Steady |
| Grant | 2 Districts | 2 Districts | Steady |
| Green | 1 District | 1 District | Steady |
| Green Lake | 1 District | 1 District | Steady |
| Iowa | 1 District | 1 District | Steady |
| Iron | Shared with Oneida, Vilas | Shared with Vilas | Steady |
| Jackson | 1 District | 1 District | Steady |
| Jefferson | 2 Districts | 2 Districts | Steady |
| Juneau | 1 District | 1 District | Steady |
| Kenosha | 1 District | 1 District | Steady |
| Kewaunee | 1 District | 1 District | Steady |
| La Crosse | 2 Districts | 2 Districts | Steady |
| Lafayette | 1 District | 1 District | Steady |
| Langlade | Shared with Florence & Forest | 1 District | ▲ |
| Lincoln | 1 District | 1 District | Steady |
| Manitowoc | 2 Districts | 2 Districts | Steady |
| Marathon | 2 Districts | 2 Districts | Steady |
| Marinette | 2 Districts | 1 District | ▼ |
| Marquette | Shared with Adams | Shared with Adams | Steady |
| Milwaukee | 16 Districts | 19 Districts | ▲▲ |
| Monroe | 1 District | 1 District | Steady |
| Oconto | 1 District | 1 District | Steady |
| Oneida | Shared with Iron, Vilas | Shared with Florence, Forest | Steady |
| Outagamie | 2 Districts | 2 Districts | Steady |
| Ozaukee | 1 District | 1 District | Steady |
| Pepin | Shared with Buffalo | Shared with Buffalo | Steady |
| Pierce | 1 District | 1 District | Steady |
| Polk | Shared with Burnett | 1 District | ▲ |
| Portage | 1 District | 1 District | Steady |
| Price | Shared with Taylor | 1 District | ▲ |
| Racine | 2 Districts | 2 Districts | Steady |
| Richland | 1 District | 1 District | Steady |
| Rock | 3 Districts | 2 Districts | ▼ |
| Rusk | Shared with Chippewa | Shared with Sawyer | Steady |
| Sauk | 2 Districts | 1 District | ▼ |
| Sawyer | Shared with Bayfield & Washburn | Shared with Rusk | Steady |
| Shawano | 1 District | 1 District | Steady |
| Sheboygan | 2 Districts | 2 Districts | Steady |
| St. Croix | 1 District | 1 District | Steady |
| Taylor | Shared with Price | 1 District | ▲ |
| Trempealeau | 1 District | 1 District | Steady |
| Vernon | 1 District | 1 District | Steady |
| Vilas | Shared with Iron, Oneida | Shared with Iron | Steady |
| Walworth | 1 District | 1 District | Steady |
| Washburn | Shared with Bayfield & Sawyer | Shared with Burnett | Steady |
| Washington | 1 District | 1 District | Steady |
| Waukesha | 2 Districts | 2 Districts | Steady |
| Waupaca | 2 Districts | 1 District | ▼ |
| Waushara | 1 District | 1 District | Steady |
| Winnebago | 3 Districts | 3 Districts | Steady |
| Wood | 1 District | 1 District | Steady |
