= 52nd Wisconsin Legislature =

Wisconsin legislative term for 1915–1916

←	51st	53rd	→
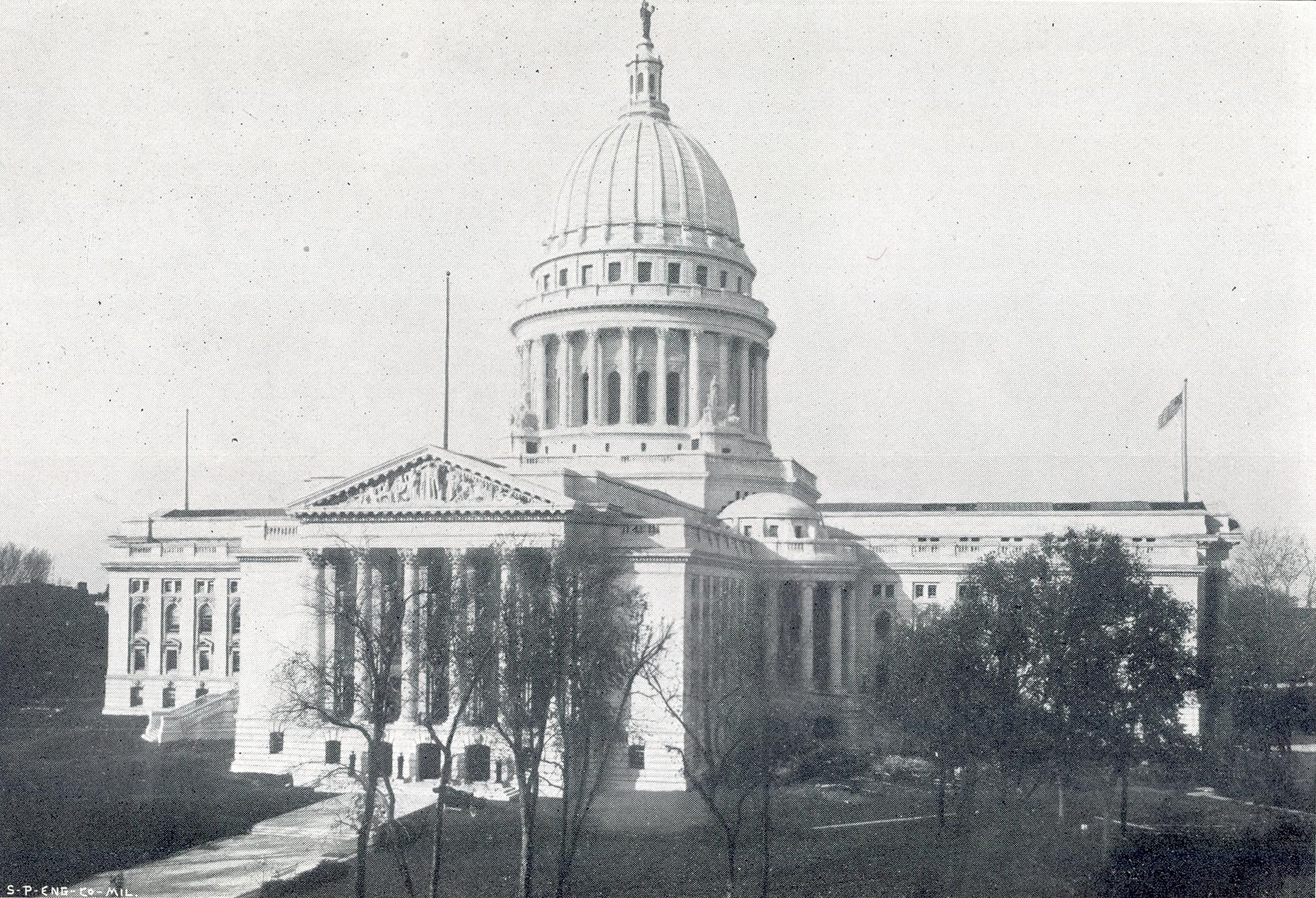
- Wisconsin State Capitol ca.1915

Overview
- Legislative body: Wisconsin Legislature
- Meeting place: Wisconsin State Capitol
- Term: January 4, 1915 – January 1, 1917
- Election: November 3, 1914

Senate
- Members: 33
- Senate President: Edward Dithmar (R)
- President pro tempore: Edward T. Fairchild (R)^{until September 25, 1916}
- Party control: Republican

Assembly
- Members: 100
- Assembly Speaker: Lawrence C. Whittet (R)
- Party control: Republican

Sessions
- Regular: January 13, 1915 – August 24, 1915

Special sessions
- Oct. 1916 Spec.: October 10, 1916 – October 11, 1916

The Fifty-Second Wisconsin Legislature convened from January 13, 1915, to August 24, 1915, in regular session, and re-convened in a special session on October 10 and October 11, 1916.

Senators representing odd-numbered districts were newly elected for this session and were serving the first two years of a four-year term. Assembly members were elected to a two-year term. Assembly members and odd-numbered senators were elected in the general election of November 3, 1914. Senators representing even-numbered districts were serving the third and fourth year of a four-year term, having been elected in the general election of November 5, 1912.

The governor of Wisconsin during this entire term was Republican Emanuel L. Philipp, of Milwaukee County, serving a two-year term, having won election in the 1914 Wisconsin gubernatorial election.

== Major events ==
- May 7, 1915: The ocean liner RMS Lusitania was torpedoed by a German U-boat and sunk off the coast of Ireland.
- January 24, 1916: The U.S. Supreme Court decided the case Brushaber v. Union Pacific Railroad Co., affirming the constitutionality of the federal income tax.
- March 8, 1916: Mexican revolutionary Pancho Villa led a force across the border into the U.S. state of New Mexico, killing twelve U.S. soldiers.
- March 15, 1916: In response to the New Mexico raid, U.S. President Woodrow Wilson ordered 12,000 U.S. military personnel to cross into Mexico to hunt down Pancho Villa.
- April 4, 1916: Judge Franz C. Eschweiler was elected justice of the Wisconsin Supreme Court to succeeded William H. Timlin.
- May 4, 1916: The German Empire issued the Sussex pledge in an attempt to appease the United States over the issue of unrestricted submarine warfare.
- May 16, 1916: Following a coup in the Dominican Republic, United States marines landed in the country and began an eight-year occupation.
- May 22, 1916: The U.S. Supreme Court decided the case Wisconsin v. Phila. & Reading Coal Co., finding that Wisconsin's corporate regulations placed an unconstitutional burden on corporations operating in Wisconsin but incorporated in other states.
- June 13, 1916: U.S. President Woodrow Wilson signed the National Defense Act of 1916, expanding the National Guard and creating an Officers Reserve Corps, Enlisted Reserve Corps, and the Reserve Officers' Training Corps, and expanding the powers of the President to federalize the National Guard.
- July 30, 1916: German saboteurs caused the Black Tom explosion in Jersey City, New Jersey, destroying an American ammunition depot and killing seven people.
- August 21, 1916: Wisconsin Supreme Court justice William H. Timlin died in office.
- August 30, 1916: Governor Emanuel L. Philipp appointed Franz C. Eschweiler to begin his term early on the Wisconsin Supreme Court, following the death of justice William H. Timlin.
- November 7, 1916: 1916 United States general election:
  - Woodrow Wilson re-elected President of the United States.
  - Emanuel L. Philipp re-elected Governor of Wisconsin.
  - Robert M. La Follette re-elected United States senator from Wisconsin.

== Major legislation ==
- July 15, 1915: An Act ... abolishing the offices of state fish and game warden, state board of forestry, state conservation commission, commissioners of fisheries and the state park board, and providing for the appointment of a state conservation commission of Wisconsin, and making an appropriation, 1915 Act 406. Created the Wisconsin Conservation Commission.
- July 19, 1915: An Act ... abolishing the state board of agriculture, the state board of immigration, the board of veterinary examiners, the state live stock sanitary board, the state inspector of apiaries, the state orchard and nursery inspector and the office of state veterinarian as now established ... creating a department of agriculture, a state live stock sanitary board, the office of state entomologist, a state fair advisory board, and prescribing their powers and duties, and making an appropriation, 1915 Act 413. Created the Wisconsin Department of Agriculture and transformed several other farm examination entities.

== Party summary ==
=== Senate summary ===
Senate partisan composition Democratic: 9 seats Social Dem.: 1 seat Republican: 23 seats

	Party (Shading indicates majority caucus)			Total	
	Dem.	S.D.	Rep.	Total	Vacant
End of previous Legislature	7	1	24	32	1
Start of 1st Session	9	1	23	33	0
From Aug. 26, 1915 (Note: Republican Robert Glenn (16th District) died August 26, 1915.)	9	1	22	32	1
From Nov. 9, 1915 (Note: Republican George E. Scott (29th District) died November 9, 1915.)	9	1	21	31	2
From Sep. 25, 1916 (Note: Republican Edward T. Fairchild (5th District) resigned September 25, 1916, due to his appointment as a Wisconsin circuit court judge.)	9	1	20	30	3
Final voting share	33.33%		66.67%		
Beginning of the next Legislature	6	3	24	33	0

=== Assembly summary ===
Assembly partisan composition Democratic: 29 seats Social Dem.: 8 seats Republican: 63 seats

	Party (Shading indicates majority caucus)				Total	
	Dem.	S.D.	Ind.	Rep.	Total	Vacant
End of previous Legislature	35	6	1	58	100	0
Start of 1st Session	29	8	0	63	100	0
Final voting share	37%			63%		
Beginning of the next Legislature	14	7	0	79	100	0

== Sessions ==
- 1st Regular session: January 13, 1915 – August 24, 1915
- October 1916 special session: October 10, 1916 – October 11, 1916

== Leaders ==
=== Senate leadership ===
- President of the Senate: Edward Dithmar (R)
- President pro tempore: Edward T. Fairchild (R–Milwaukee) (until Sep. 25, 1916)

=== Assembly leadership ===
- Speaker of the Assembly: Lawrence C. Whittet (R–Edgerton)

== Members ==
=== Members of the Senate ===
Members of the Senate for the Fifty-Second Wisconsin Legislature:

Senate partisan representation Democratic: 9 seats Social Dem.: 1 seat Republican: 23 seats

Dist.	Counties	Senator	Residence	Party
01	Door, Kewaunee, & Marinette	M. W. Perry	Algoma	Rep.
02	Brown & Oconto	Timothy Burke	Green Bay	Rep.
03	Kenosha & Racine	Charles H. Everett	Racine	Rep.
04	Milwaukee (Northern Part)	William L. Richards	Milwaukee	Rep.
05	Milwaukee (Middle-West County & Central-Western City)	Edward T. Fairchild (resigned Sep. 25, 1916)	Milwaukee	Rep.
05	Milwaukee (Middle-West County & Central-Western City)	--Vacant from Sep. 25, 1916--		
06	Milwaukee (Northern City)	George Weissleder	Milwaukee	Dem.
07	Milwaukee (Southern County)	Louis A. Arnold	Milwaukee	Soc.D.
08	Milwaukee (City South)	Alexander E. Martin	Milwaukee	Rep.
09	Milwaukee (City Downtown)	David V. Jennings	Milwaukee	Dem.
10	Buffalo, Pepin, Pierce, & St. Croix	George B. Skogmo	River Falls	Rep.
11	Burnett, Douglas, & Washburn	Fred A. Baxter	Superior	Rep.
12	Ashland, Bayfield, Price, Rusk, & Sawyer	A. Pearce Tomkins	Ashland	Rep.
13	Dodge & Washington	Byron Barwig	Mayville	Dem.
14	Outagamie & Shawano	Henry N. Culbertson	Dale	Rep.
15	Calumet & Manitowoc	Henry Rollmann	Chilton	Dem.
16	Crawford, Grant, & Richland	Robert Glenn (died Aug. 26, 1915)	Wyalusing	Rep.
16	Crawford, Grant, & Richland	--Vacant from Aug. 26, 1915--		
17	Green, Iowa, & Lafayette	Platt Whitman	Highland	Rep.
18	Fond du Lac & Green Lake	Lewis G. Kellogg	Ripon	Dem.
19	Winnebago	William M. Bray	Oshkosh	Rep.
20	Ozaukee & Sheboygan	William J. Bichler	Belgium	Dem.
21	Adams, Juneau, Marquette, & Waushara	Frank H. Hanson	Mauston	Rep.
22	Rock & Walworth	Lawrence E. Cunningham	Beloit	Rep.
23	Portage & Waupaca	Andrew R. Potts	Dayton	Rep.
24	Clark & Wood	Robert W. Monk	Neillsville	Rep.
25	Langlade & Marathon	W. W. Albers	Wausau	Dem.
26	Dane	Henry Huber	Stoughton	Rep.
27	Columbia & Sauk	George Staudenmayer	Caledonia	Dem.
28	Chippewa, & Eau Claire	Edward Ackley	Chippewa Falls	Rep.
29	Barron, Dunn, & Polk	George E. Scott (died Nov. 9, 1915)	Prairie Farm	Rep.
29	Barron, Dunn, & Polk	—Vacant from Nov. 9, 1915--		
30	Florence, Forest, Iron, Lincoln, Oneida, Taylor, & Vilas	Willard T. Stevens	Rhinelander	Rep.
31	Jackson, Monroe, & Vernon	J. Henry Bennett	Viroqua	Rep.
32	La Crosse & Trempealeau	Otto Bosshard	La Crosse	Rep.
33	Jefferson & Waukesha	Charles Mulberger	Watertown	Dem.

=== Members of the Assembly ===
Members of the Assembly for the Fifty-Second Wisconsin Legislature:

Assembly partisan composition Democratic: 29 seats Social Dem.: 8 seats Republican: 63 seats

Milwaukee County districts

Senate Dist.	County	Dist.	Representative	Party	Residence
21	Adams & Marquette		Frank L. McGowan	Rep.	Endeavor
12	Ashland		Charles Kleinsteiber	Rep.	Butternut
29	Barron		James R. Beckwith	Rep.	Barron
12	Bayfield		Walter A. Duffy	Rep.	
02	Brown	1	Nicholas Feldhausen	Dem.	Green Bay
02	Brown	2	Henry J. Janssen	Dem.	De Pere
10	Buffalo & Pepin		John J. Morgan	Rep.	Durand
11	Burnett & Washburn		Hans M. Laursen	Rep.	Shell Lake
15	Calumet		Henry W. Hoffman	Dem.	Stockbridge
28	Chippewa		Western Woodard	Rep.	Bloomer
24	Clark		Emery Crosby	Rep.	Neillsville
27	Columbia		Robert Caldwell	Rep.	Arlington
16	Crawford		Cyrus L. Lathrop	Dem.	Wauzeka
26	Dane	1	John B. Heim	Dem.	Madison
26	Dane	2	William Nelson	Rep.	Deerfield
26	Dane	3	Thomas A. Stewart	Dem.	Verona
13	Dodge	1	Charles Lentz	Dem.	Herman
13	Dodge	2	Joseph Biel	Dem.	Westford
01	Door		Fred S. Hanson	Rep.	Sturgeon Bay
11	Douglas	1	David L. Dobie	Rep.	
11	Douglas	2	Ray J. Nye	Rep.	Superior
29	Dunn		Carl Pieper	Rep.	Menomonie
28	Eau Claire		John E. Ofstie	Rep.	Eau Claire
30	Florence, Forest, & Oneida		Bernard N. Moran	Rep.	Rhinelander
18	Fond du Lac	1	Christian Pickart	Dem.	Marshfield
18	Fond du Lac	2	Charles Van de Zande	Rep.	Campbellsport
16	Grant	1	Allen Wells	Rep.	Livingston
16	Grant	2	Edward Heathcote	Rep.	Fennimore
17	Green		S. A. Schindler	Rep.	New Glarus
18	Green Lake		Newcomb Spoor	Rep.	Berlin
17	Iowa		Thomas G. Cretney	Rep.	Ridgeway
30	Iron & Vilas		Edward A. Everett	Rep.	Eagle River
31	Jackson		B. L. Van Gorden	Rep.	
33	Jefferson	1	H. J. Grell	Rep.	Johnson Creek
33	Jefferson	2	Nelson H. Falk	Dem.	Lake Mills
21	Juneau		H. J. Mortensen	Rep.	Elroy
03	Kenosha		Edward J. Vincent	Rep.	
01	Kewaunee		William H. O'Brien	Dem.	Franklin
32	La Crosse	1	Carl Kurtenacker	Rep.	La Crosse
32	La Crosse	2	Henry Freehoff	Rep.	Greenfield
17	Lafayette		Julius M. Engebretson	Rep.	Wiota
25	Langlade		Edward Nordman	Dem.	Polar
30	Lincoln		F. W. Kubasta	Rep.	Merrill
15	Manitowoc	1	Carl Hansen	Dem.	Manitowoc
15	Manitowoc	2	Peter J. Murphy	Dem.	Cato
25	Marathon	1	Chris Franzen	Dem.	Day
25	Marathon	2	Edward C. Kretlow	Dem.	Wausau
01	Marinette		Charles A. Budlong	Rep.	
09	Milwaukee	1	Jacob J. Killa	Dem.	Milwaukee
09	Milwaukee	2	Frank E. Waldron	Rep.	Milwaukee
09	Milwaukee	3	John P. Donnelly	Dem.	Milwaukee
05	Milwaukee	4	Carl Minkley	Soc.D.	Milwaukee
08	Milwaukee	5	Charles J. Stemper	Dem.	Milwaukee
05	Milwaukee	6	A. J. Hedding	Dem.	Milwaukee
05	Milwaukee	7	Edward Zinn	Soc.D.	Milwaukee
08	Milwaukee	8	Frank Kubatzki	Dem.	Milwaukee
06	Milwaukee	9	Herman O. Kent	Soc.D.	Milwaukee
04	Milwaukee	10	Frank J. Weber	Soc.D.	Milwaukee
08	Milwaukee	11	James Vint	Soc.D.	Milwaukee
08	Milwaukee	12	William L. Smith	Soc.D.	Milwaukee
04	Milwaukee	13	Christoph Paulus	Rep.	Milwaukee
07	Milwaukee	14	George L. Tews	Soc.D.	Milwaukee
05	Milwaukee	15	George Reinhardt	Rep.	Milwaukee
05	Milwaukee	16	William A. Schroeder	Rep.	Wauwatosa
07	Milwaukee	17	Frank Metcalfe	Soc.D.	Milwaukee
04	Milwaukee	18	Frank L. Prescott	Rep.	Milwaukee
07	Milwaukee	19	Henry S. Berninger	Rep.	West Allis
31	Monroe		A. E. Frederick	Rep.	Kendall
02	Oconto		Arthur J. Whitcomb	Rep.	
14	Outagamie	1	Clinton B. Ballard	Rep.	Grand Chute
14	Outagamie	2	Charles F. Ploeger	Rep.	Seymour
20	Ozaukee		Eugene J. Poole	Dem.	Cedarburg
10	Pierce		William A. Kay	Rep.	
29	Polk		Axel Johnson	Rep.	Apple River
23	Portage		Anton C. Krembs	Dem.	Stevens Point
12	Price		August Heden	Rep.	Ogema
03	Racine	1	John Dixon	Rep.	Racine
03	Racine	2	Henry Herzog	Dem.	Mount Pleasant
28	Richland		J. B. Jenson	Rep.	Westford
22	Rock	1	Lawrence C. Whittet	Rep.	Edgerton
22	Rock	2	Albert J. Winegar	Rep.	Beloit
12	Rusk & Sawyer		Christian Ellingson	Rep.	
27	Sauk		Robert B. Dickie	Rep.	North Freedom
14	Shawano		Julius Hanson	Rep.	Navarino
20	Sheboygan	1	Otto C. Neumeister	Dem.	Sheboygan
20	Sheboygan	2	R. B. Melvin	Rep.	
10	St. Croix		W. C. Bradley	Dem.	
30	Taylor		John Gamper	Dem.	Medford
32	Trempealeau		John F. Hager	Rep.	Whitehall
31	Vernon		Henry Rentz	Rep.	Westby
23	Walworth		George L. Harrington	Rep.	Elkhorn
13	Washington		Jacob J. Aulenbacher	Rep.	Richfield
33	Waukesha	1	J. J. G. Laing	Dem.	Waukesha
33	Waukesha	2	W. H. Edwards	Rep.	Sussex
23	Waupaca		Fred Hess	Rep.	Clintonville
21	Waushara		George M. Byse	Rep.	Wautoma
19	Winnebago	1	Arthur H. Gruenewald	Dem.	Oshkosh
19	Winnebago	2	William Arnemann	Rep.	Neenah
19	Winnebago	3	Charles F. Hart	Rep.	Oshkosh
24	Wood		George Hambrecht	Rep.	Grand Rapids

== Committees ==
=== Senate committees ===
- Senate Standing Committee on Contingent Expenditures – R. W. Monk, chair
- Senate Standing Committee on Corporations – O. Bosshard, chair
- Senate Standing Committee on Education and Public Welfare – M. W. Perry, chair
- Senate Standing Committee on the Judiciary – T. Burke, chair
- Senate Standing Committee on Legislative Procedure – E. Fairchild, chair
- Senate Standing Committee on State Affairs – W. T. Stevens, chair
- Senate Special Committee on Committees – T. Burke, chair
- Senate Special Committee on Conservation – E. Ackley, chair
- Senate Special Committee on Highways – W. J. Bichler, chair

=== Assembly committees ===
- Assembly Standing Committee on Agriculture – H. J. Grell, chair
- Assembly Standing Committee on Commerce and Manufactures – C. K. Ellingson, chair
- Assembly Standing Committee on Contingent Expenditures – F. Hess, chair
- Assembly Standing Committee on Education – S. A. Schindler, chair
- Assembly Standing Committee on Elections – C. Paulus, chair
- Assembly Standing Committee on Engrossed Bills – E. Heathcote, chair
- Assembly Standing Committee on Enrolled Bills – D. L. Dobie, chair
- Assembly Standing Committee on Excise and Fees – J. M. Engebretson, chair
- Assembly Standing Committee on Fish and Game – B. N. Moran, chair
- Assembly Standing Committee on Insurance and Banking – H. M. Laursen, chair
- Assembly Standing Committee on the Judiciary – G. P. Hambrecht, chair
- Assembly Standing Committee on Labor – A. J. Winegar, chair
- Assembly Standing Committee on Municipalities – R. J. Nye, chair
- Assembly Standing Committee on Printing – C. Pieper, chair
- Assembly Standing Committee on Public Welfare – W. A. Kay, chair
- Assembly Standing Committee on Revision – F. S. Hanson, chair
- Assembly Standing Committee on Rules – L. C. Whittet, chair
- Assembly Standing Committee on State Affairs – Ax. Johnson, chair
- Assembly Standing Committee on Taxation – G. Harrington, chair
- Assembly Standing Committee on Third Reading – H. S. Berninger, chair
- Assembly Standing Committee on Transportation – E. A. Everett, chair
- Assembly Special Committee on Rules – L. C. Whittet, chair

=== Joint committees ===
- Joint Standing Committee on Finance – G. E. Scott (Sen.) & F. W. Kubasta (Asm.), co-chairs
- Joint Special Committee on Investigations of State Boards and Commissions – E. Fairchild (Sen.), chair

== Employees ==
=== Senate employees ===
- Chief Clerk: Oliver G. Munson
  - Assistant Chief Clerk: C. E. Mullen
  - Journal Clerk: W. N. Mackin
    - Assistant Journal Clerk: James B. Ackley
  - Bookkeeper: Carle E. Dietze
    - Assistant Bookkeeper: Henry C. Priester
  - Engrossing Clerk: A. J. Nelson
  - Index Clerk: L. H. Cannon
  - Revision Clerk: D. J. Hotchkiss
  - Clerk of the Committee on Corporations: A. C. Miller
  - Clerk of the Committee on Education and Public Welfare: R. H. Hillyer
  - Clerk of the Committee on Finance: Arthur F. Steffen
  - Clerk of the Committee on Highways: L. G. Vogt
  - Clerk of the Committee on the Judiciary: Paul C. Bode
  - Clerk of the Committee on State Affairs: A. A. Heinrich
  - Stenographic Reporter: Roy E. Gordon
  - Stenographers:
    - E. L. Stapleton
    - Albert R. Millett
    - W. J. Van Den Berg
  - Mailing Clerk: E. G. Cooper
- Sergeant-at-Arms: F. E. Andrews
  - Assistant Sergeant-at-Arms: Edward F. McCarthy
  - Document Clerk: Emil Hartman
  - Day Police: Edward J. Samp
  - Night Police: Archibald McQuarrie
  - Gallery Police: Albert Daley
  - Night Laborers:
    - Arlie M. Mucks
    - Stewart S. Williams
- Postmaster: Frank E. Riley
  - Messengers:
    - John Lorigan
    - Robert Kilgust
    - H. B. Haley
    - Harvey C. Hartwig
    - Herbert N. Marsh
    - Orin F. Neibuhr
    - Robert A. Cobban
    - Merlin Conley
    - Paul W. Dietz
    - John E. McNeil

=== Assembly employees ===
- Chief Clerk: C. E. Shaffer
  - Journal Clerk: W. W. Jones
    - Assistant Journal Clerk: Charles E. Tuffley
  - Bookkeeper: W. J. Goldschmidt
    - Assistant Bookkeeper: J. C. Hawker
  - General Clerks:
    - W. F. Bart
    - M. B. Pinkerton
  - Index Clerk: Paul M. Brown
  - Proofreaders and Enrolling Clerks:
    - H. E. Whipple
    - Geo. F. Sharpe
  - Mailing Clerk: Edwin L. Shaffer
  - Stenographers:
    - W. E. Kirk
    - A. H. Gardiner
    - Alvah V. Gruhn
    - C. E. Thayer
    - N. E. Lummerding
    - M. B. Allison
    - Norman L. Anderson
    - G. E. Wuensch
    - L. M. Mielke
    - Frank Robotka
    - Henry G. Lee
    - William Sneeberger
    - Louis G. Meisenheimer
  - Typists:
    - L. L. Oeland
    - Harry J. Campaign
    - Emil Lusthaus
    - P. J. Knippel
- Sergeant-at-Arms: William S. Irvine
  - Assistant Sergeant-at-Arms: Olaf Goldstrand
  - Document Room Custodian: Helmer O. Femrite
    - Assistant Document Room Custodian: John D. Morner
  - Floor Police: Ernest F. Wright
  - Cloak Room Attendant: Peter Duex
  - Gallery Police:
    - Elmer R. Meacham
    - C. H. Sanderson
  - Cloak Room Attendant: Martin Olson
  - Night Laborer: Hilding E. Anderson
  - Night Watch: C. C. Fenn
- Postmaster: Geo. M. Emerich
  - Post Office Messenger: Julius O. Hembre
  - Messengers:
    - Frank P. Vogt
    - Meade Durbrow
    - Helmer Hembre
    - M. M. Arnold
    - R. L. Jacobson
    - John W. Holm
    - George R. Qualey
    - B. C. Wilcox
    - A. H. Emerson
    - C. A. Meister
    - L. F. Greeley
    - Benjamin Glass
    - Paul W. Lappley
    - Orville Radke
