= Wisconsin's Columbia County Assembly district =

Former American legislative district

Wisconsin's Columbia County State Assembly district
- Obsolete
- Notes: 1848–1851; 1912–1972

Wisconsin's Columbia County Assembly district was a district in the Wisconsin State Assembly for much of the history of the state of Wisconsin, up to the legislative redistricting reforms of 1972 which created the current numbered districts. Located in central Wisconsin, the district comprised the whole of Columbia County, Wisconsin, and was one of the 66 original Assembly districts defined in Article XIV of the Constitution of Wisconsin.

The district was in use for elections from 1848 through 1851, then again for elections from 1912 until 1970 (inclusive).

== List of representatives ==
List of representatives from the Columbia County district
Member	Party	Residence	Term start	Term end	Leg.
District created
Joseph Kerr	Whig	Randolph	June 5, 1848	January 7, 1850	1st 2nd
Hugh McFarlane	Dem.	Portage	January 7, 1850	January 6, 1851	3rd
William T. Bradley	Dem.	Leeds	January 6, 1851	January 5, 1852	4th
James T. Lewis	Dem.	Columbus	January 5, 1852	January 3, 1853	5th
District abolished by 1852 Wisconsin Act 499; Columbia County divided into the Columbia 1st and Columbia 2nd districts
District re-established by 1911 Wisconsin Act 661
K. A. Johnson	Rep.	Portage	January 6, 1913	January 4, 1915	51st
Robert Caldwell	Rep.	Arlington	January 4, 1915	January 1, 1917	52nd
W. R. Chipman	Rep.	Leeds	January 1, 1917	January 3, 1921	53rd 54th
Robert Caldwell	Rep.	Lodi	January 3, 1921	January 3, 1927	55th 56th 57th
Edwin Myrwyn Rowlands	Rep.	Cambria	January 3, 1927	January 7, 1935	58th 59th 60th 61st
William F. Groves	Prog.	Lodi	January 7, 1935	January 4, 1937	62nd
Robert H. Roche	Dem.	Portage	January 4, 1937	January 2, 1939	63rd
Arthur E. Austin	Rep.	Rio	January 2, 1939	January 6, 1947	64th 65th 66th 67th
Arnie F. Betts	Rep.	Lodi	January 6, 1947	January 5, 1953	68th 69th 70th
Everett Bidwell	Rep.	Portage	January 5, 1953	January 2, 1967	71st 72nd 73rd 74th 75th 76th 77th
Wesley L. Packard	Rep.	Lodi	January 2, 1967	January 4, 1971	78th 79th
Robert Thompson	Dem.	Poynette	January 4, 1971	January 1, 1973	80th
District abolished by 1971 Wisconsin Act 304; Columbia County divided into the 79th, 80th, and 81st Assembly districts
