= K. A. Johnson =

19th/20th century American politician

Member of the Wisconsin State Assembly from the Columbia County district
- In office January 6, 1913 – January 4, 1915
- Preceded by: Andrew Stevenson (1st district); Elmer E. Haight (2nd district)
- Succeeded by: Robert Caldwell

Personal details
- Born: October 8, 1848 Leeds, Wisconsin, U.S.
- Died: November 2, 1929 (aged 81) Portage, Wisconsin, U.S.
- Resting place: Silver Lake Cemetery, Portage, Wisconsin
- Party: Republican
- Spouse: Suzanna Whitelaw (m. 1883–1929)
- Children: at least 1 son & 5 daughters
- Occupation: Farmer, businessman

Knute A. Johnson (October 8, 1848 – November 2, 1929) was an American farmer, businessman, and Republican politician from Columbia County, Wisconsin. He served one term in the Wisconsin State Assembly, representing Columbia County during the 1913 term.

== Biography ==
K. A. Johnson was born on a farm in the town of Leeds, Wisconsin, in Columbia County. Johnson spent virtually his entire life in Columbia County.

In addition to managing his own farm in Leeds, for many years he also operated a general store in the neighboring unincorporated community of Morrisonville, Wisconsin. He was also president of the Arlington Farmers' Mutual Fire Insurance Company, and was involved in local politics in Leeds, serving on the town board and county board of supervisors.

In 1901, he moved into the nearby city of Portage, Wisconsin, though he continued his business interests in the Morrisonville area. In 1912, he ran for Wisconsin State Assembly, seeking the Republican Party nomination through the new primary election process. In the September primary, he defeated Elmer E. Haight, who had been the incumbent in Columbia County's 2nd Assembly district—Columbia County's two districts were abolished in the 1911 redistricting, combining into a single county-wide district. He went on to defeat the Democratic candidate George Standenmeyer in the November general election. He represented Columbia County in the 51st Wisconsin Legislature, and ran for re-election in 1914, but lost the Republican primary to Robert Caldwell.

== Personal life and family ==
K. A. Johnson married Suzanna Whitelaw, of Caledonia, Columbia County, Wisconsin, in 1883. They had at least six children and were active in the local Presbyterian church.

K. A. Johnson died at his home in Portage on Saturday, November 2, 1929. He was interred at Portage's Silver Lake Cemetery.

== Electoral history ==
Wisconsin Assembly, Columbia District Election, 1912
Party	Candidate	Votes	%	±%
General Election, November 5, 1912
Republican	K. A. Johnson	2,857	52.40%	
Democratic	George Standenmeyer	2,595	47.60%	
Plurality		262	4.81%	
Total votes		5,452	100.0%	
Republican win (new seat)				

Wisconsin State Assembly
Preceded by Andrew Stevenson (1st district); Elmer E. Haight (2nd district)	Member of the Wisconsin State Assembly from the Columbia County district January 6, 1913 – January 4, 1915	Succeeded by Robert Caldwell
