= Berninger =

Berninger is a German surname. Notable people of this name include the following:

- Dominique Berninger (1898–1949), French-born American architect
- Edmund Berninger (1843–1919), German painter
- Henry S. Berninger (1864–1934), American politician and businessman
- John Emil Berninger (1896–1981), American landscape painter and Pennsylvania impressionist
- Jules Berninger (1856–1926), Alsatian architect
- Matt Berninger (born 1971), American singer/songwriter
- Matthias Berninger (born 1971, Kassel), German politician
- Sabine Berninger (born 1971), German politician (Die Linke)
