= Frank Bauer =

Frank Bauer may refer to:

- Frank X. Bauer (1862–1922), Socialist member of the Wisconsin State Assembly
- Frank S. Bauer (1856–1936), Democrat member of the Wisconsin State Assembly
