= Theodore Engel =

American politician (1866–1935)

Theodore Engel (1866 – January 8, 1935) was an American plumber and contractor from Milwaukee, Wisconsin who spent fourteen years as a Republican member of the Wisconsin State Assembly.

== Background ==
Engel was born in Milwaukee County in 1866, attended Grace Lutheran School and public schools before dropping out to become a plumber. He pursued that trade for some years before becoming a general contractor.

== Public office ==
Engel first ran for the Assembly's 15th Milwaukee County district (15th and 19th Wards of the City of Milwaukee in 1914, as a Democrat, coming in third with 1042 votes, behind Republican George Reinhardt's 2180 votes and Socialist Charles Towsley's 1143 votes. (Republican incumbent August Dietrich was not a candidate for re-election.)

In 1916, Reinhardt was not a candidate. Engel ran as a Republican (there was no Democratic nominee in the district), and won, with 3094 votes to 1542 for Socialist Frank Bauer. Bauer challenged him again in 1918 and won by three votes, with 1,958 votes to 1,955 for Engel and 1,371 for Democrat Leonard Broennen.

Bauer was not a candidate for re-election in 1920, and was succeeded by Engel, who polled 6,368 votes to 3,280 for Socialist Arthur Richter (again, there was no Democratic candidate). He would be re-elected for the next five terms, although not always by broad margins; but lost his seat in 1932, with 5,915 votes to 6,687 for Democrat Thomas H. Caffrey and 3,101 for Socialist Charles Schalbe. He challenged Caffrey again in 1934, coming in second in a five-way race.
