= W. J. Gilboy =

American politician

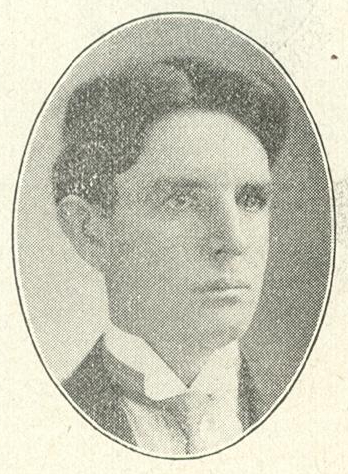
Duncan's official State Assembly portrait, 1911

William J. Gilboy (March 23, 1876 – October 16, 1934) was a teacher from Milwaukee, Wisconsin who served one term as a Socialist member of the Wisconsin State Assembly from 1911 to 1912.

== Background ==
Gilboy was born on a farm near Dundee in Fond du Lac County on March 23, 1876. Early in his life the family moved to a farm in the town of Mitchell, Sheboygan County. His education consisted of local schools, one year in high school and one term at the Oshkosh Normal School. He taught in the local public schools for two years and then moved to Milwaukee around 1900.

== Legislative service ==
He was elected to the assembly in 1910 to succeed Republican incumbent Otto Harrass in representing the 2nd Milwaukee County district (2nd and 6th wards of the City of Milwaukee), receiving 1,347 votes against 1,165 for Republican Ralph G. Bertschy (Rep.) and 989 for Democrat Jacob Engel. He was assigned to the standing committees on highways and conservation.

In 1912, after redistricting reduced his district to the second ward, he was defeated for re-election by Democrat Thomas A. Manning. In the sixth ward, now the 6th Milwaukee County district, he was succeeded by Democrat A. J. Hedding.

== Death ==
Gilboy died at the home of his brother in Mitchell on October 16, 1934.
