= Laursen =

Laursen is a Danish-Norwegian patronymic surname meaning "son of Laurs" (equivalent of Laurentius). A parallel form with a similar origin is Lauesen. Laursen may refer to the following notable people:

- Dan Laursen (born 1960), American politician from Wyoming
- Hans M. Laursen (1865–1916), American politician and businessman
- Isabella Arendt Laursen (born 1993), Danish politician
- Jacob Laursen (born 1971), Danish footballer
- Jens Laursen (1888–1967), Danish gymnast
- Martin Laursen (born 1977), Danish footballer
- Per Laursen (born 1966), Danish darts player
- Ulrik Laursen (born 1976), Danish footballer
- Valdemar Laursen (1900–1989), Danish footballer
- Zindy Laursen (born 1971), Danish musician

== See also ==
- Larsen
