= Harry Hoffman =

Harry Hoffman may refer to:

- Harry Hoffman (painter) (1871–1964), American Impressionist painter
- Harry Hoffman Jr. (born 1937), American former tennis player
- Harry Hoffman (javelin thrower) (born 1901), American javelin thrower, winner of the 1923 USA Outdoor Track and Field Championships

== See also ==
- Henry Hoffman (disambiguation)
- Harold G. Hoffman (1896–1954), American businessman and politician
