= Luck (town), Wisconsin =

Town in Polk County, Wisconsin

Luck, Wisconsin
- Town
- Town of Luck
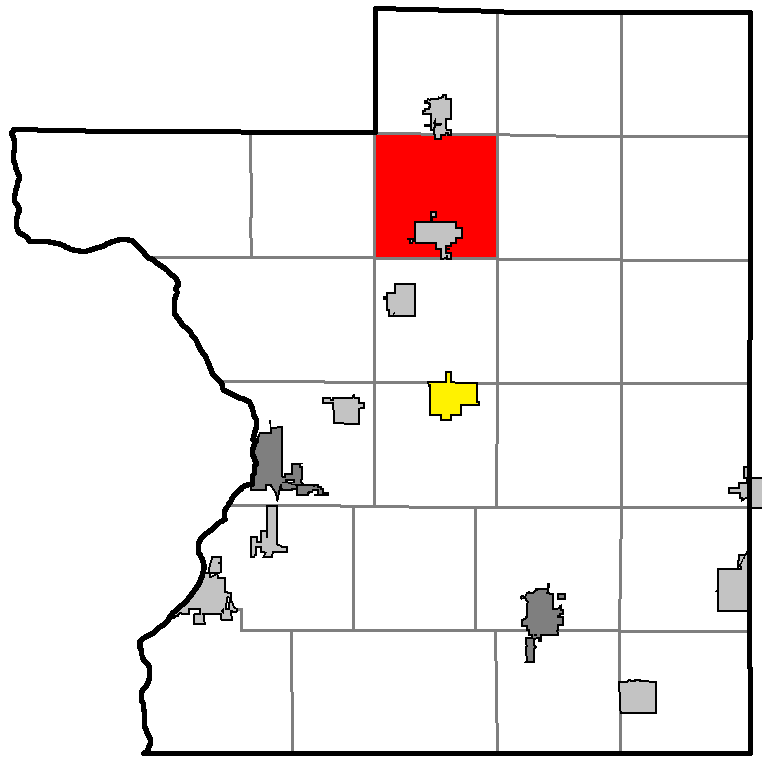
- Location of Luck, within Polk County

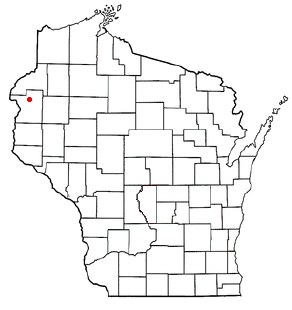
- Location of Luck, Wisconsin
- Coordinates: 45°36′20″N 92°27′30″W
- Country: United States
- State: Wisconsin
- County: Polk

Area
  - Total: 32.47 sq mi (84.1 km^{2})
  - Land: 31.79 sq mi (82.3 km^{2})
  - Water: 0.68 sq mi (1.8 km^{2})

Population (2020)
  - Total: 979
  - Density: 30.8/sq mi (11.9/km^{2})
- Time zone: UTC-6 (Central (CST))
  - Summer (DST): UTC-5 (CDT)
- Area code(s): 715 and 534
- GNIS feature ID: 1583608

Luck is a town in Polk County, Wisconsin, United States. The population was 979 at the 2020 census. The village of Luck and unincorporated community of West Denmark are located in the town. The unincorporated community of Pole Cat Crossing is also located partially in the town.

== Geography ==
According to the United States Census Bureau, the town has a total area of 32.7 square miles (84.6 km^{2}), of which 32.1 square miles (83.1 km^{2}) is land and 0.6 square mile (1.5 km^{2}) (1.72%) is water.

== Demographics ==
As of the census of 2000, there were 881 people, 339 households, and 251 families residing in the town. The population density was 27.5 people per square mile (10.6/km^{2}). There were 400 housing units at an average density of 12.5 per square mile (4.8/km^{2}). The racial makeup of the town was 98.07% White, 0.11% Black or African American, 0.45% Native American, 0.34% Asian, and 1.02% from two or more races. 0.57% of the population were Hispanic or Latino of any race.

There were 339 households, out of which 31.3% had children under the age of 18 living with them, 65.2% were married couples living together, 6.5% had a female householder with no husband present, and 25.7% were non-families. 22.4% of all households were made up of individuals, and 4.7% had someone living alone who was 65 years of age or older. The average household size was 2.60 and the average family size was 3.05.

In the town, the population was spread out, with 27.7% under the age of 18, 6.7% from 18 to 24, 25.0% from 25 to 44, 28.1% from 45 to 64, and 12.5% who were 65 years of age or older. The median age was 40 years. For every 100 females, there were 111.3 males. For every 100 females age 18 and over, there were 110.9 males.

The median income for a household in the town was $40,417, and the median income for a family was $44,659. Males had a median income of $33,571 versus $20,833 for females. The per capita income for the town was $16,096. About 6.2% of families and 9.9% of the population were below the poverty line, including 13.1% of those under age 18 and 4.9% of those age 65 or over.

== Notable people ==
- Hans M. Laursen, businessman and Wisconsin State Representative, lived in the town
