= Henry Hoffman =

Henry Hoffman may refer to:

- Henry William Hoffman (1825–1895), U.S. Representative from Maryland
- Henry W. Hoffman (1868–1963), politician from Wisconsin
