= Gov. James T. Lewis House =

Historic house in Wisconsin, United States

- U.S. National Register of Historic Places
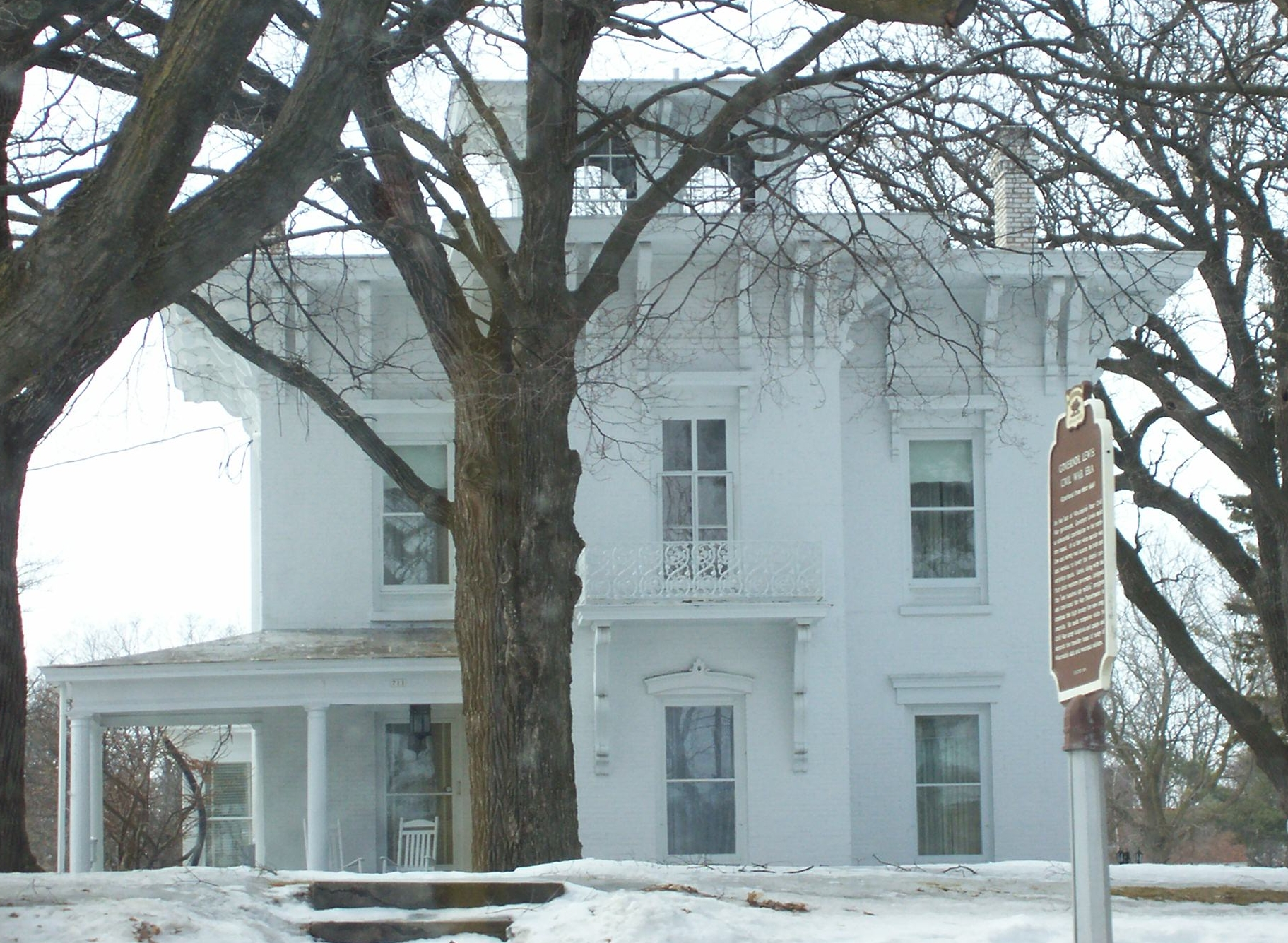
- Gov. James T. Lewis House

- Location within Wisconsin
- Location: 711 W. James St. Columbus, Wisconsin
- Coordinates: 43.34205°N 89.02173°W
- Built: 1854-56
- Architectural style: Italianate
- NRHP reference No.: 82000644
- Added to NRHP: April 9, 1982

The Gov. James T. Lewis House, also known as the Lewis-Stare House, is a historic house at 711 W. James Street in Columbus, Wisconsin, United States.

== History ==
The house was home to James T. Lewis, the ninth Governor of Wisconsin. Lewis built the house's west wing in 1854 and its east wing in 1856. The two-story Italianate house features a low hip roof topped by a cupola, a cornice with paired brackets, tall windows, and a wraparound porch supported by Tuscan columns. Lewis sold the house to his brother shortly after it was completed; local businessman Fred A. Stare, who managed the Columbus Canning Company, bought the house in 1917.

The house was added to the National Register of Historic Places on April 9, 1982. It has been valued at $499,900.
