= Robert Caldwell (Wisconsin politician) =

American politician

Member of the Wisconsin Senate from the 27th district
- In office January 3, 1927 – January 5, 1931
- Preceded by: George Staudenmayer
- Succeeded by: Fred W. Zantow

Member of the Wisconsin State Assembly from the Columbia County district
- In office January 3, 1921 – January 3, 1927
- Preceded by: W. R. Chipman
- Succeeded by: Edwin Myrwyn Rowlands
- In office January 4, 1915 – January 1, 1917
- Preceded by: K. A. Johnson
- Succeeded by: W. R. Chipman

Personal details
- Born: March 7, 1866 Arlington, Wisconsin, U.S.
- Died: August 29, 1950 (aged 84) Madison, Wisconsin, U.S.
- Party: Republican

Robert Caldwell (March 7, 1866 – August 29, 1950) was an American farmer, businessman, and politician.

== Early life ==
Born in the town of Arlington, Columbia County, Wisconsin, Caldwell was a farmer in Lodi, Wisconsin.

== Career ==
Caldwell was the president of the Columbia Bank of Lodi and the Lodi Union Agricultural Society. He served on the Lodi Board of Education, the Columbia County Board of Supervisors, and was the president of the village of Lodi. He served on the local draft board during World War I and World War II. Caldwell was active in the Republican and was a presidential elector in the 1928 United States presidential election. In 1915, 1921, 1923, and 1925, Caldwell served in the Wisconsin State Assembly. He then served in the Wisconsin Senate from 1927 to 1931.

== Personal life ==
In 1931, Caldwell and his wife moved to Madison, Wisconsin. Caldwell died in a hospital in Madison, Wisconsin, after an illness of few months.
