= James T. Lewis =

American politician (1819–1904)

James Taylor Lewis
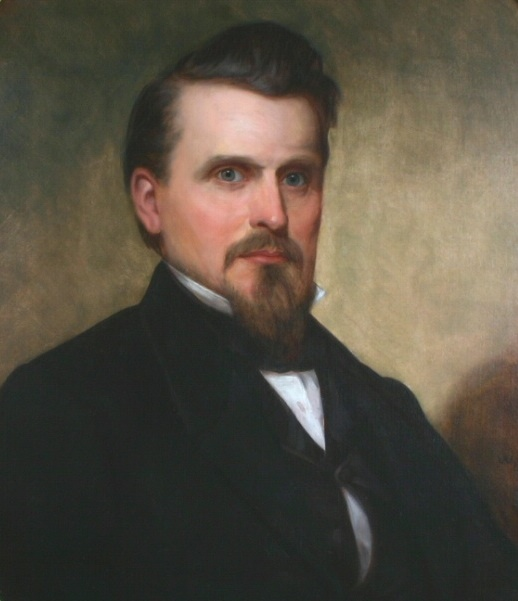

9th Governor of Wisconsin
- In office January 4, 1864 – January 1, 1866
- Lieutenant: Wyman Spooner
- Preceded by: Edward Salomon
- Succeeded by: Lucius Fairchild

7th Secretary of State of Wisconsin
- In office January 6, 1862 – January 5, 1864
- Governor: Louis P. Harvey; Edward Salomon
- Preceded by: Louis Harvey
- Succeeded by: Lucius Fairchild

4th Lieutenant Governor of Wisconsin
- In office January 2, 1854 – January 7, 1856
- Governor: William Barstow
- Preceded by: Timothy Burns
- Succeeded by: Arthur MacArthur Sr.

Member of the Wisconsin Senate from the 25th district
- In office January 3, 1853 – January 2, 1854
- Preceded by: Position Established
- Succeeded by: John Q. Adams

Member of the Wisconsin State Assembly from the Columbia County district
- In office January 5, 1852 – January 3, 1853
- Preceded by: William T. Bradley
- Succeeded by: Orrin D. Coleman

Personal details
- Born: James Taylor Lewis; October 30, 1819 Clarendon, New York, U.S.
- Died: August 5, 1904 (aged 84) Columbus, Wisconsin, U.S.
- Resting place: Hillside Cemetery; Columbus, Wisconsin
- Party: Republican; Democratic (before 1861)
- Spouse: Orlina M. Sturgis
- Children: Seldon James Lewis; (b. 1850; died 1912); Charles R. Lewis; (b. 1854; died 1922); Annie L.
- Parents: Shubael Lewis (father); Eleanor (Robertson) Lewis (mother)
- Profession: lawyer, politician
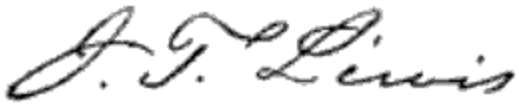
- Signature

James Taylor Lewis (October 30, 1819 – August 5, 1904) was an American lawyer and politician who served as the ninth governor of Wisconsin (1864–1866). Prior to his election as governor, he was the seventh secretary of State of Wisconsin (1862–1864) and the fourth lieutenant governor of Wisconsin (1854–1856), and served one year each in the Wisconsin State Senate (1853) and Assembly (1852).

== Early life ==
Lewis was born in Clarendon in Orleans County, New York, to Shubael Lewis and his first wife, Eleanor (née Robertson). His father was a farmer and colonel in the New York State militia, and came to own large estates in New York and Wisconsin Territory. James Lewis was the third of four sons, his brothers were William L. Lewis, Shubael R. Lewis, and Hiram W. Lewis. His mother died in 1834, and his father's second wife, Parna Nichols, assisted in raising him.

He received a common school education and completed a course of English and classical study at Clarkson Academy and Clinton Seminary. He was interested from an early age in military affairs, and participated in the New York Militia. He was made a sergeant in 1838, and, in 1840, was made a lieutenant in the 215th Regiment. In 1842, he began studying law at Clarkson, New York, under Henry R. Selden, who later became Lieutenant Governor of New York. After completing his studies, he was offered a legal partnership in Clinton, New York, but declined. He instead chose to move west to the Wisconsin Territory and established himself at Columbus, which remained his principal residence for the rest of his life.

== Career ==
He taught school briefly in the district schools around Clarkson. In 1842, he began the study of law with former New York lieutenant governor Henry R. Selden. In 1845 he moved to what is now Columbus, Wisconsin, where he was admitted to the bar.

Between 1846 and 1852, Lewis held the positions of district attorney and county judge and was elected to terms in both the Wisconsin State Assembly and the State Senate. He was also a member or the Wisconsin Constitutional Convention of 1847–1848, representing Columbia County. Lewis was a member of the Independent Order of Odd Fellows in Columbus (Columbia Lodge #40) and served as Noble Grand of the Lodge in 1851. He also served as the fourth Lieutenant Governor of Wisconsin from 1854 to 1856, Wisconsin secretary of state from 1862 to 1864.

Nominated by the Union Republicans for governor, Lewis was elected and served as Governor of Wisconsin from January 6, 1864, until January 5, 1866. He was the last Wisconsin governor to hold the office during the Civil War. and was concerned during his tenure with providing sufficient troops for the Civil War and helping to protect them and their dependents. He visited troops in the field and helped establish hospitals in Wisconsin for the care of the wounded. Refusing renomination in 1865, he was offered a diplomatic post by President Lincoln, but chose instead to return to his law practice in Columbus.

== Death and legacy ==
Lewis died in Columbus, Wisconsin, on August 4, 1904. He is interred at Hillside Cemetery, Columbus, Columbia County, Wisconsin. His former home, now known as the Gov. James T. Lewis House, is listed on the National Register of Historic Places.

== Family life ==
Lewis married Orlina M. Sturgis, of Clarkson, New York, in 1845. They had four children together, though their first son died in infancy. He named his second son Selden, in honor of his law instructor, Henry R. Selden. His third son, Charles, was named for Charles D. Robinson.

His elder brother, Shubael R. Lewis, won esteem at the Battle of Chapultepec in the Mexican–American War.

== Bibliography ==
- Sobel, Robert; Raimo, John W. (1978). Biographical Directory of the Governors of the United States, 1789–1978. Vol. IV (illustrated ed.). Meckler Books. ISBN 978-0-930-46604-6 – via Google Books.
- White, James Terry (1904). The National Cyclopaedia of American Biography. Vol. XII. J.T. White – via Google Books.

Party political offices
Preceded by Timothy Burns	Democratic nominee for Lieutenant Governor of Wisconsin; 1853	Succeeded by Arthur MacArthur Sr.
Preceded by Louis P. Harvey	Republican nominee for Secretary of State of Wisconsin; 1861	Succeeded by Lucius Fairchild
Preceded by Louis P. Harvey	Republican nominee for Governor of Wisconsin; 1863	Succeeded by Lucius Fairchild
Wisconsin State Assembly
Preceded by William T. Bradley	Member of the Wisconsin State Assembly from the Columbia County district January 5, 1852 – January 3, 1853	Succeeded by Orrin D. Coleman
Wisconsin Senate
New district	Member of the Wisconsin Senate from the 25th district January 3, 1853 – January 2, 1854	Succeeded by John Q. Adams
Political offices
Preceded by Timothy Burns	Lieutenant Governor of Wisconsin; 1854 – 1856	Succeeded by Arthur MacArthur Sr.
Preceded by Louis P. Harvey	Secretary of State of Wisconsin; 1862 – 1864	Succeeded by Lucius Fairchild
Preceded by Edward Salomon	Governor of Wisconsin; 1864 – 1866	Succeeded by Lucius Fairchild
