= West Denmark, Wisconsin =

- Unincorporated community
- Location within Wisconsin Location within the United States
- Coordinates: 45°34′12″N 92°30′35″W
- Country: United States
- State: Wisconsin
- County: Polk
- Elevation: 1,253 ft (382 m)
- Time zone: UTC-6 (Central (CST))
  - Summer (DST): UTC-5 (CDT)
- Area codes: 715 & 534
- GNIS feature ID: 1576495

West Denmark is an unincorporated community located in the town of Luck, Polk County, Wisconsin, United States. West Denmark is 1,250 feet [381 m] above sea level.

West Denmark is known throughout its area for its active community and strong roots in Danish culture. The community continues to host events such as an Æbleskiver Dinner, Fastelavn celebration, and a summer family camp. Most of these events are held on the grounds of the West Denmark Lutheran Church.
