= Pound (town), Wisconsin =

Pound, Wisconsin
- Town
- Town of Pound
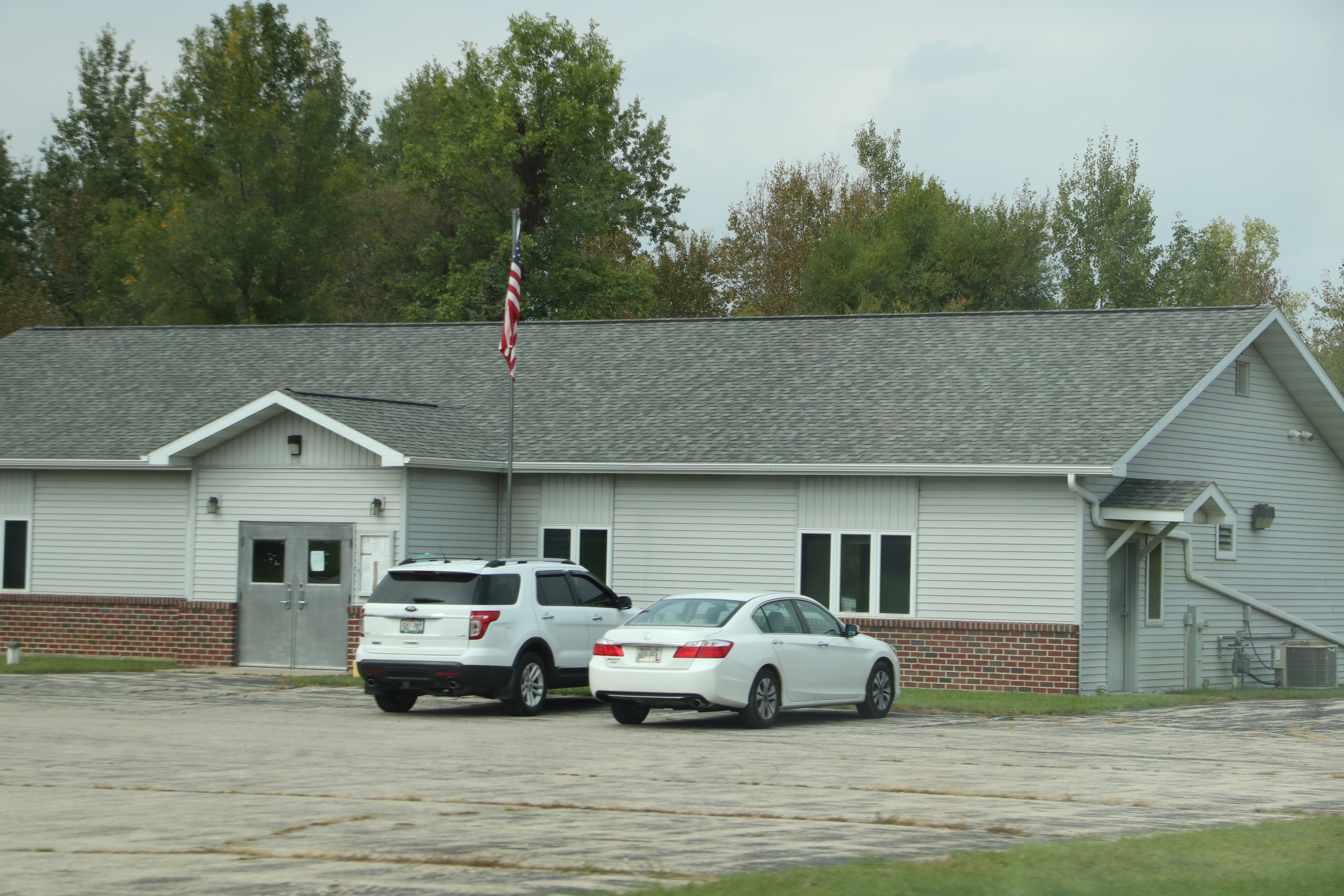
- Town Hall

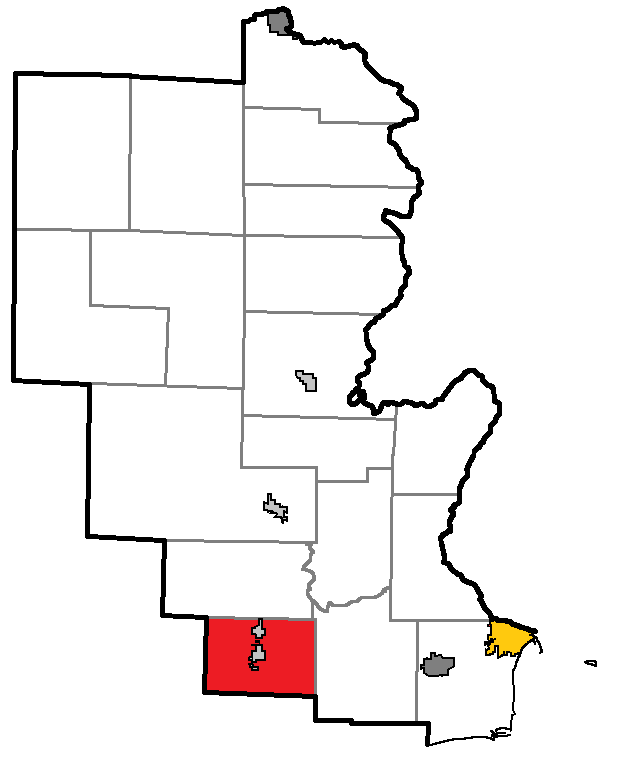
- Location of Pound, within Marinette County
- Coordinates: 45°02′22″N 87°59′15″W
- Country: United States
- State: Wisconsin
- County: Marinette

Area
  - Total: 49.90 sq mi (129.2 km^{2})
  - Land: 49.53 sq mi (128.3 km^{2})
  - Water: 0.38 sq mi (0.98 km^{2})

Population (2020)
  - Total: 1,412
  - Density: 28.51/sq mi (11.01/km^{2})
- Time zone: UTC-6 (Central (CST))
  - Summer (DST): UTC-5 (CDT)
- Area code(s): 920 & 274
- GNIS feature ID: 1583967

Pound is a town in Marinette County, Wisconsin, United States. The population was 1,412 at the 2020 census. The village of Pound is located within but politically independent of the town.

== Geography ==
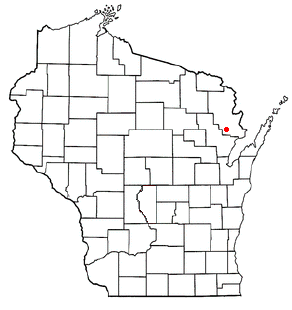
Location of Pound (town), Wisconsin

According to the United States Census Bureau, the town has a total area of 50.2 square miles (130.1 km^{2}), of which 49.9 square miles (129.3 km^{2}) is land and 0.3 square mile (0.8 km^{2}) (0.60%) is water.

== Demographics ==
At the 2000 United States census there were 1,367 people, 499 households, and 387 families in the town. The population density was 27.4 inhabitants per square mile (10.6/km^{2}). There were 537 housing units at an average density of 10.8 per square mile (4.2/km^{2}). The racial makeup of the town was 99.27% White, 0.29% Native American, 0.07% Asian, 0.07% from other races, and 0.29% from two or more races. 0.37% of the population were Hispanic or Latino of any race. Of the 499 households 36.1% had children under the age of 18 living with them, 69.5% were married couples living together, 4.8% had a female householder with no husband present, and 22.4% were non-families. 19.8% of households were one person and 7.6% were one person aged 65 or older. The average household size was 2.74 and the average family size was 3.16.

The age distribution was 28.5% under the age of 18, 7.8% from 18 to 24, 26.5% from 25 to 44, 24.1% from 45 to 64, and 13.2% 65 or older. The median age was 38 years. For every 100 females, there were 111.3 males. For every 100 females age 18 and over, there were 109.7 males.

The median household income was $38,750 and the median family income was $44,205. Males had a median income of $30,288 versus $21,205 for females. The per capita income for the town was $17,029. About 4.3% of families and 5.8% of the population were below the poverty line, including 6.5% of those under age 18 and 7.8% of those age 65 or over.
