= Edward J. Burke =

American politician

Member of the Wisconsin State Assembly
- In office 1913–1914

Personal details
- Born: May 19, 1876
- Died: November 2, 1935 (aged 59) Milwaukee, Wisconsin
- Party: Democrat

Edward J. Burke (May 19, 1876 - November 2, 1935) was an American machinist from Milwaukee, Wisconsin who was a justice of the peace, and spent a single term as a Democratic member of the Wisconsin State Assembly. He went to law school in the evening in Chicago, Illinois and Milwaukee.

He was elected in 1912 to the newly redistricted 16th Milwaukee County Assembly district (the 16th Ward of the City of Milwaukee, the Town of Wauwatosa and the City of Wauwatosa). He was defeated for re-election in 1914 by Republican William A. Schroeder.
