= Philip Gannon (Wisconsin politician) =

Philip Gannon (February 22, 1870, in Syracuse, New York – ?) was an American politician. He was a member of the Wisconsin State Assembly. He was elected to the Assembly as a Republican in 1912. Additionally, he was an alderman of Superior, Wisconsin.
