= Elmer E. Haight =

American politician

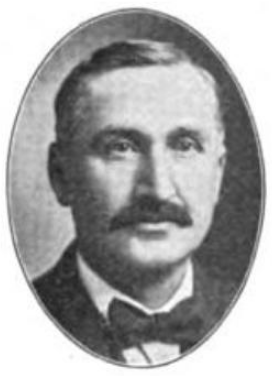

Member of the Wisconsin State Assembly
- In office 1908–1912
- Constituency: Columbia County Second District

Personal details
- Born: April 1, 1861 Empire, Wisconsin
- Died: February 11, 1934 (aged 72) Poynette, Wisconsin
- Party: Republican
- Occupation: Farmer, postmaster, politician

Elmer E. Haight (April 1, 1861 – February 11, 1934) was an American businessman, farmer, and politician.

Haight was born in the town of Empire, Fond du Lac County, Wisconsin, the son of James H. Haight and Caroline Haight. Haight moved with his parents to Fond du Lac, Wisconsin where he went to Fond du Lac High School. Haight then moved to Lowville, Columbia County, Wisconsin in 1876 and was a farmer. He married Stella E. Scott (1866–1907). In 1909 and 1911, Haight served in the Wisconsin State Assembly and was a Republican. Haight moved to Poynette, Wisconsin around 1917, where he had a hardware and cold storage business. Haight was serving as postmaster for Poynette when he died. He died at his home in Poynette, Wisconsin after a short illness.
