= Jacob J. Killa =

American politician

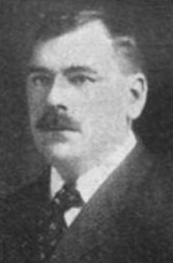

Member of the Wisconsin State Assembly
- In office 1915, 1919

Personal details
- Born: July 5, 1879 Milwaukee, Wisconsin, US
- Died: May 13, 1932 (aged 52) Milwaukee, Wisconsin, US
- Party: Democratic
- Education: Marquette University
- Occupation: Businessman, politician

Jacob J. Killa (July 5, 1879 – May 13, 1932) was an American politician and businessman.

== Biography ==
Born in Milwaukee, Wisconsin, Killa went to Marquette University. He was the sales manager for the Standard Steel Company and a real estate broker. He served in the Wisconsin State Assembly in 1915 and 1919 and was a Democrat. Killa died in a hospital in Milwaukee.
