= John P. Donnelly =

American lawyer and politician

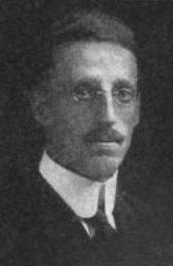

Member of the Wisconsin State Assembly
- In office 1915–1921

Personal details
- Born: July 24, 1886 Milwaukee, Wisconsin, US
- Died: May 4, 1949 (aged 62) Milwaukee, Wisconsin, US
- Party: Democratic
- Education: Marquette University Law School
- Occupation: Lawyer, politician

John P. Donnelly (July 24, 1886 – May 4, 1949) was an American lawyer and politician.

== Biography ==
Born in Milwaukee, Wisconsin, Donnelly received his bachelor's degree from Marquette University in 1907 and his law degree from Marquette University Law School in 1911. Donnelly practiced law in Milwaukee and served as an assistant district attorney for Milwaukee County from 1923 to 1932. Donnelly served in the Wisconsin State Assembly from 1915 to 1921 and was involved with the Democratic Party. Donnelly died in a hospital in Milwaukee, Wisconsin from a heart attack.
