= Albert E. Schwittay =

American politician

Albert E. Schwittay (January 17, 1874 – January 19, 1913) was an American lawyer, newspaper publisher, and Republican politician.

Born in Germany, Schwittay emigrated with his parents to the United States and settled in Pound, Marinette County, Wisconsin. Schwittay worked in the lumber business and was a farmer. He went to University of Wisconsin Law School, received his law degree, and practiced law in Marinette, Wisconsin. Schwittay also started a newspaper The Searchlight a weekly newspaper. In 1908, Schwittay was elected district attorney of Marinette County and then was elected sheriff of Marinette County in 1910.

In 1913, Schwittay served in the Wisconsin State Assembly and was a Republican. Schwittay was accused and tried for embezzlement and forgery and misconduct in office. While, district attorney, Schwittay was disbarred from practicing law. Schwittay died suddenly in Madison, Wisconsin from pneumonia. James Larson was elected to succeed Schwittay in a special election.
