= James Larson =

American politician (1855–1923)

James Larson (1855 – May 11, 1923) was an American marine captain and politician.

Born in Denmark, Larson emigrated to the United States in 1871 and settled in Racine, Wisconsin. He then moved to Door County, Wisconsin and then to Marinette, Wisconsin in 1883. Larson was a ship captain and ship builder. He served on the Marinette Common Council and on the Marinette County, Wisconsin Board of Supervisors. In 1913, Larson was elected to the Wisconsin State Assembly, succeeding Albert E. Schwittay, who died while in office. Larson was an independent. He died at his daughter's house in Kenosha, Wisconsin.
