= Frank X. Bauer =

American politician (1862–1922)

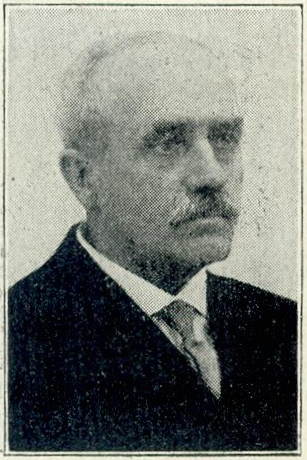
- Bauer c. 1919

Member of the Wisconsin State Assembly
- In office 1919–1921

Personal details
- Born: October 4, 1862 Kingdom of Bavaria
- Died: December 28, 1922 (aged 60)

Frank X. Bauer (October 4, 1862 – December 28, 1922) was an American brewery worker and beer truck driver from Milwaukee, Wisconsin who served one term as a Socialist member of the Wisconsin State Assembly.

== Background ==
Bauer was born in the Kingdom of Bavaria on October 4, 1862. He received his education in the country school near his home. In 1888 he came to America, going directly to Milwaukee. Two years later he went to work for a brewery and for 21 years was a bottled beer distributor. As of 1919 he had belonged to the Beer Drivers Union Local #72 for 27 years, and for four years had been secretary and business agent for the Beer Drivers, Chauffeurs and Stablemen's Union Local 72, for Engineers' and Firemen's Union Local 25, and for Maltsters Union Local 89. He served as alderman of the 19th Ward of the City of Milwaukee for two years.

== Legislative service ==
Bauer was elected to the Assembly in 1918 for the 15th Milwaukee County assembly district (the 15th and 19th wards of the City of Milwaukee), with 1,958 votes to 1,955 for incumbent Republican State Representative Theodore Engel (to whom Bauer had lost in the 1916 election for the same seat) and 1,371 for Democrat Leonard Broennen. He was assigned to the standing committee on contingent expenditures.

He was not a candidate for re-election in 1920, and was succeeded by Engel. He died on December 28, 1922.
