= John L. Schnitzler =

John L. Schnitzler was an American politician. He was a member of the Wisconsin State Assembly.

== Biography ==
John L. Schnitzler was born on August 29, 1866 in Manitowoc County, Wisconsin. As a child, Schnitzler moved with his parents to De Pere, Wisconsin. He was a career newspaperman, including as an editor of the Milwaukee Sentinel.

Schnitzler was elected to the Assembly in 1912. He was a member of the Republican Party.
