= Arthur H. Gruenewald =

American lawyer, banker, and politician

Arthur H. Gruenewald (May 20, 1885 – December 12, 1961) was an American lawyer, banker, and politician.

Born in Oshkosh, Wisconsin, Gruenewald went to Oshkosh Normal School (now University of Wisconsin–Oshkosh). He then received his bachelor's degree from the University of Wisconsin in 1908 and his law degree from University of Wisconsin Law School in 1909. Gruenewald then practiced law in Oshkosh. He also served on the board of directors of the New American Bank of Oshkosh and was chairman of the board. In 1915, Gruenewald served in the Wisconsin State Assembly and was a Democrat. In 1935 and 1936, Gruenewald served as postmaster of Oshkosh and also served on the Oshkosh Public Library Board of Trustees. Gruenewald died in Oshkosh, Wisconsin.
