= Bangor (town), Wisconsin =

Town in La Crosse County, Wisconsin

Bangor, Wisconsin
- Town
- Town of Bangor
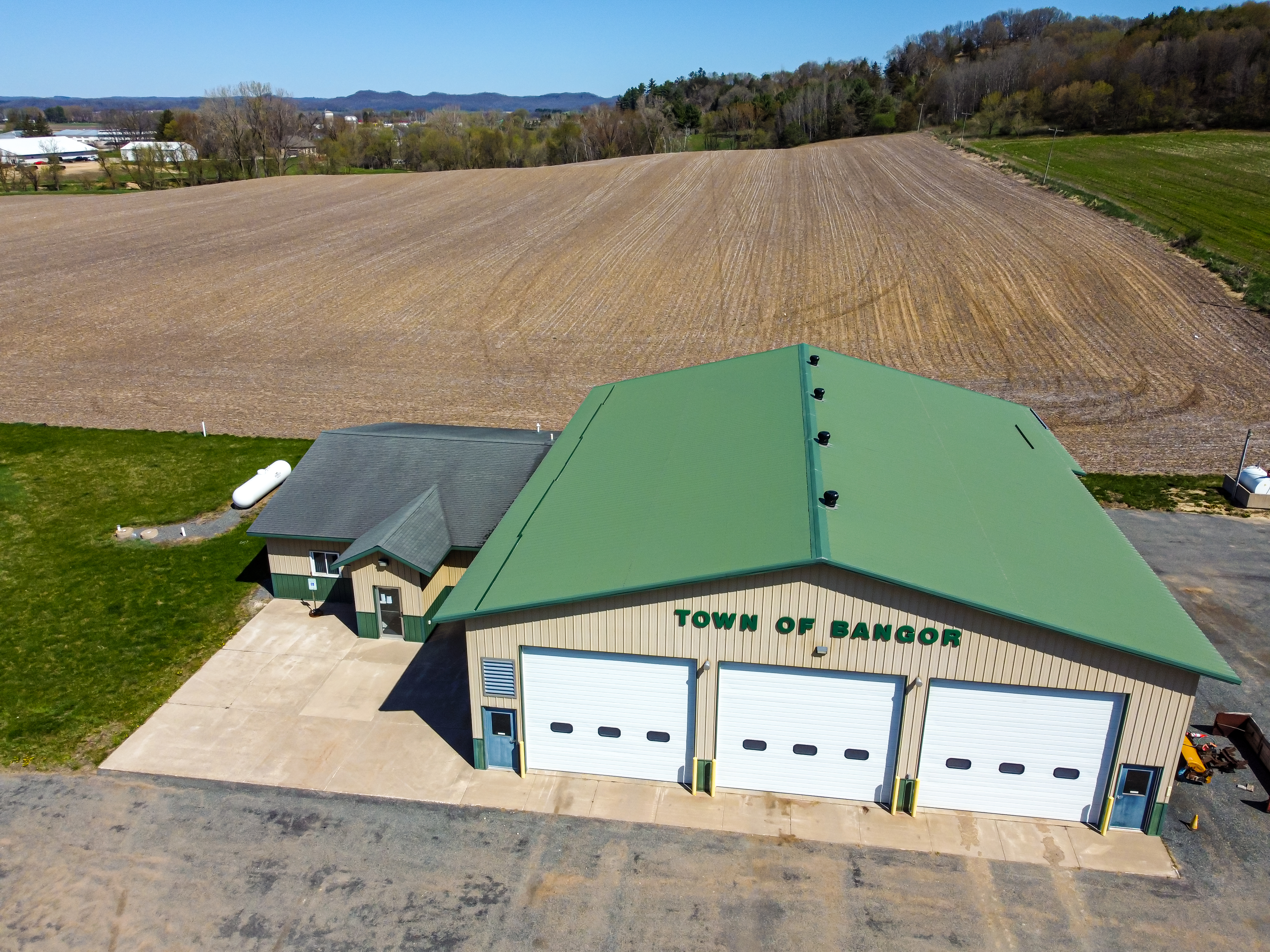
- Bangor Town Hall

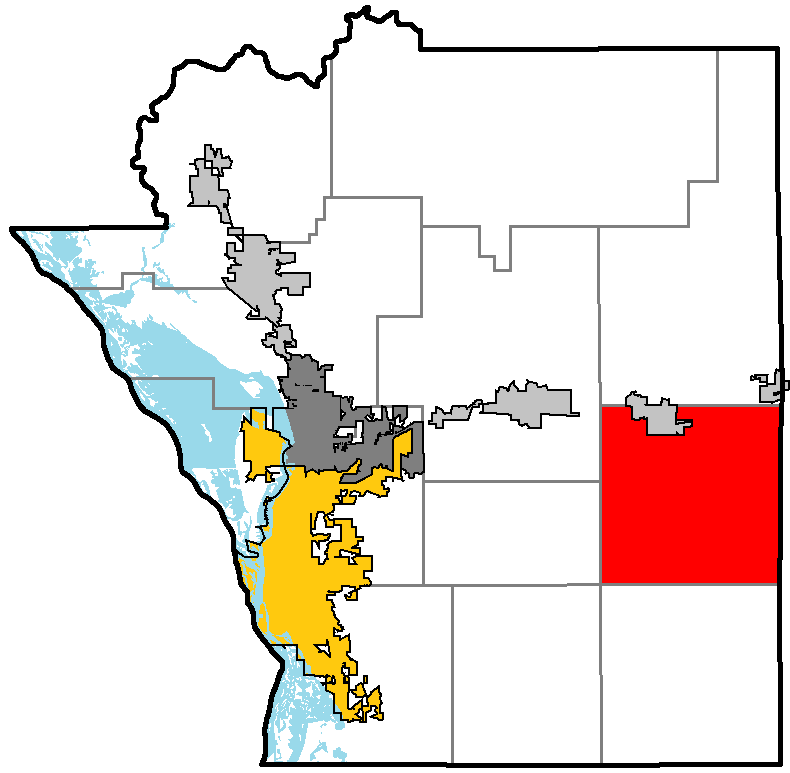
- Location of Bangor, La Crosse County

- Location of La Crosse County, Wisconsin
- Coordinates: 43°51′17″N 90°58′13″W
- Country: United States
- State: Wisconsin
- County: La Crosse

Area
  - Total: 34.68 sq mi (89.8 km^{2})
  - Land: 34.68 sq mi (89.8 km^{2})
  - Water: 0 sq mi (0 km^{2})

Population (2020)
  - Total: 617
  - Density: 17.8/sq mi (6.87/km^{2})
- Time zone: UTC-6 (Central (CST))
  - Summer (DST): UTC-5 (CDT)
- Area code(s): 608 and 353
- GNIS feature ID: 1561148
- Website: https://townofbangor.com/

Bangor (/ˈbæŋɡɔːr/ BANG-gor) is a town in La Crosse County, Wisconsin, United States. It is part of the La Crosse, Wisconsin Metropolitan Statistical Area. The population was 617 at the 2020 census. The Village of Bangor is located partially within the town.

== Geography ==
According to the United States Census Bureau, the town has a total area of 35.0 square miles (90.7 km^{2}), all land.

== Demographics ==
As of the census of 2000, there were 583 people, 216 households, and 165 families residing in the town. The population density was 16.6 people per square mile (6.4/km^{2}). There were 227 housing units at an average density of 6.5 per square mile (2.5/km^{2}). The racial makeup of the town was 99.14% White, 0.17% Native American, and 0.69% from two or more races. 0.69% of the population were Hispanic or Latino of any race.

There were 216 households, out of which 33.8% had children under the age of 18 living with them, 67.1% were married couples living together, 6.5% had a female householder with no husband present, and 23.6% were non-families. 17.6% of all households were made up of individuals, and 7.9% had someone living alone who was 65 years of age or older. The average household size was 2.70 and the average family size was 3.08.

In the town, the population was spread out, with 26.8% under the age of 18, 7.0% from 18 to 24, 29.0% from 25 to 44, 24.2% from 45 to 64, and 13.0% who were 65 years of age or older. The median age was 40 years. For every 100 females, there were 99.7 males. For every 100 females age 18 and over, there were 101.4 males.

The median income for a household in the town was $44,219, and the median income for a family was $47,500. Males had a median income of $31,750 versus $20,250 for females. The per capita income for the town was $17,800. About 3.8% of families and 3.9% of the population were below the poverty line, including none of those under age 18 and 16.9% of those age 65 or over.

== Notable people ==
- Otto Bosshard, lawyer and Wisconsin legislator, was born in the town
