= James Dolan (Wisconsin politician) =

American politician

James Dolan (December 17, 1863 – July 6, 1939) was an American lawyer, educator, and politician.

Born in the town of Belmont, Lafayette County, Wisconsin, Dolan grew up on a farm. He then graduated from Platteville Normal School in 1891, taught school, and was principal in Platteville, Wisconsin. In 1897, Dolan received his law degree from University of Wisconsin Law School and then practiced law in Platteville. Dolan served on the Grant County Board of Supervisors and on the school board. He served as mayor of Platteville from 1907 to 1910. In 1913, Dolan served in the Wisconsin State Assembly and was a Democrat. He also served as Wisconsin Circuit Court commissioner and city justice. Dolan died of a heart attack on a street in Platteville, Wisconsin.
