= Charles Schultz (politician) =

American politician

Charles Schultz (1858-1928) was a politician and member of the Wisconsin State Assembly, representing the 2nd District of Winnebago County, Wisconsin. A Democrat, he was elected in 1912. He was born on January 18, 1858, in Harrison, Ohio. He died in 1928.
