= Martin T. Battis =

American businessman and politician

Martin T. Battis (August 15, 1870 – May 13, 1947) was an American businessman and politician.

Born in Oshkosh, Wisconsin, Battis was one of the owners of Battis Brothers, a boiler manufacturer and mill supply business. Battis served on the Oshkosh Common Council and was president of the common council. In 1913 and 1917, Battis served in the Wisconsin State Assembly and was a Republican. Battis died in Oshkosh, Wisconsin.
