= Jacob J. Aulenbacher =

American politician (1857–1931)

Member of the Wisconsin State Assembly

Personal details
- Born: May 3, 1857 Richfield, Wisconsin, U.S.
- Died: February 26, 1931 (aged 73) near Richfield, Wisconsin, U.S.
- Party: Republican
- Occupation: Politician

Jacob J. Aulenbacher (May 3, 1857 – February 26, 1931) was an American politician who served as a member of the Wisconsin State Assembly.

== Biography ==
Aulenbacher was born on May 3, 1857, in Richfield, Washington County, Wisconsin. He died at his farm near Richfield on February 26, 1931.

== Career ==
Aulenbacher was a member of the Assembly during the 1915 and 1917 sessions. Other positions he held include Town Supervisor, Assessor and Town Chairman of Richfield. He was also a member of the Washington County, Wisconsin Republican committee.
