= Edward C. Meland =

American politician

Edward C. Meland (January 30, 1866 – February 12, 1939) was an American educator, newspaper editor, and politician.

Born to Norwegian immigrants in the town of Leeds, Columbia County, Wisconsin, Meland was educated in the public school and at Northwestern Business College. In 1889, Meland graduated from the University of Wisconsin, taught at Northwestern Business School from 1889 to 1893, and then taught school in Deerfield, Wisconsin from 1893 to 1895. Deland was the founder and publisher of The DeForest Times and in 1895 he became the principal of DeForest High School in DeForest, Wisconsin. Meland served as town and village clerk, village trustee, and on the school board in DeForest, Wisconsin. In 1913, Meland served in the Wisconsin State Assembly and was a Republican. Meland died of a stroke at his home in DeForest, Wisconsin.
