= Thomas A. Manning =

American politician (1886–1944)

Member of the Wisconsin State Assembly
- In office 1913–1915

Personal details
- Born: October 15, 1886 Milwaukee, Wisconsin, U.S.
- Died: April 4, 1944 (aged 57) Milwaukee, Wisconsin, U.S.
- Education: Marquette University Law School
- Occupation: Politician, lawyer, judge

Thomas A. Manning (October 15, 1886 – April 4, 1944) was an American politician, lawyer, and judge who served as a member of the Wisconsin State Assembly from 1913 to 1915.

== Biography ==
Manning was born on October 15, 1886, in Milwaukee, Wisconsin. He would later captain the Marquette Golden Avalanche football team. Manning was a member of the Knights of Columbus. He died in Milwaukee on April 4, 1944. A tribute to him was read by the Assembly.

== Political career ==
Manning was a member of the Assembly from 1913 to 1915. Additionally, he was a Milwaukee alderman from 1914 to 1916. He was a candidate for city attorney in 1922 and for civil judge in 1933.
