= Arlington (town), Wisconsin =

Arlington, Wisconsin
- Town
- Town of Arlington
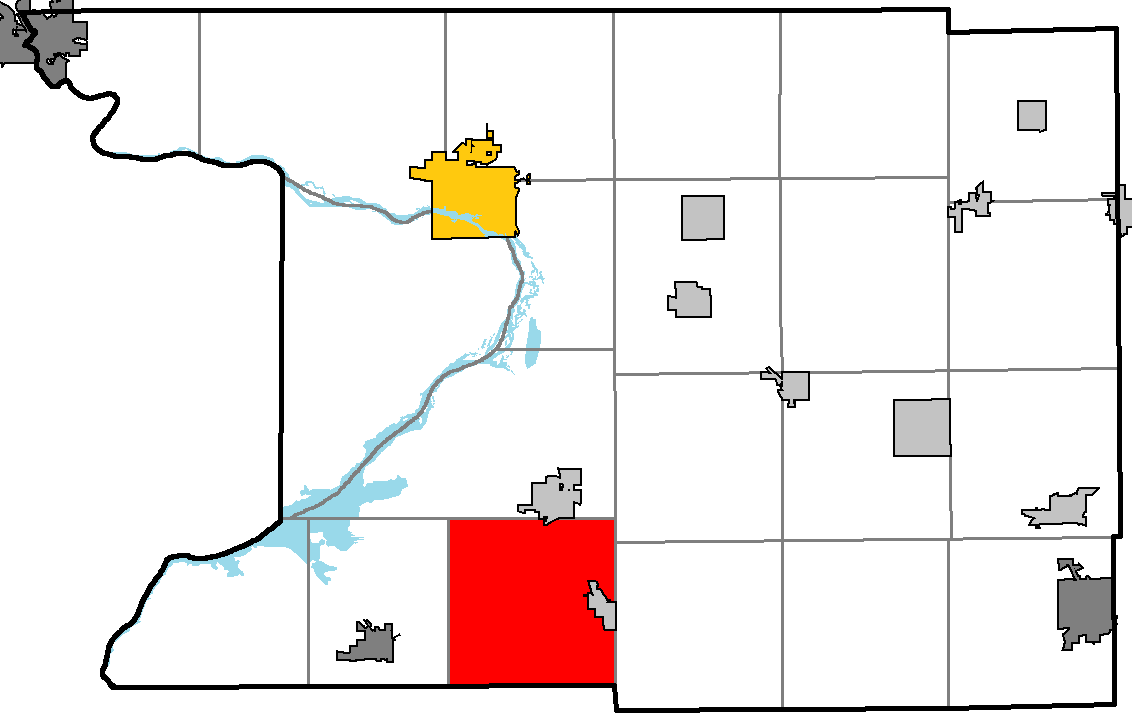
- Location of Arlington, within Columbia County, Wisconsin

- Location of Columbia County, Wisconsin
- Coordinates: 43°19′59″N 89°25′55″W
- Country: United States
- State: Wisconsin
- County: Columbia

Area
  - Total: 34.89 sq mi (90.4 km^{2})
  - Land: 34.81 sq mi (90.2 km^{2})
  - Water: 0.08 sq mi (0.21 km^{2})

Population (2020)
  - Total: 803
  - Density: 23.1/sq mi (8.91/km^{2})
- Time zone: UTC-6 (Central (CST))
  - Summer (DST): UTC-5 (CDT)
- Area code(s): 608 and 353
- GNIS feature ID: 1582714
- Website: https://www.arlingtontown-wi.com/

Arlington is a town in Columbia County, Wisconsin, United States. The population was 803 at the 2020 census. The Village of Arlington is located within the town.

== Geography ==
According to the United States Census Bureau, the town has a total area of 35.3 square miles (91.3 km^{2}), of which 35.2 square miles (91.2 km^{2}) is land and 0.1 square mile (0.1 km^{2}) (0.14%) is water.

== Demographics ==
As of the census of 2000, there were 848 people, 302 households, and 240 families residing in the town. The population density was 24.1 people per square mile (9.3/km^{2}). There were 308 housing units at an average density of 8.7 per square mile (3.4/km^{2}). The racial makeup of the town was 99.65% White, 0.12% Native American, and 0.24% from two or more races. 0.12% of the population were Hispanic or Latino of any race.

There were 302 households, out of which 37.7% had children under the age of 18 living with them, 73.2% were married couples living together, 4.3% had a female householder with no husband present, and 20.5% were non-families. 13.9% of all households were made up of individuals, and 4% had someone living alone who was 65 years of age or older. The average household size was 2.81 and the average family size was 3.14.

In the town, the population was spread out, with 27.5% under the age of 18, 6.5% from 18 to 24, 28.1% from 25 to 44, 29.2% from 45 to 64, and 8.7% who were 65 years of age or older. The median age was 39 years. For every 100 females, there were 116.9 males. For every 100 females age 18 and over, there were 112.8 males.

The median income for a household in the town was $58,750, and the median income for a family was $61,111. Males had a median income of $35,357 versus $29,231 for females. The per capita income for the town was $23,880. About 2.4% of families and 4.2% of the population were below the poverty line, including 3.6% of those under age 18 and 8.2% of those age 65 or over.

== Notable people ==
- Robert Caldwell, farmer, businessman, and Wisconsin politician; born in the town
