= Otto Bosshard =

American lawyer and politician

Otto Bosshard (August 9, 1876 – October 11, 1943) was an American lawyer and politician.

Born in the town of Bangor, La Crosse County, Wisconsin, Bosshard went to the public schools in La Crosse, Wisconsin. Bosshard received his bachelor's degree in 1898 from University of Wisconsin. In 1900, Bosshard received his law degree from Georgetown College of Law in Washington, D.C. Bosshard practiced law in La Crosse, Wisconsin. From 1903 to 1909, Bosshard served as district attorney for La Crosse County. He was also the president of the Bank of Holmen in Holmen, Wisconsin. From 1911 to 1917, Bosshard served in the Wisconsin State Assembly and was a Republican. Bosshard died at his home in La Crosse, Wisconsin.
