= W. R. Chipman =

American politician

William R. Chipman
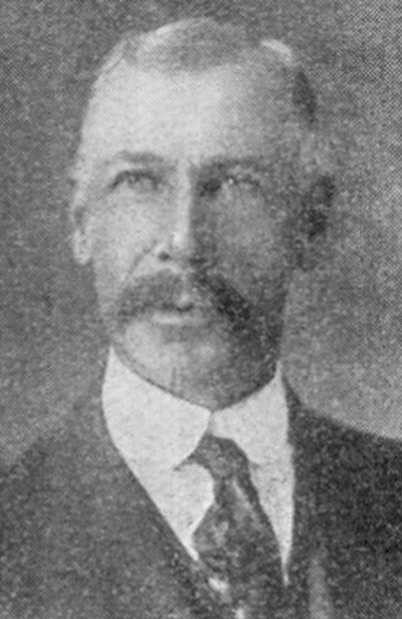

Member of the Wisconsin State Assembly
- In office 1917, 1919

Personal details
- Born: May 10, 1863 Leeds, Wisconsin, US
- Died: October 7, 1932 (aged 69) Leeds, Wisconsin, US
- Party: Republican

William R. Chipman (May 10, 1863 – October 7, 1932) was a member of the Wisconsin State Assembly during the 1917 and 1919 sessions. Other positions he held include justice of the peace, chairman of the Columbia County, Wisconsin Board of Supervisors and Chairman (similar to mayor) of Leeds, Wisconsin. He was a Republican.

Chipman was born in Leeds on May 10, 1863. He died at his home in Leeds in 1932.
