= George Reinhardt =

American politician

George Reinhardt was an American politician from Milwaukee, Wisconsin who spent one term as a Republican member of the Wisconsin State Assembly.
