= Leeds, Wisconsin =

- Town
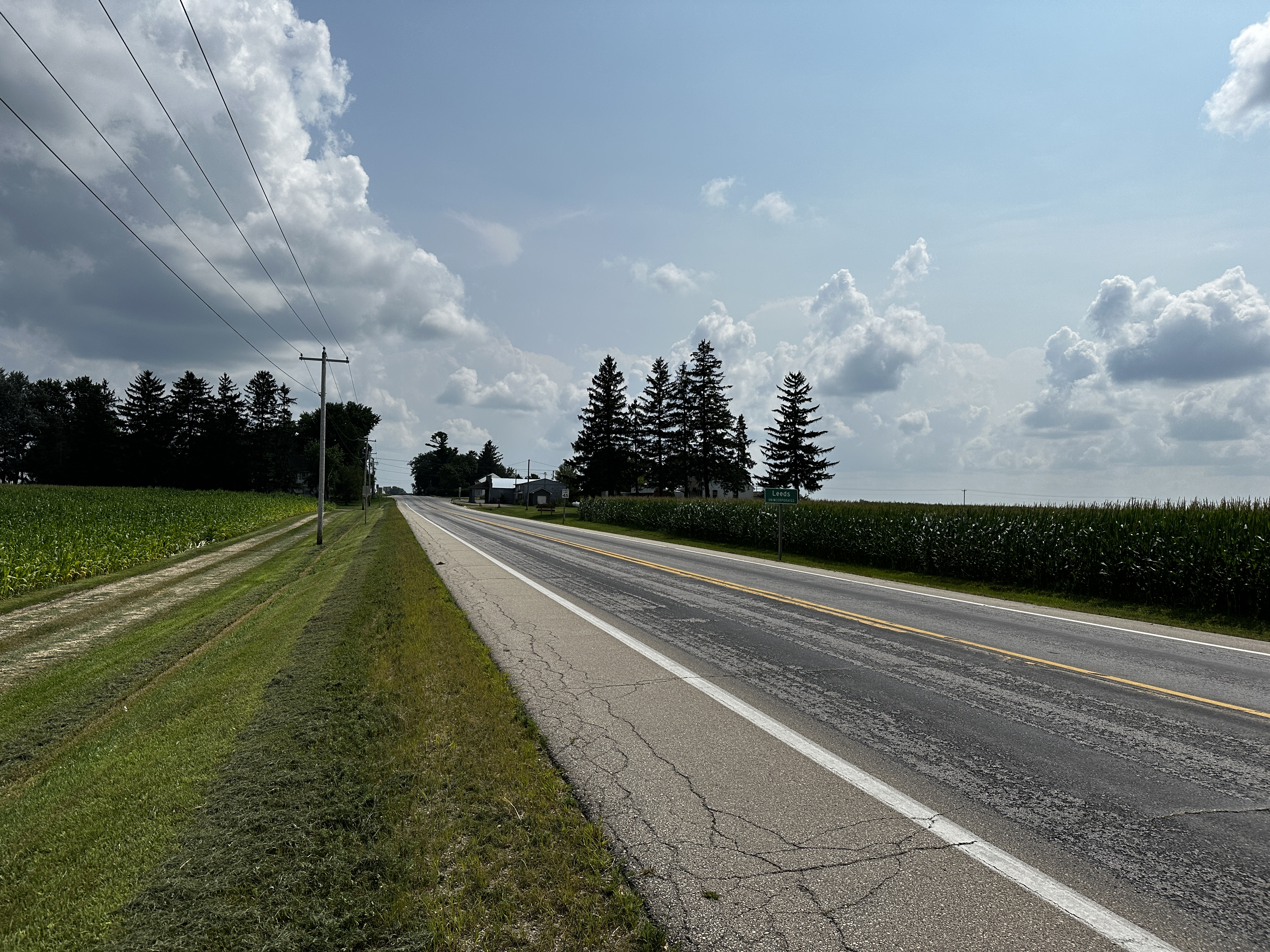
- Leeds pictured in July 2024

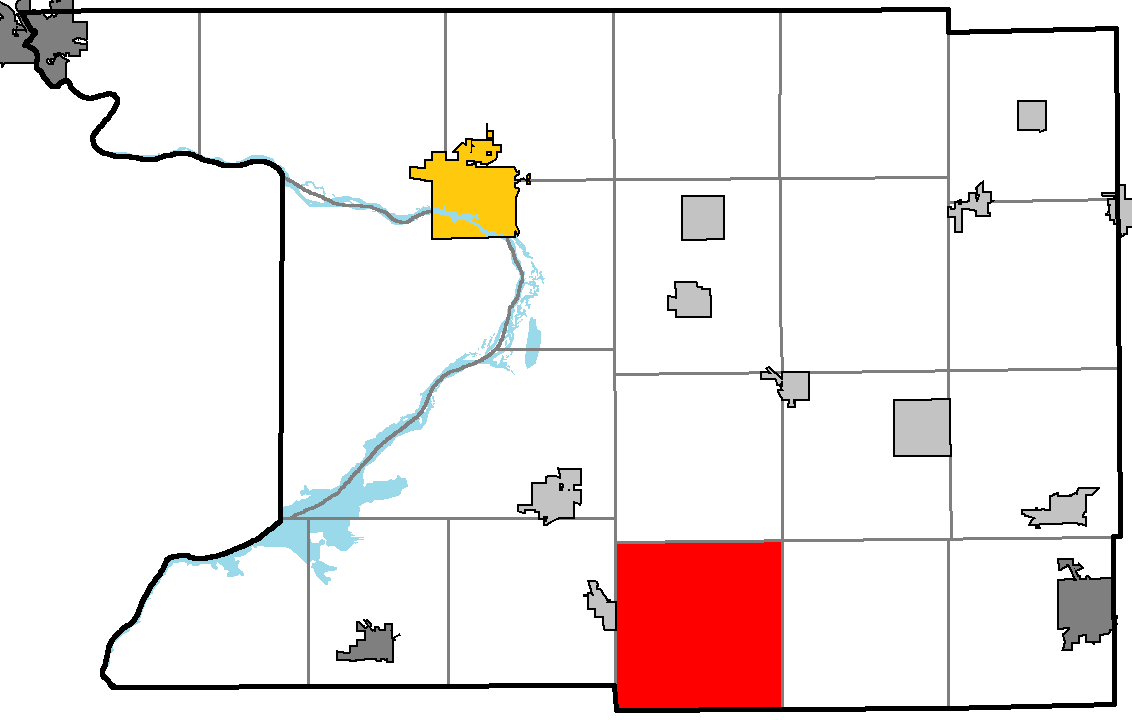
- Location of Leeds, within Columbia County, Wisconsin

- Location of Columbia County, Wisconsin
- Coordinates: 43°19′43″N 89°18′56″W
- Country: United States
- State: Wisconsin
- County: Columbia

Area
  - Total: 35.8 sq mi (92.7 km^{2})
  - Land: 36 sq mi (92 km^{2})
  - Water: 0.27 sq mi (0.7 km^{2})
- Elevation: 1,063 ft (324 m)

Population (2020)
  - Total: 755
  - Density: 21/sq mi (8.2/km^{2})
- Time zone: UTC-6 (Central (CST))
  - Summer (DST): UTC-5 (CDT)
- FIPS code: 55-43125
- GNIS feature ID: 1583538
- Website: https://townofleeds.wi.gov/

Leeds is a town in Columbia County, Wisconsin, United States. The population was 755 at the 2020 census. The unincorporated communities of Keyeser, Leeds, Leeds Center, and North Leeds are located in the town. The town took its name from the city of Leeds, England.

== Geography ==
According to the United States Census Bureau, the town has a total area of 35.8 square miles (92.7 km^{2}), of which 35.5 square miles (92 km^{2}) is land and 0.3 square mile (0.7 km^{2}) (0.78%) is water.

US 51 runs north and south through this unincorporated town.

== Demographics ==
As of the census of 2000, there were 813 people, 309 households, and 238 families residing in the town. The population density was 22.9 people per square mile (8.8/km^{2}). There were 317 housing units at an average density of 8.9 per square mile (3.4/km^{2}). The racial makeup of the town was 98.4% White, 0.12% Native American, 1.11% from other races, and 0.37% from two or more races. Hispanic or Latino people of any race were 1.85% of the population.

There were 309 households, out of which 32.7% had children under the age of 18 living with them, 66% were married couples living together, 5.2% had a female householder with no husband present, and 22.7% were non-families. 18.8% of all households were made up of individuals, and 7.4% had someone living alone who was 65 years of age or older. The average household size was 2.63 and the average family size was 2.98.

In the town, the population was spread out, with 24.7% under the age of 18, 6.2% from 18 to 24, 31.2% from 25 to 44, 24.6% from 45 to 64, and 13.3% who were 65 years of age or older. The median age was 40 years. For every 100 females, there were 111.2 males. For every 100 females age 18 and over, there were 107.5 males.

The median income for a household in the town was $51,750, and the median income for a family was $56,719. Males had a median income of $34,808 versus $30,000 for females. The per capita income for the town was $22,205. About 2.1% of families and 2.8% of the population were below the poverty line, including none of those under age 18 and 13.3% of those age 65 or over.

== Notable people ==
- W. R. Chipman, member of the Wisconsin State Assembly; born in and was Chairman of Leeds
- Julian F. Everett, architect; was born in Leeds
- Edward C. Meland, member of the Wisconsin State Assembly (1913–1914); born in Leeds
- Oscar Rennebohm, Governor of Wisconsin (1947–1951); born in Leeds
- Herbert C. Schenk, member of the Wisconsin State Assembly (1935–1940); born in Leeds
- George Wylie, member of the Wisconsin State Assembly (1897, 1899) and Wisconsin State Senate (1903–1904); lived in Leeds
