= Henry W. Hoffman =

American politician

Henry W. Hoffman (February 27, 1868 – April 23, 1963) was a politician from Wisconsin.

Hoffman was born in Stockbridge, Wisconsin. He was a member of the Wisconsin State Assembly during the 1915 session. Other positions he held include Town Treasurer and Town Clerk of Stockbridge. He was a Democrat. He died in Chilton, Wisconsin and was buried at Portland Cemetery.
