= William A. Schroeder =

American politician and lawyer

William A. Schroeder (December 21, 1889 – July 29, 1961) was an American politician and lawyer.

Schroeder was born in the town of Wauwatosa, Milwaukee County, Wisconsin. He went to the local public schools and graduated from Wauwatosa High School. Schroeder went to the University of Wisconsin and Marquette Law School, He was admitted to the Wisconsin bar and practiced law in Milwaukee, Wisconsin. He was also involved with the banking and real estate business. In 1914, Schroeder served as justice of the peace for the town of Wauwatosa and was a Republican. Schroeder served in the Wisconsin Assembly from 1915 to 1919. Schroeder died from a heart attack in a hospital in Milwaukee, Wisconsin.
