= Henry S. Berninger =

American businessman and politician

Henry S. Berninger (February 1, 1864 – May 18, 1934) was an American businessman and politician.

== Biography ==
Berninger's grave at Calvary Cemetery

Born in the town of Wauwatosa, Wisconsin, Berninger went to the Milwaukee parochial and public schools. He was a businessman. In 1889, Berninger served on the Wauwatosa Town Board and was a Republican. In 1915, Berninger served in the Wisconsin State Assembly. Berninger died of a heart attack at his home in Milwaukee, Wisconsin, and was buried at Calvary Cemetery.
