= A. J. Hedding =

American politician

A. J. Hedding (1883–1954) was a member of the Wisconsin State Assembly.

== Biography ==
Hedding was born in 1883. He died in 1954 and was buried in Port Washington, Wisconsin.

== Career ==
Hedding was first elected to the Assembly in 1912 to a seat previously held by W. J. Gilboy. Later, he became a judge in Milwaukee, Wisconsin.
