= Polar, Wisconsin =

- Town
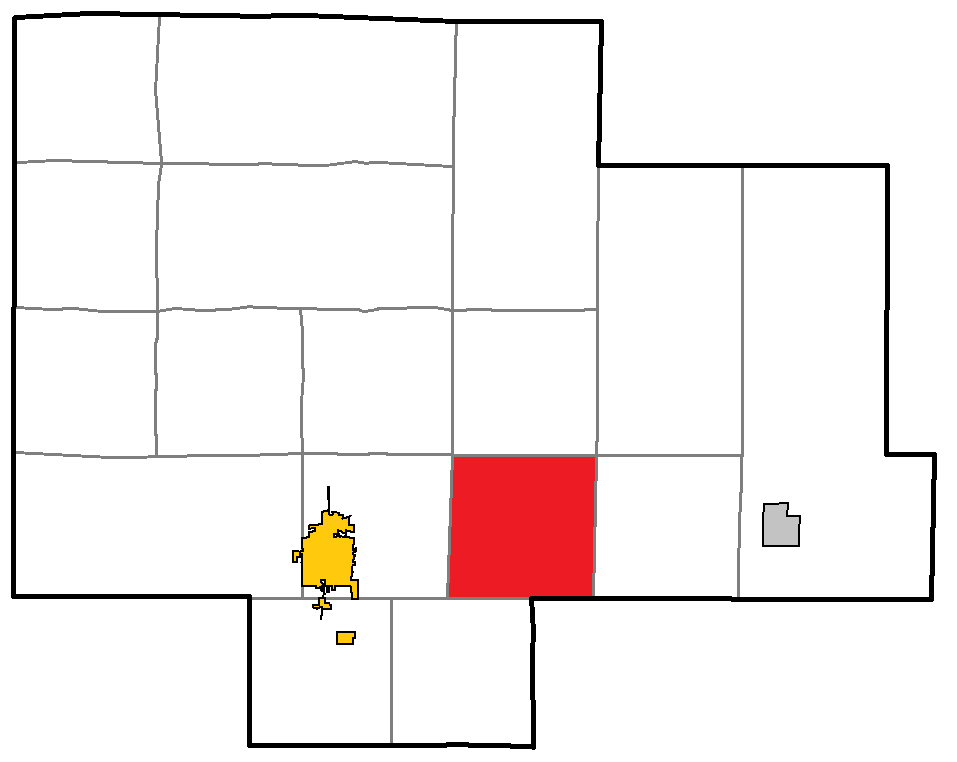
- Location of Polar, within Langlade County
- Coordinates: 45°9′54″N 89°0′3″W
- Country: United States
- State: Wisconsin
- County: Langlade

Area
  - Total: 35.97 sq mi (93.17 km^{2})
  - Land: 35.6 sq mi (92.2 km^{2})
  - Water: 0.37 sq mi (0.97 km^{2})
- Elevation: 1,499 ft (457 m)

Population (2020)
  - Total: 1,018
  - Density: 28.6/sq mi (11.0/km^{2})
- Time zone: UTC-6 (Central (CST))
  - Summer (DST): UTC-5 (CDT)
- ZIP Codes: 54409 (Antigo); 54418 (Bryant)
- Area codes: 715 & 534
- FIPS code: 55-067-63825
- GNIS feature ID: 1583949

Polar is a town in Langlade County, Wisconsin, United States. The population was 1,018 at the 2020 census. The town of Polar established a post office in 1882, until it was discontinued in 1887. In 1897, the town restored the post office, but it was eventually permanently discontinued in 1967.

Polar is named after Hi. B. Polar. The area was originally a trading post operated during the 1850s and 1860s along a military road, which ran along Hi Polar Lake. This post was a stopping off point for mail carriers traveling to and from Green Bay and Ontonagon, Michigan.

== Geography ==
The town of Polar is in southern Langlade County, partly bordered to the south by Menominee County. It is 9 miles (14 km) east of Antigo, the Langlade county seat.

According to the United States Census Bureau, the town has a total area of 36.0 square miles (93.2 km^{2}), of which 35.6 square miles (92.2 km^{2}) are land and 0.4 square miles (1 km^{2}), or 1.04%, are water.

== Demographics ==
As of the census of 2000, there were 995 people, 354 households, and 281 families residing in the town. The population density was 28 people per square mile (10.8/km^{2}). There were 383 housing units at an average density of 10.8 per square mile (4.2/km^{2}). The racial makeup of the town was 98.49% White, 0.1% African American, 0.4% Native American, 0.1% Asian, 0.2% from other races, and 0.7% from two or more races. Hispanic or Latino people of any race were 0.3% of the population.

There were 354 households, out of which 38.4% had children under the age of 18 living with them, 68.1% were married couples living together, 6.5% had a female householder with no husband present, and 20.6% were non-families. 17.8% of all households were made up of individuals, and 7.3% had someone living alone who was 65 years of age or older. The average household size was 2.81 and the average family size was 3.17.

In the town, the population was spread out, with 29.9% under the age of 18, 5.3% from 18 to 24, 29.9% from 25 to 44, 22.4% from 45 to 64, and 12.4% who were 65 years of age or older. The median age was 37 years. For every 100 females, there were 102.2 males. For every 100 females age 18 and over, there were 106.2 males.

The median income for a household in the town was $41,477, and the median income for a family was $48,083. Males had a median income of $31,625 versus $22,059 for females. The per capita income for the town was $17,141. About 3.7% of families and 7% of the population were below the poverty line, including 11% of those under age 18 and 6% of those age 65 or over.

== Notable people ==
- Edward Nordman, Wisconsin state representative and farmer, lived in the town
