= Edward Nordman =

American politician

Edward Nordman (October 24, 1864 – January 20, 1939) was an American politician and farmer.

Born in New London, Wisconsin, Nordman worked in construction and settled in Polar, Wisconsin. He taught school and farmed. He served as Langlade County, Wisconsin School Superintendent in 1888 and also served as superintendent of assessments. Nordman served on the Wisconsin Board of Agriculture from 1905 to 1910. Nordman was a strong supporter of Henry George's teachings. From 1913 to 1919, Nordman served in the Wisconsin State Assembly and was a Democrat. During his time in the Wisconsin Assembly, Nordman was one of four Democrats who refused to support the Wilcox Resolution condemning United States Senator Robert M. La Follette, Sr.'s attitude about World War I. Later in 1919, Nordman was a member of the Wisconsin State Council of Defense. In 1920, Nordman was appointed the first Wisconsin Agriculture Commissioner. In 1928, Nordman moved to La Feria, Texas, where he operated a fruit farm. He died in La Feria, Texas in 1939.
