= Hans M. Laursen =

American politician

Hans M. Laursen (December 23, 1865 – December 9, 1916) was an American businessman and politician.

Born in Denmark, Laursen emigrated with parents to the United States and went to Neenah, Wisconsin. They then moved to the town of Luck, Polk County, Wisconsin. Laursen stayed there until he was twenty-three. Laursen was president and general manager of Lakeside Lumber Company in Shell Lake, Wisconsin and also owned a farm. Laursen served as town clerk, justice of the peace, and on the Washburn County, Wisconsin Board of Supervisors. Laursen was also lumber inspector. Laursen was a Republican. From 1913 until his death in 1916, Laursen served in the Wisconsin State Assembly. Laursen was killed in a train accident one mile south of Spooner, Wisconsin, when the automobile he was driving was hit by a locomotive.
