= Wisconsin's Brown County 1st Assembly district =

Former American legislative district

Wisconsin's Brown County 1st State Assembly district
- Obsolete
- Notes: 1866–1871; 1876–1972

Wisconsin's Brown County 1st Assembly district was a district in the Wisconsin State Assembly for most of the history of the state of Wisconsin, up to the legislative redistricting reforms of 1972 which created the current numbered districts. Located in northeast Wisconsin, the district comprised parts of Brown County, Wisconsin, including all or part of the city of Green Bay.

The district was in use for Wisconsin elections from 1866 to 1871, and from 1876 to 1972.

== List of representatives ==
List of representatives from the Brown County 1st district
Member	Party	Residence	Term start	Term end	Leg.
District created
William J. Abrams	Dem.	Green Bay	January 7, 1867	January 6, 1868	20th
John B. Eugene	Rep.	Green Bay	January 6, 1868	January 4, 1869	21st
Joseph S. Curtis	Rep.	Green Bay	January 4, 1869	January 3, 1870	22nd
Edward Hicks	Dem.	Green Bay	January 3, 1870	January 2, 1871	23rd
Joseph S. Curtis	Rep.	Green Bay	January 2, 1871	January 1, 1872	24th
District abolished by 1871 Wisconsin Act 156; Brown, Door, and Kewaunee counties were organized into the Brown–Door–Kewaunee 1st, Brown–Door–Kewaunee 2nd, Brown–Door–Kewaunee 3rd, and Brown–Door–Kewaunee 4th Assembly districts
District re-established by 1876 Wisconsin Act 343
David M. Kelly	Rep.	Green Bay	January 1, 1877	January 5, 1880	30th 31st 32nd
Benjamin Fontaine	Rep.	Green Bay	January 5, 1880	January 2, 1882	33rd 34th
John M. Hogan	Rep.	Green Bay	January 2, 1882	January 1, 1883	35th
Philip M. Wirth	Dem.	Green Bay	January 1, 1883	January 5, 1885	36th
Enos Warren Persons	Dem.	De Pere	January 5, 1885	January 3, 1887	37th
Grégoire Dupont	Rep.	Green Bay	January 3, 1887	January 7, 1889	38th
Albert L. Gray	Dem.	Fort Howard	January 7, 1889	January 2, 1893	39th 40th
Henry F. Hagemeister	Dem.	Green Bay	January 2, 1893	January 4, 1897	41st 42nd
Thomas J. McGrath	Rep.	Green Bay	January 4, 1897	January 7, 1901	43rd 44th
Willard Burdeau	Rep.	Suamico	January 7, 1901	January 5, 1903	45th
William Finnegan	Rep.	Green Bay	January 5, 1903	January 2, 1905	46th
Willard Burdeau	Rep.	Suamico	January 2, 1905	January 7, 1907	47th
Timothy Burke	Rep.	Green Bay	January 7, 1907	January 4, 1909	48th
Ferdinand Wittig	Rep.	Green Bay	January 4, 1909	January 2, 1911	49th
E. A. Raymond	Rep.	Green Bay	January 2, 1911	January 6, 1913	50th
Archie McComb	Rep.	Green Bay	January 6, 1913	January 4, 1915	51st
Nicholas Feldhausen	Dem.	Green Bay	January 4, 1915	January 6, 1919	52nd 53rd
Thomas A. Delaney	Dem.	Green Bay	January 6, 1919	January 3, 1921	54th
James T. Oliver	Rep.	Green Bay	January 3, 1921	January 5, 1925	55th 56th
Malcolm A. Sellers	Rep.	Green Bay	January 5, 1925	January 7, 1929	57th 58th
Harold C. Malchow	Rep.	Green Bay	January 7, 1929	January 2, 1933	59th 60th
Robert E. Lynch	Dem.	Green Bay	January 2, 1933	January 4, 1937	61st 62nd
Harold A. Lytie	Dem.	Green Bay	January 4, 1937	January 4, 1943	63rd 64th 65th
Robert E. Lynch	Dem.	Green Bay	January 4, 1943	January 3, 1955	66th 67th 68th 69th 70th 71st
Jerome Quinn	Rep.	Green Bay	January 3, 1955	January 1, 1973	72nd 73rd 74th 75th 76th 77th 78th 79th 80th
District abolished by 1971 Wisconsin Act 304; Brown County was divided between the 1st, 3rd, 4th, 5th, 89th, and 90th Assembly districts The Brown County 1st district was roughly replaced by the 90th Assembly district
