= Dilweg =

Dilweg is a surname. Notable people with the surname include:

- Anthony Dilweg (born 1965), American football player
- Eleanor Coleman Dilweg (1905–1978), American Olympic swimmer
- Gary T. Dilweg, (born 1937), American politician, teacher, and businessman
- Lavern Dilweg (1903–1968), American lawyer, football player, and politician
