= Wisconsin's 2nd Senate district =

State senate district in Wisconsin, US

Wisconsin's 2nd State Senate district
- 2024 map defined in 2023 Wisc. Act 94; 2022 map defined in Johnson v. Wisconsin Elections Commission; 2011 map was defined in 2011 Wisc. Act 43 composed of Assembly districts 4, 5, and 6
Senator
Eric Wimberger; R–Oconto
since January 6, 2025 (1 year, 75 days)
- Demographics: 87.74% White; 0.86% Black; 2.27% Hispanic; 1.24% Asian; 7.52% Native American; 0.07% Hawaiian/Pacific Islander
- Population (2020) • Voting age: 178,360; 137,053
- Website: Official website
- Notes: Northeast Wisconsin

The 2nd Senate district of Wisconsin is one of 33 districts in the Wisconsin Senate. Located in northeast Wisconsin, the district comprises all of Menominee County along with the southern half of Oconto County, the eastern half of Shawano County, and much of eastern Outagamie County and northwest Brown County. It includes the cities of Oconto, Oconto Falls, Clintonville, and Shawano, and the villages of Bonduel, Howard, Little Chute, Seymour, and Suamico, along with parts of the cities of Green Bay, Appleton, and Kaukauna. The district also contains the entirety of the Oneida and Menominee Indian reservations.

== Current elected officials ==
Eric Wimberger is the senator representing the 2nd district. He was first elected in 2020 in the 30th Senate district, but ran for election in the 2nd district after the 2024 redistricting.

Each Wisconsin State Senate district is composed of three Wisconsin State Assembly districts. The 2nd Senate district comprises the 4th, 5th, and 6th Assembly districts. The current representatives of those districts are:

- Assembly District 4: David Steffen (R–Howard)
- Assembly District 5: Joy Goeben (R–Hobart)
- Assembly District 6: Elijah Behnke (R–Chase)

The district is located within Wisconsin's 8th congressional district, which is represented by U.S. Representative Tony Wied.

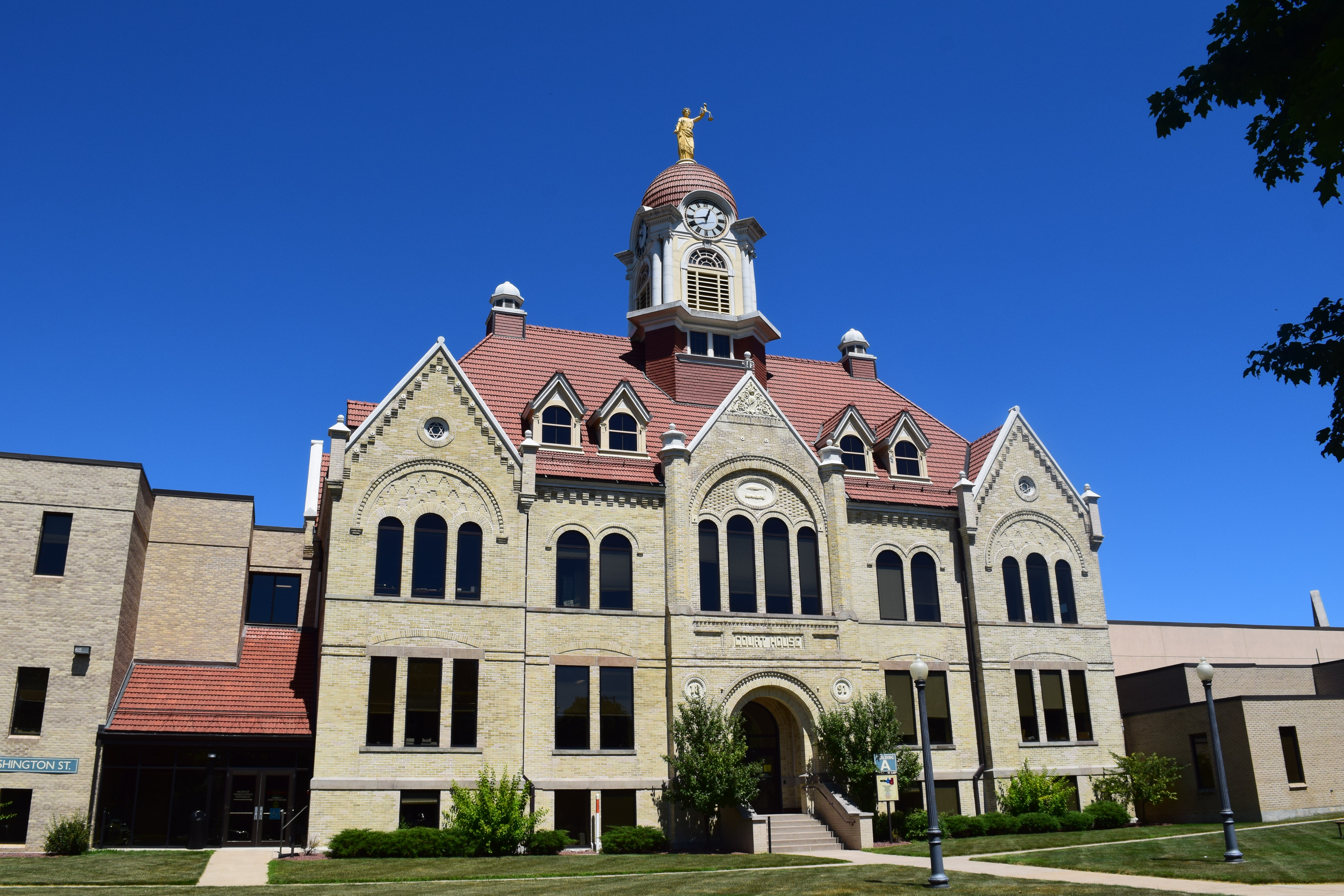
Oconto County courthouse in Oconto

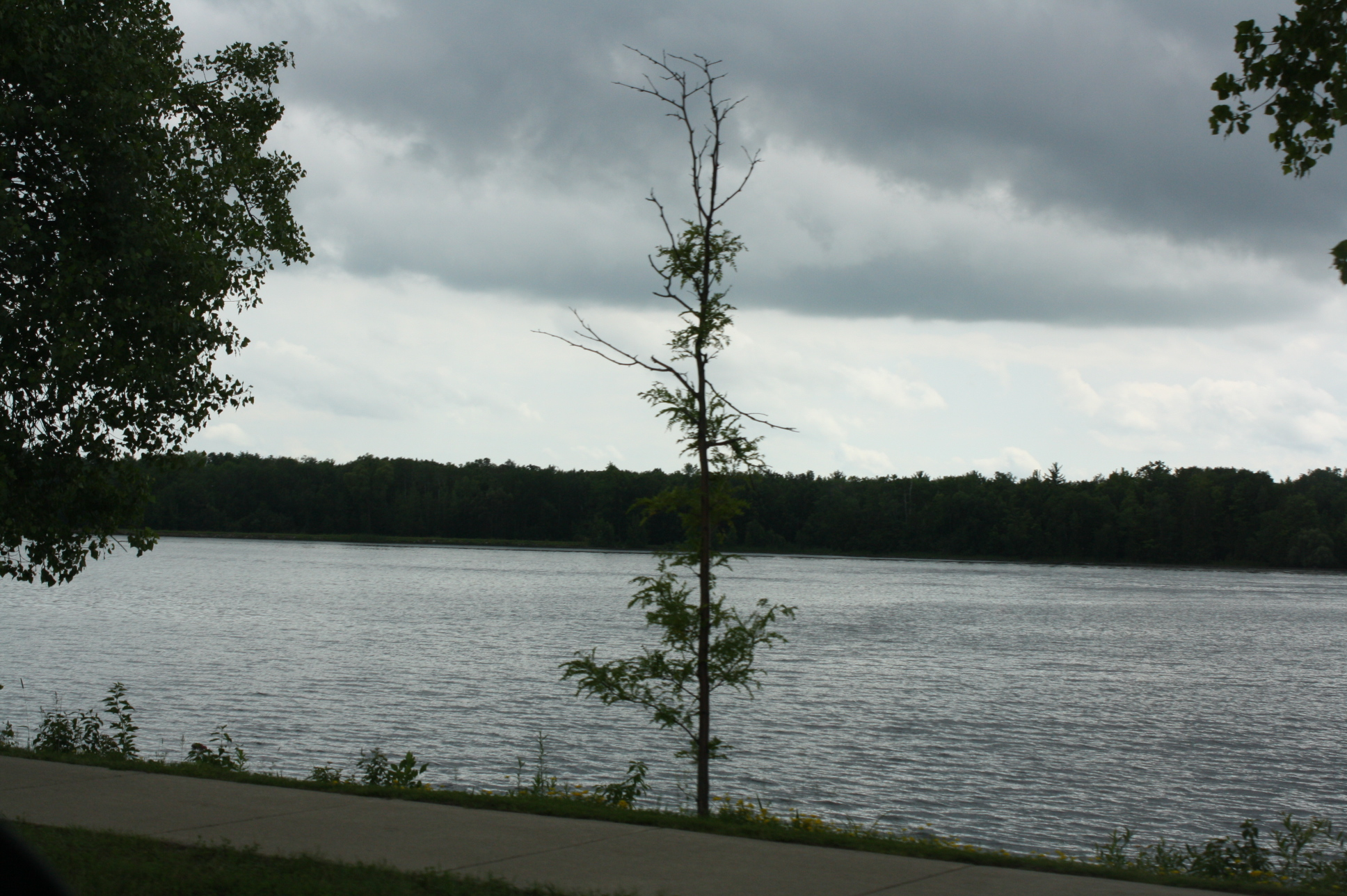
Oconto River in Oconto Falls

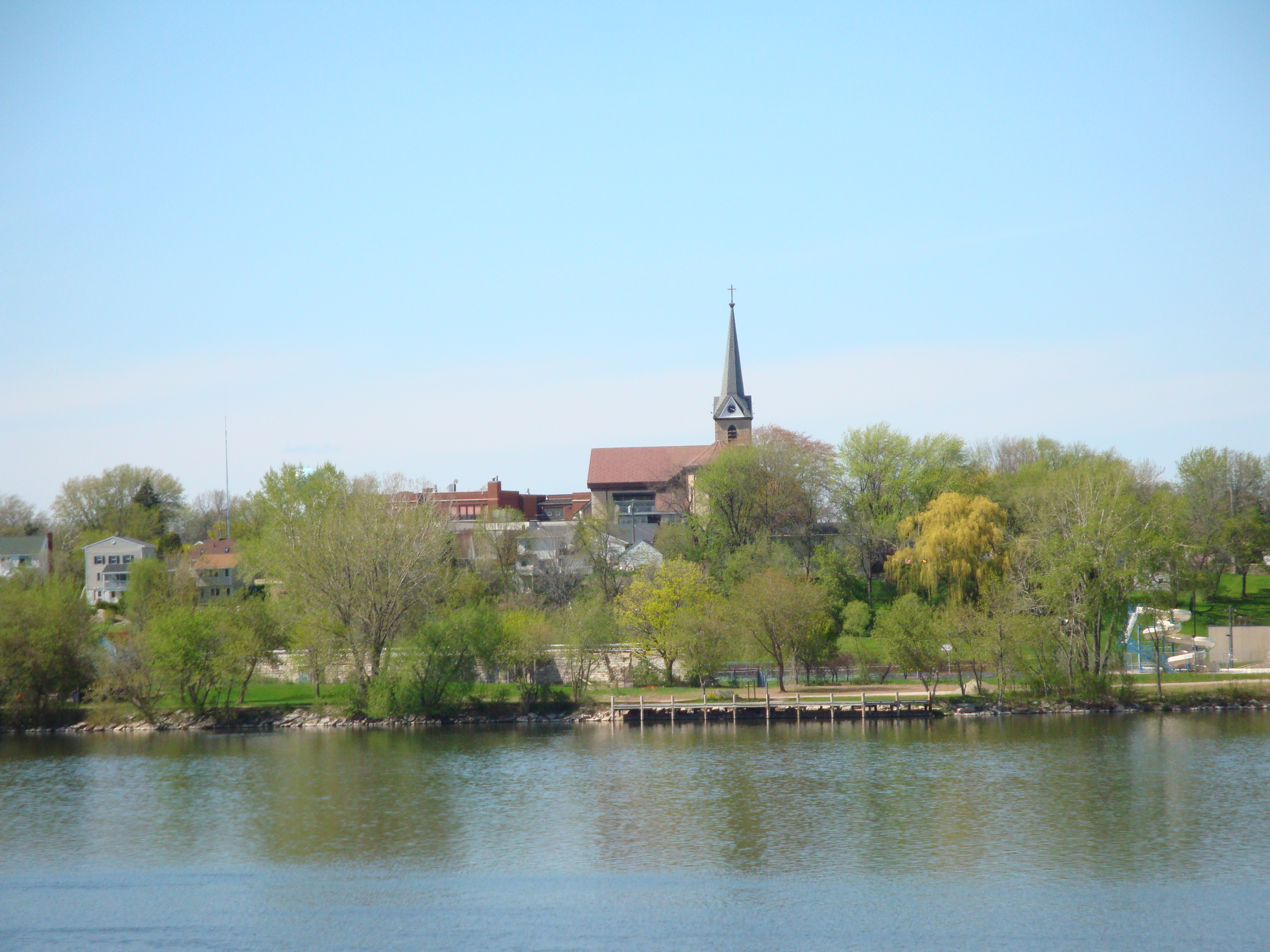
St. John Catholic Church and Island Park in Little Chute

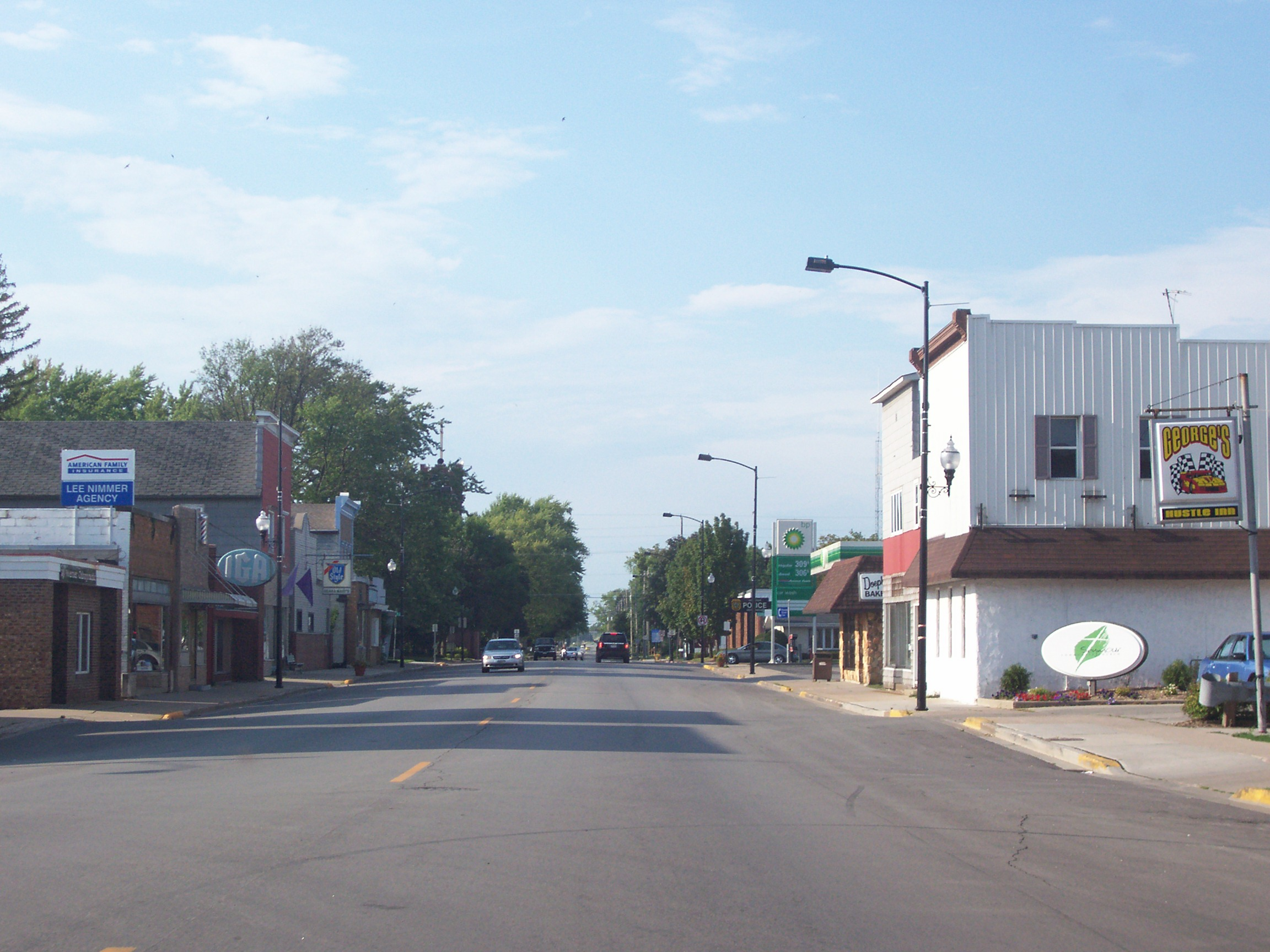
Seymour, Wisconsin

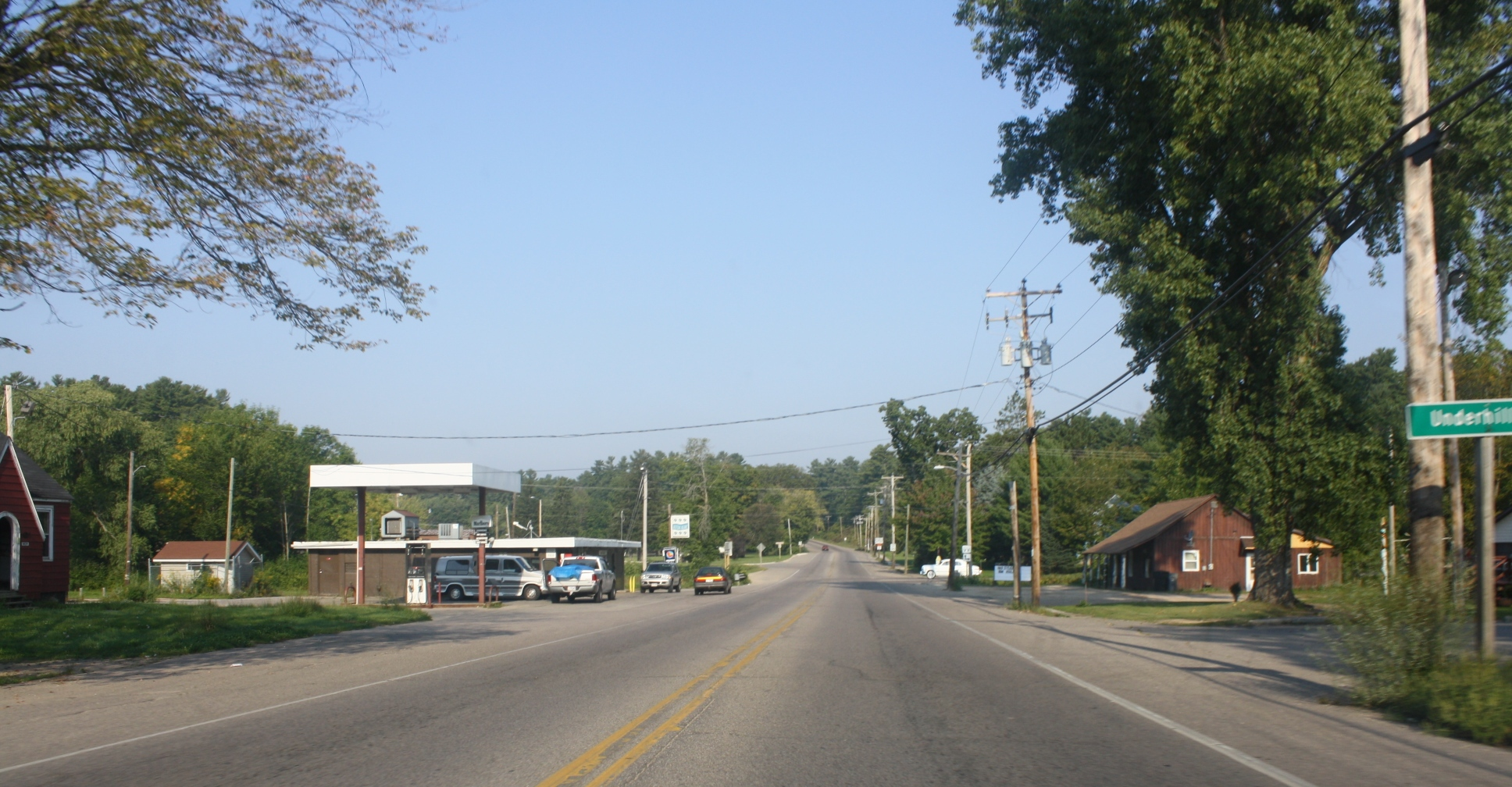
Keshena, in the Menominee Indian Reservation

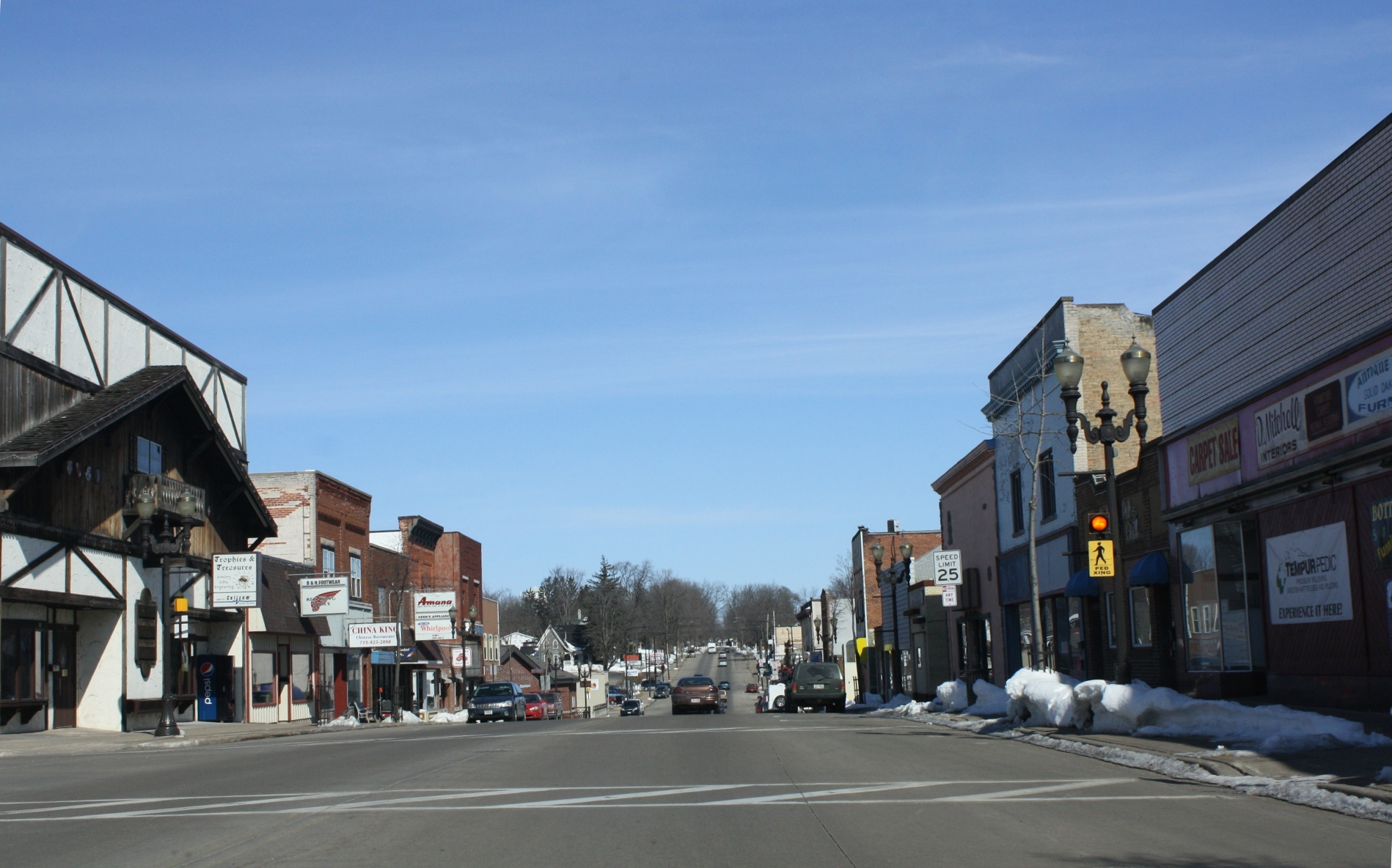
Downtown Clintonville

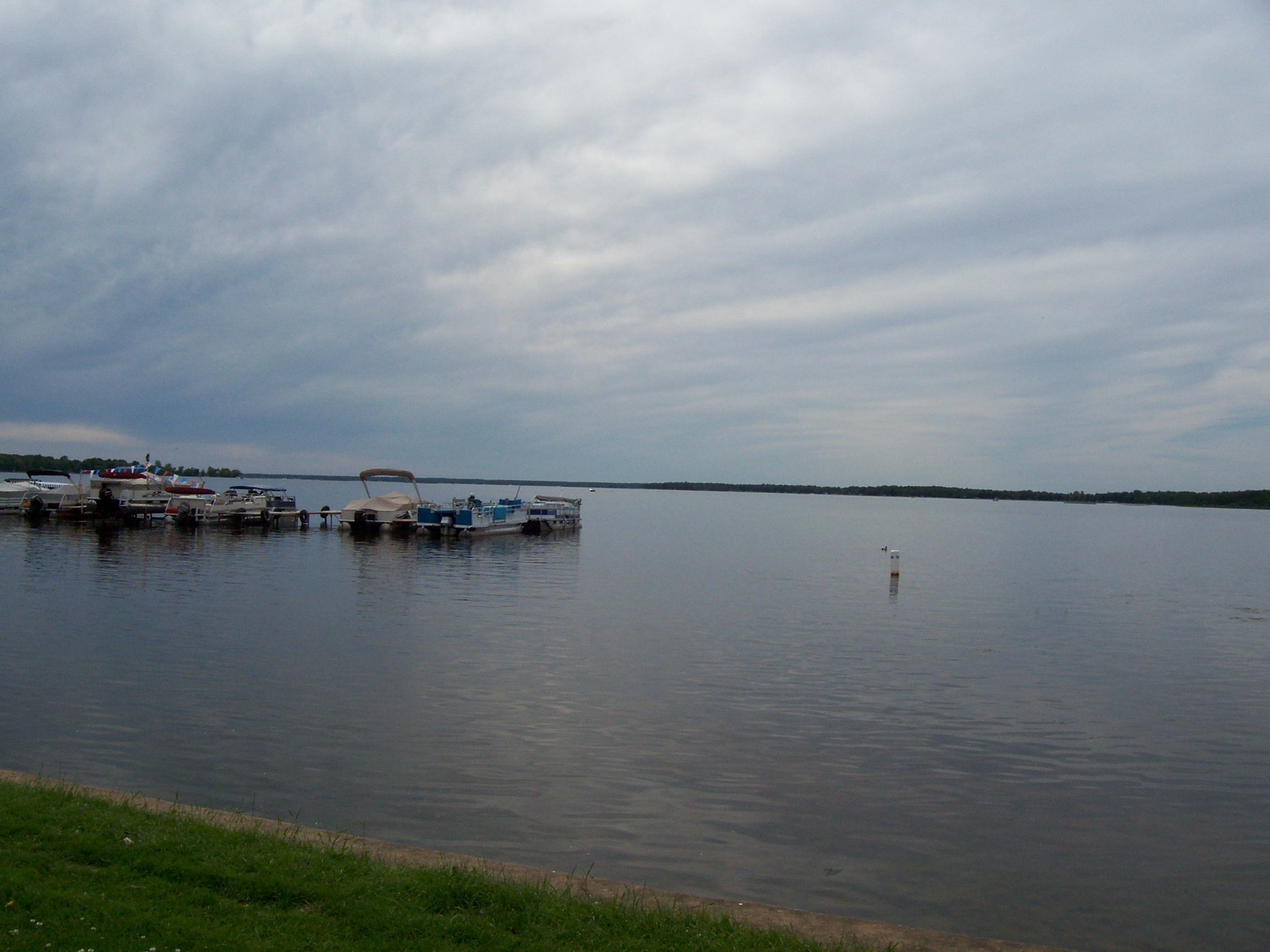
Shawano Lake

== Past senators ==
Note: the boundaries of districts have changed over history. Previous politicians of a specific numbered district have represented a completely different geographic area, due to redistricting.

The district has previously been represented by:

Senator	Party	Notes	Session	Years	District Definition
District created				1848	Columbia, Marquette, Portage, and Sauk counties
Henry Merrill	Whig		1st	1848	Columbia, Marquette, Portage, and Sauk counties
Henry Merrill	Whig		2nd	1849	Columbia, Marquette, Portage, and Sauk counties
George DeGraw Moore	Whig		3rd	1850	Columbia, Marquette, Portage, and Sauk counties
George DeGraw Moore	Whig		4th	1851	Columbia, Marquette, Portage, and Sauk counties
James S. Alban	Whig		5th	1852	Columbia, Marquette, Portage, and Sauk counties
James S. Alban	Whig		6th	1853	Brown, Door, Outagamie, Oconto, Waupaca, Marathon, and Portage counties
Joseph F. Loy	Dem.		7th	1854	Brown, Door, Outagamie, Oconto, Waupaca, Marathon, and Portage counties
Joseph F. Loy	Dem.		8th	1855	Brown, Door, Outagamie, Oconto, Waupaca, Marathon, and Portage counties
Perry H. Smith	Dem.		9th	1856	Brown, Door, Outagamie, Oconto, Waupaca, Marathon, and Portage counties
Perry H. Smith	Dem.		10th	1857	Brown, Door, Kewaunee, Oconto, Outagamie, and Shawano counties
Morgan Lewis Martin	Dem.		11th	1858	Brown, Door, Kewaunee, Oconto, Outagamie, and Shawano counties
Morgan Lewis Martin	Dem.		12th	1859	Brown, Door, Kewaunee, Oconto, Outagamie, and Shawano counties
Edward Decker	Dem.		13th	1860	Brown, Door, Kewaunee, Oconto, Outagamie, and Shawano counties
Edward Decker	Dem.		14th	1861	Brown, Door, Kewaunee, Oconto, Outagamie, and Shawano counties
Edward Hicks	Dem.		15th	1862	Brown and Kewaunee counties
Edward Hicks	Dem.		16th	1863	Brown and Kewaunee counties
Frederick S. Ellis	Dem.		17th	1864	Brown and Kewaunee counties
Frederick S. Ellis	Dem.		18th	1865	Brown and Kewaunee counties
Matthew J. Meade	Dem.		19th	1866	Brown and Kewaunee counties
Matthew J. Meade	Dem.		20th	1867	1866–1871 1871–1875; Brown, Door, and Kewaunee counties
William J. Abrams	Dem.		21st	1868	1866–1871 1871–1875; Brown, Door, and Kewaunee counties
William J. Abrams	Dem.		22nd	1869	1866–1871 1871–1875; Brown, Door, and Kewaunee counties
Lyman Walker	Dem.		23rd	1870	1866–1871 1871–1875; Brown, Door, and Kewaunee counties
Lyman Walker	Dem.		24th	1871	1866–1871 1871–1875; Brown, Door, and Kewaunee counties
Myron P. Lindsley	Dem.		25th	1872	1866–1871 1871–1875; Brown, Door, and Kewaunee counties
Myron P. Lindsley	Dem.		26th	1873	1866–1871 1871–1875; Brown, Door, and Kewaunee counties
John Milton Read	Dem.		27th	1874	1866–1871 1871–1875; Brown, Door, and Kewaunee counties
John Milton Read	Dem.		28th	1875	1866–1871 1871–1875; Brown, Door, and Kewaunee counties
Thomas R. Hudd	Dem.		29th	1876	1866–1871 1871–1875; Brown, Door, and Kewaunee counties
Thomas R. Hudd	Dem.		30th	1877	1876–1881 1882–1887; Brown County
Thomas R. Hudd	Dem.		31st	1878	1876–1881 1882–1887; Brown County
Thomas R. Hudd	Dem.		32nd	1879	1876–1881 1882–1887; Brown County
David M. Kelly	Rep.		33rd	1880	1876–1881 1882–1887; Brown County
David M. Kelly	Rep.		34th	1881	1876–1881 1882–1887; Brown County
Thomas R. Hudd	Dem.	Resigned after election to U.S. House in 1886 special election.	35th	1882	1876–1881 1882–1887; Brown County
Thomas R. Hudd	Dem.	Resigned after election to U.S. House in 1886 special election.	36th	1883–1884	1876–1881 1882–1887; Brown County
Thomas R. Hudd	Dem.	Resigned after election to U.S. House in 1886 special election.	37th	1885–1886	1876–1881 1882–1887; Brown County
--Vacant--			37th	1885–1886	1876–1881 1882–1887; Brown County
Charles W. Day	Rep.		38th	1887–1888	1876–1881 1882–1887; Brown County
Enos Warren Persons	Dem.		39th	1889–1890	Brown and Calumet counties
Enos Warren Persons	Dem.		40th	1891–1892	Brown and Calumet counties
Robert J. McGeehan	Dem.		41st	1893–1894	1892–1895 1896–1901 1902–1911 1912–1921 1922–1953; Brown and Oconto counties
Robert J. McGeehan	Dem.		42nd	1895–1896	1892–1895 1896–1901 1902–1911 1912–1921 1922–1953; Brown and Oconto counties
Andrew Caldwell Mailer	Rep.		43rd	1897–1898	1892–1895 1896–1901 1902–1911 1912–1921 1922–1953; Brown and Oconto counties
Andrew Caldwell Mailer	Rep.		44th	1899–1900	1892–1895 1896–1901 1902–1911 1912–1921 1922–1953; Brown and Oconto counties
Henry F. Hagemeister	Rep.		45th	1901–1902	1892–1895 1896–1901 1902–1911 1912–1921 1922–1953; Brown and Oconto counties
Henry F. Hagemeister	Rep.		46th	1903–1904	1892–1895 1896–1901 1902–1911 1912–1921 1922–1953; Brown and Oconto counties
Henry F. Hagemeister	Rep.		47th	1905–1906	1892–1895 1896–1901 1902–1911 1912–1921 1922–1953; Brown and Oconto counties
Henry F. Hagemeister	Rep.		48th	1907–1908	1892–1895 1896–1901 1902–1911 1912–1921 1922–1953; Brown and Oconto counties
Timothy Burke	Rep.		49th	1909–1910	1892–1895 1896–1901 1902–1911 1912–1921 1922–1953; Brown and Oconto counties
Timothy Burke	Rep.		50th	1911–1912	1892–1895 1896–1901 1902–1911 1912–1921 1922–1953; Brown and Oconto counties
Timothy Burke	Rep.		51st	1913–1914	1892–1895 1896–1901 1902–1911 1912–1921 1922–1953; Brown and Oconto counties
Timothy Burke	Rep.		52nd	1915–1916	1892–1895 1896–1901 1902–1911 1912–1921 1922–1953; Brown and Oconto counties
Timothy Burke	Rep.		53rd	1917–1918	1892–1895 1896–1901 1902–1911 1912–1921 1922–1953; Brown and Oconto counties
Timothy Burke	Rep.		54th	1919–1920	1892–1895 1896–1901 1902–1911 1912–1921 1922–1953; Brown and Oconto counties
Timothy Burke	Rep.		55th	1921–1922	1892–1895 1896–1901 1902–1911 1912–1921 1922–1953; Brown and Oconto counties
Timothy Burke	Rep.		56th	1923–1924	1892–1895 1896–1901 1902–1911 1912–1921 1922–1953; Brown and Oconto counties
John B. Chase	Rep.		57th	1925–1926	1892–1895 1896–1901 1902–1911 1912–1921 1922–1953; Brown and Oconto counties
John B. Chase	Rep.		58th	1927–1928	1892–1895 1896–1901 1902–1911 1912–1921 1922–1953; Brown and Oconto counties
Elmer Hall	Rep.	Previously elected Wisconsin Secretary of State.	59th	1929–1930	1892–1895 1896–1901 1902–1911 1912–1921 1922–1953; Brown and Oconto counties
Elmer Hall	Rep.	Previously elected Wisconsin Secretary of State.	60th	1931–1932	1892–1895 1896–1901 1902–1911 1912–1921 1922–1953; Brown and Oconto counties
E. F. Brunette	Dem.		61st	1933–1934	1892–1895 1896–1901 1902–1911 1912–1921 1922–1953; Brown and Oconto counties
E. F. Brunette	Dem.		62nd	1935–1936	1892–1895 1896–1901 1902–1911 1912–1921 1922–1953; Brown and Oconto counties
Michael F. Kresky Jr.	Prog.		63rd	1937–1938	1892–1895 1896–1901 1902–1911 1912–1921 1922–1953; Brown and Oconto counties
Michael F. Kresky Jr.	Prog.		64th	1939–1940	1892–1895 1896–1901 1902–1911 1912–1921 1922–1953; Brown and Oconto counties
John W. Byrnes	Rep.	Elected to U.S. House in 1944.	65th	1941–1942	1892–1895 1896–1901 1902–1911 1912–1921 1922–1953; Brown and Oconto counties
John W. Byrnes	Rep.	Elected to U.S. House in 1944.	66th	1943–1944	1892–1895 1896–1901 1902–1911 1912–1921 1922–1953; Brown and Oconto counties
Harold A. Lytie	Dem.		67th	1945–1946	1892–1895 1896–1901 1902–1911 1912–1921 1922–1953; Brown and Oconto counties
Harold A. Lytie	Dem.		68th	1947–1948	1892–1895 1896–1901 1902–1911 1912–1921 1922–1953; Brown and Oconto counties
Fred F. Kaftan	Rep.		69th	1949–1950	1892–1895 1896–1901 1902–1911 1912–1921 1922–1953; Brown and Oconto counties
Fred F. Kaftan	Rep.		70th	1951–1952	1892–1895 1896–1901 1902–1911 1912–1921 1922–1953; Brown and Oconto counties
Leo P. O'Brien	Rep.		71st	1953–1954	1892–1895 1896–1901 1902–1911 1912–1921 1922–1953; Brown and Oconto counties
Leo P. O'Brien	Rep.		72nd	1955–1956	Brown County
Leo P. O'Brien	Rep.		73rd	1957–1958	Brown County
Leo P. O'Brien	Rep.		74th	1959–1960	Brown County
Leo P. O'Brien	Rep.		75th	1961–1962	Brown County
Leo P. O'Brien	Rep.		76th	1963–1964	Brown County
Robert W. Warren	Rep.		77th	1965–1966	Calumet County, parts of Brown County: Town of Allouez, Wisconsin, Allouez; Town of Bellevue; Town of De Pere; Town of Eaton; Town of Glenmore; Town of Green Bay; Town of Holland; Town of Humboldt; Town of Morrison; Town of New Denmark; Town of Rockland; Town of Wrightstown; Village of Denmark; Village of Wrightstown; City of De Pere; Wards 1-8, 10-15, 17-21, City of Green Bay
Robert W. Warren	Rep.		78th	1967–1968	Calumet County, parts of Brown County: Town of Allouez, Wisconsin, Allouez; Town of Bellevue; Town of De Pere; Town of Eaton; Town of Glenmore; Town of Green Bay; Town of Holland; Town of Humboldt; Town of Morrison; Town of New Denmark; Town of Rockland; Town of Wrightstown; Village of Denmark; Village of Wrightstown; City of De Pere; Wards 1-8, 10-15, 17-21, City of Green Bay
Myron P. Lotto	Rep.		79th	1969–1970	Calumet County, parts of Brown County: Town of Allouez, Wisconsin, Allouez; Town of Bellevue; Town of De Pere; Town of Eaton; Town of Glenmore; Town of Green Bay; Town of Holland; Town of Humboldt; Town of Morrison; Town of New Denmark; Town of Rockland; Town of Wrightstown; Village of Denmark; Village of Wrightstown; City of De Pere; Wards 1-8, 10-15, 17-21, City of Green Bay
Myron P. Lotto	Rep.		80th	1971–1972	Calumet County, parts of Brown County: Town of Allouez, Wisconsin, Allouez; Town of Bellevue; Town of De Pere; Town of Eaton; Town of Glenmore; Town of Green Bay; Town of Holland; Town of Humboldt; Town of Morrison; Town of New Denmark; Town of Rockland; Town of Wrightstown; Village of Denmark; Village of Wrightstown; City of De Pere; Wards 1-8, 10-15, 17-21, City of Green Bay
Tom Petri	Rep.	Resigned after election to U.S. House in 1979 special election.	81st	1973–1974	Calumet County, parts of Brown County: Town of Allouez, Wisconsin, Allouez; Town of Bellevue; Town of De Pere; Town of Lawrence; Town of Wrightstown; Village of Allouez; Village of Wrightstown; City of De Pere; Southern Wards, City of Green Bay; eastern of Fond du Lac County: Town of Auburn; Town of Calumet; Town of Eden; Town of Empire; Town of Forest; Town of Marshfield; Town of Osceola; Town of Taycheedah; Village of Campbellsport; Village of Eden; Village of Mount Calvary; Village of Saint Cloud; part of Outagamie County: Town of Kaukauna; Town of Buchanan; Village of Combined Locks; Village of Kimberly; Village of Little Chute; City of Kaukauna; part of Sheboygan County: Town of Greenbush; Town of Russell; part of Washington County: Town of Kewaskum; Village of Kewaskum
Tom Petri	Rep.	Resigned after election to U.S. House in 1979 special election.	82nd	1975–1976	
Tom Petri	Rep.	Resigned after election to U.S. House in 1979 special election.	83rd	1977–1978	
Tom Petri	Rep.	Resigned after election to U.S. House in 1979 special election.	84th	1979–1980	
Don Hanaway	Rep.	Won 1979 special election. Re-elected 1980, 1984. Elected Attorney General in 1986.	84th	1979–1980	
Don Hanaway	Rep.	Won 1979 special election. Re-elected 1980, 1984. Elected Attorney General in 1986.	85th	1981–1982	
Don Hanaway	Rep.	Won 1979 special election. Re-elected 1980, 1984. Elected Attorney General in 1986.	86th	1983–1984	Part of Brown, Calumet, Oconto, Outagamie, Shawano
Don Hanaway	Rep.	Won 1979 special election. Re-elected 1980, 1984. Elected Attorney General in 1986.	87th	1985–1986	Part of Brown, Oconto, Outagamie, Shawano
--Vacant--			88th	1987–1988	Part of Brown, Oconto, Outagamie, Shawano
Robert Cowles	Rep.	Won 1987 special election. Re-elected 1988, 1992, 1996, 2000, 2004, 2008. Survived 2011 recall election. Re-elected 2012, 2016, 2020.	88th	1987–1988	Part of Brown, Oconto, Outagamie, Shawano
Robert Cowles	Rep.	Won 1987 special election. Re-elected 1988, 1992, 1996, 2000, 2004, 2008. Survived 2011 recall election. Re-elected 2012, 2016, 2020.	89th	1989–1990	Part of Brown, Oconto, Outagamie, Shawano
Robert Cowles	Rep.	Won 1987 special election. Re-elected 1988, 1992, 1996, 2000, 2004, 2008. Survived 2011 recall election. Re-elected 2012, 2016, 2020.	90th	1991–1992	Part of Brown, Oconto, Outagamie, Shawano
Robert Cowles	Rep.	Won 1987 special election. Re-elected 1988, 1992, 1996, 2000, 2004, 2008. Survived 2011 recall election. Re-elected 2012, 2016, 2020.	91st	1993–1994	Part of Brown, Oconto, Outagamie, Shawano
Robert Cowles	Rep.	Won 1987 special election. Re-elected 1988, 1992, 1996, 2000, 2004, 2008. Survived 2011 recall election. Re-elected 2012, 2016, 2020.	92nd	1995–1996	Part of Brown, Oconto, Outagamie, Shawano
Robert Cowles	Rep.	Won 1987 special election. Re-elected 1988, 1992, 1996, 2000, 2004, 2008. Survived 2011 recall election. Re-elected 2012, 2016, 2020.	93rd	1997–1998	Part of Brown, Oconto, Outagamie, Shawano
Robert Cowles	Rep.	Won 1987 special election. Re-elected 1988, 1992, 1996, 2000, 2004, 2008. Survived 2011 recall election. Re-elected 2012, 2016, 2020.	94th	1999–2000	Part of Brown, Oconto, Outagamie, Shawano
Robert Cowles	Rep.	Won 1987 special election. Re-elected 1988, 1992, 1996, 2000, 2004, 2008. Survived 2011 recall election. Re-elected 2012, 2016, 2020.	95th	2001–2002	Part of Brown, Oconto, Outagamie, Shawano
Robert Cowles	Rep.	Won 1987 special election. Re-elected 1988, 1992, 1996, 2000, 2004, 2008. Survived 2011 recall election. Re-elected 2012, 2016, 2020.	96th	2003–2004	Part of Brown, Oconto, Outagamie, Shawano
Robert Cowles	Rep.	Won 1987 special election. Re-elected 1988, 1992, 1996, 2000, 2004, 2008. Survived 2011 recall election. Re-elected 2012, 2016, 2020.	97th	2005–2006	Part of Brown, Oconto, Outagamie, Shawano
Robert Cowles	Rep.	Won 1987 special election. Re-elected 1988, 1992, 1996, 2000, 2004, 2008. Survived 2011 recall election. Re-elected 2012, 2016, 2020.	98th	2007–2008	Part of Brown, Oconto, Outagamie, Shawano
Robert Cowles	Rep.	Won 1987 special election. Re-elected 1988, 1992, 1996, 2000, 2004, 2008. Survived 2011 recall election. Re-elected 2012, 2016, 2020.	99th	2009–2010	Part of Brown, Oconto, Outagamie, Shawano
Robert Cowles	Rep.	Won 1987 special election. Re-elected 1988, 1992, 1996, 2000, 2004, 2008. Survived 2011 recall election. Re-elected 2012, 2016, 2020.	100th	2011–2012	Part of Brown, Oconto, Outagamie, Shawano
Robert Cowles	Rep.	Won 1987 special election. Re-elected 1988, 1992, 1996, 2000, 2004, 2008. Survived 2011 recall election. Re-elected 2012, 2016, 2020.	101st	2013–2014	Part of Brown, Outagamie, Shawano, Waupaca
Robert Cowles	Rep.	Won 1987 special election. Re-elected 1988, 1992, 1996, 2000, 2004, 2008. Survived 2011 recall election. Re-elected 2012, 2016, 2020.	102nd	2015–2016	Part of Brown, Outagamie, Shawano, Waupaca
Robert Cowles	Rep.	Won 1987 special election. Re-elected 1988, 1992, 1996, 2000, 2004, 2008. Survived 2011 recall election. Re-elected 2012, 2016, 2020.	103rd	2017–2018	Part of Brown, Outagamie, Shawano, Waupaca
Robert Cowles	Rep.	Won 1987 special election. Re-elected 1988, 1992, 1996, 2000, 2004, 2008. Survived 2011 recall election. Re-elected 2012, 2016, 2020.	104th	2019–2020	Part of Brown, Outagamie, Shawano, Waupaca
Robert Cowles	Rep.	Won 1987 special election. Re-elected 1988, 1992, 1996, 2000, 2004, 2008. Survived 2011 recall election. Re-elected 2012, 2016, 2020.	105th	2021–2022	Part of Brown, Outagamie, Shawano, Waupaca
Robert Cowles	Rep.	Won 1987 special election. Re-elected 1988, 1992, 1996, 2000, 2004, 2008. Survived 2011 recall election. Re-elected 2012, 2016, 2020.	106th	2023–2024	Northwest Brown County; Most of Outagamie County; Most of Shawano County; Part of Wauapaca County
Eric Wimberger	Rep.	Elected 2024.	107th	2025–2026	

== See also ==
- Political subdivisions of Wisconsin
