= Constant Martin (politician) =

American politician (1830–1894)

Member of the Wisconsin State Assembly from the Kewaunee County district
- In office January 1, 1866 – January 7, 1867
- Preceded by: Lyman Walker
- Succeeded by: David Youngs (Door–Kewaunee)

Personal details
- Born: May 11, 1830 Province of Brabant, Netherlands
- Died: June 16, 1894 (aged 64) Green Bay, Wisconsin, U.S.
- Resting place: Woodlawn Cemetery, Green Bay
- Party: Democratic Party
- Spouses: Fannie Gillion (m. 1853; died 1870); Mary Louisa Rosenberg (m. 1870–1894)
- Children: Clotilde Martin^{(b. 1856; died 1870)}; Joseph Martin^{(b. 1869; died 1870)}; George B. Martin^{(died 1873)}

Constant Martin (May 11, 1830 – June 16, 1894) was a Belgian American immigrant, land speculator, and politician from northeast Wisconsin. He served one term in the Wisconsin State Assembly, representing Kewaunee County during the 1866 term. Later, he served as a deputy U.S. marshal in the Eastern District of Wisconsin. He also served in various local offices in Kewaunee County and Brown County, Wisconsin.

== Biography ==
Martin was born on May 11, 1830, in the Province of Brabant, in Belgium. Belgium was then still part of the United Kingdom of the Netherlands, but transitioned to become the independent Kingdom of Belgium a few months after his birth. After working as a clerk during his young adult life, Martin immigrated to Philadelphia and started studying English. He married fellow Belgian immigrant Fannie Gillon there in 1853; the couple had their first child in 1855 or 1856. The family moved to Red River, Wisconsin, in 1859 and took up residence there.

During his time in Red River, Martin was a land dealer and insurance agent. In 1866, he was elected to a one-year term in the Wisconsin State Assembly. He was a Democrat in his political views. Martin was among the first Belgian-Americans from northeastern Wisconsin to make it to the Assembly; the group also included Joseph Wery, Benjamin Fontaine, John B. Eugene and Grégoire Dupont. Martin moved on from elected positions to become a government assessor in 1867, something that tied in well with Martin's previous experience as a prominent real estate dealer in northeastern Wisconsin.

1870 was a pivotal year in Martin's life; his wife had a second child but then perished along with both children later in the year. Also in that year, Martin married New York native Mary Louisa Rosenberg. In his professional life, Martin stepped into new roles as a deputy United States Marshall, postmaster of Red River and town chairman of Red River, a position he held for another four years. He was also a local justice for five years and superintendent of Kewaunee County schools for two years in the early 1870s.

In 1874, Martin moved to Green Bay, Wisconsin, and served on the school board from 1885 to 1892. He died on June 16, 1894, at age 64.

Wisconsin State Assembly
Preceded by Lyman Walker	Member of the Wisconsin State Assembly from the Kewaunee County district January 1, 1866 – January 7, 1867	Succeeded by David Youngs (Door–Kewaunee district)
