= Wisconsin's Brown–Door–Kewaunee 1st Assembly district =

Former American legislative district

Wisconsin's Brown–Door–Kewaunee 1st State Assembly district
- Obsolete
- Notes: 1872–1876

Wisconsin's Brown–Door–Kewaunee 1st Assembly district was a district in the Wisconsin State Assembly in the early years of the history of the state of Wisconsin, prior to the legislative redistricting reforms of 1972 which created the current numbered districts. Located in northeast Wisconsin, the district was part of a brief organization of four Assembly districts shared among Brown, Door, and Kewaunee counties; this district comprised part of Brown County, Wisconsin, including the city of Green Bay, Wisconsin.

The district was in use for elections from 1871 through 1875 (inclusive).

== List of representatives ==
List of representatives from the Brown–Door–Kewaunee 1st district
Member	Party	Residence	Term start	Term end	Leg.
District preceded by the Brown County 1st Assembly district District created by 1871 Wisconsin Act 156
Christian Wœlz	Dem.	Green Bay	January 1, 1872	January 6, 1873	25th
Joseph S. Curtis	Rep.	Green Bay	January 6, 1873	January 5, 1874	26th
Morgan Lewis Martin	Ref.	Green Bay	January 5, 1874	January 4, 1875	27th
Thomas R. Hudd	Ref.	Green Bay	January 4, 1875	January 3, 1876	28th
Mitchell Resch	Dem.	Green Bay	January 3, 1876	January 1, 1877	29th
District abolished by 1876 Wisconsin Act 343; Brown County was reorganized into the Brown 1st, Brown 2nd, and Brown 3rd Assembly districts Kewaunee County was consolidated as a single-county Assembly district Door County became a single-county Assembly district
