= John B. Eugene =

American politician (d. 1878)

Member of the Wisconsin State Assembly from the Brown 1st district
- In office January 6, 1868 – January 4, 1869
- Preceded by: William J. Abrams
- Succeeded by: Joseph S. Curtis

Personal details
- Born: Aische-en-Refail, Belgium
- Died: July 10, 1878 Green Bay, Wisconsin
- Resting place: Woodlawn Cemetery, Green Bay, Wisconsin
- Party: Republican

John B. Eugene (died July 10, 1878) was a Belgian-American politician. He served in the 1868 Wisconsin State Assembly, representing Brown County's First District.

== Biography ==
Eugene was born in Belgium and moved to northeast Wisconsin in 1855. He worked at a paper mill and lost an arm working. He later worked in Madison with the state Attorney General's office. During the American Civil War, Eugene was the quartermaster of the 43rd Wisconsin Infantry.

Eugene was elected to the Wisconsin State Assembly for the 1868 term, representing Brown County's 1st District. He defeated Democratic challenger Arthur Jacobi by a mere 17 votes, 517-500. Eugene was one of the first Belgian-American immigrants from northeastern Wisconsin to serve in the Assembly along with Joseph Wery, Constant Martin, Benjamin Fontaine and Grégoire Dupont.

After serving in the Assembly, Eugene was elected Clerk of Brown County in the fall of 1868. He also later served as a revenue collector, and was a member of the Wisconsin Board of Immigration. During the mid-1870s, Eugene served as a doorkeeper for the United States Congress.

Eugene died in Green Bay, Wisconsin, on July 10, 1878; reports conflict on whether it was due to heart disease or apoplexy.
