= Joseph S. Curtis =

19th century American politician

Member of the Wisconsin State Assembly
- In office January 6, 1873 – January 5, 1874
- Preceded by: Christian Wœlz
- Succeeded by: Morgan Lewis Martin
- Constituency: Brown–Door–Kewaunee 1st district
- In office January 2, 1871 – January 1, 1872
- Preceded by: Edward Hicks
- Succeeded by: District abolished
- Constituency: Brown 1st district
- In office January 4, 1869 – January 3, 1870
- Preceded by: John B. Eugene
- Succeeded by: Edward Hicks
- Constituency: Brown 1st district

Personal details
- Born: June 8, 1831 Warren, Ohio, U.S.
- Died: May 15, 1878 (aged 46) Green Bay, Wisconsin, U.S.
- Resting place: Woodlawn Cemetery, Green Bay
- Party: Republican
- Spouse: Rosalind Rider (m. 1867–1878)
- Children: 4
- Education: Williams College
- Occupation: Lawyer

Military service
- Allegiance: United States
- Branch/service: United States Volunteers; Union Army
- Years of service: 1862–1865
- Rank: 2nd Lieutenant, USV
- Unit: 12th Reg. Wis. Vol. Infantry; 42nd Reg. Wis. Vol. Infantry
- Battles/wars: American Civil War: Vicksburg campaign; Atlanta campaign

Joseph Seaver Curtis (June 8, 1831 – May 15, 1878) was an American lawyer, Republican politician, and Wisconsin pioneer. He was a member of the Wisconsin State Assembly for three terms, representing Green Bay and eastern Brown County during the 1869, 1871, and 1873 sessions. He was also an editor of the Green Bay Gazette, and an officer in the Union Army during the American Civil War.

== Early life ==
Joseph Seaver Curtis was born in Warren, Ohio, in June 1831. His mother died when he was just a year old. His father moved the family back east to Vermont, where Joseph was raised and educated. He graduated from Williams College, in Massachusetts, in 1852. He came out of college in poor health and sought revitalization in the west. He moved to Green Bay, Wisconsin, where his uncle, Reverend Jeremiah Porter, was established and lived as a member of Porter's household for several years. When the Porters left Wisconsin, in 1858, Curtis elected to stay and make it his permanent home.

In these early years in Green Bay, he served in several local offices, including justice of the peace, city clerk, and deputy clerk of the court. He chose to study law and moved temporarily to Madison, Wisconsin, to utilize the library there.

== Civil War service ==
While he was living in Madison, the country entered the American Civil War. He joined up with a company of Green Bay volunteers who had come to Madison to become organized into a regiment, and was enrolled as a private in Company H of the 12th Wisconsin Infantry Regiment.

The 12th Wisconsin Infantry mustered into federal service in January 1862 and proceeded to Missouri for service in the western theater of the war. Due to logistical challenges in southern Illinois, the regiment was exposed to severe cold and food shortages for much of their journey. Curtis served with the regiment through the Vicksburg campaign and Sherman's Atlanta campaign, he was promoted to corporal and re-enlisted at the end of his three year term as a veteran.

He refused several offers to be commissioned as an officer, until July 1864, when he accepted commission as second lieutenant of Company E in the 42nd Wisconsin Infantry Regiment. He served only briefly with the 42nd Wisconsin Infantry, however. He was detached from his company and served as adjutant for the mustering office at Cairo, Illinois, until the end of the war.

== Political career ==
Curtis returned to Green Bay after the war and was admitted to the bar. He was a staunch Republican and was elected to three non-consecutive terms (1869, 1871, 1873) in the Wisconsin State Assembly, representing Green Bay and parts of eastern Brown County. He also ran for election to the 1872 Assembly session, but was defeated in that election. He ran for Wisconsin State Senate twice in the 2nd Senate district, but was defeated both times, in 1869 and 1873.

Curtis was a friend and political ally to the owners of the Green Bay Gazette, and spent a year as editor of the paper in 1877. During the 31st Wisconsin Legislature, he was appointed clerk of the Assembly committee on revision, but had to resign due to his failing health.

He died at his home in Green Bay, in May 1878, after suffering from illness for much of his adult life.

== Electoral history ==
=== Wisconsin Assembly (1868, 1870, 1871, 1872) ===
Wisconsin Assembly, Brown 1st District Election, 1870
Party	Candidate	Votes	%	±%
General Election, November 8, 1870
Republican	Joseph S. Curtis	916	51.29%	+7.56%
Democratic	William J. Abrams	870	48.71%	
Plurality		46	2.58%	-9.97%
Total votes		1,786	100.0%	+37.49%
Republican gain from Democratic				

Wisconsin Assembly, Brown 1st District Election, 1871
Party	Candidate	Votes	%	±%
General Election, November 7, 1871
Democratic	Christian Wœlz	665	53.33%	
Republican	Joseph S. Curtis (incumbent)	582	46.67%	−4.62%
Plurality		83	6.66%	+4.08%
Total votes		1,247	100.0%	-30.18%
Democratic gain from Republican				

Wisconsin Assembly, Brown 1st District Election, 1872
Party	Candidate	Votes	%	±%
General Election, November 5, 1872
Republican	Joseph S. Curtis	1,082	57.68%	+11.00%
Democratic	Christian Wœlz (incumbent)	794	42.32%	
Plurality		288	15.35%	+8.70%
Total votes		1,876	100.0%	+50.44%
Republican gain from Democratic				

=== Wisconsin Senate (1869, 1873) ===
Wisconsin Senate, 2nd District Election, 1869
Party	Candidate	Votes	%	±%
General Election, November 2, 1869
Democratic	Lyman Walker	2,010	51.53%	
Republican	Joseph S. Curtis	1,891	48.47%	
Plurality		119	3.05%	
Total votes		3,901	100.0%	
Democratic hold				

Wisconsin Senate, 2nd District Election, 1873
Party	Candidate	Votes	%	±%
General Election, November 4, 1873
Democratic	John Milton Read	2,893	57.38%	+5.70%
Republican	Joseph S. Curtis	2,149	42.62%	
Plurality		744	14.76%	+11.40%
Total votes		5,042	100.0%	+4.30%
Democratic hold				

Wisconsin State Assembly
Preceded by John B. Eugene	Member of the Wisconsin State Assembly from the Brown 1st district January 4, 1869 – January 3, 1870	Succeeded by Edward Hicks
Preceded by Edward Hicks	Member of the Wisconsin State Assembly from the Brown 1st district January 2, 1871 – January 1, 1872	Succeeded by Christian Wœlz
Preceded by Christian Wœlz	Member of the Wisconsin State Assembly from the Brown 1st district January 6, 1873 – January 5, 1874	Succeeded by Morgan Lewis Martin
