= E. F. Brunette =

American politician

Member of the Wisconsin Senate from the 2nd district
- In office 1933–1937
- Preceded by: Elmer Hall
- Succeeded by: Michael F. Kresky, Jr.

Personal details
- Born: January 26, 1880 Duck Creek, Wisconsin
- Died: March 7, 1960 (aged 80) Howard, Wisconsin
- Party: Democratic

Emanuel Francis Brunette, Jr. (January 26, 1880 – March 7, 1960) was an American politician. He was a member of the Wisconsin State Senate, representing Wisconsin's 2nd Senate District from 1933 to 1937. Before that, he was also a member of the State Assembly from 1920 to 1930. He was a member of the Democratic Party.

Brunette was born in Howard, Wisconsin, where he attended public schools, Green Bay Business College, and the state teachers college in Oshkosh. For many years he served on the Brown County Board of Supervisors, and was the chairman for the town of Howard. Brunette died on March 7, 1960, in Green Bay and was buried at Saint John the Baptist Church Cemetery in Duck Creek.
