= John W. Byrnes =

American politician (1913–1985)

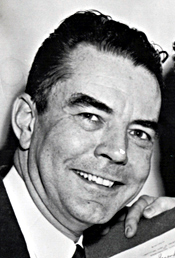
- circa 1956

Member of the U.S. House of Representatives from Wisconsin's 8th district
- In office January 3, 1945 – January 3, 1973
- Preceded by: LaVern Dilweg
- Succeeded by: Harold Vernon Froehlich

Member of the Wisconsin Senate from the 2nd district
- In office 1941–1945
- Preceded by: Michael F. Kresky Jr.
- Succeeded by: Harold A. Lytie

Personal details
- Born: John William Byrnes; June 12, 1913 Green Bay, Wisconsin
- Died: January 12, 1985 (aged 71) Marshfield, Wisconsin
- Party: Republican
- Spouse: Barbara Preston Byrnes
- Children: 6 (3 sons, 3 daughters)
- Education: University of Wisconsin, Madison (BA, LLB)
- Occupation: Attorney

John William Byrnes (June 12, 1913 – January 12, 1985) was an American politician who served as a U.S. representative from Wisconsin.

Byrnes was the U.S. representative for Wisconsin's 8th congressional district from 1945 to 1973. During this time he was the chairman of the House Republican Policy Committee from 1959 to 1965 and was later the ranking minority member of the Committee on Ways and Means from 1963 to 1972.

== Life and career ==
Byrnes was born in Green Bay, Wisconsin, the son of Harriet (Schumacher) and Charles W. Byrnes. Byrnes contracted polio as a small child. He received his bachelor's degree from the University of Wisconsin in Madison in 1936, and then attended its law school. After graduation, Byrnes practiced law in Green Bay, and served as deputy commissioner of the state's department of banking from 1938 to 1941. He served in the state senate from 1941 to 1945, representing the 2nd District.

Byrnes was elected in 1944 as a Republican to the 79th Congress from Wisconsin's 8th district. He defeated one-term incumbent LaVern Dilweg, a notable former professional football player with the Green Bay Packers. Byrnes was reelected to the thirteen succeeding Congresses, and served 28 years from January 1945 to January 1973, making him the 8th district's longest serving representative. In 1964, the Wisconsin delegates to the 1964 Republican National Convention were pledged to support Byrnes, but he released the delegates to support the candidates they individually chose. He did not seek a fifteenth term in 1972 to the 93rd Congress. Byrnes voted in favor of the Civil Rights Acts of 1957, 1960, 1964, and 1968, as well as the establishment of the Wisconsin Islands Wilderness, the 24th Amendment to the U.S. Constitution, and the Voting Rights Act of 1965.

After Congress, stayed in Washington to practice law and continued to reside in Arlington, Virginia. While traveling to Wisconsin for a medical check-up at the Marshfield Clinic, he had a stroke at the Central Wisconsin Airport in Mosinee and died several days later in Marshfield on January 12, 1985. He was buried in Green Bay at Allouez Catholic Cemetery.

Wisconsin Senate
Preceded by Michael F. Kresky Jr.	Member of the Wisconsin Senate from the 2nd district 1941–1945	Succeeded by Harold A. Lytie
U.S. House of Representatives
Preceded by LaVern Dilweg	Member of the U.S. House of Representatives from Wisconsin's 8th congressional district January 3, 1945–January 3, 1973	Succeeded by Harold Vernon Froehlich
Preceded by Noah M. Mason	Ranking Member of the House Ways and Means Committee; 1963–1973	Succeeded by Herman T. Schneebeli
Party political offices
Preceded by Joseph W. Martin Jr.	Chair of the House Republican Policy Committee; 1959–1965	Succeeded by John Jacob Rhodes
