= John Milton Read =

19th century American politician

John M. Read
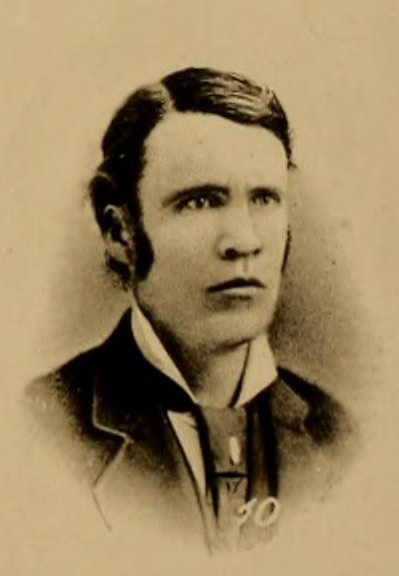
- From Soldiers' and Citizens' Album of Biographical Record of Wisconsin (1888)

Member of the Wisconsin Senate from the 2nd district
- In office January 5, 1874 – January 3, 1876
- Preceded by: Myron P. Lindsley
- Succeeded by: Thomas R. Hudd

Personal details
- Born: November 3, 1842 Louisville, Kentucky, U.S.
- Died: March 9, 1881 (aged 38) Louisville, Kentucky, U.S.
- Resting place: Riverview Public Cemetery, Kewaunee, Wisconsin
- Party: Democratic
- Spouses: Eliza J. Johannes (m. 1870; died 1871); Caroline W. Johannes (m. 1872–1881)
- Children: with Eliza Johannes; Eliza Johannes Read^{(b. 1871; died 1871)}; with Caroline Johannes; Leoni (Arnold)^{(b. 1873; died 1908)}; Hortense (Peters)^{(b. 1875; died 1942)}; Hattie (Karel)^{(b. 1875; died 1945)}

Military service
- Allegiance: United States
- Branch/service: United States Volunteers; Union Army
- Years of service: 1861–1865
- Rank: 1st Lieutenant, USV
- Unit: 14th Reg. Wis. Vol. Infantry
- Battles/wars: American Civil War

John Milton Read (November 3, 1842 – March 9, 1881) was an American journalist, Democratic politician, and Wisconsin pioneer. He was a member of the Wisconsin State Senate, representing Brown, Door, and Kewaunee counties during the 1874 and 1875 sessions. In historical documents, his surname is sometimes spelled Reed.

== Early life ==
Born in Louisville, Kentucky, he moved with his parents to Saint Louis, Missouri, as an infant and then to Milwaukee, Wisconsin Territory, in 1847. They remained in Milwaukee only briefly, then relocated north to Manitowoc, Wisconsin. His father died in Manitowoc, when John was just 8 years old, but he still obtained a common school education there. In Manitowoc, he also learned the printing trade, which he continued to practice until the outbreak of the American Civil War.

== Civil War service ==
He volunteered for service in the Union Army during the first year of the war, and was enrolled in Company E of the 14th Wisconsin Infantry Regiment. While the regiment was being organized, he was promoted to sergeant in his company. The 14th Wisconsin Infantry mustered into federal service in January 1862, and left the state in March, moving to the Union concentration in western Tennessee. They arrived just days before the Battle of Shiloh.

Shortly after Shiloh, Read was promoted to sergeant major—the most senior non-commissioned officer in the regiment. He was wounded and captured at the Second Battle of Corinth, in the fall of 1862, but was released in a prisoner exchange after just a few days. He was wounded again at the Siege of Vicksburg, but remained with the regiment.

He was promoted to adjutant of the regiment and commissioned as a first lieutenant in September 1863. The following March, the regiment took part in the Red River campaign and their colonel, Lyman M. Ward was made brigade commander. Read went with Ward to join his staff as assistant adjutant general for the brigade, and was subsequently promoted to adjutant general. He served as a brigade adjutant general for the rest of the war.

== Politics and publishing career ==
After the war, he resided for a time at Warsaw, Missouri, where he returned to the printing and publishing industry. He returned to Manitowoc after about a year, then moved to Kewaunee, Wisconsin, in the fall of 1868. He became associated with the Kewaunee Enterprise—a Democratic partisan newspaper started by Edward Decker—and purchased the ownership of the paper from Decker in 1869. He would continue as publisher and editor of the paper until his death.

In 1870, he was elected county superintendent of schools, and held office for nine years. While serving in that office, he was also elected to the Wisconsin State Senate in 1873. He represented Wisconsin's 2nd State Senate district, which then comprised all of Brown, Door, and Kewaunee counties.

In 1880, he was elected without opposition to the Wisconsin State Assembly from the Kewaunee district, but he resigned before the start of the 1881 legislative session due to poor health.

He suffered from disease since his time in the war, and decided to travel to a warmer climate to try to recuperate. He first went to Georgia, but found that his health was not improving. He started on his return, but died en route, on March 9, 1881, at Louisville, where he had been born.

His body was returned to Kewaunee, where it was interred.

== Personal life and family ==
John M. Read was the son of Martin and Catherine (née Divens) Read. He was married twice. His first wife was Eliza Johannes, the daughter of county judge and Kewaunee mayor Frederick Johannes. Their marriage lasted less than a year, as Eliza died in the summer of 1871. They had one daughter together, but she died in infancy that fall. The following year, on August 10, 1872, Read married Caroline Johannes, a sister of his first wife. He had three daughters with his second wife, who all survived him.

== Electoral history ==
=== Wisconsin Senate (1873) ===
Wisconsin Senate, 2nd District Election, 1873
Party	Candidate	Votes	%	±%
General Election, November 4, 1873
Democratic	John Milton Read	2,893	57.38%	+5.70%
Republican	Joseph S. Curtis	2,149	42.62%	
Plurality		744	14.76%	+11.40%
Total votes		5,042	100.0%	+4.30%
Democratic hold				

Wisconsin State Assembly
Preceded by Myron P. Lindsley	Member of the Wisconsin Senate from the 2nd district January 5, 1874 – January 3, 1876	Succeeded by Thomas R. Hudd
