= Andrew Caldwell Mailer =

American politician (1853–1909)

Member of the Wisconsin Senate from the 2nd district
- In office 1897–1901
- Preceded by: Robert J. McGeehan
- Succeeded by: Henry F. Hagemeister

Personal details
- Born: April 4, 1853 De Pere, Wisconsin
- Died: December 3, 1909 (aged 56) De Pere, Wisconsin
- Party: Republican

Andrew Caldwell Mailer (April 4, 1853 – December 3, 1909) was an American politician. He was a member of the Wisconsin State Senate, representing Wisconsin's 2nd Senate District from 1897 to 1901. He was a member of the Republican Party.

== Life ==
Mailer was born in De Pere, Wisconsin, and attended Lawrence University in Appleton, the University of Michigan at Ann Arbor, Rush Medical College in Chicago, and the Bellevue Hospital Medical College in New York City. He was connected with the Pharmaceutical industry for four years before entering the profession of medicine.

He was a member of the De Pere Board of Education from 1890 to 1896, superintendent of the city schools for a few years, and was mayor of De Pere from 1892 to 1894. He died in De Pere, Wisconsin on December 3, 1909.
