= Fred F. Kaftan =

American politician (1916–2001)

Member of the Wisconsin Senate from the 2nd district
- In office January 3, 1949 – January 5, 1953
- Preceded by: Harold A. Lytie
- Succeeded by: Leo P. O'Brien

Personal details
- Born: August 25, 1916 Green Bay, Wisconsin, U.S.
- Died: November 9, 2001 (aged 85) Allouez, Wisconsin. U.S.
- Resting place: De Pere Greenwood Cemetery, De Pere, Wisconsin
- Party: Republican
- Education: University of Wisconsin Law School
- Profession: Attorney

Military service
- Allegiance: United States
- Branch/service: United States Navy
- Years of service: 1944–1946
- Battles/wars: World War II

Frederick Frank Kaftan (August 25, 1916 – November 9, 2001) was an American lawyer and Republican politician from Green Bay, Wisconsin. He served four years in the Wisconsin Senate, representing Wisconsin's 2nd Senate district from 1949 to 1953.

== Biography ==
He was born in Green Bay, Wisconsin. He graduated from the University of Wisconsin Law School. From 1944 to 1946 he served in the United States Navy. He died on November 9, 2001.

== Career ==
Kaftan served as a state senator for Wisconsin's 2nd Senate district from 1949 to 1953. He was a Republican. He quit politics in 1952 to focus on his professional legal practice.
