= Grégoire Dupont =

American politician

Member of the Wisconsin State Assembly from the 1st Brown County district
- In office 1887–1887

Personal details
- Born: December 18, 1842 Pietrebais, Province of Brabant, Belgium
- Died: July 1, 1917 (aged 74) Robinsonville, Wisconsin, US
- Party: Republican
- Spouse: Julie Henrion (m. 1862)

Grégoire Joseph Dupont (December 18, 1842 – July 1, 1917) was a Belgian-American politician. He served in the Wisconsin State Assembly in 1887, representing Brown County's first district.

== Biography ==
Dupont was born in Belgium in 1842, and immigrated to Wisconsin in 1855. He married fellow Belgian Julie Henrion at Bay Settlement, Wisconsin, in 1862, and they had nine children together. At various points in his life, Dupont was occupied as a shingle mill laborer, photographer and farmer. He lived in Robinsonville, Wisconsin.

Dupont was a member of the 18th Wisconsin Infantry in the American Civil War. He served in the Wisconsin State Assembly in 1887 as the representative for northeastern Brown County. Dupont was one of the first Belgian-Americans from northeast Wisconsin to serve in the Assembly; others included Joseph Wery, Constant Martin, Benjamin Fontaine and John B. Eugene. Dupont was also a school board member, the town chairman for Green Bay, a Brown County supervisor for the town of Green Bay and a member of the Green Bay Dairy Board of Trade.

Dupont died on July 1, 1917.

== Electoral history ==
Wisconsin Assembly, Brown County 1st District, 1886
Party	Candidate	Votes	%
General Election
Republican	Grégoire Dupont	1,598	57.21%
Democratic	R. W. Cook	1,158	41.46%
Prohibitionist	C. Dubois	37	1.32%
Total votes		2,793	100.0%
