= Benjamin Fontaine =

19th century American politician

Member of the Wisconsin State Assembly from the Brown 1st district
- In office January 5, 1880 – January 2, 1882
- Preceded by: David M. Kelly
- Succeeded by: John M. Hogan

Personal details
- Born: February 27, 1837 Pietrebais, Province of Brabant, Belgium
- Died: January 9, 1910 (aged 72) Green Bay, Wisconsin, U.S.
- Resting place: Fort Howard Memorial Park, Green Bay
- Party: Republican
- Spouse: Desiree Fontaine
- Children: 4

Benjamin F. Fontaine (February 27, 1837 – January 9, 1910) was a Belgian American hardware merchant and politician. He served as a member of the Wisconsin State Assembly in 1880 and 1881, representing northeast Brown County.

== Biography ==
Fontaine was born in 1837 in Belgium, and was educated to the standards of the time. He moved to the Town of Green Bay in 1855 and later moved to the town of Scott, where he lived from 1860 to 1864 and was town chairman in 1863. From there, he moved to Green Bay, Wisconsin in 1865 and started a hardware business in 1870, which he maintained until 1907.

He was elected to the Wisconsin State Assembly from Brown County's 1st Assembly district for the 1880 session and was re-elected for the 1881 term. Fontaine was one of the first Belgian-American immigrants to northeastern Wisconsin to serve in the Assembly; others included Joseph Wery, Constant Martin, John B. Eugene and Grégoire Dupont. Immediately following his time in the Assembly, Fontaine served two terms on the Green Bay City Council. In 1892, Fontaine was a founding member of the Belgian Republicans Club in Green Bay.

Fontaine was married and had four children. He died on January 9, 1910, and was buried at Fort Howard Cemetery.
