= David Youngs =

American politician

David Youngs was an American lumberman from Ahnapee, Wisconsin who spent one term as a member of the Wisconsin State Assembly for the district consisting of Door and Kewaunee Counties. Although contemporary newspapers describe him as a Republican, he was officially recorded as a Union Party member.

== Private affairs ==
Youngs was born in Scotland; as of 1867 he was 39 years of age, and had been in Wisconsin for 30 years. He listed his profession as "lumberman". In July 1867 Youngs was a signatory (with Thomas McDill and others) to a letter calling for a meeting in Madison in order to organize a Lumberman's Association of Wisconsin.

== Elective office ==
Youngs served a single one-year term in the Assembly, in a new district previously represented by Democrat Constant Martin (Kewaunee County) and Unionist Isaac Stephenson (Door County). He was assigned to the standing committees on internal improvements and on contingent expenditures. He was defeated for re-election in late 1867 by Democrat Moses Kilgore.

== Death ==
Youngs died on August 5, 1874, from erysipelas at his home in Ahnapee, Wisconsin.
