= Lyman Walker =

19th-century American politician

Member of the Wisconsin Senate from the 2nd district
- In office January 3, 1870 – January 1, 1872
- Preceded by: William J. Abrams
- Succeeded by: Myron P. Lindsley

Member of the Wisconsin State Assembly from the Kewaunee district
- In office January 2, 1865 – January 1, 1866
- Preceded by: Nelson Boutin
- Succeeded by: Constant Martin

District Attorney of Kewaunee County, Wisconsin
- In office January 4, 1875 – June 1, 1878
- Preceded by: T. E. Hoyt
- Succeeded by: James W. Coapman
- In office January 7, 1861 – January 2, 1871
- Preceded by: Louis C. Van Dycke
- Succeeded by: John R. McDonald

Personal details
- Born: May 30, 1799 Tully, New York, U.S.
- Died: October 16, 1886 (aged 87) Casco, Wisconsin, U.S.
- Cause of death: Stroke
- Resting place: Evergreen Cemetery, Manitowoc, Wisconsin
- Spouse: Miriam Winslow (m. 1822; died 1850)
- Children: Charlotte Cornelia (Williams)^{(b. 1823; died 1871)}; Charles Henry Walker^{(b. 1828; died 1877)}; Jared Winslow Walker^{(b. 1833; died 1854)}; Lucy Anne Walker^{(b. 1835; died 1836)}; Horace M. Walker^{(b. 1838; died 1863)}
- Profession: lawyer

Lyman Walker (May 30, 1799 – October 16, 1886) was an American lawyer and Democratic politician. He was a member of the Wisconsin State Senate and Assembly, representing Brown, Door, and Kewaunee counties. He also served 13 years as district attorney of Kewaunee County.

== Biography ==
Born in Tully, New York, Walker was a lawyer. He served as Tully town supervisor from 1834 to 1836 and as deputy sheriff for Onondaga County, New York, from 1828 to 1834. He moved to Ohio, in 1842 and was appointed postmaster at Cochranton by President Franklin Pierce, and then at Milan by President James Polk.

In 1855, Walker moved to Anhapee, Kewaunee County, Wisconsin. In Kewaunee County, he became active with the Democratic Party of Wisconsin. In 1856, Kewaunee County held its first elections for state offices and elected Louis Van Dycke as district attorney without opposition. Van Dycke, however, was not a lawyer, and as a result, the county contracted with lawyers to represent the district attorney's office in court. In 1859, Walker was selected to fill that role by the circuit court judge David Taylor. Walker was then elected district attorney at the 1860 election and was consecutively re-elected to four subsequent terms, leaving office in 1871.

While serving as district attorney, he was elected to represent Kewaunee County in the Wisconsin State Assembly in the 1865 session, running on the Democratic Party ticket. He was then elected county superintendent in 1866. In 1869, he was elected to the Wisconsin State Senate on the Democratic ticket. He served a two-year term representing the 2nd State Senate district, which then comprised all of Brown, Door, and Kewaunee counties. He was noted as the oldest member of the Senate during the 1871 session, then age 72.

After his term in the Senate, he won two more terms as district attorney, serving from 1875 until his resignation in 1878. He retired in 1878 and moved to Manitowoc County, Wisconsin, to reside with his son's widow, Elizabeth Mallory Walker, and his grandchildren. In 1880, Elizabeth married Edward Decker and Walker moved with them to Casco, Wisconsin.

Lyman Walker died at Decker's home after a series of strokes on October 16, 1886.

== Personal life and family ==
Lyman Walker married Miriam Winslow at Hillsdale, New York, on November 5, 1822. They had five children, though one died in infancy and another died in early adulthood. His wife died in November 1850, before he moved to Wisconsin.

His eldest child was Charlotte Cornelia, who married in 1843 and was widowed with two children in 1862. She then moved to Ahnapee, to reside with her father until her death in 1871.

Both of Walker's surviving sons' served as Union Army officers during the American Civil War. His elder son, Charles H. Walker, was captain of Company K and later major of the 21st Wisconsin Infantry Regiment. He also served as a Wisconsin state legislator and county judge. His younger son, Horace, was captain of Company A in the 5th Wisconsin Infantry Regiment. He died at the Second Battle of Rappahannock Station. Grand Army of the Republic Post #18 was named in his honor.

Walker ultimately outlived all of his children.

== Electoral history ==
=== Wisconsin Senate (1869) ===
Wisconsin Senate, 2nd District Election, 1869
Party	Candidate	Votes	%	±%
General Election, November 2, 1869
Democratic	Lyman Walker	2,010	51.53%	
Republican	Joseph S. Curtis	1,891	48.47%	
Plurality		119	3.05%	
Total votes		3,901	100.0%	
Democratic hold				

Wisconsin State Assembly
Preceded by Nelson Boutin	Member of the Wisconsin State Assembly from the Kewaunee district January 2, 1865 – January 1, 1866	Succeeded by Constant Martin
Wisconsin Senate
Preceded by William J. Abrams	Member of the Wisconsin Senate from the 2nd district January 3, 1870 – January 1, 1872	Succeeded by Myron P. Lindsley
Legal offices
Preceded by T. E. Hoyt	District Attorney of Kewaunee County, Wisconsin; January 4, 1875 – June 1, 1878	Succeeded by James W. Coapman
Preceded by Louis C. Van Dycke	District Attorney of Kewaunee County, Wisconsin; January 7, 1861 – January 2, 1871	Succeeded by John R. McDonald
