= Edward Hicks (pioneer) =

19th century American politician

Member of the Wisconsin State Assembly from the Brown 1st district district
- In office January 3, 1870 – January 2, 1871
- Preceded by: Joseph S. Curtis
- Succeeded by: Joseph S. Curtis

Member of the Wisconsin Senate from the 2nd district
- In office January 6, 1862 – January 4, 1864
- Preceded by: Edward Decker
- Succeeded by: Frederick S. Ellis

Personal details
- Born: October 24, 1818 Conneaut, Ohio, U.S.
- Died: May 15, 1873 (aged 54) Sioux City, Iowa, U.S.
- Cause of death: Stroke
- Party: Democratic
- Spouse: Charlotte Gertrude Satterlee (m. 1847–1873)
- Children: George Douglas Hicks^{(b. 1852; died 1925)}; Edward Livingston Hicks^{(b. 1859; died 1933)}; William Hicks^{(b. 1860)}

Edward Hicks (October 24, 1818 – May 15, 1873) was an American merchant, Democratic politician, and Wisconsin pioneer. He was a member of the Wisconsin Senate (1862, 1863) and State Assembly (1870), representing Brown County. He was postmaster of Green Bay for about 12 years during the 1840s and 1850s.

== Biography ==
Edward Hicks was born in Conneaut, Ohio, in October 1818. He received a common school and academic education, and moved west to the Wisconsin Territory in the early 1840s. He settled in Green Bay, where he remained for nearly three decades. Hicks was affiliated with the Democratic Party, and under President James K. Polk, he was appointed postmaster at Green Bay, serving until the end of the Polk administration. He was subsequently re-appointed postmaster in 1853, under President Franklin Pierce, and was retained as postmaster under President James Buchanan.

In 1861, Hicks was the Democratic Party nominee for Wisconsin Senate in the 2nd Senate district, which then comprised Brown and Kewaunee counties. Hicks faced no opponent in the general election and went on to serve in the 1862 and 1863 sessions of the legislature. He was not a candidate for re-election in 1863.

He was named postmaster of Green Bay again in 1866, under President Andrew Johnson, but he was one of several Johnson nominees ultimately rejected by the Republican Senate.

In 1869, Hicks ran for state office again, running as the Democratic nominee for Wisconsin State Assembly in Brown County's 1st Assembly district. The district then comprised Green Bay and roughly the eastern half of Brown County. He defeated Republican Louis Schiller in the general election and went on to serve in the 1870 legislative session.

Hicks moved to Sioux City, Iowa, in 1871, after suffering from poor health. He died of a stroke in Sioux City on May 15, 1873.

== Personal life and family ==
Edward Hicks was the only known son of Joseph Hicks and his wife Sally (née Chamberland). The Hicks family were descended from Dennis Hicks, who settled at the Massachusetts Bay Colony in the early 1700s.

Edward Hicks married Charlotte Gertrude Satterlee about 1847, in Stonington, Connecticut. They had at least three sons.

== Electoral history ==
=== Wisconsin Assembly (1869) ===
Wisconsin Assembly, Brown 1st District Election, 1869
Party	Candidate	Votes	%	±%
General Election, November 2, 1869
Democratic	Edward Hicks	731	56.27%	
Republican	Louis Schiller	568	43.73%	
Plurality		163	12.55%	
Total votes		1,299	100.0%	
Democratic gain from Republican				

Wisconsin State Assembly
Preceded by Joseph S. Curtis	Member of the Wisconsin State Assembly from the Brown 1st district January 3, 1870 – January 2, 1871	Succeeded by Joseph S. Curtis
Wisconsin Senate
Preceded by Edward Decker	Member of the Wisconsin Senate from the 2nd district January 6, 1862 – January 4, 1864	Succeeded by Frederick S. Ellis
