= Thomas R. Hudd =

American politician (1835–1896)

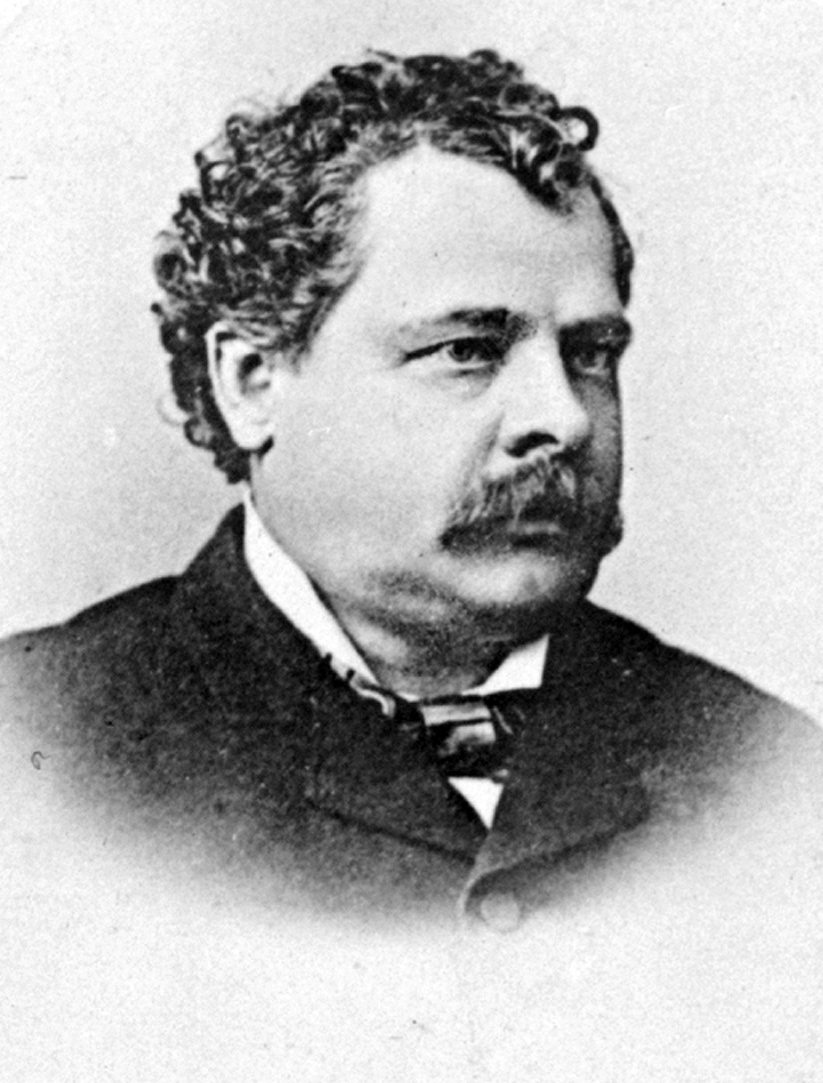
- Brady-Handy photo, Library of Congress

Member of the U.S. House of Representatives from Wisconsin's 5th district
- In office March 8, 1886 – March 3, 1889
- Preceded by: Joseph Rankin
- Succeeded by: George H. Brickner

Member of the Wisconsin Senate from the 2nd district
- In office January 11, 1882 – March 8, 1886
- Preceded by: David M. Kelly
- Succeeded by: Charles W. Day
- In office January 12, 1876 – January 14, 1880
- Preceded by: John Milton Read
- Succeeded by: David M. Kelly

Member of the Wisconsin Senate from the 22nd district
- In office January 8, 1862 – January 13, 1864
- Preceded by: Benjamin Ferguson
- Succeeded by: Joseph Harris

Member of the Wisconsin State Assembly from the Brown 1st district
- In office January 13, 1875 – January 12, 1876
- Preceded by: Morgan Lewis Martin
- Succeeded by: Mitchell Resch

Member of the Wisconsin State Assembly from the Outagamie district
- In office January 8, 1868 – January 13, 1869
- Preceded by: W.H.P. Bogan
- Succeeded by: Charles E. McIntosh

District Attorney of Outagamie County, Wisconsin
- In office 1856–1857

Personal details
- Born: October 1, 1835 Buffalo, New York, U.S.
- Died: June 22, 1896 (aged 60) Green Bay, Wisconsin, U.S.
- Cause of death: Stroke
- Resting place: Woodlawn Cemetery, Green Bay
- Party: Democratic

Thomas Richard Hudd (October 1, 1835 – June 22, 1896) was an American lawyer and Democratic politician from northeast Wisconsin. He served three years in the U.S. House of Representatives, representing Wisconsin's 5th congressional district from 1886 to 1889. He previously served ten years in the Wisconsin Senate and two years in the State Assembly, and served various local offices.

== Background ==
Hudd was born in Buffalo, New York, on October 1, 1835 to immigrants from England: his father Richard Hudd was a painter and decorator from Lacock, and his mother Mary née Harrison was from Barby. After the drowning death of his father in 1841, Hudd moved with his mother to Chicago, Illinois, in 1842 and to Appleton, Wisconsin, in 1853. He attended the common schools and Lawrence University in Appleton. He worked as a "printer boy" in the office of the Appleton Crescent, studied law, was admitted to the bar in 1856, and went into practice in Appleton.

== First public offices ==
He served as district attorney of Outagamie County in 1856 and 1857. He was first elected to the Wisconsin State Senate in 1861 for a two-year term from the Wisconsin Senate, District 22 (Door, Oconto, Outagamie and Shawanaw [sic] counties) as a Democrat (Democratic incumbent Benjamin Ferguson was not a candidate). He was defeated for re-election in 1863 by Joseph Harris, who was a Republican/Union Party candidate. He was elected to the Wisconsin State Assembly's Outagamie County seat in 1867, succeeding fellow Democrat W. H. P. Bogan, but did not run for re-election, since he was leaving the county. The seat was taken by C. E. McIntosh, another Democrat.

== Move to Green Bay ==
Hudd moved to Green Bay, Wisconsin, in 1868 and continued the practice of law there. He served as city attorney of Green Bay in 1873 and 1874, and in 1874 was elected to the Assembly's First Brown County district (the City of Green Bay, and the Towns of Bellevue, Eaton, Green Bay, Humboldt, Preble and Scott) as a "Democratic Reform" candidate (the Reform Party was a short-lived coalition of Democrats, reform and Liberal Republicans, and Grangers formed in 1873 which secured the election of one Governor of Wisconsin and a number of state legislators). Incumbent Morgan L. Martin, a former War Democrat turned independent who aligned himself with the Liberal Republicans in opposing the re-election of Ulysses S. Grant), was not a candidate. Hudd won 1,160 votes to 1,075 for Republican Hosmer Kellog Cowles.

He was elected once more to the Senate, this time to the Second District (Brown, Door and Kewaunee counties) for the 1876-1877 term, as a "Democratic Reform" candidate, winning 4018 votes to 2036 for Republican George Grimmer. In 1877 he was re-elected as a Democrat (the Reform coalition having collapsed by then), with 1874 votes to 1593 for Republican State Representative William Fisk and 638 for Greenbacker B. F. Smith. He was not a candidate for re-election in 1879, and was succeeded by Republican Speaker of the Assembly David M. Kelly.

Hudd served as a delegate to the 1880 Democratic National Convention, and was elected once more to the Senate in 1881, in a new Second District consisting solely of Brown County. Kelly was not a candidate, and Hudd took back the seat with 2152 votes to 1777 for Republican State Representative James Rasmussen. He was re-elected in 1884 for what was now a four-year term, with 3,585 votes to 3,087 for Republican Charles W. Day.

== Congress and after ==
On February 23, 1886, Hudd was elected as a Democrat to the Forty-ninth Congress to fill the vacancy for Wisconsin's 5th congressional district caused by the death of Joseph Rankin; Charles Day succeeded him in the Senate seat they had contested. Hudd was reelected to the Fiftieth Congress and served from March 8, 1886, to March 3, 1889. He served as chairman of the Committee on Expenditures in the Department of the Interior (Fiftieth Congress).

He did not seek renomination in 1888, and resumed the practice of law. He died of a stroke in Green Bay on June 22, 1896, and was interred in Woodlawn Cemetery.

== Sources ==
- United States Congress. "Thomas R. Hudd (id: H000902)". Biographical Directory of the United States Congress.

U.S. House of Representatives
Preceded by Joseph Rankin	Member of the U.S. House of Representatives from Wisconsin's 5th congressional district March 8, 1886 – March 3, 1889	Succeeded by George H. Brickner
