= David M. Kelly =

American politician (1841–1916)

29th Speaker of the Wisconsin State Assembly
- In office January 1879 – January 1880
- Preceded by: Augustus Barrows
- Succeeded by: Alexander A. Arnold

Member of the Wisconsin Senate from the 2nd district
- In office January 5, 1880 – January 2, 1882
- Preceded by: Thomas R. Hudd
- Succeeded by: Thomas R. Hudd

Member of the Wisconsin State Assembly from the Brown 1st district
- In office January 1, 1877 – January 5, 1880
- Preceded by: Mitchell Resch
- Succeeded by: Benjamin Fontaine

Personal details
- Born: February 11, 1841 Hamilton, Massachusetts, U.S.
- Died: after January 21, 1916 (aged 74)
- Party: Republican
- Spouse: Catherine H. "Kate" Herbert (m. 1882)
- Profession: Lawyer

Military service
- Allegiance: United States
- Branch/service: United States Volunteers; Union Army
- Rank: Quartermaster
- Battles/wars: American Civil War

David Marsh Kelly (born February 11, 1841; disappeared January 21, 1916) was an American lawyer and Republican politician from Green Bay, Wisconsin. He was the 29th speaker of the Wisconsin State Assembly (1879) and also served two years in the Wisconsin Senate (1880, 1881), representing Brown County. He disappeared mysteriously in 1916 and was never heard from again.

== Early years ==
Kelly was born on February 11, 1841, in Hamilton, Massachusetts. After serving with the Union Army during the American Civil War, he moved to Appleton, Wisconsin, in 1867 before settling in Green Bay, Wisconsin, the following year.

== Legislative career ==
After having been a member of the Wisconsin State Assembly in 1877 and 1878, Kelly was Speaker of the Assembly in 1879. From 1880 to 1881, he represented the 2nd District in the Senate. He was a Republican.

== Disappearance ==
Kelly returned to Massachusetts in 1884. In February 1916, he was reported to have disappeared, having last been seen on January 21 in his office in Boston, from which he was thought to be taking a train to his home in Sharon, Massachusetts. He was not found despite an intensive search, including hired detectives, and in September of that year members of his Civil War regiment discussed his disappearance at their annual reunion.

== See also ==
- List of people who disappeared mysteriously: 1910–1990

Wisconsin State Assembly
Preceded by Mitchell Resch	Member of the Wisconsin State Assembly from the Brown 1st district January 1, 1877 – January 5, 1880	Succeeded by Benjamin Fontaine
Preceded by Augustus Barrows	Speaker of the Wisconsin State Assembly; January 1879 – January 1880	Succeeded by Alexander A. Arnold
Wisconsin Senate
Preceded by Thomas R. Hudd	Member of the Wisconsin Senate from the 2nd district January 5, 1880 – January 2, 1882	Succeeded by Thomas R. Hudd
