= Joshua L. Johns =

American politician (1881–1947)

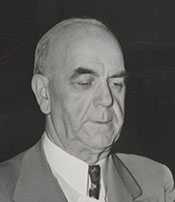

Member of the U.S. House of Representatives from Wisconsin's 8th district
- In office January 3, 1939 – January 3, 1943
- Preceded by: George J. Schneider
- Succeeded by: Lavern Dilweg

Personal details
- Born: February 27, 1881 Eagle, Richland County, Wisconsin, U.S.
- Died: March 16, 1947 (aged 66) Green Bay, Wisconsin, U.S.
- Party: Republican

Joshua Leroy Johns (February 27, 1881 – March 16, 1947) was a U.S. Representative from Wisconsin.

Johns was born in the town of Eagle, Wisconsin, on February 27, 1881. He attended the public schools there. He engaged in banking in Richland Center, Wisconsin, from 1902 to 1905. He graduated from the law department of the University of Chattanooga, Chattanooga, Tennessee, in 1906 and from Yale University in 1907. He was admitted to the Tennessee bar in 1906 and commenced practice in Chattanooga, Tennessee, in 1907. He was admitted to the Wisconsin bar in 1910 and commenced practice in Richland Center, Wisconsin. He moved to Appleton, Wisconsin, in 1920 and continued the practice of law. He was also interested in various business enterprises. He served as a colonel in the Wisconsin National Guard from 1928 to 1929.

Johns was elected as a Republican to the Seventy-sixth and Seventy-seventh Congresses (January 3, 1939 – January 3, 1943). He represented Wisconsin's 8th congressional district. He was an unsuccessful candidate for reelection in 1942 to the Seventy-eighth Congress. He resumed the practice of law in Green Bay, Wisconsin, and also served as president of several lumber companies. He died of a heart attack in Green Bay on March 16, 1947. He was interred in Fort Howard Cemetery.

== Sources ==
- United States Congress. "Joshua L. Johns (id: J000111)". Biographical Directory of the United States Congress.

U.S. House of Representatives
Preceded by George J. Schneider	Member of the U.S. House of Representatives from Wisconsin's 8th congressional district January 3, 1939 - January 3, 1943	Succeeded by Lavern Dilweg
