= Eleanor Coleman =

American swimmer

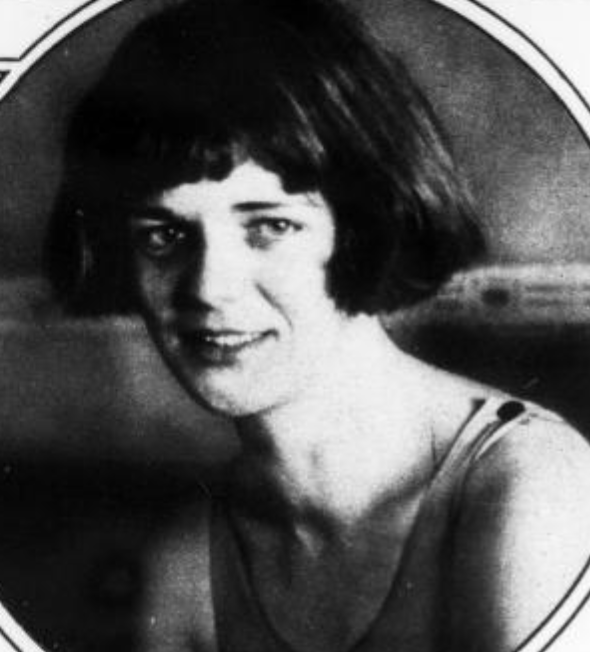
- Eleanor Coleman, from a 1924 publication

Personal information
- Born: March 10, 1905 Chicago, Illinois, U.S.
- Died: October 2, 1978 (aged 73) Green Bay, Wisconsin, U.S.
- Spouse: LaVern Dilweg (m. 1927; died 1968)
- Children: 4, including Gary
- Relatives: Anthony Dilweg (grandson)

Sport
- Sport: Swimming

Eleanor Coleman (March 10, 1905 – October 2, 1978) was an American swimmer.

== Early life ==
Coleman was born in Chicago and raised in Milwaukee, Wisconsin, the daughter of Charles Lemuel Coleman and Nellie May Emerson Coleman. Both of her parents were born in Illinois; her father was a traveling salesman.

== Career ==
Coleman broke the world record in 1922 in the 100 yd breaststroke and competed in the women's 200 metre breaststroke event at the 1924 Summer Olympics. For three years she held a world's record in the women's breaststroke. Later in life, she gave swimming demonstrations, and was a Red Cross examiner for lifesaving. Beyond the pool, she was a sports writer and editor at the Wisconsin News. She also had a newspaper column and hosted a weekly radio show, both on women's health and fitness. She was appointed promotional chair for the American Red Cross in Brown County in 1939.

== Personal life and legacy ==
In 1927, she married Marquette University and Green Bay Packers football player, and later Congressman, LaVern Dilweg. The Dilwegs had four children. Her husband died in 1968, and she died in 1978, aged 73 years, in Green Bay, Wisconsin. Her son Gary Dilweg served in the Wisconsin state legislature. Her grandson Anthony Dilweg played football at Duke University, and later with the Green Bay Packers.
