= Christian Wœlz =

American politician

Johann Leonard Frederick Christian Wœlz or Woelz (October 20, 1826 – November 22, 1888) was an American merchant from Green Bay, Wisconsin, who served a single one-year term as a Democratic member of the Wisconsin State Assembly in the 25th Wisconsin Legislature (the 1872 session).

== Background ==
Wœlz was born October 20, 1826, in Weikersheim in the Kingdom of Württemberg. He received a common school education. He came to the United States in 1847, settling briefly in Weinsberg, Ohio, before coming to Green Bay, where he ran a general store on Main Street. He married Maria Magdalena Goetzman on August 20, 1868; they would have a son and a daughter.

== Public office ==
He had served four yearly terms on the Green Bay city council, and one on the Brown County board of supervisors, before being elected in 1871 from the 1st Brown County district (the Towns of Bellevue, Eaton, Green Bay, Humboldt, Preble and Scott and the City of Green Bay), unseating Republican incumbent Joseph S. Curtis with 665 votes to Curtis' 582. He was assigned to the standing committees on federal relations and legislative expenditures. Wœlz ran for re-election in 1872, but lost to Curtis with 794 votes to Curtis' 1,182.

== Death and legacy ==
He died November 22, 1888, in Green Bay.

The former East River School at the corner of Elm and 12th (Irwin Avenue) in Green Bay, built on land donated by Wœlz, was re-named the Woelz School in his honor in 1899. The school was demolished in 1938.
