= Henry F. Hagemeister =

American politician (1855–1915)

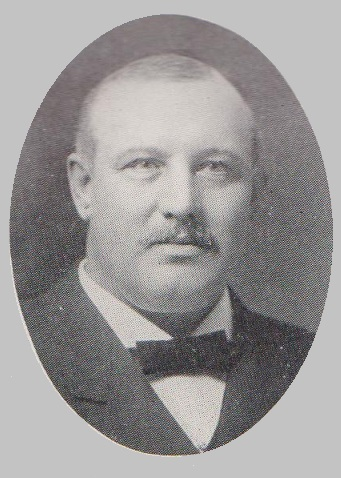
- From the Wisconsin Blue Book

Member of the Wisconsin Senate from the 2nd district
- In office January 7, 1901 – January 4, 1909
- Preceded by: Andrew Caldwell Mailer
- Succeeded by: Timothy Burke

Member of the Wisconsin State Assembly from the Brown 1st district
- In office January 2, 1893 – January 4, 1897
- Preceded by: Albert L. Gray
- Succeeded by: Thomas J. McGrath

Personal details
- Born: November 18, 1855 Green Bay, Wisconsin, U.S.
- Died: June 27, 1915 (aged 59) Door County, Wisconsin, U.S.
- Resting place: Woodlawn Cemetery, Allouez, Wisconsin
- Party: Republican (1900s); Natl. Democratic (1896–1900); Democratic (before 1896)
- Spouse: Josephine Hilton (m. 1903–1915)
- Children: Henry Frank Hagemeister Jr.^{(b. 1904; died 1985)}; Karl Hagemeister^{(b. 1908; died 1978)}
- Occupation: Brewer, banker, politician

Henry Frank Hagemeister (November 18, 1855 – June 27, 1915) was an American brewer, banker, and politician from Green Bay, Wisconsin. He was the namesake of Hagemeister Park, the first home field of the Green Bay Packers professional football team; he was also the founder and namesake of Hagemeister Brewing Company. Hagemeister also held elected office, representing Brown County for eight years in the Wisconsin Senate (1901–1909) and for four years in the state Assembly (1893–1897), and serving as chairman of the Brown County Board of Supervisors.

Politically, Hagemeister was originally a Democrat and served in the Assembly as a Democrat, but split with the party over the populist agenda of William Jennings Bryan in the 1890s. He identified with the short-lived National Democratic Party (Gold Democrats) before joining the Republican Party, and was elected to his terms in the state Senate as a Republican.

== Biography ==
Henry Hagemeister was born in Green Bay, Wisconsin, in 1855, and educated in the parochial and public schools of Green Bay. He would go on to work in brewing and banking, as the president of the Hagemeister Brewing Company, and president of Kellogg's National Bank.

He died on June 27, 1915, at his home near Sturgeon Bay, Wisconsin, and was buried in Woodlawn Cemetery in Allouez, Wisconsin.

== Political career ==
Before being elected to the Assembly in 1892, Hagemeister was a member of the Green Bay city council and the Brown County board of supervisors, and was chairman of the county board while in the Assembly. He served in the Assembly for two terms, and later in the Senate from 1901 to 1909.

While in the Assembly, he was a member of the Democratic Party, but split with the party—like several other prominent Wisconsin Democrats—over the nomination of William Jennings Bryan and the party's turn toward populism. He first joined with the "Gold Democrats" and then became a progressive Republican.

Running on the Republican ticket, he was elected to the Wisconsin Senate in 1900 and was re-elected in 1904, leaving office in 1909.

Wisconsin State Assembly
Preceded by Albert L. Gray	Member of the Wisconsin State Assembly from the Brown 1st district January 2, 1893 – January 4, 1897	Succeeded by Thomas J. McGrath
Wisconsin Senate
Preceded by Andrew Caldwell Mailer	Member of the Wisconsin Senate from the 2nd district January 7, 1901 – January 4, 1909	Succeeded by Timothy Burke
