= Gary T. Dilweg =

American politician (1937–2025)

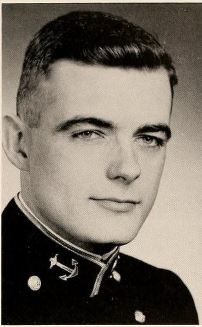

Member of the Wisconsin State Assembly from the 4th district
- In office January 1, 1979 – January 3, 1983
- Preceded by: John C. Gower
- Succeeded by: Barbara Ulichny

Personal details
- Born: Gary Thomas Dilweg; January 3, 1937 Green Bay, Wisconsin
- Died: January 12, 2025 (aged 88)
- Children: 3
- Parent(s): LaVern Dilweg (father); Eleanor Coleman Dilweg (mother)
- Education: United States Naval Academy; University of Texas Law School

Gary Thomas Dilweg (January 3, 1937 – January 12, 2025) was an American politician, teacher, and businessman.

== Background ==
Born in Green Bay, Wisconsin, Dilweg received his bachelor's degree from the United States Naval Academy in 1960 and then went to the University of Texas Law School from 1964 to 1966. He served in the United States Marine Corps from 1960 to 1964. Dilweg lived in the De Pere, Brown County, Wisconsin. Dilweg was a sales manager, engineer and high school teacher. In 1974, Dilweg served on the De Pere School Board. From 1979 to 1983, Dilweg served the 4th District in the Wisconsin State Assembly and was a Republican.

== Personal life and family ==
Dilweg's father LaVern Dilweg served in the United States House of Representatives from Wisconsin. His mother, Eleanor Coleman Dilweg (1906–1978) was an Olympic swimmer from Milwaukee and a former world record holder.

Dilweg died on January 12, 2025, at the age of 88.
