= LaVern Dilweg =

American football player and politician

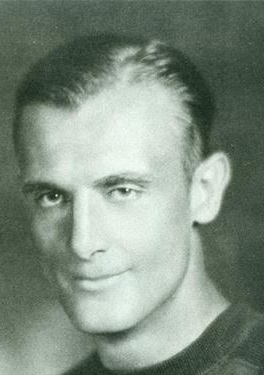

Member of the U.S. House of Representatives from Wisconsin's 8th district
- In office January 3, 1943 – January 3, 1945
- Preceded by: Joshua L. Johns
- Succeeded by: John W. Byrnes

Personal details
- Born: November 1, 1903 Milwaukee, Wisconsin, U.S.
- Died: January 2, 1968 (aged 64) St. Petersburg, Florida, U.S.
- Party: Democratic
- Spouse: Eleanor Coleman (m. 1927)
- Children: 3, including Gary
- Relatives: Anthony Dilweg (grandson)
- Education: Marquette University; Marquette University Law School
- Football career

No. 70
- Position: End

Personal information
- Listed height: 6 ft 3 in (1.91 m)
- Listed weight: 200 lb (91 kg)

Career information
- High school: Washington (WI)
- College: Marquette

Career history
- Milwaukee Badgers (1926); Green Bay Packers (1927–1934)

Awards and highlights
- 3× NFL champion (1929, 1930, 1931); NFL's 1920s All-Decade Team; 5× First-team All-Pro (1927–31); 3× Second-team All-Pro (1926, 1932–33); Green Bay Packers Hall of Fame

Career NFL statistics
- Games played: 107
- Receptions: 23
- Receiving touchdowns: 12
- Stats at Pro Football Reference

LaVern Ralph "Lavvie" Dilweg (November 1, 1903 – January 2, 1968) was an American professional football player, attorney, and U.S. Congressman from Wisconsin.

== Football ==
Born and raised in Milwaukee, Dilweg attended its public schools and graduated from Washington High School. He enrolled at Marquette University in Milwaukee and played college football for the Golden Avalanche under head coach Frank Murray. A three-sport college athlete, he played center on the basketball team and was a shot putter on the track team. Dilweg was an All-American end, and played in the first East–West Shrine Game in San Francisco in late 1925. The Golden Avalanche had a record of 28–4–1 during Dilweg's four years.

After two undergraduate years at Marquette, Dilweg had enrolled in the MU law school, and was admitted to the Wisconsin Bar in 1927. While in law school in 1926, he played professionally for the Milwaukee Badgers, an NFL team in its fifth year that folded before the end of the season. While practicing law in Green Bay, he continued to play pro football, he signed with the Green Bay Packers in August 1927 and played through the 1934 season, with football in the morning and afternoons at the law office. Dilweg was recognized as one of the best ends in the NFL during the late 1920s and early 1930s and the Packers won three consecutive NFL championships in 1929, 1930, and 1931. Dilweg was a football official in the Big Ten Conference until his move to Washington, D.C. in early 1943.

Dilweg played in 107 games (out of a possible total of 113) while starting 72 of them. Records are incomplete, but they show Dilweg having 12 touchdowns with 23 receptions on 443 yards. Considered the best all-around end in pro football prior to Don Hutson, Dilweg was named to the NFL 1920s All-Decade Team, and is only one of two players on the list not in the Pro Football Hall of Fame. He was named consensus All-Pro for five consecutive years, with four of those years being unanimous All-Pro. In 2005, he was named to the Professional Football Researchers Association Hall of Very Good in the association's second HOVG class and his candidacy for induction into the Professional Football Hall of Fame is one of four candidacies that the PFRA officially supports. In 1970, he was inducted into the Green Bay Packers Hall of Fame.

== Political career ==
During World War II, Dilweg was elected to Congress in 1942 as a Democrat from the 8th district. He announced his candidacy in late July, less than four months before the election, and defeated incumbent Joshua Johns. He served in the 78th United States Congress (January 3, 1943 – January 3, 1945), but was not re-elected in 1944, defeated by John Byrnes, who went on to serve 28 years in the seat. Dilweg resumed the practice of law in Green Bay and Washington, and was confirmed as a member of the Foreign Claims Settlement Commission in 1961, appointed by President Kennedy.

== Death ==
Ill for several months after surgery, Dilweg was on vacation with his wife in Florida in early 1968 when he died in St. Petersburg, where they had been visiting friends. His death came just two days after the famous Ice Bowl game at Green Bay on New Year's Eve. Dilweg is interred at the Fort Howard Cemetery in Green Bay.

== Personal ==
Dilweg's wife, Eleanor Coleman Dilweg (1906–1978) was an Olympic swimmer from Milwaukee and a former world record holder. They met at Marquette, married in 1927, and had three sons. Son Gary (b. 1937) graduated from the U.S. Naval Academy and served in the U.S. Marines, and later in the Wisconsin legislature as a Republican from Green Bay.

Grandson Anthony Dilweg was an NFL quarterback from 1989 to 1991, with the Packers and Los Angeles Raiders. He played college football at Duke under head coach Steve Spurrier.

Dilweg was an initiated Freemason, Knight Templar and Shriner.

== Career statistics ==
=== NFL ===
Legend
	Won the NFL Championship
	Led the league
**Bold**	Career high

==== Regular season ====
Year	Team	Games		Receiving							Kicking	Scoring	
Year	Team	GP	GS	Rec	Yds	Y/R	Lng	TD	R/G	Y/G	XPM	IntTD	AllTD
1926	MIL	9	9	12	221	18.4		0	1.3	24.6	0	0	0
1927	GNB	10	10	16	254	15.9		1	1.6	25.4	0	**1**	2
1928	GNB	12	**12**	18	203	11.3		0	1.5	16.9	0	0	0
1929	GNB	13	9	**25**	**429**	17.2		3	**1.9**	**33.0**	0	0	3
1930	GNB	12	10	16	291	18.2		2	1.3	24.3	0	**1**	3
1931	GNB	**14**	10	7	201	**28.7**		**4**	.5	14.4	**1**	0	**4**
1932	GNB	**14**	4	5	83	16.6		0	.4	5.9	**1**	0	0
1933	GNB	11	6	13	225	17.3		0	1.2	20.5	0	0	0
1934	GNB	12	2	5	135	27.0	39	2	.4	11.3	0	0	2
Career		107	72	117	2,042	17.5	39	12	1.1	19.1	2	2	14

== See also ==
- List of United States representatives who served a single term

U.S. House of Representatives
Preceded by Joshua L. Johns	Member of the U.S. House of Representatives from Wisconsin's 8th congressional district January 3, 1943 – January 3, 1945	Succeeded by John W. Byrnes
