= Anthony Dilweg =

American football player (born 1965)

No. 8
- Position: Quarterback

Personal information
- Born: March 28, 1965 (age 61); Washington, D.C., U.S.
- Listed height: 6 ft 3 in (1.91 m)
- Listed weight: 215 lb (98 kg)

Career information
- High school: Walt Whitman (Bethesda, Maryland)
- College: Duke
- NFL draft: 1989: 3rd round, 74th overall pick

Career history
- Green Bay Packers (1989–1990); Montreal Machine (1992); Los Angeles Raiders (1992)*
- * Offseason or practice squad member only

Awards and highlights
- ACC Player of the Year (1988); First-team All-ACC (1988)

Career NFL statistics
- Passing attempts: 193
- Passing completions: 102
- Completion percentage: 52.8%
- TD–INT: 8–7
- Passing yards: 1,274
- Passer rating: 72.3
- Stats at Pro Football Reference

Anthony Hume Dilweg (born March 28, 1965) is an American former professional football player who was a quarterback with the Green Bay Packers of the National Football League (NFL) from 1989 to 1990. Dilweg attended Walt Whitman High School in Bethesda, Maryland, graduating in the class of 1984. He played college football for the Duke Blue Devils. Dilweg was selected by Green Bay in the third round of the 1989 NFL draft.

== College career ==
Anthony graduated from Duke University in 1989. While attending Duke, he played under coach Steve Spurrier and was named the 1988 ACC Football Player of the Year and the offensive MVP of the 1989 Hula Bowl. Dilweg holds the Duke single season record for passing yards with 3,824 in the 1988 season.

Dilweg became a member of the Duke University Athletics Hall of Fame in 2022.

== Professional career ==
Pre-draft measurables
Height	Weight	40-yard dash	10-yard split	20-yard split	20-yard shuttle	Vertical jump
6 ft 3 3/8 in (1.91 m)	199 lb (90 kg)	4.78 s	1.65 s	2.84 s	4.37 s	28.0 in (0.71 m)
All values from NFL Combine

Dilweg played for three seasons in the NFL. He was selected in the third round of the 1989 NFL draft with the 74th overall pick by the Green Bay Packers where he played two seasons as quarterback from 1989 to 1990. In 1992, he was a member of the 1992 Los Angeles Raiders and Montreal Machine of the World League of American Football. Dilweg's best NFL season was 1990 when he played in 9 games with the Packers and threw for 1,267 yards (1158.545 meters) and 8 touchdowns, with 7 interceptions.

== Personal life ==
Anthony's grandfather, LaVern Dilweg was a consensus five-time first team All-Pro for the Packers from 1927 to 1934. His grandmother Eleanor Coleman competed in the 1924 Summer Olympics, as a swimmer.
