= John B. Chase =

American politician

John B. Chase (October 7, 1872 - August 31, 1950) was an attorney who served as mayor of Oconto, Wisconsin and as a member of the Wisconsin State Senate.

== Biography ==
Chase was born on October 7, 1872, in Logansport, Indiana. He attended the University of Pennsylvania.

== Career ==
Chase, an adherent of progressive Senator Robert M. La Follette, defeated long-term incumbent state senator Timothy Burke in the 1924 Republican primary, and served as a member of the Senate from 1925 to 1928. Additionally, he was District Attorney of Oconto County, Wisconsin, City Attorney of Oconto, Wisconsin, Mayor of Oconto and Chairman of the Oconto County Republican Committee. Chase died in 1950.
