= Timothy Burke (politician) =

American politician (1866-1926)

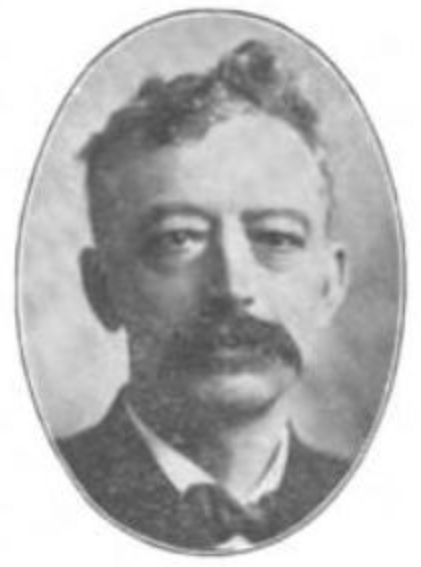

Member of the Wisconsin Senate from the 2nd district
- In office January 4, 1909 – January 5, 1925
- Preceded by: Henry F. Hagemeister
- Succeeded by: John B. Chase

Member of the Wisconsin State Assembly
- In office January 7, 1907 – January 4, 1909
- Preceded by: Willard Burdeau
- Succeeded by: Ferdinand Wittig
- Constituency: Brown 1st district
- In office January 7, 1895 – January 4, 1897
- Preceded by: Anton Van Der Heiden
- Succeeded by: John M. Hogan
- Constituency: Brown 2nd district

Sheriff of Brown County, Wisconsin
- In office January 1, 1901 – January 1, 1903
- Preceded by: Charles Prust
- Succeeded by: William A. Gauerke

Personal details
- Born: February 2, 1866 Morrison, Wisconsin, U.S.
- Died: December 31, 1926 (aged 60) Green Bay, Wisconsin, U.S.
- Resting place: Allouez Catholic Cemetery, Green Bay
- Party: Republican
- Spouse: Frances M. Burke
- Profession: Lawyer

Military service
- Allegiance: United States
- Branch/service: Wisconsin National Guard
- Years of service: 1917–1920
- Rank: Major
- Unit: 9th Reg. Wis. Infantry; Judge Advocate General's Corps

Timothy Burke (February 2, 1866 – December 31, 1926) was an American lawyer and Republican politician from Green Bay, Wisconsin. He served in the State Assembly for the 1895 and 1907 sessions, and represented Brown County in the Wisconsin Senate for 16 years (1909–1925).

== Biography ==
Burke was born on February 2, 1866, on a farm in the town of Morrison, Wisconsin. He initially worked as a teacher and farmer. He entered law school in 1897 and passed the bar exam in December that year. During the First World War he served in the Wisconsin State Guard. He died in Green Bay on December 31, 1926.

== Political career ==
Burke was a member of the assembly from 1895 to 1896, again from 1907 to 1908. In between tenures in the assembly, he was sheriff of Brown County, Wisconsin from 1901 until 1902. He became chairman of the Brown County Republican Party in 1904 and served until 1911, and served in the senate from 1909 to 1925. After his defeat in the 1924 Republican primary by John B. Chase, (an adherent of Senator Robert M. LaFollette), he returned to practicing law.

Wisconsin State Assembly
Preceded by Anton Van Der Heiden	Member of the Wisconsin State Assembly from the Brown 2nd district January 7, 1895 – January 4, 1897	Succeeded by John M. Hogan
Preceded by Willard Burdeau	Member of the Wisconsin State Assembly from the Brown 1st district January 7, 1907 – January 4, 1909	Succeeded by Ferdinand Wittig
Wisconsin Senate
Preceded by Henry F. Hagemeister	Member of the Wisconsin Senate from the 2nd district January 4, 1909 – January 5, 1925	Succeeded by John B. Chase
Legal offices
Preceded by Charles Prust	Sheriff of Brown County, Wisconsin; January 1, 1901 – January 1, 1903	Succeeded by William A. Gauerke
