= Edward Decker =

19th century American politician

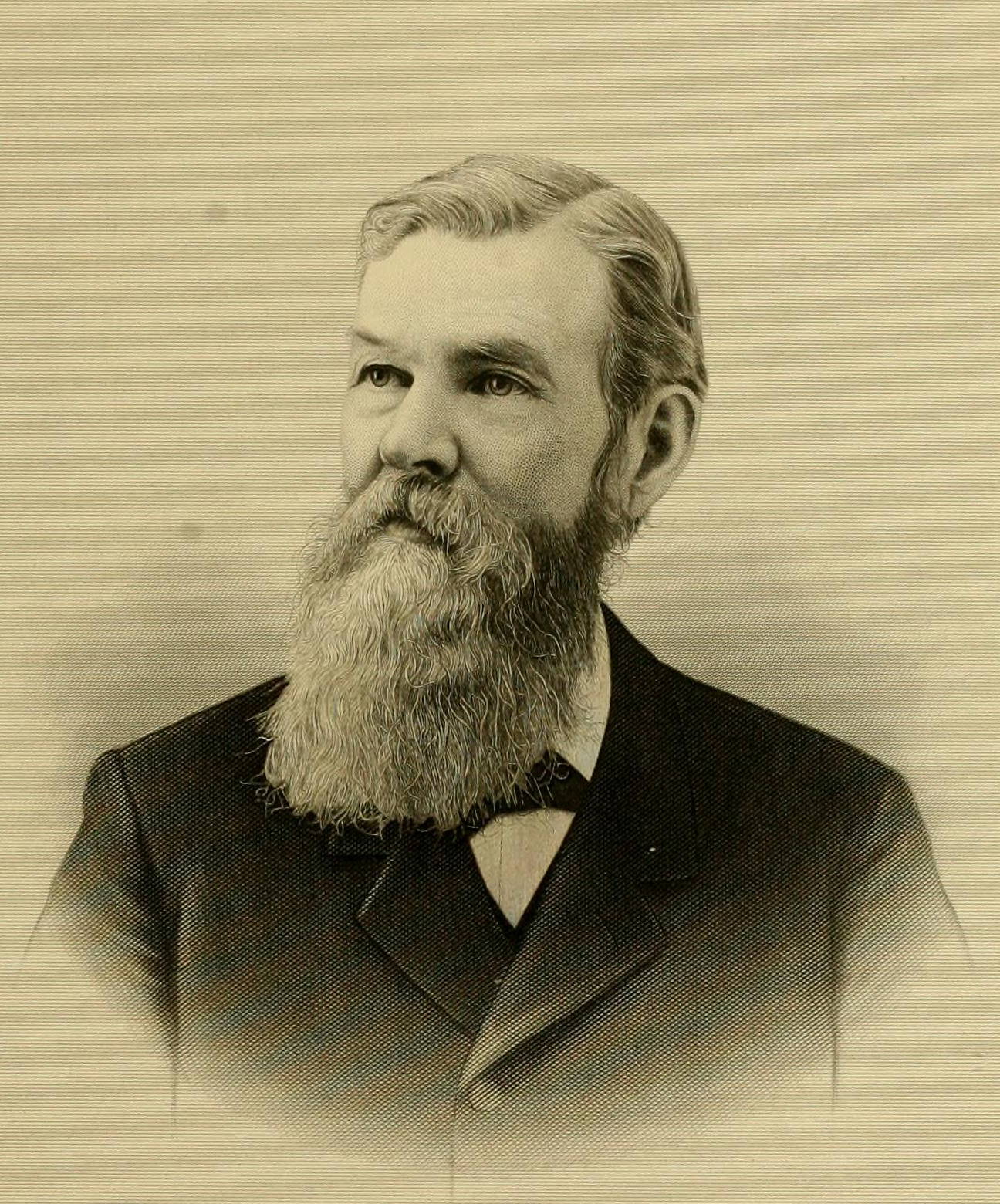
- From Commemorative Biographical Record of the Counties of Brown, Kewaunee, and Door, Wisconsin (1895)

Member of the Wisconsin Senate from the 2nd district
- In office January 2, 1860 – January 6, 1862
- Preceded by: Morgan Lewis Martin
- Succeeded by: Edward Hicks

County Clerk of Kewaunee County, Wisconsin
- In office January 3, 1859 – January 4, 1869
- Preceded by: John McNally
- Succeeded by: W. D. Hitchcock

Personal details
- Born: May 2, 1827 Casco, Maine, U.S.
- Died: July 9, 1911 (aged 84) Casco, Wisconsin, U.S.
- Resting place: Riverview Public Cemetery, Kewaunee, Wisconsin
- Party: Democratic
- Spouses: Dolly Anna Puffer (died 1861); Susan E. Decker (died 1868); Joanna Curtin (m. 1872; died 1880); Elizabeth Mallory (Walker) (m. 1880; died 1901)
- Children: with Dolly Puffer; George A. Decker^{(b. 1854; died 1886)}; with Susan Decker; Anna M. (Curtin)^{(b. 1862; died 1926)}; David B. Decker^{(b. 1863; died 1933)}; with Joanna Curtin; Edward F. Decker^{(b. 1873; died 1923)}; Nathan Decker^{(b. 1875; died 1907)}; with Elizabeth Walker; Libbie (Lawton)^{(b. 1881; died 1964)}
- Occupation: real estate dealer, banker, financier

Edward Decker (May 2, 1827 – July 9, 1911) was an American businessman, Democratic politician, and Wisconsin pioneer. He is known as the founder of Kewaunee County, Wisconsin, and was a member of the Wisconsin State Senate during the 1860 and 1861 sessions.

== Early life ==
Edward Decker was born in Casco, Maine, in May 1827. He had little formal education and went to work at age 14 in Portland, Maine. He moved to Boston two years later and worked as a clerk in a store owned by his uncle. While living in Boston, he heard tales of the opportunities in the Iowa Territory and traveled west in 1845. After landing in Milwaukee, he decided to remain in the Wisconsin Territory instead.

After a year living at Watertown, Wisconsin, he moved north to Oshkosh. There he became involved in the lumber industry and was the first man to run logs down the Wolf River to Oshkosh. He signed a contract with a saw mill operator on a Wolf River tributary to supply logs in exchange for half the lumber produced by the mill. He sold the lumber in Oshkosh and continued in the lumber business for three years. He then built and ran a hotel in the neighboring community of Menasha, which he operated for several years.

== Establishing Kewaunee County ==
In 1855, he sold all his interests in Winnebago County and moved east to Kewaunee County, which had just recently been established. He purchased a large amount of land in the new county with the intention of starting a community, which he named "Casco", after the town of his birth.

The county conducted its inaugural elections in 1856, but all of the elected officers were deemed unqualified for their offices, and the affairs of the county languished for much of 1857. In response, in the fall of that year, prominent businessmen and landowners in Kewaunee asked Decker to step in to organize the affairs of the county, specifically, he was deputized by the county clerk and treasurer to handle their affairs. His first action was to construct county offices in the town of Kewaunee. At the end of that term of office, he was elected to replace the county clerk in 1858 and was subsequently re-elected four more times, leaving office in January 1869.

While serving as clerk, he was also elected to a two-year term in the Wisconsin State Senate in the election of 1859. He represented Wisconsin's 2nd State Senate district, which then comprised the entire northeast quadrant of the state. He declined renomination in 1861.

During these years, he also brought the first printing press to Kewaunee County, which he used to begin the Kewaunee Enterprise, a Democratic partisan newspaper, which he sold to John Milton Read in 1869.

During the American Civil War, he served as deputy provost marshal for Kewaunee County. In these years, Kewaunee County had a large immigrant population that strongly resisted the new obligations levied by the war—including taxes and conscription. Through his efforts, however, Decker soothed their hostility and gained their compliance.

== Railroad and business career ==
After the war, Decker went into the railroad business with Charles D. Robinson and Anton Klaus to construct a line from Green Bay to Saint Paul, Minnesota. The project was slow to get started, and Decker decided to take more direct oversight in 1868, having himself named president and assuming oversight of the construction. However, shortly after starting this office, he was badly injured in an accident with a horse. The horse chewed his hand and arm, leaving it mangled, and trampled over him. He was confined to bed for weeks and his arm had to be completely amputated. In his absence, the route changed and terminated at Winona, Minnesota, instead of St. Paul.

In 1872, he relocated to Green Bay, Wisconsin, and purchased a controlling interest in the Bank of Commerce. He returned to Casco a few years later and became one of the main shareholders in the Kewaunee Exchange Bank, and was soon made president of the bank. He started another private bank in 1881, called the Bank of Ahnapee, using entirely his own capital. He then founded the Bank of Sturgeon Bay in 1888 in partnership with James Keogh, and was also president of that bank. In 1891, in partnership with his son, David, he organized the Bank of Two Rivers.

During these years, he also renewed his interest in the newspaper industry. He bought half ownership of the Green Bay Advocate in 1888, which he then incorporated as the Green Bay Advocate Company. He continued publishing the paper until 1901.

He made one final run for elected office in 1902, running as the Democratic candidate for Congress in Wisconsin's 9th congressional district, but fell far short of incumbent Republican Edward S. Minor.

He died at his home in Casco on July 9, 1911.

== Personal life and family ==
Edward Decker was the eldest son of David and Eliza (née Dunham) Decker. David Decker was a miller and merchant in Maine and followed his son west to Kewaunee County, Wisconsin, in 1857.

Edward Decker married four times and had at least six children. His first wife was Dolly Anna Puffer, with whom he had one son, George. She died in 1861, and he soon married Susan, who died in 1868. With Susan, he had two more children. He married his third wife, Joanna Curtin, in 1872, and had two more children before her death in 1880. That year, he married Elizabeth Mallory Walker, the widow of Charles H. Walker. They had one daughter together.

== Electoral history ==
=== U.S. House of Representatives (1902) ===
Wisconsin's 9th Congressional District Election, 1902
Party	Candidate	Votes	%	±%
General Election, November 4, 1902
Republican	Edward S. Minor	15,958	57.08%	−7.64%
Democratic	Edward Decker	11,479	41.06%	+8.09%
Prohibition	T. W. Lomas	518	1.85%	−0.45%
Plurality		4,479	16.02%	-15.73%
Total votes		27,955	100.0%	-45.73%
Republican hold				

Wisconsin Senate
Preceded by Morgan Lewis Martin	Member of the Wisconsin Senate from the 2nd district January 2, 1860 – January 6, 1862	Succeeded by Edward Hicks
Political offices
Preceded by John McNally	County Clerk of Kewaunee County, Wisconsin; January 3, 1859 – January 4, 1869	Succeeded by W. D. Hitchcock
