= Harold A. Lytie =

American politician

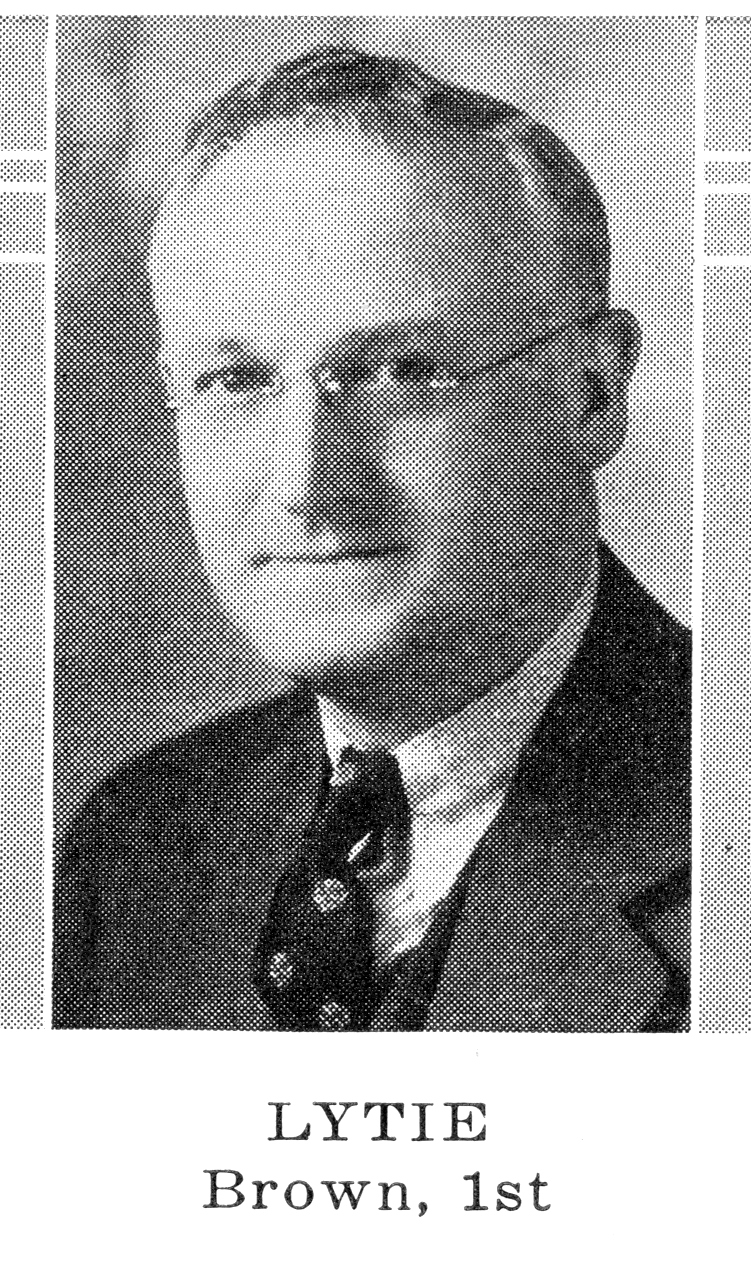

Member of the Wisconsin Senate from the 2nd district
- In office 1945–1949
- Preceded by: John W. Byrnes
- Succeeded by: Fred F. Kaftan

Member of the Wisconsin State Assembly from the Brown County district
- In office 1937–1942

Personal details
- Born: June 9, 1899 Portage County, Wisconsin
- Died: June 5, 1961 (aged 61) Green Bay, Wisconsin
- Party: Democratic
- Profession: Barber

Harold Antone Lytie (June 9, 1899, in Portage County, Wisconsin – June 5, 1961, in Green Bay, Wisconsin) was a member of the Wisconsin State Assembly and Wisconsin State Senate.

== Biography ==
Lytie was born on June 9, 1899, in Portage County, Wisconsin. He would become a barber.

== Political career ==
Lytie was a member of the Assembly from 1937 to 1942 and of the Senate from 1945 to 1948. Additionally, he was an unsuccessful candidate for the Senate in 1956 and 1960. He was a Democrat.
