= Thomas McGrath (Wisconsin politician) =

American politician (1859-1920)

T. J. McGrath

Member of the Wisconsin State Assembly from the Brown 1st district
- In office January 4, 1897 – January 7, 1901
- Preceded by: Henry F. Hagemeister
- Succeeded by: Willard Burdeau

Personal details
- Born: January 15, 1859 Victoria County, Canada West
- Died: January 29, 1920 (aged 61) Danville, Illinois, U.S.
- Resting place: Spring Hill Cemetery, Danville, Illinois
- Party: Republican
- Spouse: Eleanor Fuller
- Children: several
- Occupation: Laborer, contractor

Thomas Joseph McGrath (January 15, 1859 – January 29, 1920) was a Canadian American immigrant, contractor, and Republican politician. He was a member of the Wisconsin State Assembly, representing the city of Green Bay and northwest Brown County during the 1897 and 1899 sessions. His name was often abbreviated as T. J. McGrath.

== Biography ==
Thomas J. McGrath was born in Victoria County, Canada West, in January 1859. He was raised and educated there and emigrated to Wisconsin in December 1875. He lived in Waupaca County, Wisconsin, for two years, then moved to Minnesota in 1877, where he remained until 1888, working as a laborer and carpenter. In 1888 he moved to Green Bay, Wisconsin, where he operated as a general contractor for forty years.

He was active with the Republican Party of Wisconsin and was elected on the Republican ticket to the Wisconsin State Assembly in 1896. He represented Brown County's first Assembly district, which then comprised Green Bay and the northwest corner of the county. He went on to win re-election in 1898, serving in the 1897 and 1899 sessions of the Legislature.

He was one of the primary construction contractors on the building of the Green Bay Masonic Temple, now referred to as the Northeast Wisconsin Masonic Center and was active in Freemasonry.

He left Wisconsin in 1915, moving to Gordonsville, Virginia, and from there moved to Danville, Illinois, about 1918. He died at his home in Danville in January 1920.

== Electoral history ==
=== Wisconsin Assembly (1896, 1898) ===
Wisconsin Assembly, Brown 1st District Election, 1896
Party	Candidate	Votes	%	±%
General Election, November 3, 1896
Republican	Thomas J. McGrath	2,794	61.02%	+12.71%
Democratic	John E. Shaughnessy	1,724	37.65%	−14.05%
Prohibition	W. M. Ringsdorf	61	1.33%	
Plurality		1,070	23.37%	+19.98%
Total votes		4,579	100.0%	+32.76%
Republican gain from Democratic				

Wisconsin Assembly, Brown 1st District Election, 1898
Party	Candidate	Votes	%	±%
General Election, November 8, 1898
Republican	Thomas J. McGrath (incumbent)	1,923	56.34%	−4.67%
Democratic	Albert L. Gray	1,490	43.66%	+6.01%
Plurality		433	12.69%	-10.68%
Total votes		3,413	100.0%	-25.46%
Republican hold				

Wisconsin State Assembly
Preceded by Henry F. Hagemeister	Member of the Wisconsin State Assembly from the Brown 1st district January 4, 1897 – January 7, 1901	Succeeded by Willard Burdeau
