= Michael F. Kresky Jr. =

American politician

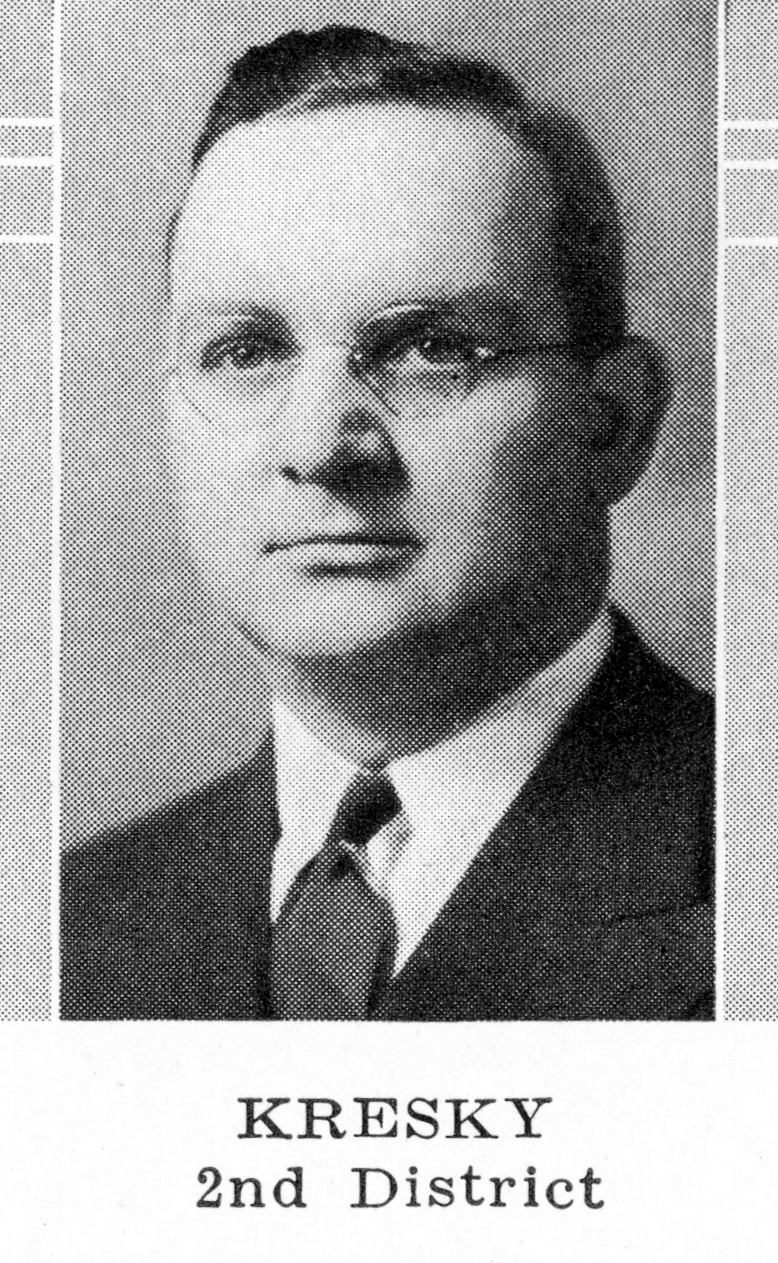
Michael F. Kresky, Jr.

Michael F. Kresky Jr. (May 23, 1904 – August 22, 1978) was a member of the Wisconsin State Senate from 1937 to 1939.

Born in Marinette, Wisconsin, Kresky graduated from Georgetown University Law School in 1931 and then practiced law in Green Bay, Wisconsin. In 1940, he was candidate for the United States House of Representatives from Wisconsin's 8th congressional district, losing to incumbent Joshua L. Johns. He was a member of the Wisconsin Progressive Party.
