= Charles W. Day =

American politician (1836–1906)

Charles West Day (July 1, 1836 – February 25, 1906) was an American lumberman, merchant, farmer, and politician.

Born in Jefferson County, New York, Day moved with his family to Wisconsin in 1849 and settled in Wrightstown, Brown County, Wisconsin. In 1884, Day moved his family to De Pere, Wisconsin. He was in the lumber business, merchant, and farmer In 1887, Day served in the Wisconsin State Senate and was a Republican.
