= Enos Warren Persons =

American businessman and politician

Enos Warren Persons (October 27, 1836 – February 13, 1899) was an American businessman and politician.

== Biography ==
Persons was born in Sheldon, New York and attended the Aurora Academy. In 1859, he moved to the town of Albany, Green County, Wisconsin. He then moved to Glenmore, Wisconsin and finally, in 1873, Persons moved to De Pere, Wisconsin. Persons was a grain dealer and owner of a general store. He served on the school board and on the Brown County Board of Supervisors.

In 1885 and 1886, he served in the Wisconsin State Assembly and was a Democrat. Between 1889 and 1893, Persons served in the Wisconsin State Senate. He died in Phoenix, Arizona Territory.
