= Joseph Wery =

American politician (1836–1907)

Joseph Wery (1836–1907) was a member of the Wisconsin State Assembly, elected in 1888. He represented Kewaunee in the Assembly. Other positions he held include Sheriff and member of the county board of Kewaunee County, Wisconsin. He was a Democrat.

Wery was born on September 29, 1836, in Belgium. He married Adolphine M.(1844–1920). Wery died October 24, 1907, in Champion, Wisconsin and was buried in Bay View, Kewaunee County, Wisconsin.
