= 53rd Wisconsin Legislature =

Wisconsin legislative term for 1917–1918

←	52nd	54th	→
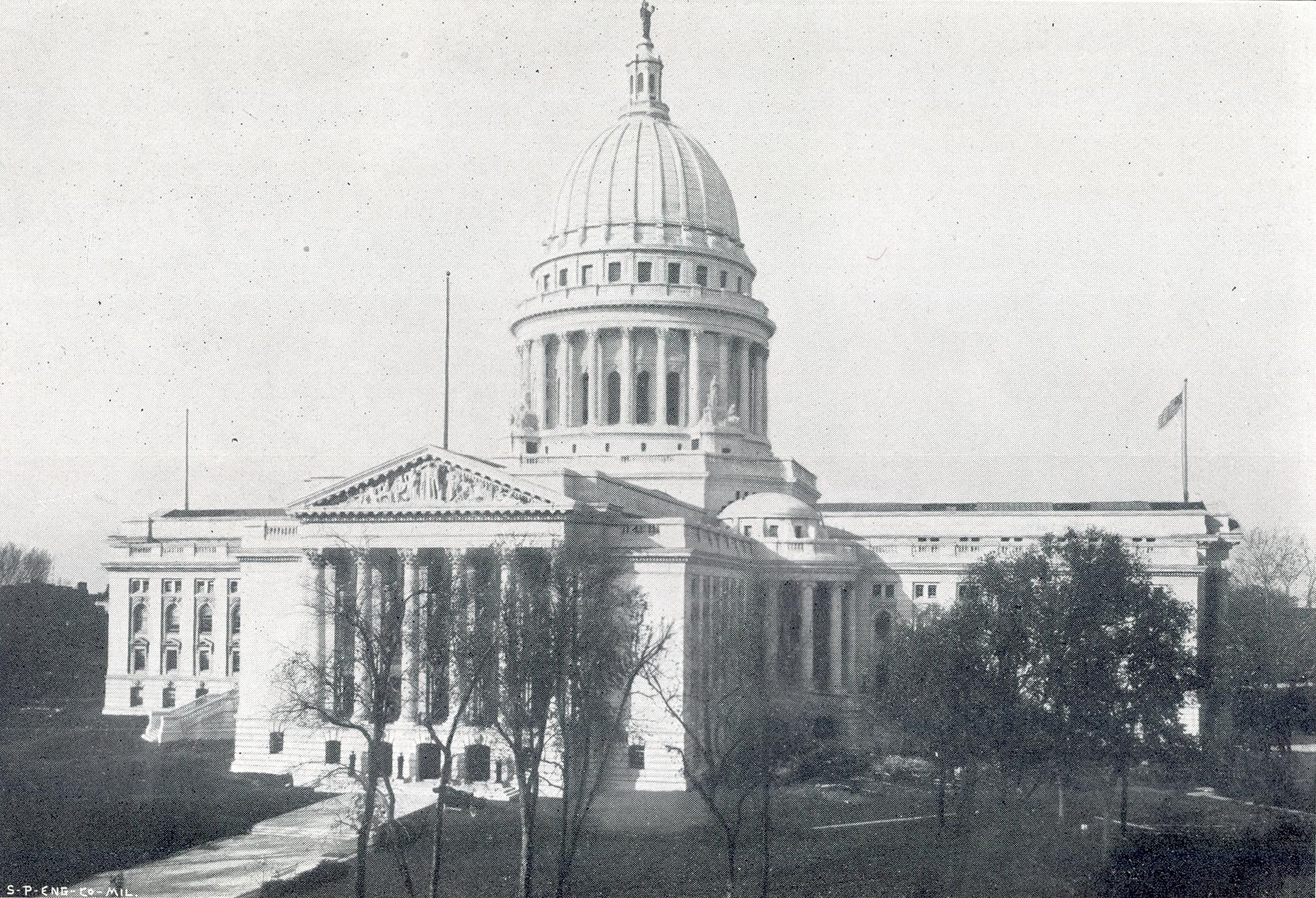
- Wisconsin State Capitol ca.1915

Overview
- Legislative body: Wisconsin Legislature
- Meeting place: Wisconsin State Capitol
- Term: January 1, 1917 – January 6, 1919
- Election: November 7, 1916

Senate
- Members: 33
- Senate President: Edward Dithmar (R)
- President pro tempore: Timothy Burke (R)
- Party control: Republican

Assembly
- Members: 100
- Assembly Speaker: Lawrence C. Whittet (R)
- Party control: Republican

Sessions
- Regular: January 10, 1917 – July 16, 1917

Special sessions
- Feb. 1918 Spec.: February 19, 1918 – March 9, 1918
- Sep. 1918 Spec.: September 24, 1918 – September 25, 1918

The Fifty-Third Wisconsin Legislature convened from January 10, 1917, to July 16, 1917, in regular session, and re-convened in two special sessions in February and September 1918.

During this session, the new Wisconsin State Capitol was completed after 13 years of reconstruction following the 1904 fire. The official dedication ceremony was postponed until the end of World War I.

Senators representing even-numbered districts were newly elected for this session and were serving the first two years of a four-year term. Assembly members were elected to a two-year term. Assembly members and even-numbered senators were elected in the general election of November 7, 1916. Senators representing odd-numbered districts were serving the third and fourth year of a four-year term, having been elected in the general election of November 3, 1914.

The governor of Wisconsin during this entire term was Republican Emanuel L. Philipp, of Milwaukee County, serving his second two-year term, having won re-election in the 1916 Wisconsin gubernatorial election.

== Major events ==
- January 11, 1917: The Kingsland explosion destroyed approximately 500,000 rounds of artillery ammunition in Lyndhurst, New Jersey.
- February 1, 1917: The German Empire announced that it would resume unrestricted submarine warfare, rescinding the Sussex pledge.
- February 3, 1917: The United States severed diplomatic relations with Germany.
- February 24, 1917: British intelligence shared the Zimmermann Telegram with American Ambassador Walter Hines Page, in which the German Empire proposed a military alliance with Mexico if the United States entered the war against Germany.
- March 4, 1917: Second inauguration of President Woodrow Wilson.
- March 15, 1917: Following the February Revolution, Tsar Nicholas II abdicated his throne, bringing an end to the Russian Empire.
- April 3, 1917: Walter C. Owen was elected justice of the Wisconsin Supreme Court, defeating incumbent justice Roujet D. Marshall.
- April 6, 1917: The United States declared war on the German Empire, beginning their active participation in World War I.
- April 26, 1917: The Wisconsin Senate voted to expel senator Frank Raguse after he refused to affirm his allegiance to the United States. Raguse remains the only member of the Wisconsin State Legislature to have been expelled.
- May 18, 1917: U.S. President Woodrow Wilson signed the Selective Service Act of 1917, giving the president the power of conscription.
- June 15, 1917: U.S. President Woodrow Wilson signed the Espionage Act of 1917, to prevent interference with U.S. war activities or promoting the interests of U.S. war opponents.
- July 18, 1917: Regiments of the Wisconsin National Guard were activated and organized into the 32nd Infantry Division for federal service.
- October 6, 1917: The first University of Wisconsin football game to be played at Camp Randall Stadium.
- October 21, 1917: Wisconsin's junior United States senator, Paul O. Husting, died in a hunting accident.
- November 7, 1917: Amidst the October Revolution in Russia, workers stormed the Winter Palace and destroyed the Russian Provisional Government, triggering the Russian Civil War.
- November 24, 1917: A bomb killed 9 members of the Milwaukee Police Department in the most deadly single incident for American police until the September 11 attacks of 2001.
- January 1918: First known cases of Spanish flu were observed in Haskell County, Kansas.
- March 3, 1918: The Treaty of Brest-Litovsk was signed between the Russian Soviet Federative Socialist Republic and the Central Powers, ending Russia's involvement in World War I.
- April 2, 1918: Irvine Lenroot was elected United States senator from Wisconsin in a special election.
- May 18, 1918: Wisconsin's mobilized regiments in the 32nd Infantry Division arrived at the western front of World War I and continued on the line until the end of the war.
- November 5, 1918: Emanuel L. Philipp was re-elected Governor of Wisconsin, his third term.
- November 9, 1918: Kaiser Wilhelm II abdicated his throne, ending the German Empire. The German Republic was proclaimed as successor state.
- November 11, 1918: The German Republic agreed to an armistice with the Entente, effectively ending major combat in World War I.
- December 4, 1918: U.S. President Woodrow Wilson departed to attend the Paris Peace Conference, becoming the first sitting U.S. president to visit Europe.

== Major legislation ==
- 1917 Joint Resolution 20: Joint Resolution to amend sections 6 and 7, of article VII, of the constitution of the state of Wisconsin, relating to circuit judges, 1917 Joint Resolution 20. First legislative passage of a proposed amendment to the constitution to allow the legislature to reduce the number of judicial circuits and assign multiple judges to single circuits.
- 1917 Joint Resolution 23: Joint Resolution to amend section 21 of article IV of the constitution, relating to compensation of members of the legislature, 1917 Joint Resolution 23. First legislative passage of a proposted amendment to allow legislative salaries to be set by law, rather than fixed by the constitution.
- 1917 Joint Resolution 24: Joint Resolution to provide for the appointment of a joint committee of the legislature to investigate the subject of "Social Insurance", 1917 Joint Resolution 24.

== Party summary ==
=== Senate summary ===
Senate partisan composition Democratic: 6 seats Social Dem.: 3 seats Republican: 24 seats

	Party (Shading indicates majority caucus)			Total	
	Dem.	S.D.	Rep.	Total	Vacant
End of previous Legislature	9	1	20	30	3
Start of 1st Session	6	3	24	33	0
From April 27, 1917 (Note: Socialist Frank Raguse (District 8) was expelled after refusing to sign a statement affirming his allegiance to the United States.)	6	2	24	32	1
Final voting share	25%		75%		
Beginning of the next Legislature	2	4	27	33	0

=== Assembly summary ===
Assembly partisan composition Democratic: 14 seats Social Dem.: 7 seats Republican: 79 seats

	Party (Shading indicates majority caucus)			Total	
	Dem.	S.D.	Rep.	Total	Vacant
End of previous Legislature	29	8	63	100	0
Start of 1st Session	13	7	80	100	0
From Feb. 14, 1917 (Note: Republican Isaac J. Kvam (Barron County) died February 14, 1917.)	13	7	79	99	1
From Apr. 10, 1917 (Note: Democrat Charles A. Beggs (Barron County) was sworn in to replace Isaac J. Kvam on April 10, 1917.)	14	7	79	100	0
From July 1, 1917 (Note: Republican Edward A. Everett (Iron & Vilas counties) resigned.)	14	7	78	99	1
From Dec. 10, 1917 (Note: Democrat William Arnemann (Winnebago County) died.)	13	7	78	98	2
From Dec. 25, 1917 (Note: Republican D. S. Burnett (Marathon County) resigned.)	13	7	77	97	3
From Jan. 3, 1918 (Note: Democrat Carl Hansen (Manitowoc County) died.)	12	7	77	96	4
From Feb. 19, 1918 (Note: Democrat Walter Wittman (Manitowoc County), Socialist Herman Marth (Marathon County), and Republicans Griffith Thomas (Iron & Vilas counties) and Publius Lawson (Winnebago County), were sworn in to fill vacancies.)	13	8	79	100	0
Final voting share	21%		79%		
Beginning of the next Legislature	6	16	78	100	0

== Sessions ==
- Regular session: January 10, 1917 – July 16, 1917
- February 1918 special session: February 19, 1918 – March 9, 1918
- September 1918 special session: September 24, 1918 – September 25, 1918

== Leaders ==
=== Senate leadership ===
- President of the Senate: Edward Dithmar (R)
- President pro tempore: Timothy Burke (R–Green Bay)

=== Assembly leadership ===
- Speaker of the Assembly: Lawrence C. Whittet (R–Edgerton)

== Members ==
=== Members of the Senate ===
Members of the Senate for the Fifty-Third Wisconsin Legislature:

Senate partisan representation Democratic: 6 seats Social Dem.: 3 seats Republican: 24 seats

Dist.	Counties	Senator	Residence	Party
01	Door, Kewaunee, & Marinette	M. W. Perry	Algoma	Rep.
02	Brown & Oconto	Timothy Burke	Green Bay	Rep.
03	Kenosha & Racine	Charles H. Everett	Racine	Rep.
04	Milwaukee (Northern Part)	Herman C. Schultz	Milwaukee	Rep.
05	Milwaukee (Middle-West County & Central-Western City)	H. O. Reinnoldt	Milwaukee	Rep.
06	Milwaukee (Northern City)	W. C. Zumach	Milwaukee	Soc.D.
07	Milwaukee (Southern County)	Louis A. Arnold	Milwaukee	Soc.D.
08	Milwaukee (City South)	Frank Raguse (expelled April 27, 1917)	Milwaukee	Soc.D.
08	Milwaukee (City South)	--Vacant from April 27, 1917--		
09	Milwaukee (City Downtown)	David V. Jennings	Milwaukee	Dem.
10	Buffalo, Pepin, Pierce, & St. Croix	George B. Skogmo	River Falls	Rep.
11	Burnett, Douglas, & Washburn	Fred A. Baxter	Superior	Rep.
12	Ashland, Bayfield, Price, Rusk, & Sawyer	A. H. Wilkinson	Bayfield	Rep.
13	Dodge & Washington	Byron Barwig	Mayville	Dem.
14	Outagamie & Shawano	Antone Kuckuk	Shawano	Rep.
15	Calumet & Manitowoc	Henry Rollmann	Chilton	Dem.
16	Crawford, Grant, & Richland	Henry E. Roethe	Fennimore	Rep.
17	Green, Iowa, & Lafayette	Platt Whitman	Highland	Rep.
18	Fond du Lac & Green Lake	Albert J. Pullen	North Fond du Lac	Rep.
19	Winnebago	William M. Bray	Oshkosh	Rep.
20	Ozaukee & Sheboygan	Theodore Benfey	Sheboygan	Rep.
21	Adams, Juneau, Marquette, & Waushara	Frank H. Hanson	Mauston	Rep.
22	Rock & Walworth	Lawrence E. Cunningham	Beloit	Rep.
23	Portage & Waupaca	Andrew R. Potts	Dayton	Rep.
24	Clark & Wood	Isaac P. Witter	Grand Rapids	Rep.
25	Langlade & Marathon	W. W. Albers	Wausau	Dem.
26	Dane	Henry Huber	Stoughton	Rep.
27	Columbia & Sauk	George Staudenmayer	Caledonia	Dem.
28	Chippewa, & Eau Claire	Roy P. Wilcox	Eau Claire	Rep.
29	Barron, Dunn, & Polk	Algodt C. Anderson	Menomonie	Rep.
30	Florence, Forest, Iron, Lincoln, Oneida, Taylor, & Vilas	Willard T. Stevens	Rhinelander	Rep.
31	Jackson, Monroe, & Vernon	J. Henry Bennett	Viroqua	Rep.
32	La Crosse & Trempealeau	Eugene F. Clark	Galesville	Rep.
33	Jefferson & Waukesha	Charles Mulberger	Watertown	Dem.

=== Members of the Assembly ===
Members of the Assembly for the Fifty-Third Wisconsin Legislature:

Assembly partisan composition Democratic: 14 seats Social Dem.: 7 seats Republican: 79 seats

Milwaukee County districts

Senate Dist.	County	Dist.	Representative	Party	Residence
21	Adams & Marquette		Alan Galbraith	Rep.	Friendship
12	Ashland		John C. Chapple	Rep.	Ashland
29	Barron		Isaac J. Kvam (died Feb. 14, 1917)	Rep.	Rice Lake
29	Barron		C. A. Beggs (from Apr. 10, 1917)	Dem.	Rice Lake
12	Bayfield		Walter A. Duffy	Rep.	
02	Brown	1	Nicholas Feldhausen	Dem.	Green Bay
02	Brown	2	Henry J. Janssen	Dem.	De Pere
10	Buffalo & Pepin		Frank Schaettle	Rep.	Mondovi
11	Burnett & Washburn		James H. Jensen	Rep.	Grantsburg
15	Calumet		Otto Luehrs	Rep.	Charlestown
28	Chippewa		Western Woodard	Rep.	Bloomer
24	Clark		William L. Smith	Rep.	Neillsville
27	Columbia		W. R. Chipman	Rep.	Leeds
16	Crawford		O. P. Vaughan	Rep.	Wauzeka
26	Dane	1	William T. Evjue	Rep.	Madison
26	Dane	2	James C. Hanson	Rep.	Christiana
26	Dane	3	Homer A. Stone	Rep.	Fitchburg
13	Dodge	1	Edmund J. Labuwi	Rep.	Neosho
13	Dodge	2	Samuel R. Webster	Rep.	Elba
01	Door		Frank N. Graass	Rep.	
11	Douglas	1	R. H. Bradley	Rep.	Superior
11	Douglas	2	J. W. Conner	Rep.	
29	Dunn		Carl Pieper	Rep.	Menomonie
28	Eau Claire		C. N. Saugen	Rep.	Pleasant Valley
30	Florence, Forest, & Oneida		Arthur M. Rogers	Rep.	Ross
18	Fond du Lac	1	Herman Schroeder	Rep.	Empire
18	Fond du Lac	2	John E. Johnson	Rep.	Brandon
16	Grant	1	Benjamin Webster	Rep.	Platteville
16	Grant	2	John J. Ruka	Rep.	Boscobel
17	Green		S. A. Schindler	Rep.	New Glarus
18	Green Lake		Newcomb Spoor	Rep.	Berlin
17	Iowa		John T. Williams	Rep.	Dodgeville
30	Iron & Vilas		Edward A. Everett (res. July 1, 1917)	Rep.	Eagle River
30	Iron & Vilas		Griffith Thomas (from Feb. 19, 1918)	Rep.	Hurley
31	Jackson		Peter A. Hemmy	Rep.	Alma
33	Jefferson	1	H. J. Grell	Rep.	Johnson Creek
33	Jefferson	2	William Everson	Dem.	Lake Mills
21	Juneau		George Frohmader	Rep.	Camp Douglas
03	Kenosha		Edward J. Vincent	Rep.	
01	Kewaunee		William H. O'Brien	Dem.	Franklin
32	La Crosse	1	Carl Kurtenacker	Rep.	La Crosse
32	La Crosse	2	Henry Freehoff	Rep.	Greenfield
17	Lafayette		Julius M. Engebretson	Rep.	Wiota
25	Langlade		Edward Nordman	Dem.	Polar
30	Lincoln		Robert Kleinschmidt	Rep.	Corning
15	Manitowoc	1	Carl Hansen (died Jan. 3, 1918)	Dem.	Manitowoc
15	Manitowoc	1	Walter Wittman (from Feb. 19, 1918)	Dem.	Manitowoc
15	Manitowoc	2	Martin Rappel	Dem.	Rockland
25	Marathon	1	Herman Hedrich	Rep.	Holton
25	Marathon	2	D. S. Burnett (res. Dec. 25, 1917)	Rep.	
25	Marathon	2	Herman Marth (from Feb. 19, 1918)	Soc.	Wausau
01	Marinette		F. N. Bernardy	Rep.	
09	Milwaukee	1	Ben H. Mahon	Rep.	Milwaukee
09	Milwaukee	2	William A. Campbell	Rep.	Milwaukee
09	Milwaukee	3	John P. Donnelly	Dem.	Milwaukee
05	Milwaukee	4	Henry Ohl Jr.	Soc.	Milwaukee
08	Milwaukee	5	Gilbert Poor	Soc.	Milwaukee
05	Milwaukee	6	Charles Schiewitz	Rep.	Milwaukee
05	Milwaukee	7	Bernhard Gettelman	Rep.	Milwaukee
08	Milwaukee	8	Frank Kubatzki	Dem.	Milwaukee
06	Milwaukee	9	Herman O. Kent	Soc.	Milwaukee
04	Milwaukee	10	Glenn P. Turner	Soc.	Milwaukee
08	Milwaukee	11	William E. Jordan	Soc.	Milwaukee
08	Milwaukee	12	William L. Smith	Soc.	Milwaukee
04	Milwaukee	13	Hugo Jeske	Rep.	Milwaukee
07	Milwaukee	14	Thomas Szewczykowski	Dem.	Milwaukee
05	Milwaukee	15	Theodore Engel	Rep.	Milwaukee
05	Milwaukee	16	William A. Schroeder	Rep.	Wauwatosa
07	Milwaukee	17	Frank Metcalfe	Soc.	Milwaukee
04	Milwaukee	18	Arnold C. Otto	Rep.	Milwaukee
07	Milwaukee	19	Delbert Miller	Rep.	West Allis
31	Monroe		Miles Hineman	Rep.	Tomah
02	Oconto		Albert Marlett	Rep.	
14	Outagamie	1	Herman W. Wieckert	Dem.	
14	Outagamie	2	Thomas W. Armstrong	Rep.	Kaukauna
20	Ozaukee		Eugene J. Poole	Dem.	Cedarburg
10	Pierce		Charles E. Hanson	Rep.	River Falls
29	Polk		Carl B. Casperson	Rep.	Laketown
23	Portage		George D. Whiteside	Rep.	Plover
12	Price		Hugo Kandutsch	Rep.	Kennan
03	Racine	1	John Dixon	Rep.	Racine
03	Racine	2	P. Walter Petersen	Rep.	Racine
28	Richland		John C. Anderson	Rep.	Cazenovia
22	Rock	1	Lawrence C. Whittet	Rep.	Edgerton
22	Rock	2	Charles D. Rosa	Rep.	Beloit
12	Rusk & Sawyer		V. V. Miller	Rep.	Grant
27	Sauk		George Carpenter	Rep.	Baraboo
14	Shawano		J. H. Van Doren	Rep.	Birnamwood
20	Sheboygan	1	John J. Koepsell	Rep.	Sheboygan
20	Sheboygan	2	R. B. Melvin	Rep.	
10	St. Croix		John A. Chinnock	Rep.	Hudson
30	Taylor		John Gamper	Rep.	Medford
32	Trempealeau		John F. Hager	Rep.	Whitehall
31	Vernon		Clarence H. Carter	Rep.	
23	Walworth		Riley S. Young	Rep.	Darien
13	Washington		Jacob J. Aulenbacher	Rep.	Richfield
33	Waukesha	1	John F. Buckley	Rep.	Waukesha
33	Waukesha	2	W. H. Edwards	Rep.	Sussex
23	Waupaca		Fred Hess	Rep.	Clintonville
21	Waushara		F. M. Clark	Rep.	Wild Rose
19	Winnebago	1	Martin T. Battis	Rep.	Oshkosh
19	Winnebago	2	William Arnemann (died Dec. 10, 1917)	Dem.	Neenah
19	Winnebago	2	Publius Lawson (from Feb. 19, 1918)	Rep.	Menasha
19	Winnebago	3	Charles F. Hart	Rep.	Oshkosh
24	Wood		Byron Whittingham	Rep.	Arpin

== Committees ==
=== Senate committees ===
- Senate Standing Committee on Committees – M. W. Perry, chair
- Senate Standing Committee on Contingent Expenditures – C. H. Everett, chair
- Senate Standing Committee on Corporations – W. M. Bray, chair
- Senate Standing Committee on Education and Public Welfare – M. W. Perry, chair
- Senate Standing Committee on the Judiciary – J. H. Bennett, chair
- Senate Standing Committee on Legislative Procedure – T. Burke, chair
- Senate Standing Committee on State Affairs – W. T. Stevens, chair
- Senate Special Committee on Conservation – F. H. Hanson, chair
- Senate Special Committee on Highways – L. E. Cunningham, chair

=== Assembly committees ===
- Assembly Standing Committee on Agriculture – H. J. Grell, chair
- Assembly Standing Committee on Commerce and Manufactures – C. F. Hart, chair
- Assembly Standing Committee on Contingent Expenditures – R. B. Melvin, chair
- Assembly Standing Committee on Education – S. A. Schindler, chair
- Assembly Standing Committee on Elections – G. Carpenter, chair
- Assembly Standing Committee on Engrossed Bills – W. R. Chipman, chair
- Assembly Standing Committee on Enrolled Bills – H. Freehoff, chair
- Assembly Standing Committee on Excise and Fees – J. M. Engebretson, chair
- Assembly Standing Committee on Fish and Game – J. A. Chinnock, chair
- Assembly Standing Committee on Insurance and Banking – J. C. Chapple, chair
- Assembly Standing Committee on the Judiciary – A. C. Otto, chair
- Assembly Standing Committee on Labor – D. J. Vincent, chair
- Assembly Standing Committee on Municipalities – J. Dixon, chair
- Assembly Standing Committee on Printing – C. Pieper, chair
- Assembly Standing Committee on Public Welfare – G. D. Whiteside, chair
- Assembly Standing Committee on Revision – C. S. Schiewitz, chair
- Assembly Standing Committee on Rules – E. A. Everett, chair
- Assembly Standing Committee on State Affairs – J. Gamper, chair
- Assembly Standing Committee on Taxation – W. H. Edwards, chair
- Assembly Standing Committee on Third Reading – J. J. Aulenbacher, chair
- Assembly Standing Committee on Transportation – B. Webster, chair

=== Joint committees ===
- Joint Standing Committee on Finance – P. Whitman (Sen.) & E. A. Everett (Asm.), co-chairs

== Employees ==
=== Senate employees ===
- Chief Clerk: Oliver G. Munson
  - Assistant Chief Clerk: C. E. Mullen
  - Journal Clerk: James B. Ackley
  - Bookkeeper: Carle E. Dietze
  - Index Clerk: Don E. Mowry
  - Enrolling Clerk: J. K. Kidder
  - Revision Clerk: D. J. Hotchkiss
  - Clerk of the Committee on Corporations: A. C. Miller
  - Clerk of the Committee on Education and Public Welfare: R. H. Hillyer
  - Clerk of the Committee on Finance: Arthur F. Steffen
  - Clerk of the Committee on the Judiciary: L. G. Vogt
  - Clerk of the Committee on State Affairs: A. A. Heinrich
  - Stenographers:
    - L. Schwartz
    - J. W. Leonard
  - Typists:
    - C. L. Cass
    - R. L. Jacobson
  - Mailing Clerk: E. G. Cooper
- Sergeant-at-Arms: F. E. Andrews
  - Assistant Sergeant-at-Arms: John J. Knudsen
  - Document Clerk: Emil Hartman
  - Day Police: Albert Daley
  - Night Police: Arlie M. Mucks
  - Gallery Police: Herman A. Degner
  - Night Laborers:
    - Thomas R. Foulkes
    - Ernest W. Rehnstrand
- Postmaster: Frank E. Riley
  - Messengers:
    - Paul W. Dietz
    - Robert Kilgust
    - Earl L. Marsh
    - Robert A. Cobban
    - John Lorigan
    - Ivan P. Donaghey
    - Glen A. Buerke
    - Lloyd B. Cain

=== Assembly employees ===
- Chief Clerk: C. E. Shaffer
  - Journal Clerk: W. W. Jones
    - Assistant Journal Clerk: J. S. Miller
  - Bookkeeper: W. J. Goldschmidt
    - Assistant Bookkeeper: J. C. Hawker
  - General Clerks:
    - W. F. Bart
    - L. J. Federer
  - Index Clerk: Edwin M. Johnson
  - Proofreaders and Enrolling Clerks:
    - Geo. F. Sharpe
    - Edward Oakey
  - Mailing Clerk: Edwin L. Shaffer
  - Stenographers:
    - Alvah V. Gruhn
    - L. M. Mielke
    - Emil Lusthaus
    - H. J. Campaign
    - N. E. Lummerding
    - P. J. Knippel
    - Victor Gilbertson
    - William L. Wollin
    - O. B. Lovell
    - Earl L. Dole
    - Joseph Entringer Jr.
    - Warren H. Schwartz
  - Typists:
    - L. L. Oeland
    - H. S. Belowsky
- Sergeant-at-Arms: Thomas Grant Cretney
  - Assistant Sergeant-at-Arms: Ernest F. Wright
  - Document Room Custodian: Helmer O. Femrite
    - Assistant Document Room Custodian: John D. Morner
  - Floor Police: Peter Duex
  - Cloak Room Attendant: John Holm
  - Gallery Police:
    - C. H. Sanderson
    - A. H. Emerson
  - Night Laborer: Hilding E. Anderson
  - Night Watch: Elmer R. Meacham
- Postmaster: Clarence O. Livermore
  - Post Office Messenger: Marshall M. Arnold
  - Messengers:
    - Helmer Hembre
    - Burr C. Wilcox
    - B. J. Glass
    - William Crapser
    - Austin Johnson
    - Leo Levenick
    - Isadore Perstein
    - Casper Jaquish
    - Orville Radke
    - Henry Royce
    - C. H. Meister
    - Carl Isaacson
    - Arthur Thorpe Jones
    - Ray J. Carey
