= Western Woodard =

20th century American politician

W. Woodard

Member of the Wisconsin State Assembly from the Chippewa County district
- In office January 4, 1915 – January 6, 1919
- Preceded by: Thomas W. Bartingale
- Succeeded by: Thomas W. Bartingale

Personal details
- Born: April 6, 1857 Jackson County, Wisconsin, U.S.
- Died: April 19, 1944 (aged 87) Woodmohr, Wisconsin, U.S.
- Resting place: Bloomer City Cemetery, Bloomer, Wisconsin
- Party: Republican
- Spouse: Alice (died 1945)
- Children: 2
- Occupation: Farmer

Western Woodard (April 6, 1857 – April 19, 1944) was an American sheep farmer and Republican politician from Chippewa County, Wisconsin. He was a member of the Wisconsin State Assembly during the 1915 and 1917 sessions. The town of Woodmohr, Wisconsin, was named in his honor.

== Biography ==
Western Woodard was born April 6, 1857, near Melrose, Wisconsin. As a child, he moved with his family to a farm outside the village of Bloomer, in Chippewa County, Wisconsin. For several years, he was employed as foreman of the Mississippi River Lumber Company's logging operations on the Chippewa River, where his father worked as a contractor for the company. He also operated his own farm, specializing in pure bred sheep.

He became involved in local politics with the Republican Party of Wisconsin, and was elected chairman of the town of Bloomer, and also served at least four years as chairman of the Chippewa County Board of Supervisors.

In 1914, he ran for the Republican nomination for Wisconsin State Assembly in the Chippewa County district, launching a primary challenge against Republican incumbent Thomas W. Bartingale, and prevailed with 58% of the vote in the primary, and went on to defeat Democrat Otto Friege in the 1914 general election. He was re-elected in 1916, but in 1918, he faced another primary against his 1914 opponent, Thomas W. Bartingale. This time Bartingale prevailed, and went on to succeed Woodard in the 54th Legislature.

== Personal life and family ==
Woodard's father, Thomas C. Woodard, was an enlisted volunteer in the Union Army through most of the American Civil War. He was promoted to the rank of sergeant, serving in Company F of the 25th Wisconsin Infantry Regiment, and witnessed the surrender of Robert E. Lee.

Woodard died at his home in the town of Woodmohr, Wisconsin, on April 19, 1944. He was survived by his wife, Alice, and one son.

Wisconsin State Assembly
Preceded by Thomas W. Bartingale	Member of the Wisconsin State Assembly from the Chippewa County district January 4, 1915 – January 6, 1919	Succeeded by Thomas W. Bartingale
