= Richard Bradley =

Richard Bradley may refer to:

- Richard Bradley (archaeologist) (born 1946), British archaeologist
- Richard Bradley (botanist) (1688–1732), English botanist
- Richard Bradley (film producer) (born 1949), Australian film producer and publicist
- Richard Bradley (British TV producer) (born 1961), British TV producer known for documentaries and Horrible Histories
- Richard Bradley (British TV director) (born 1960), British TV director known for children's programmes including Teletubbies
- Rich Bradley (born 1955), American politician
- Richard Bradley (writer) (born 1964), American writer
- Richard H. Bradley, American developer
- Richard Bradley (racing driver) (born 1991), British racing driver
- R. H. Bradley (1873–?), Canadian-born American politician
- Richard Bradley (philosopher) (born 1964), South African philosopher
