= The Mighty Bulldogs =

Documentary about the Bulldogs, a Sydney rugby team

- Front cover of DVD jacket for volume 2
- Directed by: Richard Bradley
- Country of origin: Australia

Production
- Executive producer: Phil Pellizzeri
- Producer: Richard Bradley
- Cinematography: Chris Maguire, Mark Revello, Jack Wilson
- Editors: Richard Bradley, Ben Broad, Frame Set and Match
- Running time: 12 hours in 4 parts
- Production company: Richard Bradley Productions

Original release
- Release: December 2007 – 2010

The Mighty Bulldogs is an Australian social and sporting history DVD series about the Canterbury-Bankstown District Rugby League Football Club, better known as The Bulldogs. The series was financed by Canterbury Leagues Club for the football club and produced by Richard Bradley Productions. The producer on behalf of the production company was Richard Bradley and Phil Pellizzeri acted as associate producer and executive producer on behalf of the football club.

== Production ==
Production of the four-part series initially commenced in 2000 with the filming of the most senior players from foundation period in 1935 including Eddie Burns and Joe Gartner. Along with these interviews a key interview was also filmed with Peter "Bullfrog" Moore, the famous Secretary and CEO of the football club only a few weeks before he died in 2000.

With the foundation interviews secured, the series was eventually commissioned in 2005 and completed in 2010. The narrative was told through life story interviews with over 60 famous players, coaches, officials, supporters, families, and historians. These interviews were all intercut to tell the narrative in first person and provide a thorough social and sporting history from each historical era.

== Synopsis ==
The series tells the story from 1908 when Rugby League Football was first introduced in Australia up to the club winning its 8th Premiership in 2004.

The game started being played in the local Canterbury area from 1909 in local and junior competitions when eventually the district club Canterbury-Bankstown was admitted into the New South Wales Rugby League which was the major competition in 1935. Success was very quick for the club winning premierships in 1938 and 1942. They went on to win a famous premiership in 1980 which heralded a successful decade winning the competition on another three occasions in the 1980s. Another premiership was won in 1995 against all odds when they just made the semifinals finishing fifth during the Super League War that was dividing the game, and eventually an eighth premiership in 2004.

== Reception ==
Although the club has had its fair share of well publicized controversies, they are considered as an important part of the National Rugby League competition.

The series was well received on online sites with supporters of the club buying copies of the DVD series.

The Mighty Bulldogs was a part of two other similar series from the producer, The Mighty Eels and The Mighty Bears.

The four volumes are:

1. The Mighty Bulldogs Volume 1 (1908-1967) - Classified G
2. The Mighty Bulldogs Volume 2 (1968-1980) - Classified G
3. The Mighty Bulldogs Volume 3 (1981-1988) - Classified PG
4. The Mighty Bulldogs Volume 4 (1989-2004) - Classified PG

The total running time is 12 hours and including the initial filming in 2000 the entire four-part series took six years to produce.
