= Ben Webster (disambiguation) =

Ben Webster (1909–1973) was an American jazz tenor saxophonist.

Benjamin or Ben Webster or may also refer to:

- Benjamin Nottingham Webster (1797–1882), English actor
- Ben Webster (actor) (1864–1947), English actor
- Benjamin Webster (politician) (1867–1923), American politician in Wisconsin
- Ben Webster (businessman) (1930–1997), Canadian businessman
- Ben Webster (footballer) (born 1986), English footballer
