= Southern Crossing (disambiguation) =

Southern Crossing is a tramping track in New Zealand's Tararua Range.

Southern Crossing may also refer to:

- Southern Crossing (California), a proposed bridge spanning California's San Francisco Bay
- Southern Crossing (film), a documentary by Robert Guillemot
