= Jesse Clason =

American politician

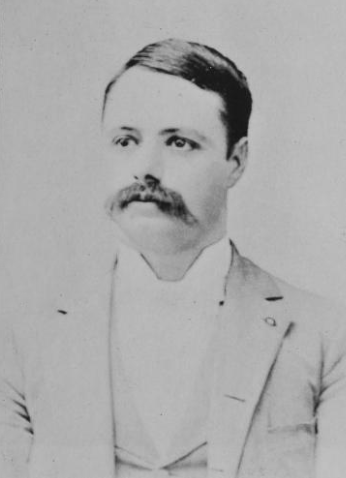

Member of the Wisconsin State Assembly
- In office 1897
- Constituency: Dodge County

Personal details
- Born: Jesse Arthur Clason; October 15, 1860 Clason Prairie, Wisconsin
- Died: April 7, 1918 (aged 57) Fond du Lac, Wisconsin
- Resting place: Forest Home Cemetery
- Party: Gold Democrat
- Spouses: Dixie Lennox (m. 1882; died 1884) Bertha E. Hall (m. 1885; died 1901) Mayme Immel (m. 1906)
- Occupation: Physician, politician

Jesse Arthur Clason (October 15, 1860 – April 7, 1918) was an American physician from Neosho, Wisconsin who served a single term as a member of the Wisconsin State Assembly from Dodge County; he was elected as a Gold Democrat.

== Background ==
Clason was born October 15, 1860, in Clason Prairie, Wisconsin, son of Michael B. and Sarah Phelps Clason. He was educated in the Clason Prairie district school and in the Milwaukee Public Schools. He attended Wayland University in Beaver Dam, and began to study medicine in 1882. He apprenticed himself to Dr. S. W. Thurber, whom he accompanied to Tecumseh, Nebraska. On April 10, 1882, he married Dixie Lennox (1852–1884). Clason attended the Missouri Medical College, graduating on March 4, 1884.

In 1884 he moved to Elk Creek, Nebraska; in 1885, he moved briefly to Chicago, but in October returned to Dodge County, settling in Neosho and taking up medical practice there. He served as health officer of the Towns of Herman and Rubicon; and worked as United States pension examining surgeon in Milwaukee in 1893, and in 1894 transferred to the Horicon, Wisconsin regional headquarters.

He remarried to Bertha E. Hall (1876–1901) on May 2, 1885. After she died of cancer of the liver, he married for a third time in 1906, to Mayme Immel (1880–1959).

== Politics ==
Clason was organizer and first president of the Neosho Young Men's Democratic Club. He was chairman of the Dodge County Democratic committee until the 1896 Democratic National Convention in Chicago. Although Clason had been elected as a delegate to the state's Democratic convention, he was an outspoken advocate of the gold standard. When the Chicago convention nominated William Jennings Bryan and adopted a free silver platform, he repudiated it. According to his biography in the 1897 Wisconsin Blue Book, he endorsed the Republican presidential ticket of McKinley and Hobart, and Edward Sauerhering the Republican candidate for re-election in Wisconsin's 2nd congressional district; but the Milwaukee Journal had reported before the election that he was denying reports of his support for McKinley and advocating the National Democratic Party (Gold Democrat) ticket of Palmer and Buckner.

He was elected to the Assembly's 1st Dodge County district (the Towns of Ashippun, Clyman, Emmet, Herman, Hubbard, Hustisford, Lebanon, LeRoy, Lomira, Rubicon, Shields, Theresa, and Williamston; the Village of Horicon, and the Fifth and Sixth Wards of the City of Watertown, and the city of Mayville, having been nominated by the Gold Democrats and endorsed by the Republicans. He won with 2,946 votes, to 2,414 for the incumbent, regular Democrat Herman Rosenkranz. He was assigned to the standing committee on public health and sanitation (of which he became chairman); and that on bills on their third reading. On January 26, 1897, "to express the contempt of his constituents for the damnable Chicago platform" (as he declared in an impassioned speech from the floor) he voted for the Republican candidate for United States Senate, John C. Spooner, over the "Silver Democrat" candidate Willis C. Silverthorn.

He was not a candidate for re-election in 1898, and was succeeded by Democrat John Kessler. (The Gold Democrats as a movement had dissipated in the wake of Bryan's loss in 1896.)

== After the Assembly ==
From 1903 to 1906, he was the editor of the short-lived weekly newspaper The Neosho Standard.

In 1905 he sold his property in Neosho and moved to Pierce County, where he continued to practice medicine. By March 1913 Clason had moved to Fond du Lac. He died of heart failure in his home there on April 7, 1918. His death was reported in the Journal of the American Medical Association. Described as a "prominent Scottish Rite Mason and Shriner," he was buried with Masonic rites in Milwaukee's Forest Home Cemetery.
