= Walter Peterson =

Walter Peterson may refer to:

- Walter R. Peterson Jr. (1922–2011), American realtor, educator, and Republican politician from New Hampshire
- Walter Peterson (field hockey) (born 1883), Irish field hockey player

== See also ==
- P. Walter Petersen (1878–1958), American businessman, politician and Danish diplomat
