= Koepsell =

Koepsell is a surname. Notable people with the surname include:

- David Koepsell (born 1969), American author, philosopher, attorney, and educator
- John J. Koepsell (1852–1925), American businessman and politician
