= George Green (rugby league) =

Australian rugby league footballer

Personal information
- Full name: Edward George Green
- Born: 17 December 1883 Grafton, New South Wales
- Died: 17 November 1938 (aged 54) Dural, New South Wales

Playing information
- Position: Lock, Second-row, Hooker
Club
| Years | Team | Pld | T | G | FG | P |
|---|---|---|---|---|---|---|
| 1909–11 | Eastern Suburbs | 16 | 0 | 0 | 0 | 0 |
| 1912–22 | North Sydney | 88 | 12 | 0 | 0 | 36 |
| | Total | 104 | 12 | 0 | 0 | 36 |
Representative
| Years | Team | Pld | T | G | FG | P |
| 1910 | New South Wales | 1 | 1 | 0 | 0 | 3 |
| 1911 | Metropolis | 1 | 0 | 0 | 0 | 0 |
- Source: Rugby League Project

Edward George Green (born 17 December 1883 in Grafton, New South Wales), was a pioneer Australian Rugby League player. He is reputed to have been the first Indigenous Australian to play rugby league at first-grade level in Australia.

== Club career ==
George Green played for the club sides Eastern Suburbs for four seasons between 1908–11 and North Sydney for 10 seasons between 1912–1916 and 1918–1922.

A utility forward, Green made his debut playing for the Eastern Suburbs club in 1908 season, rugby league's founding year in Australia. He played in the Eastern suburbs side in 1911, the year that club won their first premiership. He moved to the North Sydney club the following year where he played for the next ten seasons.

In 1916 Green captained the North Sydney club and in 1918-1919 he was Captain-coach.

Green was a vice-captain with the Norths during the club's golden era in its only two premiership winning seasons – 1921 and 1922. With the latter he became the oldest player to ever win a premiership at 38 years and 263 days, a record that still stands as of 2026.

Green, who has been described as "scholarly" and "trend-setting", was a crowd favourite, a whole-hearted player who often came up with an important play at vital times in a match. Both on and off the field Green is described as being a gentleman.

== Coaching and administrative career ==
He is reputed to have been the first chief organizer of The Eastern Suburbs junior league, and coached the winners of the first President Cup competition.

Green was made a vice president of the North Sydney club in 1923 and a member of the club's finance committee during his stay.

Following his retirement from the major rugby league administration in Sydney, Green spent time coaching the Lismore Rugby League club in northern N.S.W. where he had great success in 1931. From this League a team was selected by the Queensland Rugby League to play in the prestigious Bulimba Cup.

He also coached at the Cessnock club the 1930s. It was during his time at Cessnock, that he unearthed the remarkable talents of a local player, Ray Markham, who had a remarkable career at English club, Huddersfield where played 6 seasons, scored 255 tries and won a Challenge Cup medal.

George Green gave many lectures in rural N.S.W. educating many players and coaches on the finer points of Rugby League.

== Death ==
George Green died at his home at Dural, New South Wales on 17 Nov 1938. His funeral was two days later at the Northern Suburbs Crematorium.

== Accolades ==
George Green has been recognized as the Sydney Roosters 20th ever player.

The George Green Medal, an award for Indigenous Australian rugby league players, was named in his honour. The Medal was first awarded in 2008.

Green's apparent Aboriginality has come into question with University of Western Sydney historian Andrew Moore's suggestion that Green's father was actually of Afro-Caribbean origin. During his lifetime Green told people that he was Polynesian or Maori.

== Sources ==
- The Mighty Bears; Andrew Moore
- History of the NSW Rugby League Finals; Steve Haddan
