= Saylesville, Wisconsin =

Saylesville may refer to the following places in the U.S. state of Wisconsin:

- Saylesville, Dodge County, Wisconsin, an unincorporated community
- Saylesville, Waukesha County, Wisconsin, an unincorporated community
