= Headgear to Helmets =

2018 Australian documentary film

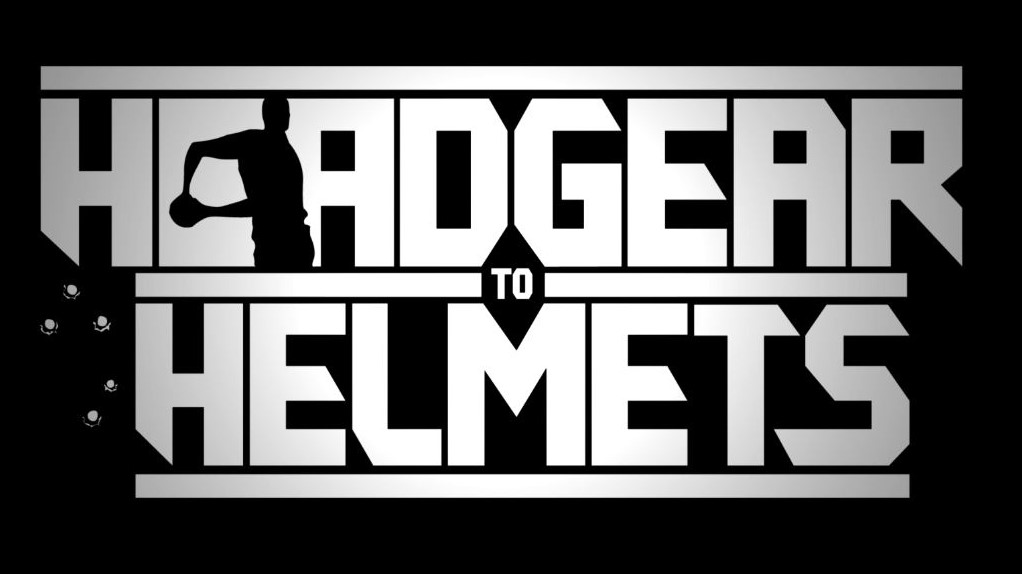
- Written by: Terry Williams
- Directed by: Richard Bradley
- Music by: Max Harrison (Sound), Yerim Lee (piano), Ben Tjoa (violin), Margaret Brandman (Arrangements), Recorded at St Stephens Church, Bellevue Hill Sydney
- Country of origin: Australia

Production
- Producers: Richard Bradley and Terry Williams
- Cinematography: Chris Maguire
- Editors: Richard Bradley and Sam Bright
- Running time: 44 minutes
- Production companies: Richard Bradley Productions, Post Production by, Tracks Post Production and Vandal Post Production. Financed by National Rugby League

Original release
- Release: 11 November 2018

Headgear to Helmets is a 44-minute documentary about Rugby League Football during World War I. It is presented by historians and family descendants, with readings from former players, coaches, commentators and journalists.

== Storyline ==
The tale considers the origin of the game in Australia in 1908, predominately in New South Wales and Queensland. In 1914 the English toured Australia for the second time, culminating in the famous "Rourke’s Drift" 3rd Test in Sydney in which the visitors won with a reduced number of players. It was the last Test before the war. Many Rugby League representative and club players enlisted, but the league decided to continue. This was a contentious issue as other sports stopped for the duration of the war. It was argued by the Rugby League that it provided normality for the Australians required to run the home front. Anecdotes tell of players who did not return and the gallantry that earned two players the Victoria Cross. It shows the hardships of life on the homefront as the war continued. Two conscription plebiscites failed as the casualties mounted. A huge industrial strike in 1917.

The presenter is former player Nathan Hindmarsh whose great grandfather enlisted. The story is told by historians Terry Williams, Greg Shannon, David Middleton, Tom Mather and Max Solling by and family descendants: Paul Watkins (Jack ‘Bluey’ Watkins), Josie Shelley (Herbert ‘Nutsy’ Bolt), Leslie Perry (George Cummins) and Karen Verguizas (Frank Cheadle).

The documentary also includes readings from newspapers and correspondence of the time by Michael Cleary, Alan Tongue, Laurie Daley, Kristian Heffernan, Richard Bradley, Peter Wynn, Andrew Ryan, Tim Sheens, Ben Ross, David Morrow and Glenn Jackson.

== Production ==
The documentary was conceived by Rugby League historian Terry Williams, while he worked for the NRL Museum as official historian. He engaged Richard Bradley Productions who had produced other Rugby League documentaries as the production company. NRL funding allowed production to start in late 2014. A 3-minute promotional clip was screened at halftime during the 25 April Anzac round of games celebrating the 100th Anniversary of the Anzac landings at Gallipoli in 1915. After a funding hiatus of 18 months the documentary was completed in 2018.

== Release ==
The documentary had its official screening at 11 am on 11 November 2018 on the National Rugby League website celebrate the 100th Anniversary of the armistice that ended the Great War. The documentary is viewable from the NRL website.

== Reception ==
The documentary was well received, earning positive reviews in The Sydney Morning Herald and The Telegraph. Roy Masters writing in the Herald that the documentary debunked the myth that game was absent during the war. Masters quoted from one of the historians saying, "many (players) went to war because they sought adventure". In fact, a contemporary journalist described the war "as the greatest game of all". His article also mentioned the many social and political divisions outlined in the documentary. And Nick Walshaw wrote in The Telegraph as to why fans should know the story of Herbert ‘Nutsy’ Bolt who was one of players whose story was told. And with so many stories, he quoted the producers saying, "it was like pouring a keg into a schooner glass, because this story, it’s about heroes, ratbags and everything else in between."
