= Isaac J. Kvam =

American politician

Isaac J. Kvam (January 28, 1864 – February 14, 1917) was an American Lutheran minister and elected official.

Isaac J. Kvam was born at Sjølstad in the district of Namdalen, Nord-Trøndelag, Norway. At age 19, Kvam emigrated to the United States in 1883. Kvam went to Luther College in Decorah, Iowa and Luther Seminary in Robbinsdale, Minnesota. He was ordained to the Lutheran ministry in 1893 and was pastor of a church in Seattle, Washington from 1893 to 1895. In 1895, Kvam moved to Rice Lake, Wisconsin and was pastor of the Norwegian Synod Church. In 1911, Kvam retired from the ministry because of ill health. In 1917, Kvam served in the Wisconsin State Assembly as a Republican legislator representing Barron County. He died in a hospital in Madison, Wisconsin, while still in office, of a blood clot, as a result from having oral surgery to remove an abscessed tooth. C. A. Beggs succeeded him.
