= The Mighty Eels =

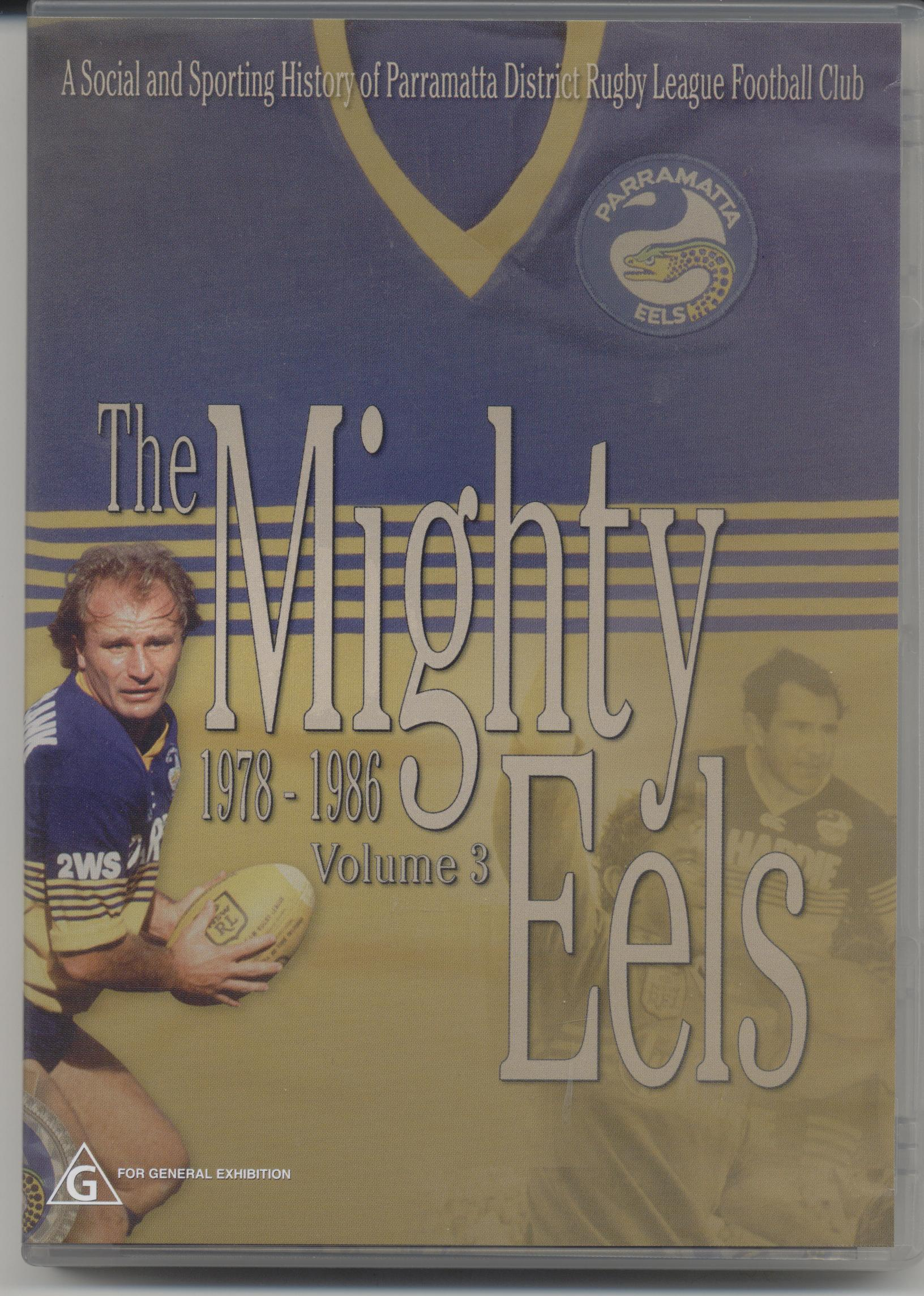
- Directed by: Richard Bradley
- Country of origin: Australia

Production
- Executive producer: Parramatta Leagues Club
- Producer: Richard Bradley
- Cinematography: Chris Maguire
- Editor: Richard Bradley
- Running time: 13 hours, 4 parts
- Production company: Richard Bradley Productions

Original release
- Release: 2004 – 2006

The Mighty Eels is an Australian social and sporting history DVD series about Parramatta District Rugby League Football Club, better known as the Eels. The series was financed by Parramatta Leagues Club and produced by Richard Bradley Productions. The producer on behalf of the production company was Richard Bradley, and Denis Fitzgerald who was CEO of Parramatta Leagues Club acted as associate producer on behalf of the Leagues Club.

Production of the four-part series commenced in February 2003 and was completed in September 2006. The narrative was told through life story interviews with 58 famous players, coaches, officials, supporters, families and historians. These interviews were all inter-cut to tell the narrative in first person and provide a thorough social and sporting history from each historical era.

== History ==
The series tells the story of Parramatta in the early days of settlement from 1800, then to 1908 when Cumberland was a foundation club in the newly created Rugby League Football code in Australia, up to 2001 when they appeared in their 8th Grand Final.

When the game of Rugby League was established in 1908, Cumberland was the foundation club that represented the Parramatta area; however, they only lasted one year. The local officials led by Jack Argent attempted to enter a Parramatta team in the 1936 competition but failed. Because of World War II, the area had to wait until 1947 to be admitted along with Manly. This saw the New South Wales Rugby League competition expand from eight to ten teams.

In the early seasons from 1947 the club came last on many occasions but with the introduction of players such as Ron Lynch, Brian Hambly and Ken Thornett they started making semifinals and finals from 1963 to 1965. This success would come again in the 1970s with semifinal appearances in 1971 and 1975. With the introduction of players such as Mick Cronin, Ray Price and John Peard the team made the Grand Finals of 1976 and 1977. The 1977 Grand Final was a famous draw after extra time which required a replay the following week which they lost to St George. In that 1977 season Parramatta supplied seven players to the Australian World Cup squad including the coach Terry Fearnley. The club also made the finals in 1978 and 1979.

The real success came between 1981 and 1986 when the club appeared in five grand finals, winning four of them. Under the famous coach Jack Gibson they won three premierships in a row from 1981 during that period. They also had the entire NSW state of origin backline from Ray Price (lock), Peter Sterling (half), Brett Kenny (5/8th), Steve Ella and Mick Cronin (centres) and Eric Grothe (wing). After a low period with the retirement of many top players the club built itself again with younger players such as Michael Vella, Nathan Hindmarsh and Nathan Cayless. With coach Brian Smith they saw regular final appearances from 1997 leading to the Grand Final in 2001.

The club has a good following of fans and are valued as an important part of the National Rugby League current 16 team competition.

== Series ==
The DVD series was critically acclaimed in the media with reviews in the Sunday Telegraph and the Parramatta Advertiser.

The series was popular with supporters of the club through niche marketing of the DVDs to this target audience.

The Mighty Eels is one of three similar series from the same producer; the others are The Mighty Bulldogs and The Mighty Bears.

The four Mighty Eels DVD volumes are 1908–1966, 1967–1977, 1978–1986, and 1987–2001. The total running time is 13 hours.
