= Rubicon (community), Wisconsin =

Rubicon, Wisconsin
- Unincorporated community
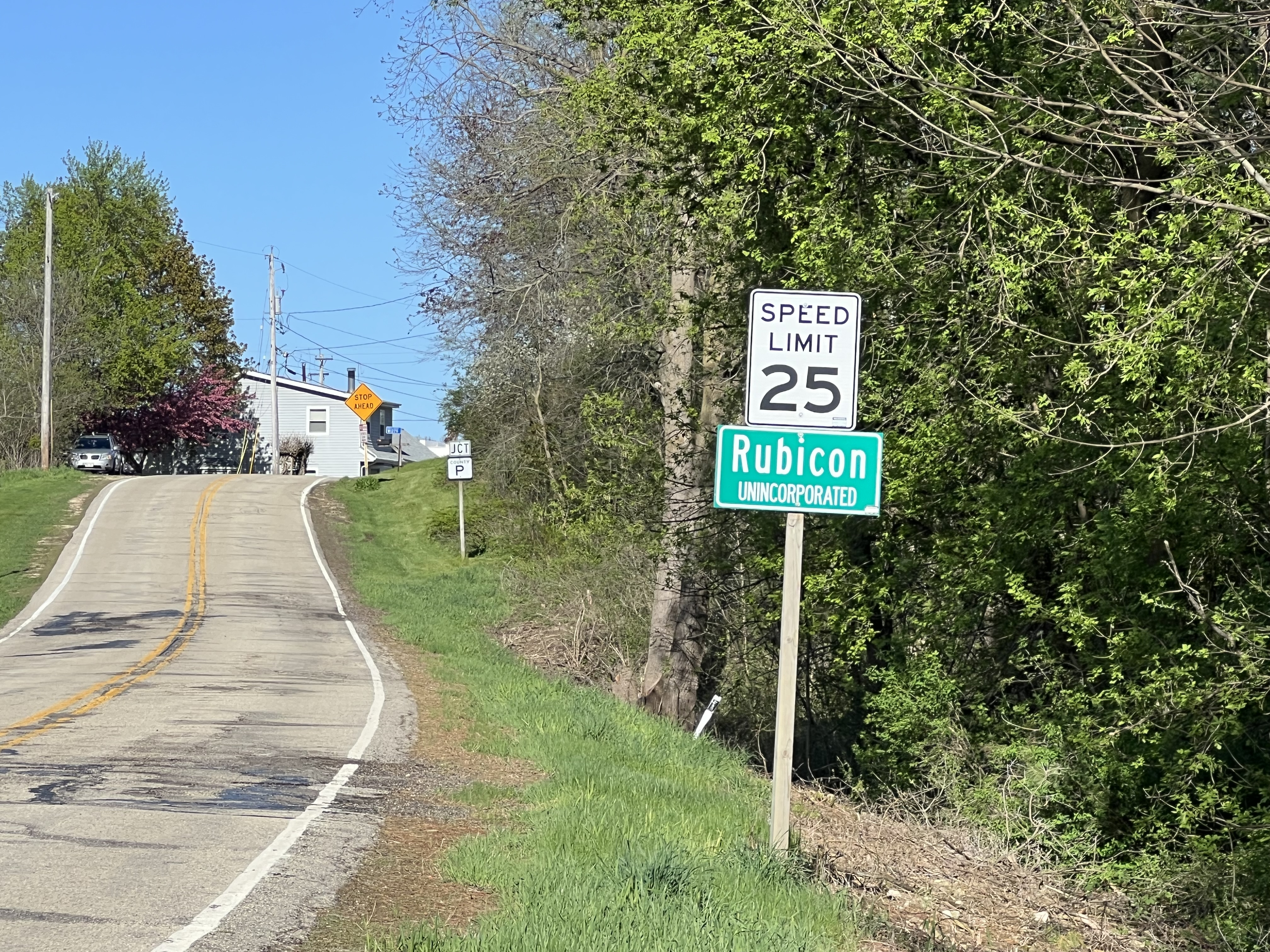

- Location within Wisconsin Location within the United States
- Coordinates: 43°20′25″N 88°27′27″W
- Country: United States
- State: Wisconsin
- County: Dodge
- Town: Rubicon

Area
  - Total: 0.42 sq mi (1.10 km^{2})
- Elevation: 1,007 ft (307 m)

Population
  - Total: 235
- Time zone: UTC-6 (Central (CST))
  - Summer (DST): UTC-5 (CDT)
- ZIP code: 53078
- Area code: 920
- GNIS feature ID: 1572703

Rubicon is an unincorporated community located in the town of Rubicon, Dodge County, Wisconsin, United States. Rubicon is 4.5 miles (7.2 km) west-northwest of Hartford. Rubicon has a post office with ZIP code 53078.
