= Clason Prairie, Wisconsin =

Former settlement in Wisconsin, United States

Clason Prairie or Clason's Prairie was a former settlement in the Town of Beaver Dam, Wisconsin, United States, roughly four miles southeast of Beaver Dam. It was named after James Clason, a native of Connecticut who settled there in 1841 and died in 1848. The one-room Clason Prairie School was closed down in 1962, although the building was still standing as of 1977. The old Clason Prairie Cemetery is still extant, at 43°24′49″N 88°46′52″W; it is maintained by the town.

== Notable people ==
- Jesse Clason, physician and politician, was born in Clason Prairie.
