= Art Hauser =

American football player (born 1929)

No. 65, 74, 67, 71
- Positions: Defensive tackle, guard, tackle

Personal information
- Born: July 19, 1929 (age 97); Rubicon, Wisconsin, U.S.
- Listed height: 6 ft 0 in (1.83 m)
- Listed weight: 237 lb (108 kg)

Career information
- High school: Hartford
- College: Xavier
- NFL draft: 1954: 5th round, 58th overall pick

Career history
- Los Angeles Rams (1954–1957); Chicago Cardinals (1959); New York Giants (1959); Boston Patriots (1960); Denver Broncos (1961)

Career NFL/AFL statistics
- Games played: 76
- Games started: 53
- Fumble recoveries: 5
- Sacks: 6
- Stats at Pro Football Reference

Arthur A. Hauser (born July 19, 1929) is an American former professional football player who was a defensive lineman in the National Football League (NFL) and the American Football League (AFL). He played college football for the Xavier Musketeers.

== College career ==
Hauser attended Xavier University in Cincinnati from 1950 to 1954 and played four seasons as a defensive tackle and special teams stalwart for the Musketeers.

== Professional career ==
Hauser played seven seasons for the Los Angeles Rams (1954–1957), Chicago Cardinals (1959), New York Giants (1959), Boston Patriots (1960), and Denver Broncos (1961).

== Life after football ==
Following his playing career, Hauser was an NFL scout for the Miami Dolphins and the Cincinnati Bengals.
