= Walter Wittman =

American politician

Walter Wittman (March 8, 1857 – ?) was an American newspaper executive and politician.

Born in Manitowoc, Wisconsin, Wittman was the editor of the Manitowoc Post a Gernam language newspaper and later worked for the Manitowoc Daily Herald newspaper. Wittman was also a member of the printers union. In a special February 1918 election, Wittman was elected to the Wisconsin State Assembly succeeding Carl Hansen who died in office. Wittman was a Democrat.
