= Southern Crossing (film) =

- 1st Sydney International Music Festival January 1980
- Directed by: Robert Guillemot
- Produced by: Richard Bradley
- Starring: Dave Brubeck, Herbie Mann
- Cinematography: Guy Furner
- Edited by: Barry Fawcett
- Production company: Richard Bradley Productions
- Distributed by: Richard Bradley Productions
- Release date: 29 November 1980
- Running time: 92 minutes
- Country: Australia
- Language: English

Southern Crossing is a documentary directed by Robert Guillemot and produced by Richard Bradley. The film documents the 1980 International Music Festival, which took place from 7–14 January 1980 at the Regent Theatre in Sydney, Australia.

== Cast ==
The artists featured in the film were the Dave Brubeck Quartet, Herbie Mann and the Family of Mann, the Les McCann Band, Howie Smith and the Jazz Co-op, the Toshiko Akiyoshi–Lew Tabackin Big Band of Australian All Stars, Galapagos Duck, Judy Bailey Quintet with John Sangster, Ricky May, and the Young Northside Big Band. American jazz critic Leonard Feather, who attended the festival, provided the commentary.

== Production ==
The film used locations around Sydney Harbour and featured surfing scenes with surfer Terry Richardson and a jam session at the famous Basement Jazz Restaurant in Sydney. Southern Crossing was financed by the Australian Film Commission and Richard Bradley Productions along with sponsorship investment from Qantas and Peter Stuyvesant International.

== Release ==
The film was released theatrically in Australia in 1980 and later in New Zealand in 1983. In 1981, television rights were sold via MIPTV in Cannes and NAPTE in New York. That same year, the film was screened at two international film festivals in Barcelona and Warsaw. There was a limited video release through Diners Club in 1984 and eventually a limited DVD release in 2007 over 25 years after it was made. Since completion of the film in 1980 the distributor has been Richard Bradley Productions who produced the poster and all associated advertising, publicity and sales.

== Critical reception ==
The film received good critical reviews in Australia, New Zealand, England, and the United States. Mike Harris in Variety called it "the definitive jazz film", while Ray Stanley in Screen International called the film "Australia's Jazz on a Summer's Day" (referring to the 1960 documentary). Eric Meyers wrote in the National Times that the film was "cleverly filmed and well worth seeing," although he complained in his review that it was a missed opportunity to feature more local artists, especially those playing traditional jazz. Jazz enthusiast Kim Bonython wrote in The News that "the Aussie film makers covered it with skill and imagination and I recommend it to jazz buffs and anyone interested in movies for their own sake." The Sydney Morning Herald critic John Shand gave the film three stars after reviewing the DVD as a solid production. He also added that the Regent Theater where it was filmed was "so wonderful" they had to demolish it in references to the theater's heritage factor.
