= Second inauguration of Woodrow Wilson =

33rd United States presidential inauguration

Second presidential inauguration of Woodrow Wilson
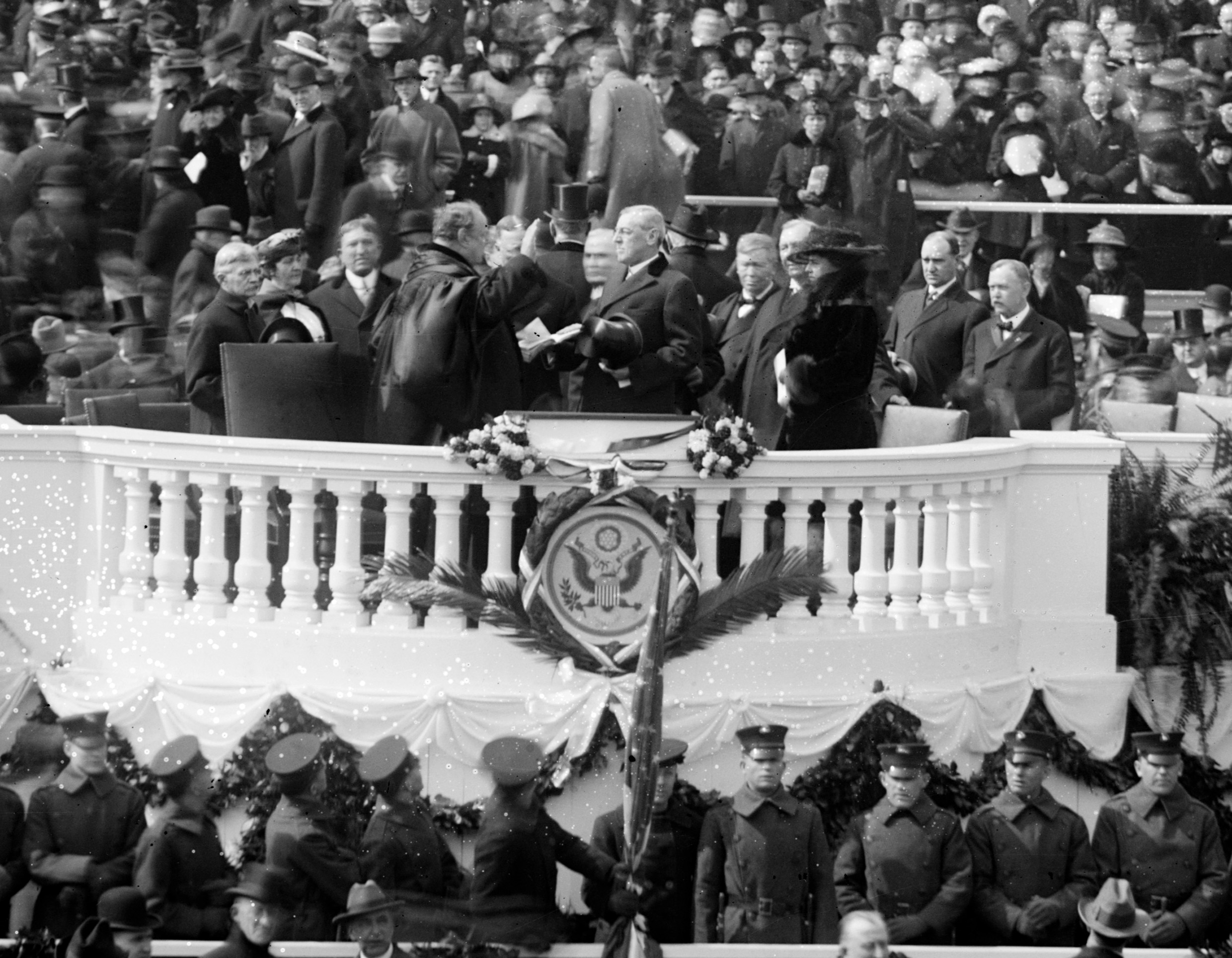
- Inauguration ceremonies at the Capitol.
- Date: March 4, 1917; 109 years ago (private); March 5, 1917 (public)
- Location: United States Capitol, Washington, D.C.
- Organized by: Joint Congressional Committee on Inaugural Ceremonies
- Participants: Woodrow Wilson; 28th president of the United States — Assuming office Edward Douglass White; Chief Justice of the United States — Administering oath Thomas R. Marshall; 28th vice president of the United States — Assuming office Willard Saulsbury Jr. President pro tempore of the United States Senate — Administering oath

The second inauguration of Woodrow Wilson as president of the United States was held privately on Sunday, March 4, 1917, at the President's Room inside the United States Capitol in Washington, D.C., and publicly on Monday, March 5, 1917, at the East Portico of the Capitol. This was the 33rd inauguration and marked the commencement of the second and final four-year term of both Woodrow Wilson as president and Thomas R. Marshall as vice president. Chief Justice Edward D. White administered the presidential oath of office to Wilson.

Crowds of men in Washington for the inauguration assaulted women who were picketing the White House and demanding that women get the right to vote. Press coverage of the violence and the women's suffrage movement overshadowed that of the inauguration itself.

== Gallery ==
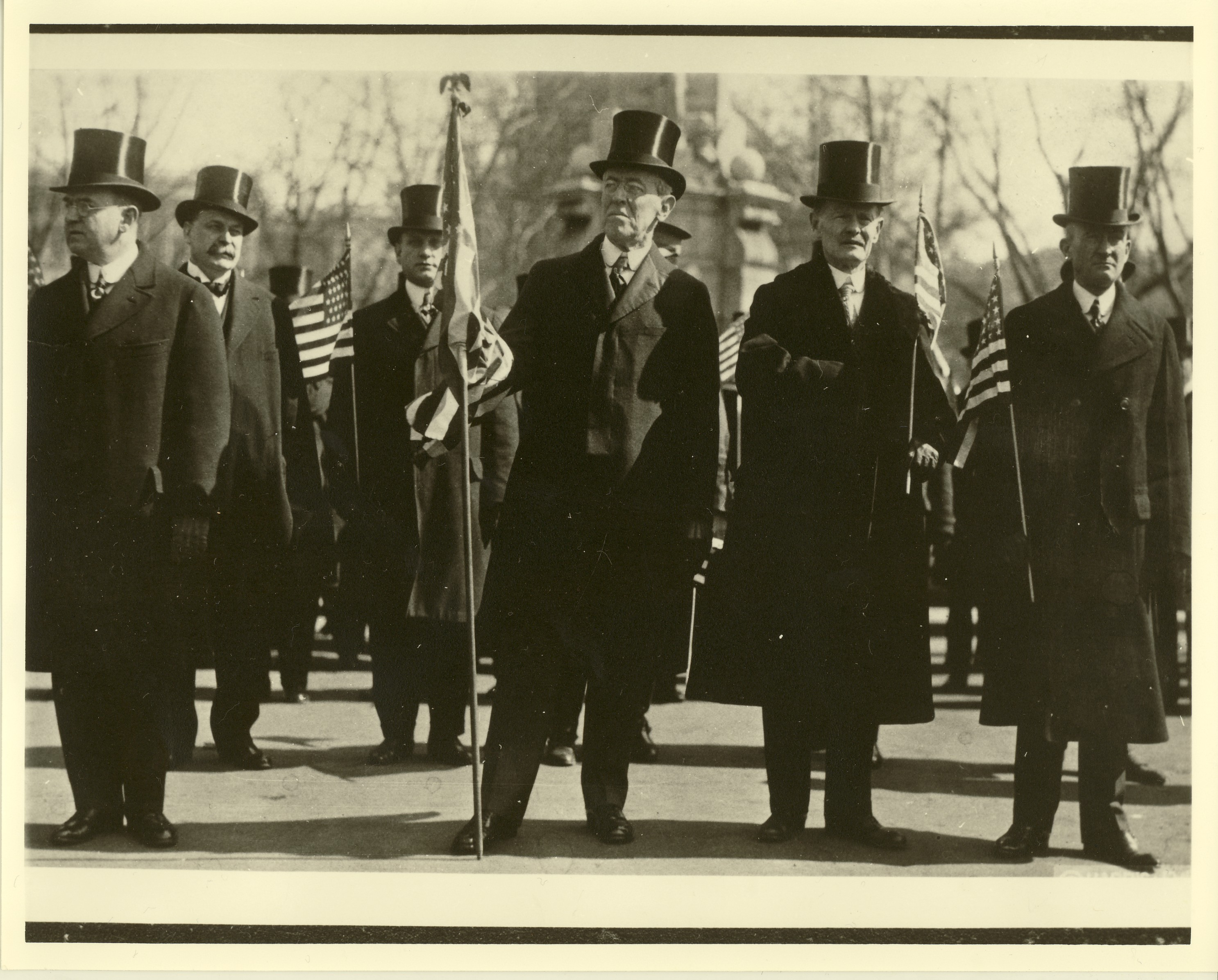
President Wilson in his second inauguration parade.

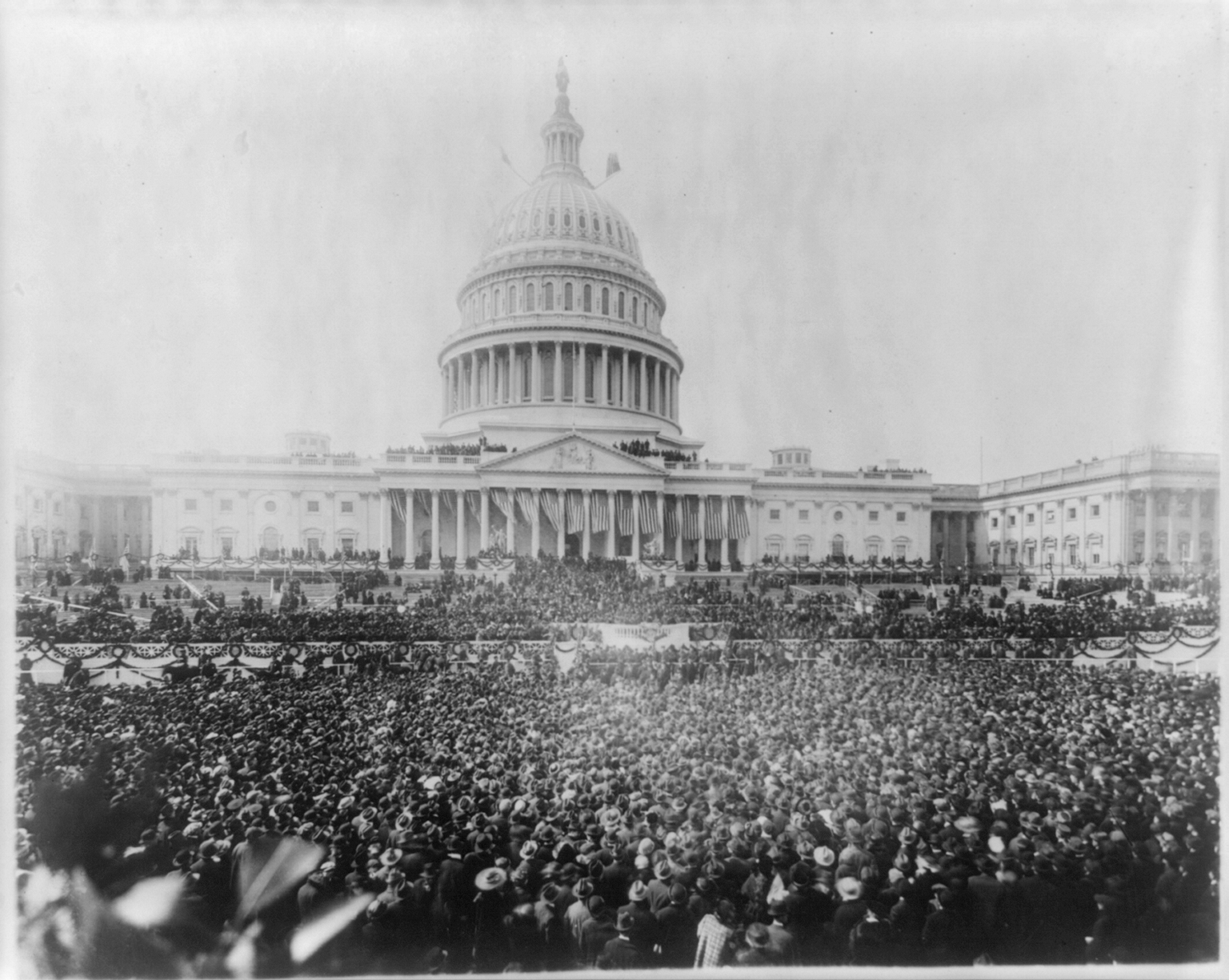
Wilson's inauguration, 1917

== See also ==
- Presidency of Woodrow Wilson
- First inauguration of Woodrow Wilson
- 1916 United States presidential election
