= Ben Webster (businessman) =

Donald Colin Webster, known as Ben Webster (1930–1997) was a venture capitalist who started Helix Investments in 1968, making investments into dozens of early stage companies, including Corel, Geac, Mitel, and OpenText. He also founded the Toronto Society of Psychical Research and the New Horizons Foundation which was responsible for physic experiments at Princeton University.
