= James H. Jensen =

American politician

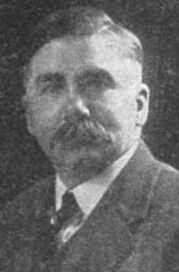

Member of the Wisconsin State Assembly
- In office 1918–1919

Personal details
- Born: August 16, 1864 Grantsburg, Wisconsin, US
- Died: March 16, 1943 (aged 78) Grantsburg, Wisconsin, US
- Party: Republican

James H. Jensen (August 16, 1864 – March 16, 1943) was a member of the Wisconsin State Assembly.

== Biography ==
James Jensen was born on a farm near Grantsburg, Wisconsin. He was one of eight children born to Norwegian immigrants. Jensen was a businessman engaged in mercantile, lumber and real estate. He was first elected as a member of the Wisconsin State Assembly during the 1917 session and was afterwards re-elected. Other public positions he held included County Clerk and Chairman of the County Board of Burnett County, Wisconsin and Village President (similar to Mayor) of Grantsburg. He was a Republican.

He died at his home in Grantsburg on May 16, 1943.

== Other sources ==
- Smallwood, William Hillary ed. (1905) Commemorative Biographical Record of the Upper Lake Region (Chicago: J. H. Beers & Company)
