= Bloomer (town), Wisconsin =

Town in Wisconsin, United States

Bloomer, Wisconsin
- Town
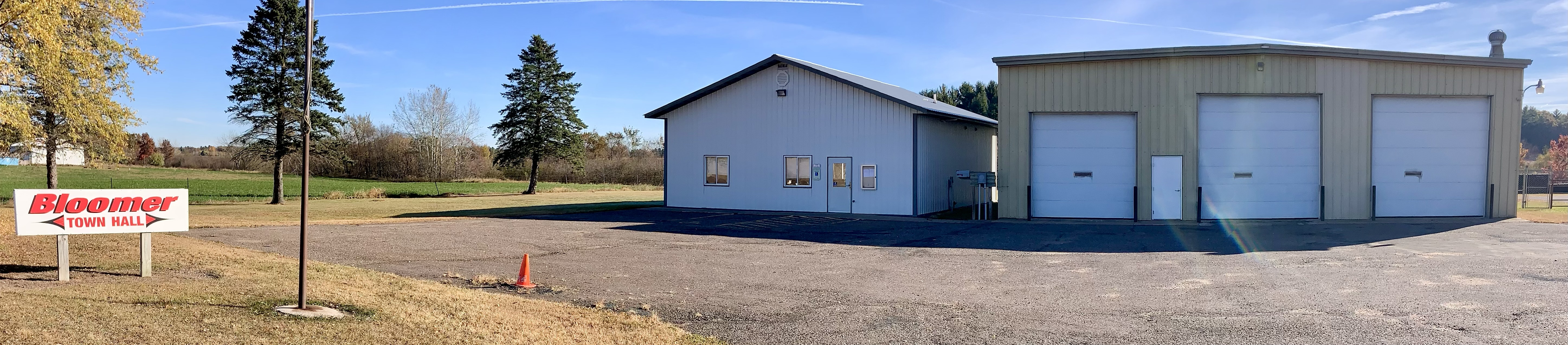
- Town hall

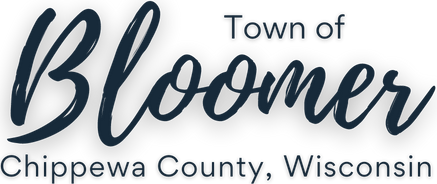
- Logo

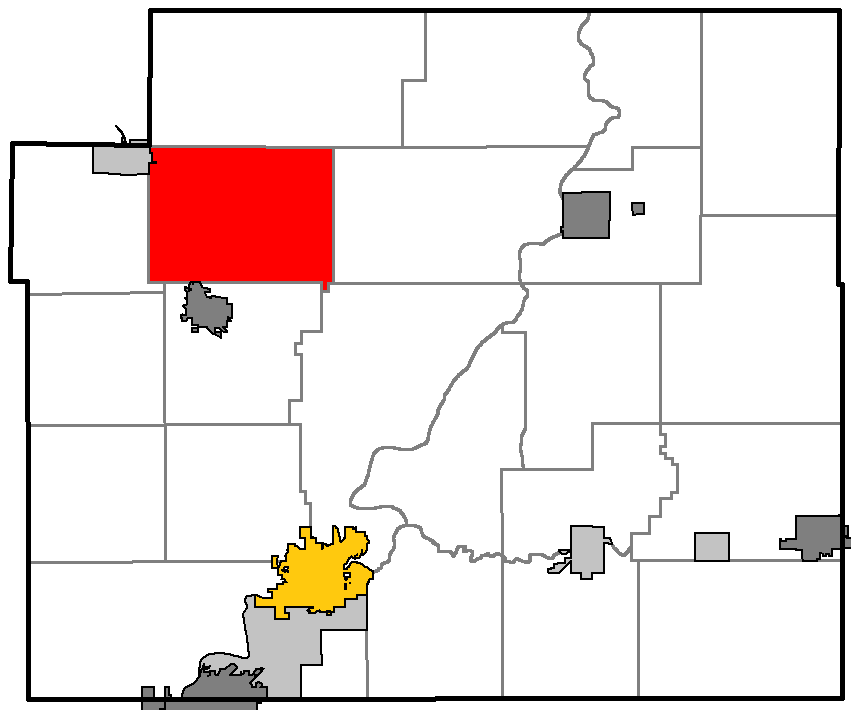
- Location within Chippewa County

- Location within the state of Wisconsin
- Coordinates: 45°9′48″N 91°28′52″W
- Country: United States
- State: Wisconsin
- County: Chippewa

Government
  - Chairman: Gary Nehring

Area
  - Total: 47.8 sq mi (123.8 km^{2})
  - Land: 47.1 sq mi (121.9 km^{2})
  - Water: 0.73 sq mi (1.9 km^{2})
- Elevation: 1,114 ft (340 m)

Population (2020)
  - Total: 1,090
  - Density: 23.2/sq mi (8.94/km^{2})
- Time zone: UTC-6 (Central (CST))
  - Summer (DST): UTC-5 (CDT)
- Area codes: 715 & 534
- FIPS code: 55-017-08250
- GNIS feature ID: 1582831
- PLSS township: T31N R9W and western 2 miles of T31N R8W
- Website: townofbloomer.com

Bloomer is a town in Chippewa County in the U.S. state of Wisconsin. The population was 1,090 at the 2020 census, up from 926 at the 2000 census. The city of Bloomer is also located in Chippewa County, but to the south of the town within the adjacent town of Woodmohr.

== Geography ==
The town of Bloomer is a 6-by-8-mile (9.7 by 12.9 km) rectangle in northwestern Chippewa County. According to the United States Census Bureau, the town has a total area of 47.8 square miles (123.8 km^{2}), of which 47.1 square miles (121.9 km^{2}) are land and 0.73 square miles (1.9 km^{2}), or 1.57%, are water. Marsh-Miller Lake is in the eastern part of the town.

== History ==
In July 1847, a team working for the U.S. government conducted the first survey of 6-mile (9.7 km) squares that would become Bloomer. In September 1852, other crews marked all the section corners of the six mile squares, walking through the woods and wading the swamps, measuring with chain and compass. When done, the deputy surveyor filed this general description of the western six miles:

This Township contains a large quantity of good Timber Pine Oaks & Sugar Maple are usually mixed throughout this Township. The surface is mostly undulating (except for a few small swamps), and the soil is light, consisting of a few inches of leaf mould with a gravelly or rocky subsoil. Two small creeks head mostly into this township &(?) run south.

== Demographics ==
Historical population
| Census | Pop. | Note | %± |
|---|---|---|---|
| 1990 | 880 | | — |
| 2000 | 926 | | 5.2% |
| 2010 | 1,050 | | 13.4% |
| 2020 | 1,090 | | 3.8% |

As of the census of 2000, there were 926 people, 321 households, and 246 families residing in the town. The population density was 19.7 people per square mile (7.6/km^{2}). There were 335 housing units at an average density of 7.1 per square mile (2.7/km^{2}). The racial makeup of the town was 99.57% White, 0.11% Native American, and 0.32% from two or more races. 0.22% of the population were Hispanic or Latino of any race.

There were 321 households, out of which 38.3% had children under the age of 18 living with them, 67.6% were married couples living together, 4.7% had a female householder with no husband present, and 23.1% were non-families. 17.8% of all households were made up of individuals, and 5.6% had someone living alone who was 65 years of age or older. The average household size was 2.88, and the average family size was 3.29.

In the town, the population was spread out, with 30.5% under the age of 18, 7.8% from 18 to 24, 27.6% from 25 to 44, 24.1% from 45 to 64, and 10.0% who were 65 years of age or older. The median age was 36 years. For every 100 females, there were 105.8 males. For every 100 females age 18 and over, there were 101.9 males.

The median income for a household in the town was $40,057, and the median income for a family was $44,028. Males had a median income of $29,327 versus $24,615 for females. The per capita income for the town was $16,243. About 4.3% of families and 6.4% of the population were below the poverty line, including 9.8% of those under age 18 and 1.8% of those age 65 or over.
