= Saylesville, Dodge County, Wisconsin =

Saylesville, Wisconsin
- Unincorporated community
- Location within Wisconsin Location within the United States
- Coordinates: 43°18′01″N 88°26′21″W
- Country: United States
- State: Wisconsin
- County: Dodge County
- Town: Rubicon
- Elevation: 925 ft (282 m)
- Time zone: UTC-6 (Central (CST))
  - Summer (DST): UTC-5 (CDT)
- Area code: 920
- GNIS feature ID: 1577814

Saylesville is an unincorporated community located in the town of Rubicon, Dodge County, Wisconsin, United States. Saylesville is 3 miles (4.8 km) west-southwest of Hartford.
