= J. W. Conner =

American politician

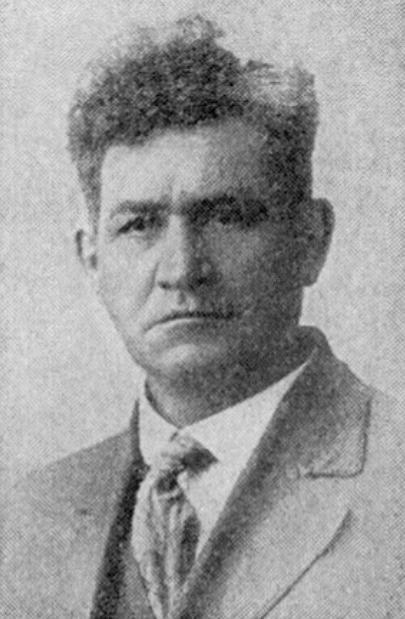

Member of the Wisconsin State Assembly
- In office 1917, 1919

Personal details
- Born: July 28, 1870 Preston County, West Virginia, US
- Died: April 14, 1937 (aged 66) Superior, Wisconsin, US
- Party: Progressive Republican
- Education: Drake University; Iowa State University

Joseph William Conner (1870–1937) was a member of the Wisconsin State Assembly.

== Biography ==
Conner was born on July 28, 1870, in Preston County, West Virginia. Later, he moved to Piatt County, Illinois attended Drake University and what is now Iowa State University. He eventually settled in Douglas County, Wisconsin.

He died at his home in Superior, Wisconsin on April 14, 1937.

== Assembly career ==
Conner was elected to the Assembly in 1916 and 1918. He was a Progressive Republican.
