= Carl Hansen (Wisconsin politician) =

American politician

Carl Hansen (January 3, 1866 – January 3, 1918) was an American farmer, businessman, and politician.

Born in Manitowoc, Wisconsin, Hansen was a farmer. Later, he was in the fire insurance and real estate business. Hansen was a Democrat. He served as assessor, treasurer, and harbor master for the City of Manitowoc. In 1898 and 1899, Hansen served on the Manitowoc Common Council. From 1911 until his death in 1918, Hansen served in the Wisconsin State Assembly. He died in Manitowoc, Wisconsin on January 3, 1918. Walter Wittman was elected, in a special February 1918 election, to the Wisconsin Assembly, to succeed Hansen.
