= Edmund J. Labuwi =

American politician

Edmund J. Labuwi (born January 9, 1873, in Rubicon, Wisconsin) was a Republican member of the Wisconsin State Assembly. He was elected to the Assembly in 1916. Additionally, Labuwi was Chairman (similar to Mayor) and Town Treasurer of Rubicon, Sheriff of Dodge County, Wisconsin, as well as President (also similar to Mayor) and Supervisor of Neosho, Wisconsin.

Labuwi was convicted of obtaining money under false pretenses. He paid a fine of $1,000 and costs, amounting to $1,600.

He died on June 16, 1921, at his home in Neosho, Wisconsin.
