= Richard H. Bradley =

American real estate developer

Richard H. Bradley is an American real estate developer. He served as Deputy Commissioner of Public Transportation for Hartford, Connecticut. He then became an executive director of the Downtown Council for Hartford. Likewise, he was then appointed President of the International Downtown Association in April 1984, where he served until 1996, when he stepped down to become executive director of the Downtown Washington, D.C. Business Improvement District he helped create.

The DC BID has been named one of the most successful in the country; during his tenure there, DC went from being deep in debt and taken over by the federal government to having a vibrant, walkable downtown whose revenues made up nearly half the city budget.
