= Thomas W. Bartingale =

American politician (1851–1934)

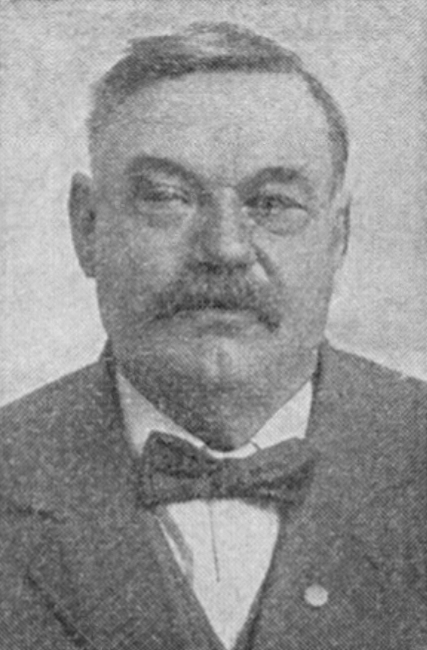

Member of the Wisconsin State Assembly
- In office 1913, 1919, 1921

Personal details
- Born: June 24, 1851 Ely, Cambridgeshire, England
- Died: March 26, 1934 (aged 82) Chippewa Falls, Wisconsin, US
- Party: Republican

Thomas W. Bartingale (June 24, 1851 – March 26, 1934) was an English-born American politician. He was a member of the Wisconsin State Assembly.

== Biography ==
Bartingale was born on June 24, 1851, in Ely, England. He was an organizer for the American Society of Equity, and would become involved in the lumber business.

Bartingale died in Chippewa Falls on March 26, 1934, at the age of 82.

== Political career ==
Bartingale was a member of the Assembly during the 1913, 1919 and 1921 sessions. In 1923, he was elected Sergeant at Arms of the Assembly. He was a Republican.
