= Rubicon, Wisconsin =

- Town
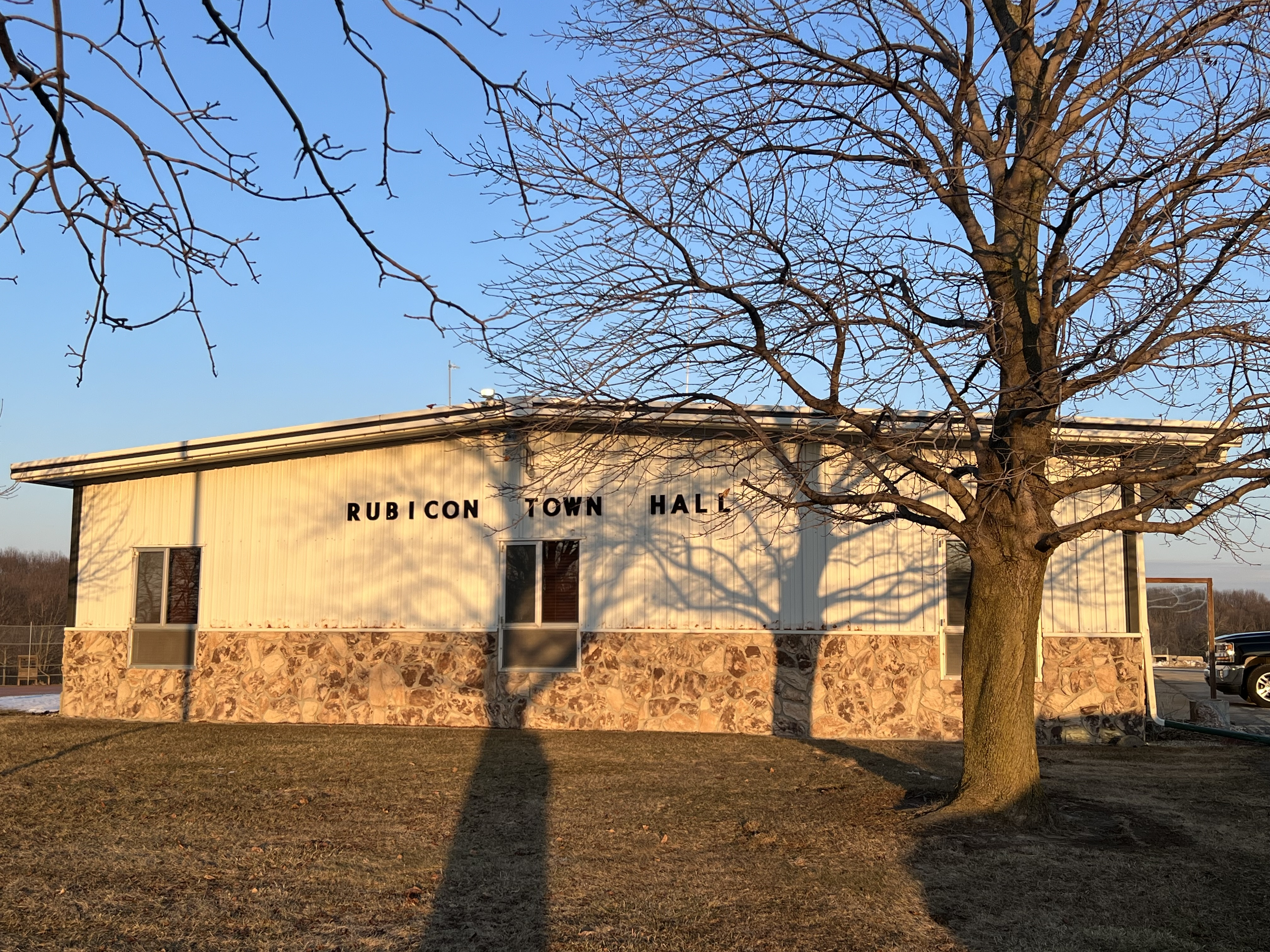
- Rubicon Town Hall

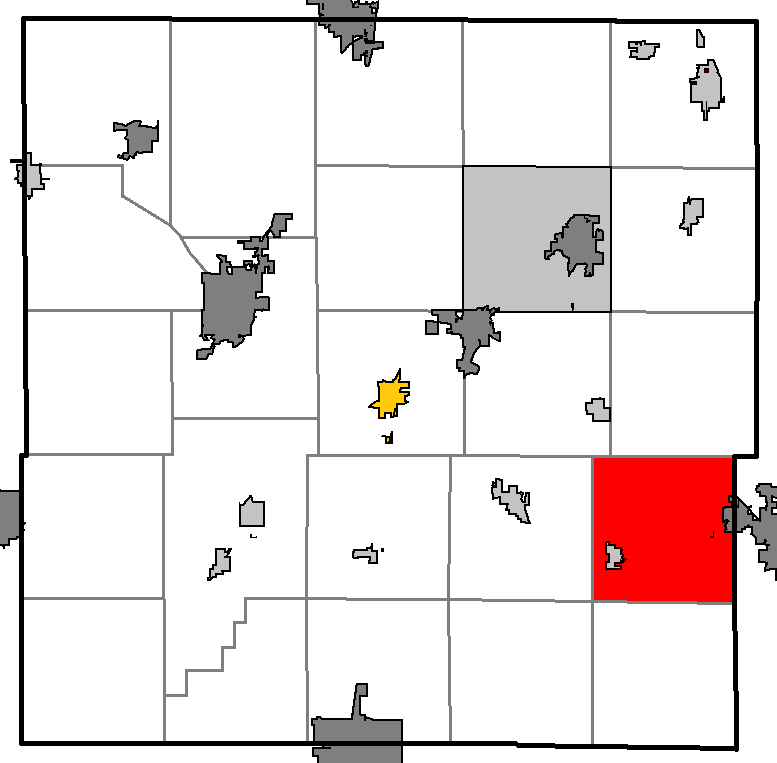
- Location of Rubicon, within Dodge County
- Coordinates: 43°19′58″N 88°28′8″W
- Country: United States
- State: Wisconsin
- County: Dodge

Area
  - Total: 34.9 sq mi (90.5 km^{2})
  - Land: 34.5 sq mi (89.4 km^{2})
  - Water: 0.42 sq mi (1.1 km^{2})
- Elevation: 1,102 ft (336 m)

Population (2020)
  - Total: 2,117
  - Density: 61.3/sq mi (23.7/km^{2})
- Time zone: UTC-6 (Central (CST))
  - Summer (DST): UTC-5 (CDT)
- FIPS code: 55-69962
- GNIS feature ID: 1584072
- Website: https://rubiconwi.gov/

Rubicon is a town in Dodge County, Wisconsin, United States. The population was 2,117 at the 2020 census. The unincorporated communities of Rubicon and Saylesville are located in the town. The unincorporated community of Woodland is also located partially in the town.

== Geography ==
According to the United States Census Bureau, the town has a total area of 34.9 square miles (90.5 km^{2}), of which 34.5 square miles (89.4 km^{2}) is land and 0.4 square mile (1.1 km^{2}) (1.17%) is water.

== Demographics ==
As of the census of 2000, there were 2,005 people, 662 households, and 544 families living in the town. The population density was 58.1 people per square mile (22.4/km^{2}). There were 680 housing units at an average density of 19.7 per square mile (7.6/km^{2}). The racial makeup of the town was 98.70% White, 0.15% African American, 0.05% Native American, 0.10% Asian, 0.15% from other races, and 0.85% from two or more races. Hispanic or Latino of any race were 0.70% of the population.

There were 662 households, out of which 41.4% had children under the age of 18 living with them, 73.9% were married couples living together, 4.7% had a female householder with no husband present, and 17.8% were non-families. 13.3% of all households were made up of individuals, and 5.1% had someone living alone who was 65 years of age or older. The average household size was 3.03 and the average family size was 3.35.

In the town, the population was spread out, with 30.4% under the age of 18, 7.5% from 18 to 24, 29.0% from 25 to 44, 24.4% from 45 to 64, and 8.6% who were 65 years of age or older. The median age was 36 years. For every 100 females, there were 107.1 males. For every 100 females age 18 and over, there were 111.0 males.

The median income for a household in the town was $54,583, and the median income for a family was $59,231. Males had a median income of $37,234 versus $23,359 for females. The per capita income for the town was $20,964. About 2.2% of families and 3.9% of the population were below the poverty line, including 4.8% of those under age 18 and 5.6% of those age 65 or over.

== Notable people ==
- Chester A. Fowler, jurist
- Art Hauser, pro football player
- Edmund J. Labuwi, politician
- William M. Morse, surveyor and politician
