= Neosho, Wisconsin =

- Village
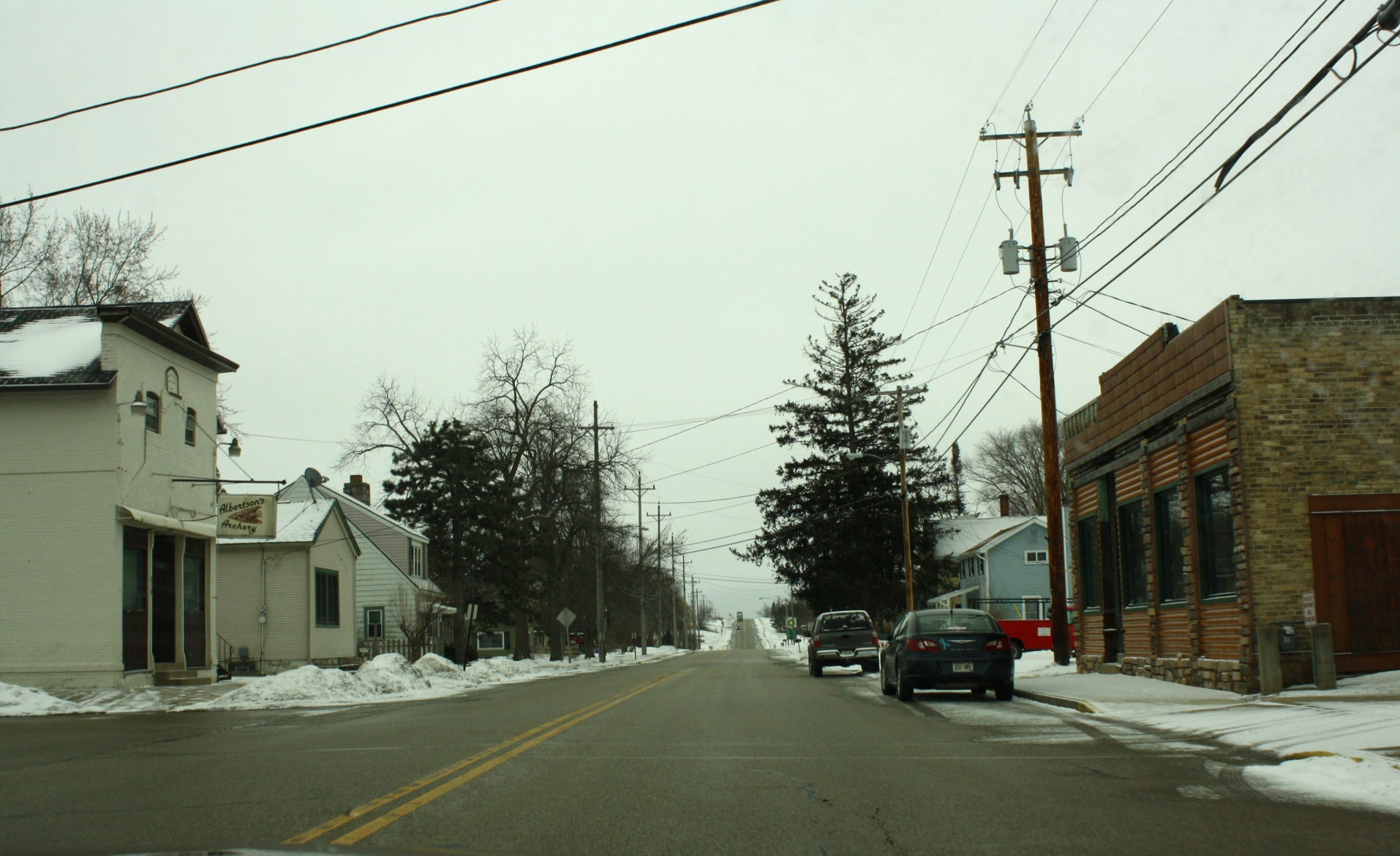
- Looking south in Neosho

- Location of Neosho in Dodge County, Wisconsin.
- Coordinates: 43°18′37″N 88°31′5″W
- Country: United States
- State: Wisconsin
- County: Dodge

Area
  - Total: 0.56 sq mi (1.44 km^{2})
  - Land: 0.53 sq mi (1.36 km^{2})
  - Water: 0.031 sq mi (0.08 km^{2})
- Elevation: 902 ft (275 m)

Population (2020)
  - Total: 591
  - Density: 1,130/sq mi (435/km^{2})
- Time zone: UTC-6 (Central (CST))
  - Summer (DST): UTC-5 (CDT)
- FIPS code: 55-56075
- GNIS feature ID: 1570176
- Website: www.villageofneosho.org

Neosho is a village in Dodge County, Wisconsin, United States. The population was 591 at the 2020 census.

== Geography ==
Neosho is located at 43°18′37″N 88°31′5″W (43.310165, -88.517933).

According to the United States Census Bureau, the village has a total area of 0.55 square miles (1.42 km^{2}), of which 0.52 square miles (1.35 km^{2}) is land and 0.03 square miles (0.08 km^{2}) is water.

== Demographics ==
Historical population
Census	Pop.	Note	%±
1880	197		—
1910	304		—
1920	296		−2.6%
1930	262		−11.5%
1940	255		−2.7%
1950	287		12.5%
1960	345		20.2%
1970	400		15.9%
1980	575		43.8%
1990	658		14.4%
2000	593		−9.9%
2010	574		−3.2%
2020	591		3.0%
U.S. Decennial Census

=== 2010 census ===
As of the census of 2010, there were 574 people, 241 households, and 154 families living in the village. The population density was 1,103.8 inhabitants per square mile (426.2/km^{2}). There were 255 housing units at an average density of 490.4 per square mile (189.3/km^{2}). The racial makeup of the village was 97.2% White, 0.5% African American, 0.7% Native American, 0.2% Asian, and 1.4% from two or more races. Hispanic or Latino of any race were 0.7% of the population.

There were 241 households, of which 29.0% had children under the age of 18 living with them, 49.8% were married couples living together, 9.1% had a female householder with no husband present, 5.0% had a male householder with no wife present, and 36.1% were non-families. 27.4% of all households were made up of individuals, and 5.4% had someone living alone who was 65 years of age or older. The average household size was 2.38 and the average family size was 2.93.

The median age in the village was 42 years. 22.5% of residents were under the age of 18; 7.2% were between the ages of 18 and 24; 27% were from 25 to 44; 34% were from 45 to 64; and 9.1% were 65 years of age or older. The gender makeup of the village was 52.3% male and 47.7% female.

=== 2000 census ===
As of the census of 2000, there were 593 people, 213 households, and 156 families living in the village. The population density was 991.4 people per square mile (381.6/km^{2}). There were 223 housing units at an average density of 372.8 per square mile (143.5/km^{2}). The racial makeup of the village was 98.99% White, 0.67% Native American, and 0.34% from two or more races. Hispanic or Latino of any race were 0.51% of the population.

There were 213 households, out of which 44.6% had children under the age of 18 living with them, 62.4% were married couples living together, 6.1% had a female householder with no husband present, and 26.3% were non-families. 18.8% of all households were made up of individuals, and 7.5% had someone living alone who was 65 years of age or older. The average household size was 2.78 and the average family size was 3.25.

In the village, the population was spread out, with 30.2% under the age of 18, 9.4% from 18 to 24, 32.2% from 25 to 44, 20.9% from 45 to 64, and 7.3% who were 65 years of age or older. The median age was 34 years. For every 100 females, there were 99.7 males. For every 100 females age 18 and over, there were 102.0 males.

The median income for a household in the village was $50,167, and the median income for a family was $50,167. Males had a median income of $38,000 versus $27,031 for females. The per capita income for the village was $19,134. About 0.6% of families and 1.8% of the population were below the poverty line, including 2.2% of those under age 18 and 5.8% of those age 65 or over.

== Notable people ==
- Jesse Clason, Wisconsin physician and legislator, lived in Neosho.
- Dennis Hall, 10 time Greco-Roman Wrestling US National Champion, lived in Neosho.
- Edmund J. Labuwi, Wisconsin businessman and legislator, was President and Supervisor of Neosho.
- Paul Wagner, former Major League Baseball pitcher, lived in Neosho.

== Images ==
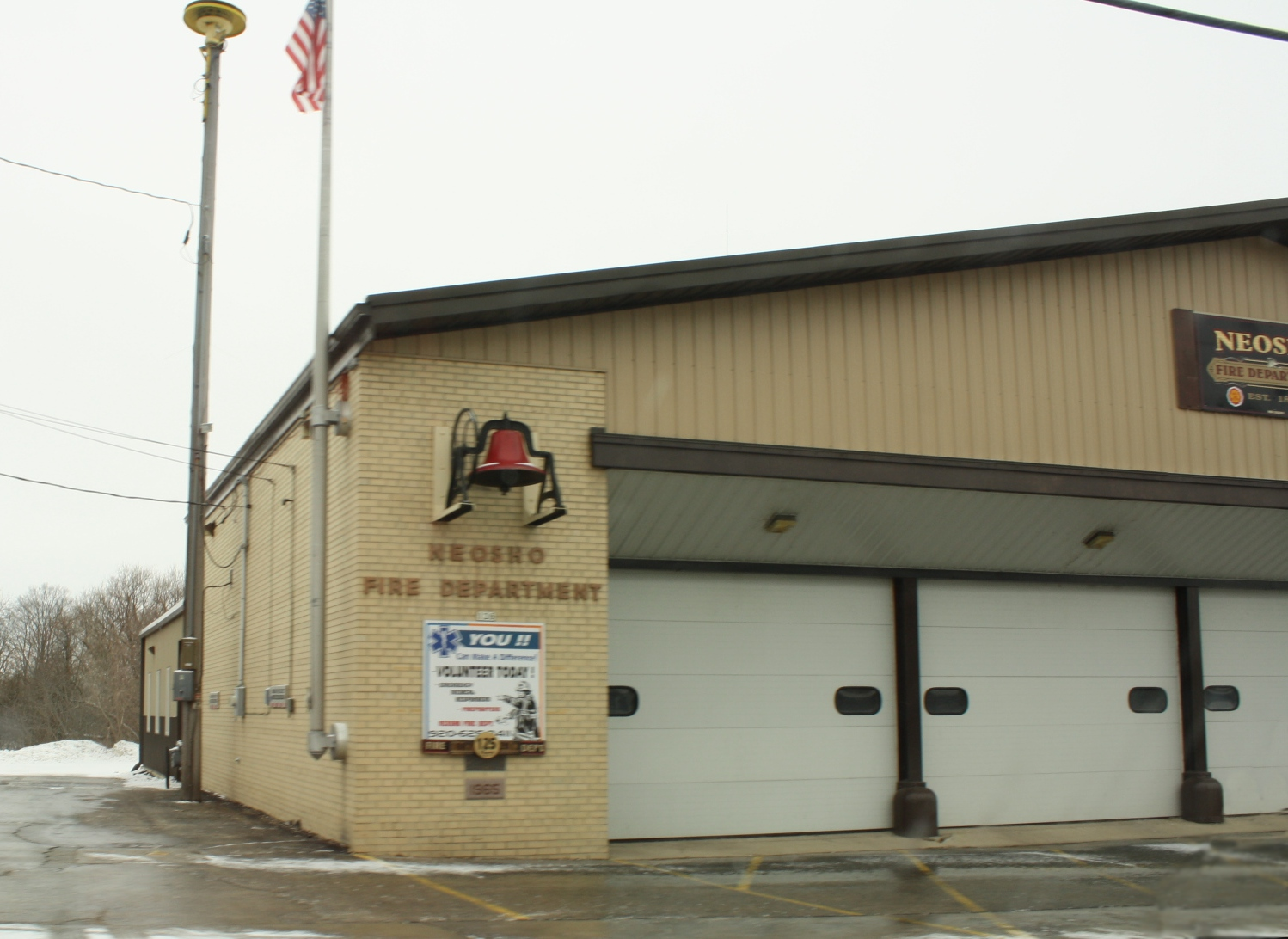
Fire department

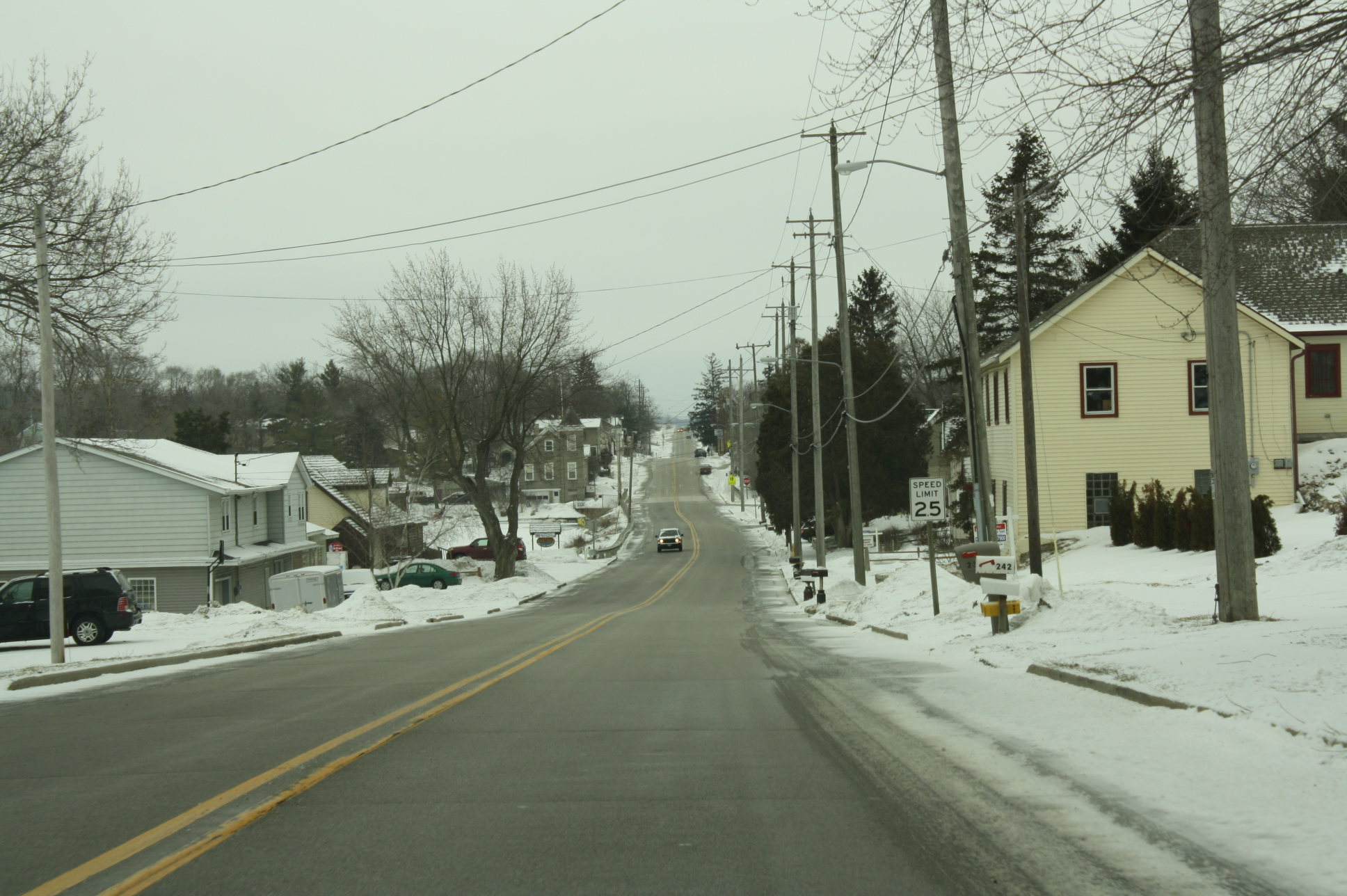
Looking south in Neosho

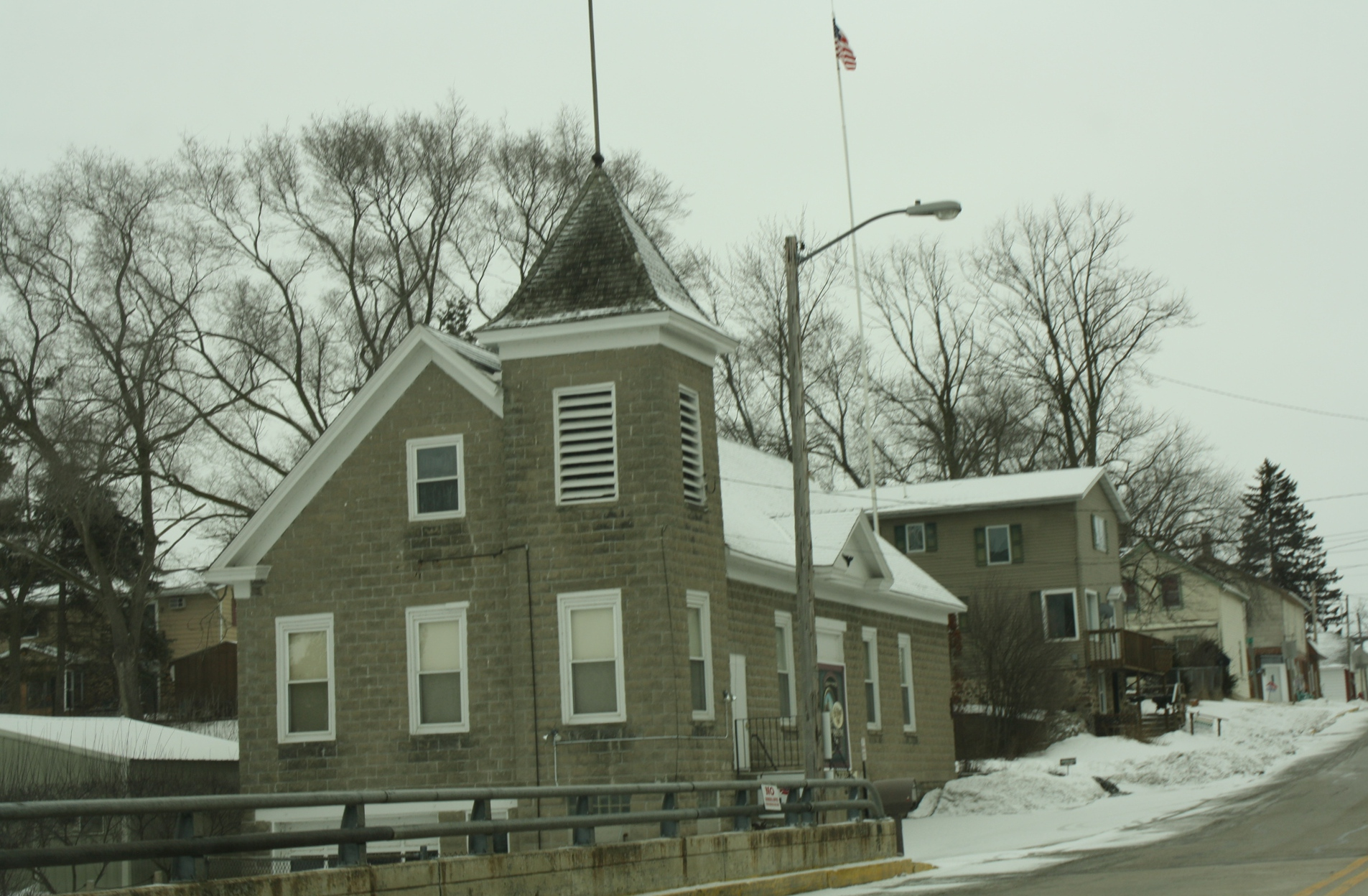
Old Village hall

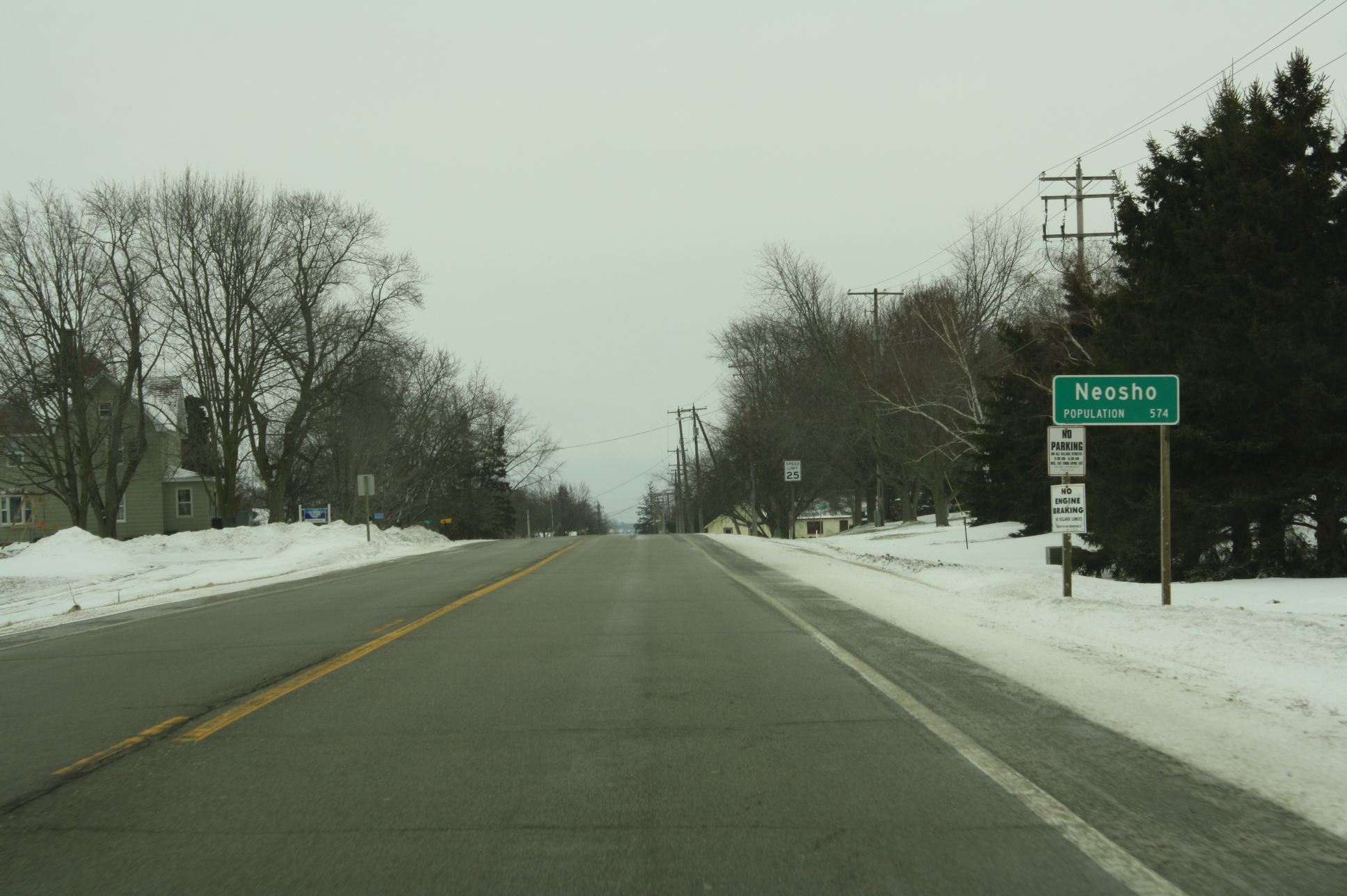
Neosho sign
