= Benjamin Webster (politician) =

American politician

Benjamin Webster (April 14, 1867 – March 15, 1923) was a member of the Wisconsin State Assembly.

== Biography ==
Webster was born on April 14, 1867, in Platteville, Wisconsin. He died there on March 15, 1923.

== Career ==
Webster was a member of the Assembly during the 1917 session. Previously, he had been postmaster of Platteville from 1898 to 1914. At the time of his death, Webster was mayor of Platteville, having been elected in 1922. He was a Republican.
