= Richard Bradley (film producer) =

Australian film producer and publicist

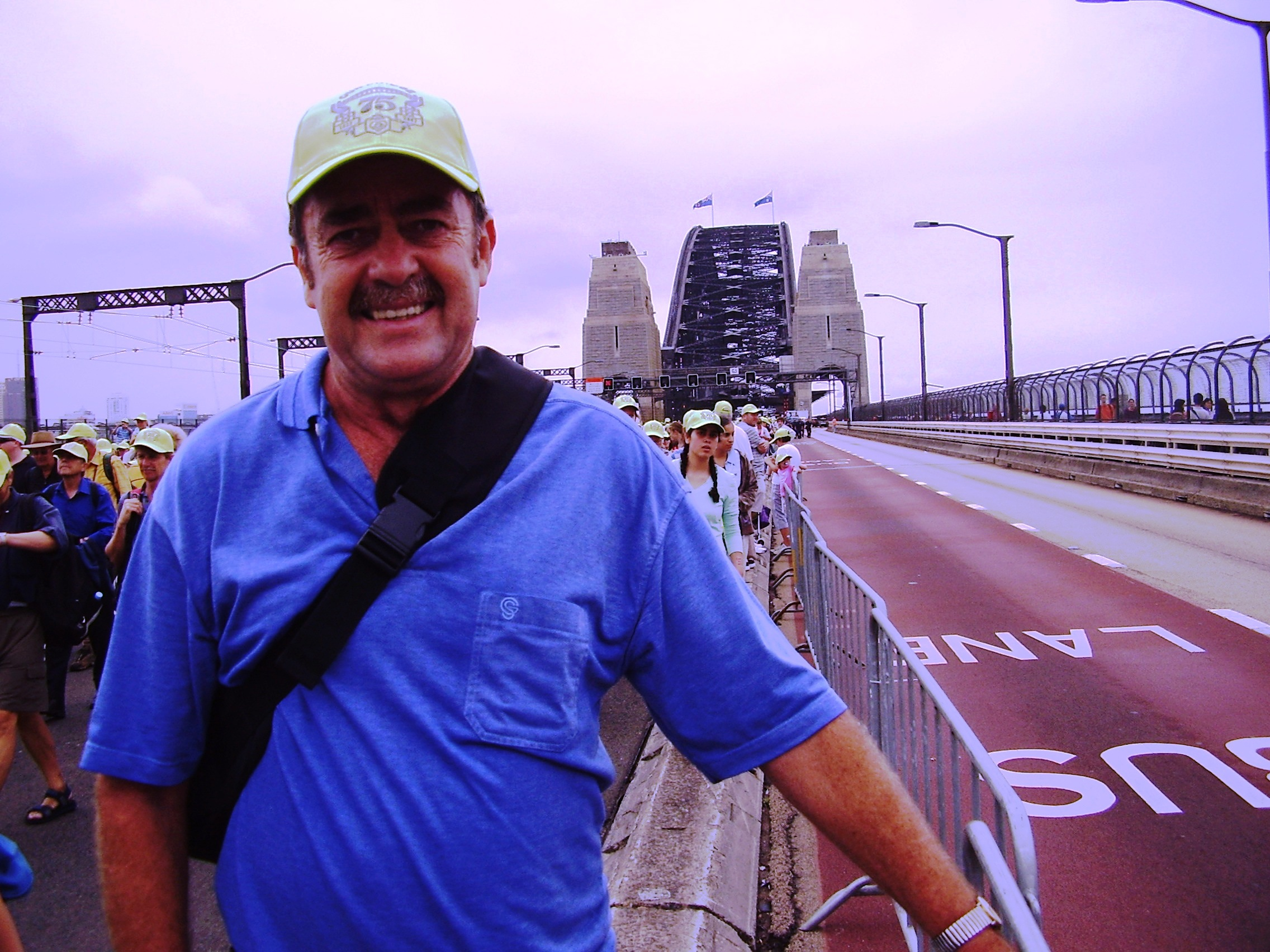
- Born: Richard Bradley
- Occupations: Producer, publicist, scriptwriter
- Years active: 1972–present

Richard Bradley (born 1949) is an Australian film producer and publicist working through his company Richard Bradley Productions which was established in 1981.

== Early life ==
Richard Bradley grew up in North Sydney. After leaving school in 1964 he joined The Sydney Morning Herald as a copyboy and then moved onto Shipping Newspapers where he completed his apprenticeship as a compositor in 1970. During this time he became more interested in film production.

== Early film career ==
In 1972 he started making short films which enabled him to work in the industry full-time. He was also commissioned to produce music clips and short documentaries.

== Middle film career ==
He produced his first feature film, Southern Crossing(1980), which featured jazz greats Dave Brubeck and Herbie Mann. The film was critically acclaimed internationally and enabled him to gain development funding for other feature projects and regular documentary work with The NSW Government Documentary Division. It was during this time he started to niche market into specific areas and in fundraising he produced the award-winning docudrama for the Royal Flying Doctor Service- An Hour and a Half from Anywhere(1989). This film opened new doors to producing over sixty productions which included TV specials, documentaries and commercials. He also secured a co-production with Fuji TV as Australian producer on the comedy adventure The Hitchhiker (1992) which was based on a short story by Roald Dahl and screened extensively in Japan.

== Later film career ==
His first attempt to make the controversial bikie movie, Brothers at War, which had distribution and presales through UIP and Channel 7, but failed to reach production. He then started on a series of Rugby league historical documentaries. The Mighty Bears 6-part series (competed 2005), The Mighty Eels 4-part series (competed 2006) and The Mighty Bulldogs 4-part series (competed 2010). During this time he produced a documentary, Miracle, at the Healing Ministry, and re-released Southern Crossing.

In 2008 he met up with South Australian producer Wayne Groom and, with financial investment from the South Australian Film Corporation, they brought back Brothers at War with director Peter Andrikidis, Paramount Pictures and Arclight Films on board. However the project was rejected for production funding by Screen Australia and a major controversy erupted when it was revealed a conflict of interest could have taken place. Although later declared in favour of Screen Australia, it caused industry outrage after it was publicised in IF Magazine.

In 2012 he produced a series of three cricket documentaries with financial support from Bankstown Cricket Club which included the life stories of Australian test players Graeme Thomas, Steve Smith, Len Pascoe, Mark Waugh and former captain Steve Waugh. His production company was engaged to make the official World War One centenary TV documentary called Headgear to Helmets for the National Rugby League - a three-minute promotional video clip was screened at all NRL matches during the Anzac Day weekend in 2015 on the 100th anniversary of the Gallipoli landings and at the Australia vs New Zealand Test Match. The full documentary was completed in 2018 and first screened on the 100th anniversary of the armistice that ended the war in 1918. He returned to scriptwriting during this time, completing 27 individual screenplays under the umbrella called Travelers Tales which are being marketed internationally, with one called Shadows in Time receiving a CFSC writing award in 2021.

== Publicity work ==
Richard Bradley is also a successful publicist between 1986 and 1992, he was publicist for APASCO an innovative Australian marketing research and information supplier which led to him being appointed as the Australian Media Agent for the internationally renowned American Total Quality Management expert and pioneer Dr W. Edwards Deming.
