= R. H. Bradley =

American politician

R. H. Bradley (born December 12, 1873) was a Canadian-born American politician. He was a member of the Wisconsin State Assembly.

== Biography ==
Bradley was born near Toronto, Ontario, Canada on December 12, 1873. His jobs would include being employed by the Chicago, St. Paul, Minneapolis and Omaha Railway and the Wisconsin Central Railway.

== Political career ==
Bradley was a member of the Assembly during the 1917 session. He was a Republican.
