= John J. Koepsell =

American businessman and politician

John J. Koepsell (September 26, 1853 – March 11, 1925) was an American businessman and politician.

Born in Milwaukee, Wisconsin, Koepsell was in the hardware business. In 1889, Koepsell and his family moved to Sheboygan, Wisconsin where he started his hardware business: J. J. Koepsell Company. The company also had heating, plumbing, and mill supplies. He also served as an assistant factory inspector during the administration of Wisconsin Governor Robert La Follette, Sr. Koepsell served on the school board and was the board president. In 1917, Koepsell served in the Wisconsin State Assembly and was a Republican. Koepsell died at his home in Sheboygan, Wisconsin.
