= Woodmohr, Wisconsin =

- Town
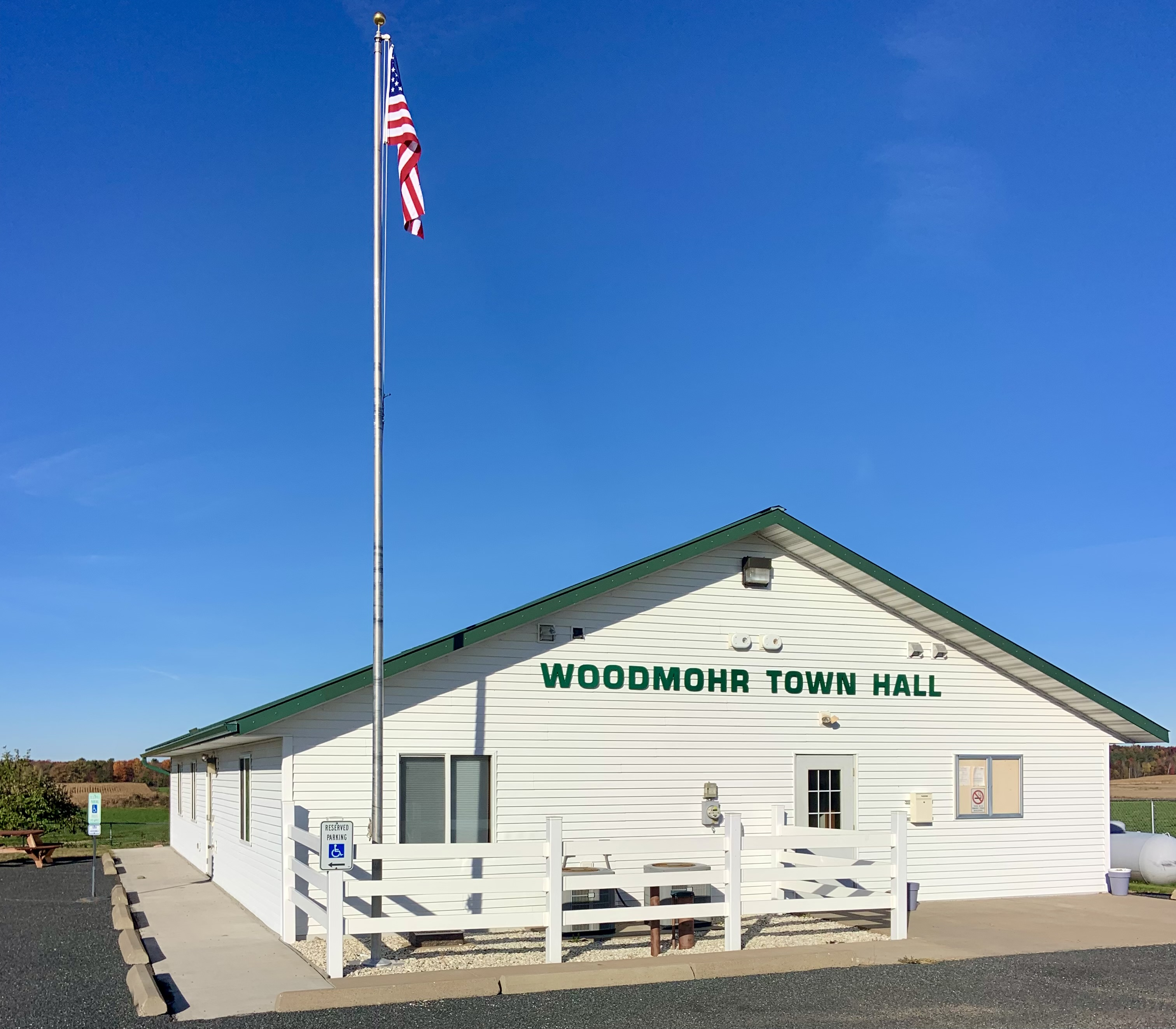
- Town hall

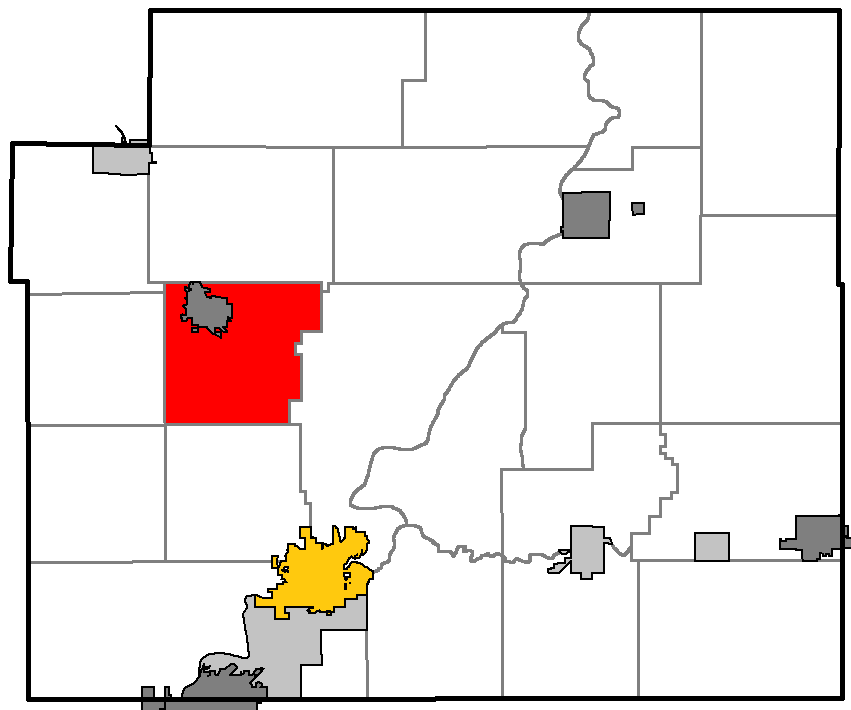
- Location of Woodmohr within Chippewa County

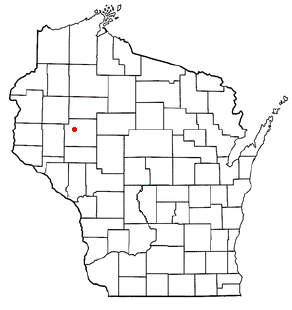
- Location of Woodmohr, Wisconsin
- Coordinates: 45°4′38″N 91°28′27″W
- Country: United States
- State: Wisconsin
- County: Chippewa

Area
  - Total: 35.1 sq mi (90.8 km^{2})
  - Land: 35.0 sq mi (90.7 km^{2})
  - Water: 0.039 sq mi (0.1 km^{2})
- Elevation: 980 ft (300 m)

Population (2020)
  - Total: 1,004
  - Density: 28.7/sq mi (11.1/km^{2})
- Time zone: UTC-6 (Central (CST))
  - Summer (DST): UTC-5 (CDT)
- Area codes: 715 & 534
- FIPS code: 55-88875
- GNIS feature ID: 1584477
- PLSS township: T30N R9W and a bit of T30N R8W
- Website: https://townofwoodmohr.com/

Woodmohr is a town in Chippewa County in the U.S. state of Wisconsin. The population was 1,004 at the 2020 census. The name comes from a blend of the names of Woodard, a state representative and Lawrence Mohr, an old settler.

== Geography ==
The Town of Woodmohr is roughly a 6-mile (10 km) square, with a few notches added and removed. The town is in the west-central part of Chippewa County, and it surrounds the city of Bloomer, a separate municipality. According to the United States Census Bureau, Woodmohr has a total area of 35.1 square miles (90.8 km^{2}), of which 35.0 square miles (90.7 km^{2}) is land and 0.04 square miles (0.1 km^{2}), or 0.15%, is water.

== History ==
The outline of the six-mile square that would become most of Woodmohr was first surveyed in late 1848 by a crew working for the U.S. government. In September 1849, another crew marked all the section corners of the six mile squares, walking through the woods and wading the streams, measuring with chain and compass. When done, the deputy surveyor filed this general description:

The East side of this Township including Sections 1, 12, 13, 24, 25 & 36; and parts of Sections 3, 11, 14, 23, 26 & 35 are well Timbered and have a productive sand & loam soil. Sections 17, 18, 19, 20, 29 and 30, and parts of sections 7, 8, 16, 21 & 28 are covered with Aspen thickets and Oak Brush with a soil similar to the East side of the Township The remainder of the lands lying along the Streams in the center and South West part are mostly Bur Oak & Pitch(?) Pine Openings having a more sandy soil than(?) the more thickly timbered portions.

== Demographics ==
Historical population
| Census | Pop. | Note | %± |
|---|---|---|---|
| 1990 | 1,086 | | — |
| 2000 | 883 | | −18.7% |
| 2010 | 932 | | 5.5% |
| 2020 | 1,004 | | 7.7% |

As of the census of 2000, there were 883 people, 319 households, and 262 families residing in the town. The population density was 25.0 people per square mile (9.7/km^{2}). There were 331 housing units at an average density of 9.4 per square mile (3.6/km^{2}). The racial makeup of the town was 99.32% White, 0.45% Asian, and 0.23% from two or more races. Hispanic or Latino of any race were 0.11% of the population.

There were 319 households, out of which 39.5% had children under the age of 18 living with them, 73.7% were married couples living together, 4.7% had a female householder with no husband present, and 17.6% were non-families. 15.4% of all households were made up of individuals, and 6.3% had someone living alone who was 65 years of age or older. The average household size was 2.77 and the average family size was 3.08.

In the town, the population was spread out, with 27.2% under the age of 18, 6.30% from 18 to 24, 28.5% from 25 to 44, 25.7% from 45 to 64, and 12.2% who were 65 years of age or older. The median age was 39 years. For every 100 females, there were 105.8 males. For every 100 females age 18 and over, there were 104.1 males.

The median income for a household in the town was $47,500, and the median income for a family was $55,347. Males had a median income of $30,769 versus $21,688 for females. The per capita income for the town was $21,045. About 2.80% of families and 5.60% of the population were below the poverty line, including 3.50% of those under age 18 and 7.10% of those age 65 or over.
