= The Mighty Bears =

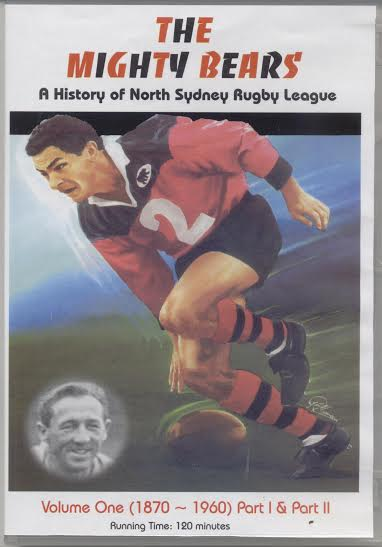
- Directed by: Richard Bradley
- Country of origin: Australia

Production
- Executive producer: North Sydney Leagues Club
- Producer: Richard Bradley
- Cinematography: Jack Wilson
- Editors: Richard Bradley, Kristian Anderson, Ben Broad
- Running time: 13 hours in 6 parts
- Production company: Richard Bradley Productions

Original release
- Release: March 2002 – October 2005

The Mighty Bears is an Australian DVD series that focuses on the sporting history of the North Sydney District Rugby League Football Club, also known under the team name of the North Sydney Bears. The series, which comprises six volumes spanning from 1870 to 1999, was financed by North Sydney Leagues Club and Richard Bradley Productions who also produced the series.

== Synopsis ==
The series tells the story from 1870 when team sport such as cricket started in Australia to 1908 when North Sydney became a foundation member of the newly created Rugby League Football in Australia right through the 20th century to their very last game in 1999 at North Sydney Oval.(After this time as a result of Super League the club was forced into a failed joint venture and now plays in the New South Wales Rugby League. They are making attempts to rejoin the main National Rugby League competition).

Production of the six part series commenced in 1998 and was completed in 2005. The narrative was told through interviews with 58 famous players, coaches, officials, supporters, families and historians. These interviews were all inter cut to tell the narrative in first person. The first eye witness accounts to be filmed start at 1913 of a game between North Sydney and Glebe at North Sydney Oval.

== Reception ==
The series was also critically acclaimed in the media with the late prominent novelist and play writer Alex Buzo calling it “…a masterpiece of its kind…” in his review published in The Sydney Morning Herald in January 2003 shortly after the first volumes were released in 2002. Although Mr. Buzo was a Bears fan, the continuing sales of the series years after completion does give this some sort of credibility.

The success of the series created two other similar series from the producer “The Mighty Eels” and “The Mighty Bulldogs”.

The six Mighty Bears DVD volumes are 1870-1960; 1960-1970; 1970-1980; 1980-1985; 1985-1990 and 1990-1999. The entire series has a running time of 13 hours.
