= P. Walter Petersen =

American politician (1878–1958)

P. Walter Petersen (March 31, 1878 – June 15, 1958) was an American businessman, politician and Danish diplomat.

Born in Odense, Denmark, Petersen emigrated to the United States in 1898 and settled in Racine, Wisconsin. He was in the real estate, banking, and house building business in Racine, Wisconsin. He served on the Racine County, Wisconsin, Board of Supervisors and was chairman of the county board. In 1917, Petersen served in the Wisconsin State Assembly and was a Republican. Later. Petersen served on the Wisconsin Highway Commission and was chairman of the commission. In 1933, Petersen moved with his wife to St. Petersburg, Florida, because of his wife's health. From 1939 until 1955, Petersen served as Danish vice counsel. Petersen died in St. Petersburg, Florida.
