= Charles A. Beggs =

American politician from Wisconsin

Charles A. Beggs (November 1, 1860 – November 2, 1939) was an American politician and businessman who served on the Wisconsin State Assembly.

== Early life ==
Born in Plainfield, Wisconsin, Beggs attended public school and spent his early years operating potato warehouses in Waushara and Portage Counties, Wisconsin. He was also involved with the retail mercantile business in Rice Lake, Barron County, Wisconsin.

== Career ==
Beggs began his career in public office in 1917, at the age of 57. He was elected as a Democrat to represent his county in the lower house of the state legislature. However, early on, Beggs became involved with the Wisconsin Progressive Party, led by United States Senator Robert M. La Follette, Sr. Beggs was a leader among those oppoed to censoring the late Senator La Follette for his opposition to the United States' participation in World War II.

During his tenure, Beggs served for three session as chairman of the joint committee on finance, and was a member of the state emergency board. He was re-elected multiple times before retiring after the close of the 1937 legislative session. Additionally, Beggs served as a member of the Barron county board for more than 25 years and as president of the village of Cameron, Wisconsin for eight years.

== Personal life ==
Beggs married his first wife, Mayvorite Booth on April 23, 1883. She and their three children preceded him in death. On December 1, 1936, Beggs married Grace Wenger.

After his term ended in the Wisconsin Legislature, Beggs and his family moved from Rice Lake to Madison, Wisconsin. Beggs died suddenly of a heart attack the day after his seventy-ninth birthday at his home in Madison. He was buried in Cameron, Wisconsin. His son Lyall T. Beggs also served in the Wisconsin Assembly.
