= 50th Wisconsin Legislature =

Wisconsin legislative term for 1911–1912

←	49th	51st	→
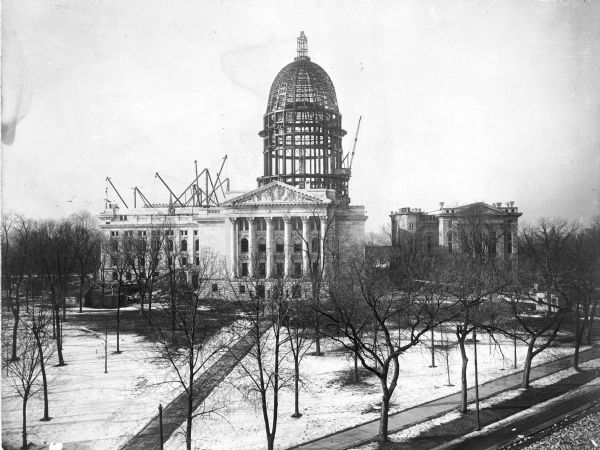
- Wisconsin State Capitol under reconstruction after the 1904 fire

Overview
- Legislative body: Wisconsin Legislature
- Meeting place: Wisconsin State Capitol
- Term: January 2, 1911 – January 6, 1913
- Election: November 8, 1910

Senate
- Members: 33
- Senate President: Thomas Morris (R)
- President pro tempore: Harry C. Martin (R)
- Party control: Republican

Assembly
- Members: 100
- Assembly Speaker: C. A. Ingram (R)
- Party control: Republican

Sessions
- 1st: January 11, 1911 – July 15, 1911

Special sessions
- Apr. 1912 Spec.: April 30, 1912 – May 6, 1912

The Fiftieth Wisconsin Legislature convened from January 11, 1911, to July 15, 1911, in regular session, and re-convened in a special session from April 30, 1912, to May 6, 1912. During this term, legislative business was largely held in the north wing of the Wisconsin State Capitol, which was the only part of the capitol to remain intact after the 1904 fire.

This session was notable for the implementation of Wisconsin's first income tax—the first income tax in the United States.

This session was also the high water mark for the Social Democratic Party in Wisconsin, representing 12 of Milwaukee County's 16 districts in the Assembly, and 2 of Milwaukee County's 5 Senate districts.

Senators representing odd-numbered districts were newly elected for this session and were serving the first two years of a four-year term. Assembly members were elected to a two-year term. Assembly members and odd-numbered senators were elected in the general election of November 8, 1910. Senators representing even-numbered districts were serving the third and fourth year of a four-year term, having been elected in the general election of November 3, 1908.

The governor of Wisconsin during this entire term was Republican Francis E. McGovern, of Milwaukee County, serving a two-year term, having won election in the 1910 Wisconsin gubernatorial election.

== Major events ==
- January 2, 1911: Inauguration of Francis E. McGovern as the 22nd Governor of Wisconsin.
- January 21, 1911: The National Progressive Republican League was founded in the home of Wisconsin's senior United States senator Robert M. La Follette, unofficially launching his campaign for the Republican nomination for President of the United States.
- January 24, 1911: Robert M. La Follette was re-elected as United States Senator by the Wisconsin Legislature in joint session.
- January 26, 1911: The United States and Canada announced their first reciprocal trade agreement.
- March 25, 1911: The Triangle Shirtwaist Factory fire occurred in New York City, resulting in 146 deaths.
- May 15, 1911: The United States Supreme Court published their decision in Standard Oil Co. of New Jersey v. United States, finding that Standard Oil was in violation of the Sherman Antitrust Act and would therefore be dissolved into 34 new companies.
- September 12, 1911: Wisconsin Governor Francis E. McGovern became chairman of the National Governors Association.
- September 29, 1911: The Kingdom of Italy declared war on the Ottoman Empire to claim territory in north Africa.
- November 4, 1911: The Morocco–Congo Treaty was agreed between the German Empire, the French Republic, and the Kingdom of Spain, redrawing significant parts of the map of Africa.
- January 1, 1912: The Republic of China was established.
- January 23, 1912: The First International Opium Convention was agreed at The Hague, signed by the German Empire, the United States, the Republic of China, the French Republic, the United Kingdom, the Kingdom of Italy, the Empire of Japan, the Kingdom of the Netherlands, the State of Persia, the Portuguese Republic, the Russian Empire, and the Kingdom of Siam.
- April 14, 1912: The RMS Titanic struck an iceberg in the north Atlantic and sunk, resulting in more than 1,500 deaths.
- June 6, 1912: The Novarupta volcano in the Alaska Territory experienced a VEI 6 eruption—the most powerful volcanic eruption of the 20th century.
- June 20, 1912: At the 1912 Republican National Convention, Progressive supporters of Theodore Roosevelt and Robert M. La Follette bolted the party after two days of acrimony over disputed delegate slates.
- August 4, 1912: U.S. marines landed in Nicaragua at the request of the Nicaraguan Conservative Party government, beginning a 20-year occupation of Nicaragua.
- October 8, 1912: The Kingdom of Montenegro declared war against the Ottoman Empire, initiating the First Balkan War.
- October 14, 1912: John Flammang Schrank shot presidential candidate and former U.S. President Theodore Roosevelt during a campaign event in Milwaukee. Roosevelt survived, but the bullet remained in his chest for the rest of his life.
- November 5, 1912: 1912 United States general election:
  - Woodrow Wilson elected President of the United States
  - Francis E. McGovern re-elected as Governor of Wisconsin
  - Wisconsin voters approved an amendment to the state constitution to allow the Legislature to set judges' salaries and payment schedule.
  - Wisconsin voters approved an amendment to the state constitution to allow cities and counties to exceed their debt caps to purchase land for public improvements.
  - Wisconsin voters approved an amendment to the state constitution to allow municipalities to purchase land for public improvements.

== Major legislation ==
- March 2, 1911: An Act to provide for the nomination of judicial officers in the counties having a population of over one hundred thousand inhabitants by a non-partisan primary election, 1911 Act 4.
- April 29, 1911: An Act to create sections 1408a to 1408d, inclusive, of the statutes, relating to the prevention and control of dangerous communicable diseases, 1911 Act 44. Gave additional powers and responsibilities to state and local public health officials.
- May 3, 1911: An Act ... relating to the liability of employers for injuries or death sustained by their employees, providing for compensation for the accidental injury or death of employees, establishing an industrial accident board, defining its powers, providing for a review of its awards, and making an appropriation to carry out the provisions of this act, 1911 Act 50.
- June 5, 1911: An Act to amend section 12 of the statutes, extending the right of suffrage to women, 1911 Act 227.
- June 30, 1911: An Act ... creating an industrial commission, transferring to such commission the powers and duties of the commissioner of labor and the bureau of labor and industrial statistics, and superseding the industrial accident board created by chapter 50, of the laws of 1911, and granting such commission certain other powers, and providing for safe and hygienic conditions, and making an appropriation therefor ..., 1911 Act 485. Created the Wisconsin Industrial Commission.
- July 13, 1911: An Act ... relating to taxation of incomes, and making an appropriation therefor, 1911 Act 658. Created Wisconsin's first income tax—the first income tax in the United States.
- July 15, 1911: An Act to repeal sections 9, 10 and 11 of the statutes, and to create three new sections to be designated sections 9, 10 and 11 of the statutes, relating to re-apportionment of the state into senate, assembly and congressional districts, 1911 Act 661.
- Joint Resolution to amend section 10, article VII, of the constitution, relating to the salary of judges, 1911 Joint Resolution 24. Second legislative passage of the proposed amendment to the state constitution to give the Legislature the power to set judicial salaries and pay schedules. This amendment was ratified by voters in the 1912 Fall election.
- Joint Amendment ratifying the sixteenth amendment to the constitution of the United States, 1911 Joint Resolution 25.
- Joint Resolution memorializing Congress to take proper steps for the adoption of an amendment to the federal Constitution providing that such Constitution may hereafter be amended by the initiative, 1911 Joint Resolution 29. Called for a federal constitutional amendment to allow future amendments to be initiated by citizen petition.
- Joint Resolution memorializing Congress to take proper steps toward a Constitutional amendment providing for initiative, referendum, and recall, 1911 Joint Resolution 30. Called for a federal constitutional amendment to allow legislation to be initiated by petition, and for federal officials to be recalled by petition.
- Joint Resolution to amend article XI of the constitution, by adding thereto a new section to be known as section 3b, relating to the acquisition of land by municipalities, 1911 Joint Resolution 37. Proposed an amendment to the state constitution to expand powers of municipalities to purchase land, and delegating to the Legislature the power to set parameters around these powers.
- Joint Resolution to amend Article XIII of the Constitution providing for the recall of public officers, 1911 Joint Resolution 41. Proposed a constitutional amendment to allow citizen petitions for recall of state elected officials.
- Joint Resolution to amend section 3 of article XI of the Constitution, relating to municipal corporations and their indebtedness, 1911 Joint Resolution 42. Second legislative passage of the proposed amendment to the state constitution to allow municipalities to exceed debt limits for the purpose of buying land for public improvements. This amendment was ratified by voters in the 1912 Fall election.
- Joint Resolution to amend section 10 of article VIII of the constitution, relating to internal improvements, 1911 Joint Resolution 47. This was a second attempt at to propose an amendment to the state constitution to authorize state funding for certain public improvements after the previous amendment was rejected by voters in 1910. This amendment was ratified by voters in the 1912 Fall election.
- Joint Resolution to amend article XI of the constitution by adding thereto a new section to be known as section 3a, relating to the acquisition of lands by the state or pay of its cities for certain public purposes, 1911 Joint Resolution 48. Second legislative passage of a proposed amendment to the state constitution to allow municipalities to purchase land for public improvements. This amendment was ratified by voters in the 1912 Fall election.
- Joint Resolution to add section 13, to article VIII, of the constitution, relating to state insurance, 1911 Joint Resolution 56. Proposed an amendment to the state constitution to enable the state to grant insurance by methods to be prescribed in legislation.
- Joint Resolution to create seetion 11 of article VIII of the Constitution, relating to state insurance, 1911 Joint Resolution 65. Proposed an amendment to the state constitution to enable the state to set up insurance and annuities by methods prescribed in legislation.
- Joint Resolution to amend section 21, of article IV, of the constitution, relating to compensation of members of the legislature, 1911 Joint Resolution 66. This was another attempt to raise the compensation of state legislators after the previous attempt was rejected by voters in 1910.
- Joint Resolution to amend sections 6 and 7, of article VII, of the constitution of the state of Wisconsin, relating to circuit judges, 1911 Joint Resolution 67. Proposed an amendment to the state constitution to grant the Legislature the option to decrease the number of circuits in the Wisconsin circuit court system.
- Joint Resolution to amend section 1, article XII of the constitution, providing for the submission of amendments to the constitution by the legislature upon a three-fifths vote of the members elected, 1911 Joint Resolution 71. Proposed an amendment to the state constitution to allow a fast track for future amendments if they clear a 60% threshold in the Legislature.
- Joint Resolution to amend section 1, of article IV of the constitution, to give to the people the power to propose laws and to enact or reject the same at the polls, and to approve or reject at the polls any act of the legislature; and to create section 3, of article XII of the constitution, providing for the submission of amendments to the constitution upon the petition of the people, 1911 Joint Resolution 74. Proposed an amendment to the state constitution to allow citizens to propose or reject legislation by petition and referendum.
- May 6, 1912: An Act to create sections 35–20 to 35–24, inclusive, of the statutes, providing for nonpartisan nominations and elections in cities, 1912 Special Session Act 11. Extended the nonpartisan primary system to local offices.
- May 6, 1912: An Act to amend sections 94–20, 94–21 and 94–22 of the statutes, relating to elections, 1912 Special Session Act 11. Establishing filing deadlines for candidates seeking office respecting new primary schedules.

== Party summary ==
=== Senate summary ===
Senate partisan composition Democratic: 4 seats Social Dem.: 2 seats Republican: 27 seats

	Party (Shading indicates majority caucus)			Total	
	Dem.	S.D.	Rep.	Total	Vacant
End of previous Legislature	4	1	28	33	0
Start of 1st Session	4	2	27	33	0
From December 21, 1911 (Note: Republican James A. Wright (30th District) died December 21, 1911.)	4	2	26	32	1
Final voting share	18.75%		81.25%		
Beginning of the next Legislature	7	1	25	33	0

=== Assembly summary ===
Assembly partisan composition Democratic: 29 seats Social Dem.: 12 seats Republican: 59 seats

	Party (Shading indicates majority caucus)			Total	
	Dem.	S.D.	Rep.	Total	Vacant
End of previous Legislature	17	3	79	99	1
Start of 1st Session	29	12	59	100	0
Final voting share	41%		59%		
Beginning of the next Legislature	35	6	59	100	0

== Sessions ==
- 1st Regular session: January 11, 1911 – July 15, 1911
- April 1912 Special session: April 30, 1912 – May 6, 1912

== Leaders ==
=== Senate leadership ===
- President of the Senate: Thomas Morris (R)
- President pro tempore: Harry C. Martin (R–Darlington)

=== Assembly leadership ===
- Speaker of the Assembly: C. A. Ingram (R–Durand)

== Members ==
=== Members of the Senate ===
Members of the Senate for the Fiftieth Wisconsin Legislature:

Dist.	Counties	Senator	Residence	Party
01	Door, Kewaunee, & Marinette	M. W. Perry	Algoma	Rep.
02	Brown & Oconto	Timothy Burke	Green Bay	Rep.
03	Kenosha & Racine	Isaac T. Bishop	Somers	Rep.
04	Milwaukee (Northern Part)	Henry Bodenstab	Milwaukee	Rep.
05	Milwaukee (City Center)	George J. Weigle	Milwaukee	Rep.
06	Milwaukee (City Northwest)	Winfield R. Gaylord	Milwaukee	Soc.D.
07	Milwaukee (Southern & Western County)	Gabriel Zophy	Milwaukee	Soc.D.
08	Milwaukee (City South)	John C. Kleczka	Milwaukee	Rep.
09	Adams, Marquette, Waushara, & Wood	Edward F. Kileen	Wautoma	Rep.
10	Pierce & St. Croix	Walter C. Owen	Maiden Rock	Rep.
11	Burnett, Douglas, & Polk	Victor Linley	Superior	Rep.
12	Ashland, Bayfield, Price, Sawyer, Taylor, & Washburn	Albert W. Sanborn	Ashland	Rep.
13	Dodge	Paul O. Husting	Mayville	Dem.
14	Outagamie & Shawano	J. Elmer Lehr	Appleton	Rep.
15	Calumet & Manitowoc	Samuel W. Randolph	Manitowoc	Dem.
16	Crawford & Grant	John J. Blaine	Boscobel	Rep.
17	Green, Iowa, & Lafayette	Harry C. Martin	Darlington	Rep.
18	Fond du Lac & Green Lake	Edward H. Lyons	Fond du Lac	Rep.
19	Winnebago	Merritt F. White	Winneconne	Rep.
20	Ozaukee & Sheboygan	Henry Krumrey	Plymouth	Rep.
21	Portage & Waupaca	Edward E. Browne	Waupaca	Rep.
22	Rock	John M. Whitehead	Janesville	Rep.
23	Jefferson & Walworth	Charles A. Snover	Fort Atkinson	Dem.
24	Chippewa, Eau Claire, & Rusk	John W. Thomas	Chippewa Falls	Rep.
25	Clark & Marathon	W. W. Albers	Wausau	Dem.
26	Dane	John S. Donald	Mount Horeb	Rep.
27	Columbia & Sauk	John M. True	Baraboo	Rep.
28	Richland, & Vernon	David G. James	Richland Center	Rep.
29	Barron, Buffalo, Dunn, & Pepin	George E. Scott	Prairie Farm	Rep.
30	Florence, Forest, Iron, Langlade, Lincoln, Oneida, & Vilas	James A. Wright (died December 21, 1911)	Merrill	Rep.
30	Florence, Forest, Iron, Langlade, Lincoln, Oneida, & Vilas	--Vacant from December 21, 1911--		
31	Jackson, Juneau, & Monroe	Howard Teasdale	Sparta	Rep.
32	La Crosse & Trempealeau	Otto Bosshard	La Crosse	Rep.
33	Washington & Waukesha	George E. Hoyt	Menomonee Falls	Rep.

=== Members of the Assembly ===
Members of the Assembly for the Fiftieth Wisconsin Legislature:

Senate District	County	Dist.	Representative	Party	Residence
09	Adams & Marquette		George W. Bingham	Rep.	Friendship
12	Ashland		Ove H. Berg	Rep.	Ashland
29	Barron		Andrew Gulickson	Rep.	Stanley
12	Bayfield, Sawyer, & Washburn		William Knight	Rep.	Bayfield
02	Brown	1	E. A. Raymond	Rep.	Green Bay
02	Brown	2	Henry J. Janssen	Dem.	De Pere
29	Buffalo & Pepin		C. A. Ingram	Rep.	Durand
11	Burnett & Polk		Axel Johnson	Rep.	Apple River
15	Calumet		Lewis Rupp	Dem.	Charlestown
24	Chippewa & Rusk	1	Thomas A. Roycraft	Rep.	Lafayette
24	Chippewa & Rusk	2	Chris P. Ellingson	Rep.	Hawkins
25	Clark		Fred W. Draper	Rep.	Loyal
27	Columbia	1	Andrew Stevenson	Rep.	Arlington
27	Columbia	2	Elmer E. Haight	Rep.	Lowville
16	Crawford		Albert H. Long	Dem.	
26	Dane	1	C. A. Harper	Rep.	Madison
26	Dane	2	Otto Onstad	Rep.	Christiana
26	Dane	3	Arthur H. Sholts	Rep.	Oregon
13	Dodge	1	Charles Lentz	Dem.	Herman
13	Dodge	2	Henry E. Krueger	Dem.	Beaver Dam
01	Door		Lewis L. Johnson	Rep.	Clay Banks
11	Douglas	1	James B. French	Rep.	Superior
11	Douglas	2	Ray J. Nye	Rep.	Superior
29	Dunn		James D. Millar	Rep.	Menomonie
24	Eau Claire	1	Julius C. Gilbertson	Rep.	Eau Claire
24	Eau Claire	2	Taylor Frye	Rep.	Fairchild
30	Florence, Forest, & Langlade		William Reader	Rep.	Peck
18	Fond du Lac	1	Christian Pickart	Dem.	Marshfield
18	Fond du Lac	2	Roy E. Reed	Rep.	Ripon
16	Grant	1	Allen Wells	Rep.	
16	Grant	2	David Schreiner	Rep.	Lancaster
17	Green		Willis Ludlow	Dem.	Monroe
18	Green Lake		Newcomb Spoor	Rep.	Berlin
17	Iowa		Thomas M. Evans	Dem.	Highland
30	Iron, Oneida, & Vilas		Daniel B. Stevens	Rep.	Rhinelander
31	Jackson		Merlin Hull	Rep.	Black River Falls
23	Jefferson	1	C. F. Viebahn	Dem.	Watertown
23	Jefferson	2	Oscar F. Roessler	Dem.	Jefferson
31	Juneau		H. J. Mortensen	Rep.	New Lisbon
03	Kenosha		Mathias J. Scholey	Dem.	Kenosha
01	Kewaunee		August Fenske	Dem.	Ahnapee
32	La Crosse	1	John E. McConnell	Rep.	La Crosse
32	La Crosse	2	E. J. Kneen	Dem.	Bangor
17	Lafayette		Eugene D. Parkinson	Dem.	Fayette
30	Lincoln		John O'Day	Dem.	Merrill
15	Manitowoc	1	Carl Hansen	Dem.	Manitowoc
15	Manitowoc	2	Anton D. Strouf	Dem.	Kossuth
25	Marathon	1	Nicholas Schmidt	Dem.	Marathon City
25	Marathon	2	Arthur J. Plowman	Dem.	Elderon
01	Marinette	1	Christ Johnson	Rep.	Marinette
01	Marinette	2	E. O. Thomas	Rep.	Peshtigo
04	Milwaukee	1	Erich C. Stern	Rep.	Milwaukee
05	Milwaukee	2	W. J. Gilboy	Soc.D.	Milwaukee
07	Milwaukee	3	Frank Metcalfe	Soc.D.	Milwaukee
05	Milwaukee	4	Carl H. Dorner	Rep.	Milwaukee
08	Milwaukee	5	Jacob Hahn	Soc.D.	Milwaukee
05	Milwaukee	6	Chauncey W. Yockey	Rep.	Milwaukee
07	Milwaukee	7	Charles B. Perry	Rep.	Wauwatosa
08	Milwaukee	8	James Vint	Soc.D.	Milwaukee
06	Milwaukee	9	Edmund J. Berner	Soc.D.	Milwaukee
06	Milwaukee	10	Arthur Kahn	Soc.D.	Milwaukee
08	Milwaukee	11	Frederick Brockhausen	Soc.D.	Milwaukee
06	Milwaukee	12	Max E. Binner	Soc.D.	Milwaukee
04	Milwaukee	13	George Klenzendorff	Soc.D.	Milwaukee
07	Milwaukee	14	Michael Katzban	Soc.D.	Milwaukee
04	Milwaukee	15	Edward H. Kiefer	Soc.D.	Milwaukee
06	Milwaukee	16	Frank J. Weber	Soc.D.	Milwaukee
31	Monroe		John R. Jones	Rep.	Leon
02	Oconto		Robert Hintz	Rep.	Underhill
14	Outagamie	1	Clinton B. Ballard	Rep.	Grand Chute
14	Outagamie	2	William M. Rohan	Dem.	Buchanan
20	Ozaukee		William J. Bichler	Dem.	Belgium
10	Pierce		William A. Kay	Rep.	Martell
21	Portage		Orestes A. Crowell	Rep.	Almond
12	Price & Taylor		Elias L. Urquhart	Rep.	Medford
03	Racine	1	William H. Bell	Rep.	Racine
03	Racine	2	John H. Kamper	Rep.	Raymond
28	Richland		Chris Monson	Rep.	Akan
22	Rock	1	Lewis E. Gettle	Rep.	Edgerton
22	Rock	2	Grant U. Fisher	Rep.	Janesville
22	Rock	3	Simon Smith	Rep.	Beloit
27	Sauk	1	John R. Hofstatter	Dem.	Baraboo
27	Sauk	2	Albert O. Sorge	Dem.	Reedsburg
14	Shawano		Thomas J. Mahon	Rep.	Birnamwood
20	Sheboygan	1	Otto B. Joerns	Dem.	Sheboygan
20	Sheboygan	2	Otto A. La Budde	Dem.	Elkhart Lake
10	St. Croix		Andrew P. Kealy	Dem.	Hammond
32	Trempealeau		Peter Nelton	Dem.	Chimney Rock
28	Vernon		Lawrence Grimsrud	Rep.	Westby
23	Walworth		S. Clayton Goff	Rep.	Elkhorn
33	Washington		Henry V. Schwalbach	Dem.	Germantown
33	Waukesha	1	Laurel E. Youmans	Rep.	Mukwonago
33	Waukesha	2	Phil H. Jones	Rep.	Delafield
21	Waupaca	1	Andrew R. Potts	Rep.	Dayton
21	Waupaca	2	Otto L. Olen	Rep.	Clintonville
09	Waushara		Michael O'Connor	Rep.	Hancock
19	Winnebago	1	Robert L. Clark	Rep.	Oshkosh
19	Winnebago	2	Julius H. Dennhardt	Rep.	Neenah
19	Winnebago	3	Wilbur E. Hurlbut	Rep.	Oshkosh
09	Wood		William E. Wheelan	Dem.	Grand Rapids

== Committees ==
=== Senate committees ===
- Senate Standing Committee on Corporations – W. C. Owen, chair
- Senate Standing Committee on Education and Public Welfare – J. S. Donald, chair
- Senate Standing Committee on Finance – A. W. Sanborn, chair
- Senate Standing Committee on the Judiciary – J. J. Blaine, chair
- Senate Standing Committee on Legislative Procedure – H. C. Martin, chair
- Senate Standing Committee on State Affairs – H. Krumrey, chair
- Senate Special Committee on Banking – W. C. Owen, chair
- Senate Special Committee on Education – J. S. Donald, chair
- Senate Special Committee on Good Roads – J. S. Donald, chair
- Senate Special Committee on Income Tax – J. C. Kleczka, chair
- Senate Special Committee on Industrial Insurance – A. W. Sanborn, chair
- Senate Special Committee on Memorial Park at Camp Randall – D. G. James, chair
- Senate Special Committee on Water Power, Forestry, and Drainage – P. O. Husting, chair

=== Assembly committees ===
- Assembly Standing Committee on Agriculture – A. Johnson, chair
- Assembly Standing Committee on Agricultural Exhibitions – M. O'Connor, chair
- Assembly Standing Committee on Banks – O. A. Crowell, chair
- Assembly Standing Committee on the Capitol – C. J. Johnson, chair
- Assembly Standing Committee on Charitable and Penal Institutions – C. B. Ballard, chair
- Assembly Standing Committee on Cities – E. C. Stern, chair
- Assembly Standing Committee on City Living Conditions – C. A. Harper, chair
- Assembly Standing Committee on Commerce and Manufactures – D. B. Stevens, chair
- Assembly Standing Committee on Conservation – J. H. Kamper, chair
- Assembly Standing Committee on Constitutional Amendment – L. E. Gettle, chair
- Assembly Standing Committee on County Living Conditions – T. J. Mahon, chair
- Assembly Standing Committee on Counties – W. Reader, chair
- Assembly Standing Committee on Courts and Procedure – H. J. Mortensen, chair
- Assembly Standing Committee on Education – C. F. Viebahn, chair
- Assembly Standing Committee on Elections – T. A. Roycraft, chair
- Assembly Standing Committee on Engrossed Bills – R. Reed, chair
- Assembly Standing Committee on Enrolled Bills – W. E. Hurlbut, chair
- Assembly Standing Committee on Excise and Fees – M. Hull, chair
- Assembly Standing Committee on Express, Telegraph, and Telephone – O. Onstad, chair
- Assembly Standing Committee on Fish and Game – E. L. Urquhart, chair
- Assembly Standing Committee on Highways – J. R. Jones, chair
- Assembly Standing Committee on Insurance – L. L. Johnson, chair
- Assembly Standing Committee on the Judiciary – E. McConnell, chair
- Assembly Standing Committee on Labor and Labor Conditions – W. H. Bell, chair
- Assembly Standing Committee on Legislative Procedure – C. A. Ingram, chair
- Assembly Standing Committee on Libraries – J. C. Gilbertson, chair
- Assembly Standing Committee on Military Affairs – S. Smith, chair
- Assembly Standing Committee on National and Interstate Relations – O. L. Olen, chair
- Assembly Standing Committee on Parks, Play Grounds, and City Planning – G. W. Bingham, chair
- Assembly Standing Committee on Printing – D. Schreiner, chair
- Assembly Standing Committee on Public Health and Sanitation – L. E. Youmans, chair
- Assembly Standing Committee on Purity of Commodities – G. U. Fisher, chair
- Assembly Standing Committee on State and Economic Betterment – W. A. Kay, chair
- Assembly Standing Committee on Taxation – E. E. Haight, chair
- Assembly Standing Committee on Third Reading – T. Frye, chair
- Assembly Standing Committee on Towns and Villages – P. H. Jones, chair
- Assembly Standing Committee on Transportation – A. V. Wells, chair
- Assembly Standing Committee on Vocational Education – C. H. Dorner, chair
- Assembly Standing Committee on Welfare of Women and Children – S. C. Goff, chair
- Assembly Standing Committee on Workmen's Compensation – R. L. Clark, chair

=== Joint committees ===
- Joint Committee on Finance – R. J. Nye (Asm.)
- Joint Committee on Revision – O. H. Berg (Asm.)

== Employees ==
=== Senate employees ===
- Chief Clerk: Fred M. Wylie
  - Journal Clerk: J. L. Schnitzler
    - Assistant Journal Clerk: John Meili
  - Bookkeeper: John M. Bessey
    - Assistant Bookkeeper: H. E. Blackman
  - Engrossing Clerk: A. C. Tretow
    - Assistant Engrossing Clerks:
      - G. D. Theleen
      - R. E. Gordon
  - Enrolling Clerk: Elmer Trickey
    - Assistant Enrolling Clerks:
      - C. E. Mullen
      - J. E. Schunck
  - Index Clerk: C. W. Rhodes
  - Clerk of the Committee on Corporations: A. J. Nelson
  - Clerk of the Committee on Education and Public Welfare: R. H. Hillyer
  - Clerk of the Committee on Finance: Albert W. Orr
  - Clerk of the Committee on the Judiciary: F. W. Spencer
  - Clerk of the Committee on State Affairs: March Polk
- Sergeant-at-Arms: Charles A. Leicht
  - Assistant Sergeant-at-Arms: William A. Powell
  - Document Clerk: Elmer A. Pierce
  - Day Police: E. P. Mahoney
  - Night Police: William Mackmiller
  - Laborer: A. R. Oates
- Postmaster: D. E. Williams

=== Assembly employees ===
- Chief Clerk: C. E. Shaffer
  - Journal Clerk: W. W. Jones
    - Assistant Journal Clerk: Charles E. Tuffley
  - Bookkeeper: W. J. Goldschmidt
    - Assistant Bookkeeper: J. C. Hawker
  - General Clerks:
    - L. M. Shearer
    - E. V. Nevins
  - Index Clerk: A. H. Heidner
  - Proofreaders and Enrolling Clerks:
    - R. E. Van Matre
    - Jos. H. Blied
  - Engrossing Clerk: L. B. Webster
- Sergeant-at-Arms: William S. Irvine
  - Assistant Sergeant-at-Arms: Olaf Goldstrand
  - Document Room Custodian: J. W. Bathgate
    - Assistant Document Room Custodian: J. J. Ruble
  - Police:
    - E. F. Wright
    - L. Longbotham
    - O. O. Owen
  - Cloak Room Attendant: Martin Olson
  - Laborer: A. Mieskothe
  - Night Watch: E. C. Cady
- Postmaster: W. A. Mayhew
  - Post Office Messenger: J. Hembre
