= 1911 United States Senate election in Wisconsin =

- January 25, 1911
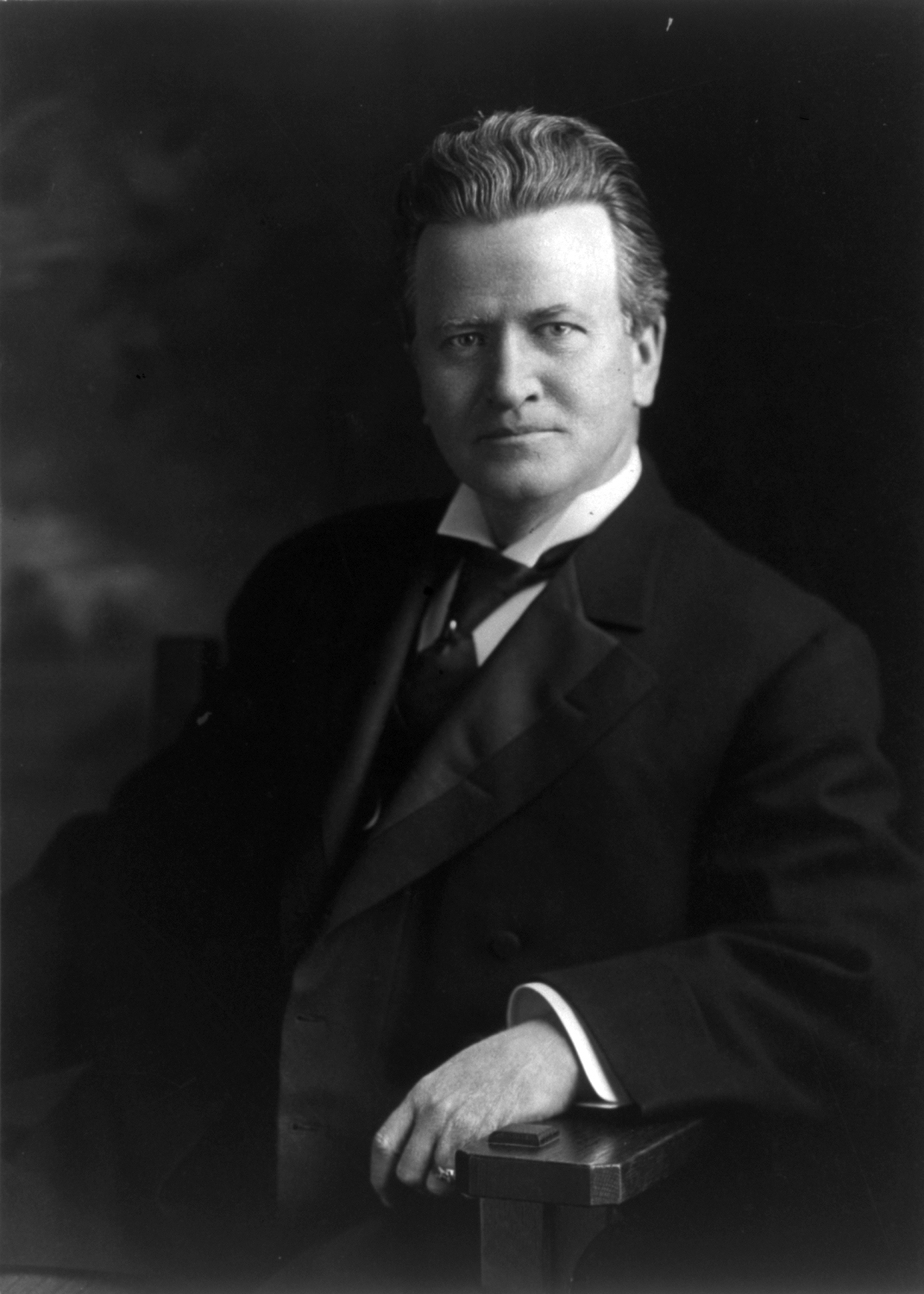

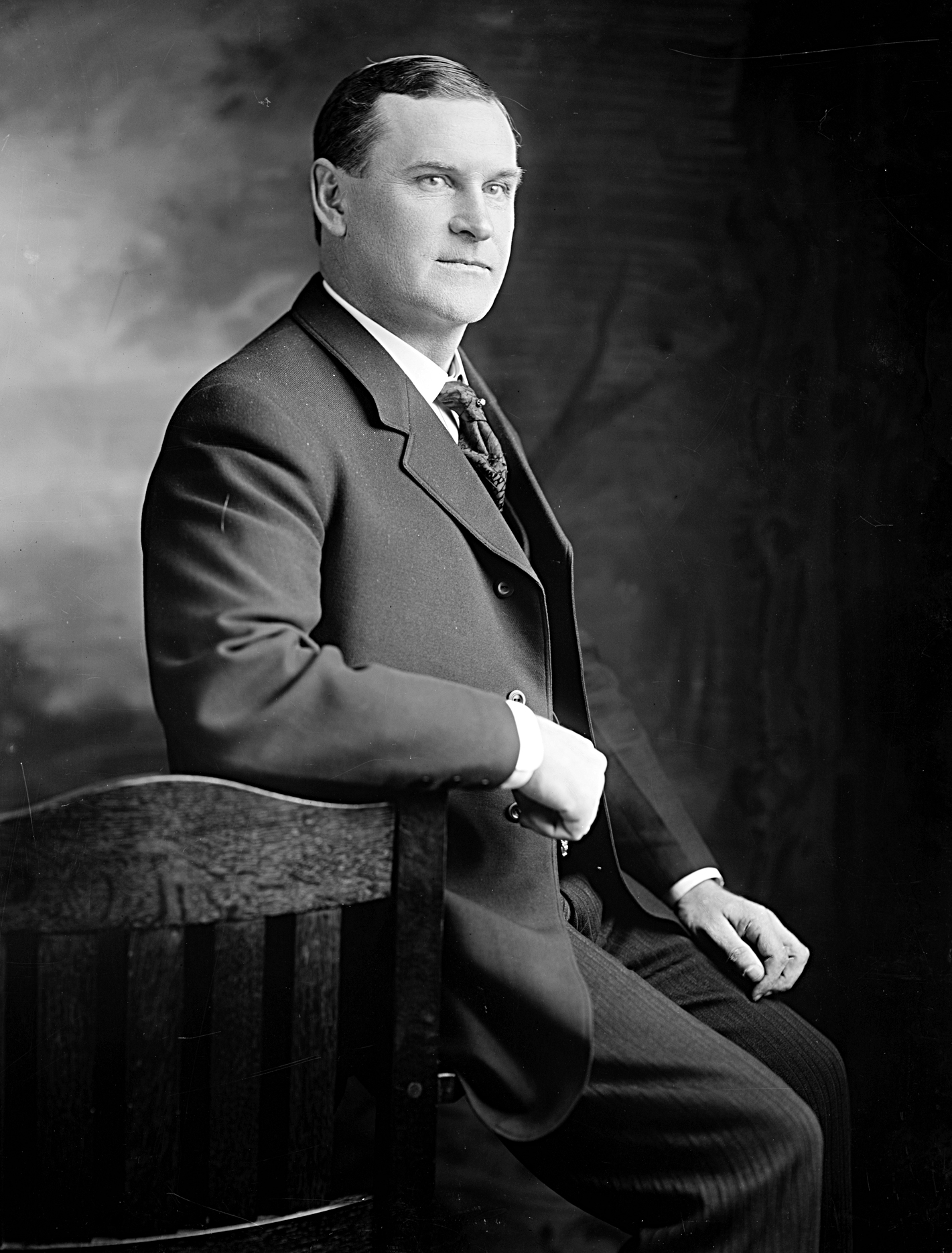

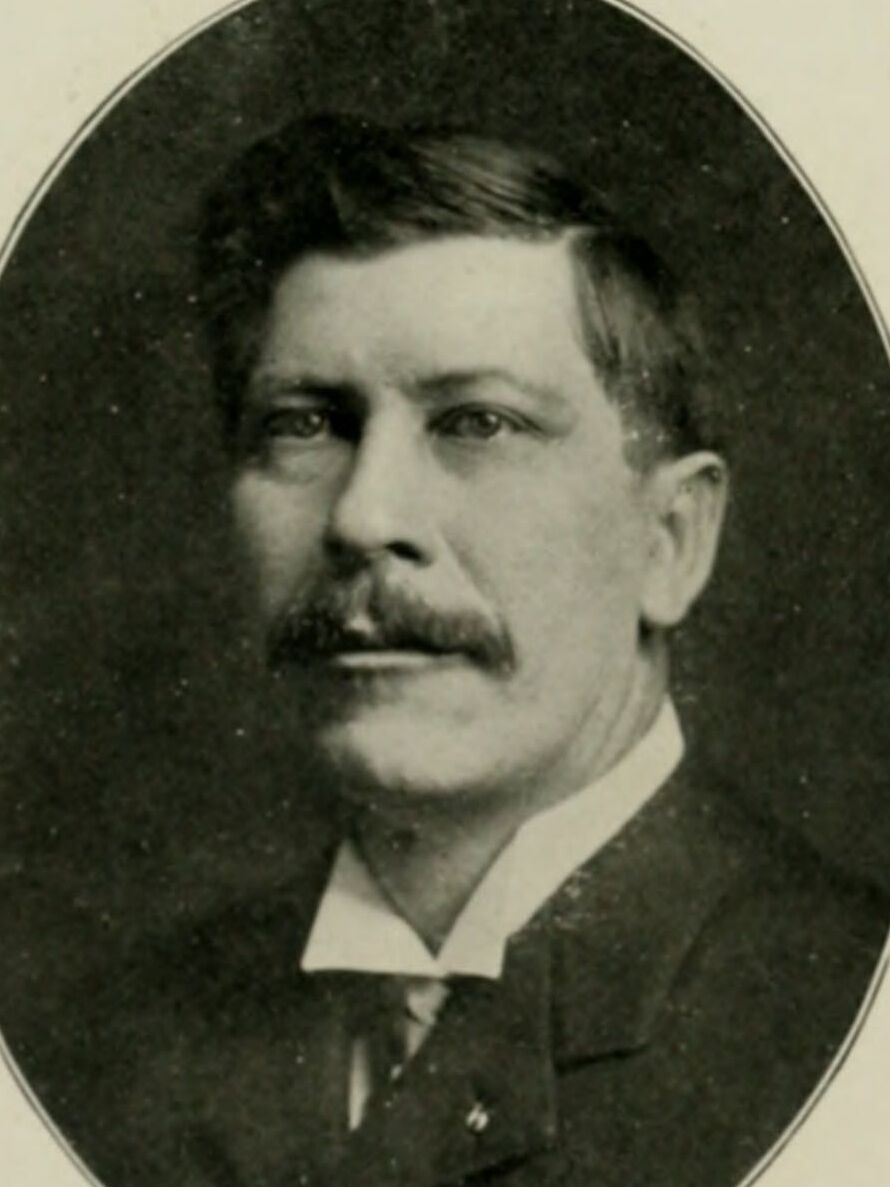
Nominee	Robert M. La Follette	Charles H. Weisse	John C. Kleist
Party	Republican	Democratic	Social-Democratic
Legislative vote	83	31	14
Percentage	64.34%	24.03%	10.85%
U.S. senator before election
Robert M. La Follette
Republican
Elected U.S. Senator
Robert M. La Follette
Republican

The 1911 United States Senate election in Wisconsin was held in the 50th Wisconsin Legislature on January 25, 1911. Incumbent Republican U.S. senator Robert M. La Follette was re-elected on the first ballot.

In the 1911 term, Republicans held overwhelming majorities in both chambers of the Wisconsin Legislature, so had more than enough votes to elect a Republican United States senator. This was the second U.S. Senate election in Wisconsin carried out after the implementation of partisan primary elections. La Follette won the Republican primary by a wide margin over challenger Samuel A. Cook. U.S. representative Charles H. Weisse won the nomination for Democrats, although the Democratic state convention had voted to support Burt Williams of Ashland.

== Democratic primary ==
=== On the ballot ===
- Charles H. Weisse, incumbent U.S. representative from Sheboygan Falls, Wisconsin.
- Burt Williams, former mayor of Ashland, Wisconsin, self-professes progressive Democrat and Democratic state convention nominee.

=== Primary result ===
Democratic Primary, September 6, 1910
Party	Candidate	Votes	%
Democratic	Charles H. Weisse	30,579	65.52%
Democratic	Burt Williams	16,089	34.48%
Plurality		14,490	31.05%
Total votes		46,668	100.0%

== Republican primary ==
=== On the ballot ===
- Samuel A. Cook, former U.S. representative and prominent state leader in the Grand Army of the Republic from Neenah, Wisconsin, unsuccessful candidate in the 1909 primary.
- Robert M. La Follette, incumbent U.S. senator and former governor.

=== Primary result ===
Republican Primary, September 6, 1910
Party	Candidate	Votes	%
Republican	Robert M. La Follette (incumbent)	142,978	77.80%
Republican	Samuel A. Cook	40,791	22.20%
Plurality		102,187	55.61%
Total votes		183,769	100.0%

== Social-Democratic primary ==
=== On the ballot ===
- John C. Kleist, lawyer from Milwaukee.

=== Primary result ===
Social-Democratic Primary, September 6, 1910
Party	Candidate	Votes	%
Social-Democratic	John C. Kleist	11,435	100.0%
Total votes		11,435	100.0%

== Prohibition primary ==
=== On the ballot ===
- John V. Collins

=== Primary result ===
Prohibition Primary, September 6, 1910
Party	Candidate	Votes	%
Prohibition	John V. Collins	1,832	100.0%
Total votes		1,832	100.0%

== Election ==
The two legislative chambers voted separately on January 24, 1911, then convened in joint session on January 25, reading their respective tallies and announcing La Follette as the winner.

1st Vote of the 50th Wisconsin Legislature, January 25, 1911
Party	Candidate	Votes	%
Republican	Robert M. La Follette (incumbent)	83 (Note: La Follette received the votes of all Republicans except senator John Meek Whitehead (who voted for Winkler), and senators Edward E. Browne and James A. Wright (who were absent).)	64.34%
Democratic	Charles H. Weisse	31 (Note: Weisse received the votes of all Democrats except representatives Mathias J. Scholey and William E. Wheelan (who were absent).)	24.03%
Social-Democratic	John C. Kleist	14 (Note: Kleist received the votes of all Social-Democrats.)	10.85%
Republican	Frederick C. Winkler	1 (Note: Republican senator John Meek Whitehead voted for Winkler.)	0.78%
Prohibition	John V. Collins	0	0.0%
	Absent or not voting	4	
Majority		65	50.39%
Total votes		129	96.99%
Republican hold			
