= 1909 United States Senate election in Wisconsin =

- January 27, 1909 – March 4, 1909
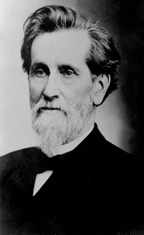

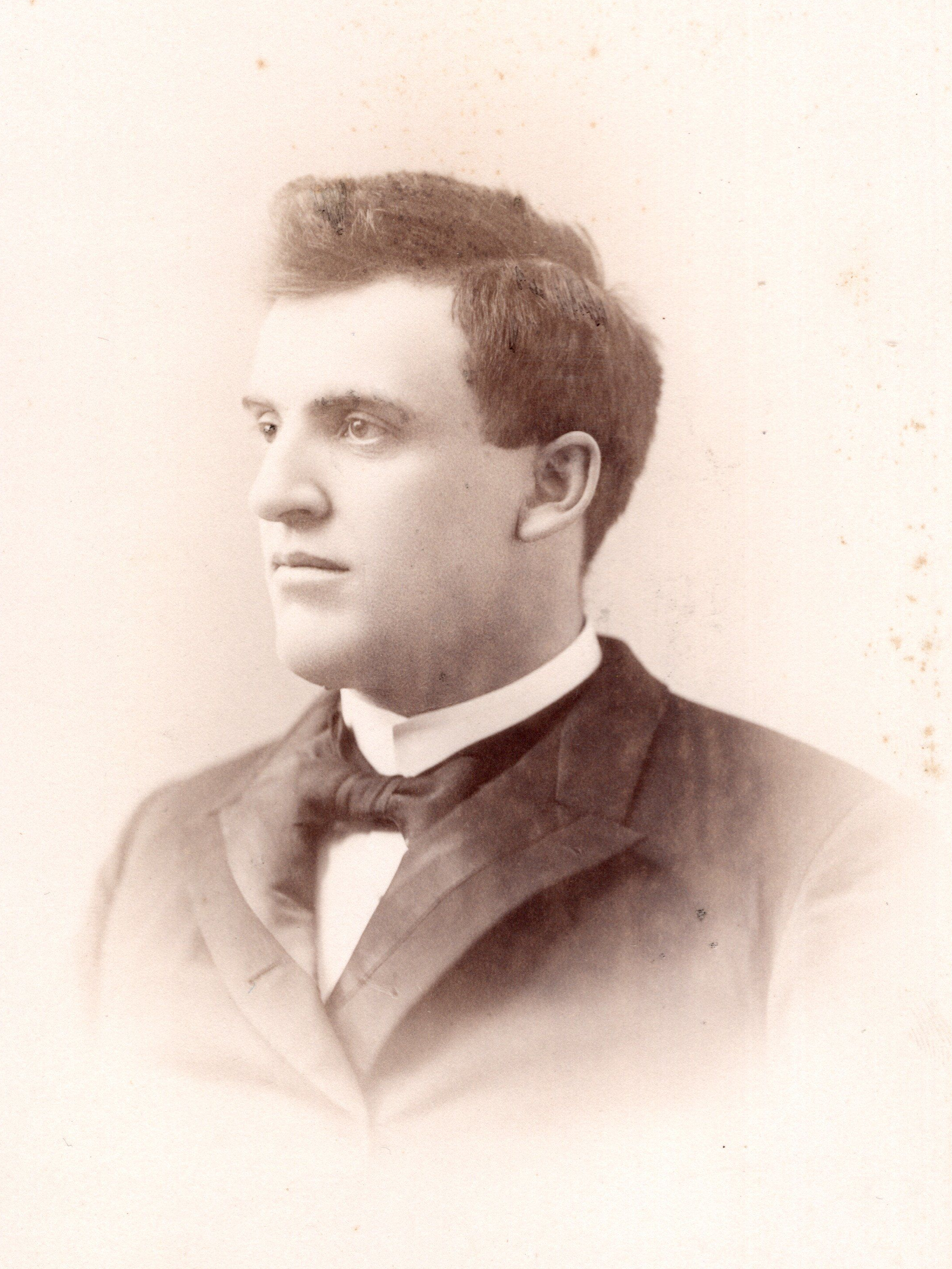
Nominee	Isaac Stephenson	Neal Brown	others
Party	Republican	Democratic
Legislative vote	63	7	53
Percentage	51.22%	5.69%	43.09%
U.S. senator before election
Isaac Stephenson
Republican
Elected U.S. Senator
Isaac Stephenson
Republican

The 1909 United States Senate election in Wisconsin was held in the 49th Wisconsin Legislature between January 27, 1909, and March 4, 1909. Incumbent Republican U.S. senator Isaac Stephenson was ultimately re-elected on the 23rd ballot after more than a month of voting and negotiation.

In the 1909 term, Republicans held overwhelming majorities in both chambers of the Wisconsin Legislature, so had more than enough votes to elect a Republican United States senator. However, this was the first U.S. Senate election in Wisconsin after the passage of the state law which established primary elections for determining party nominees. This led to considerable turmoil in the legislative joint session, as the winner of the Republican primary (Stephenson) lacked majority support in the Republican caucus and received only 31% of the primary vote. The issue was exacerbated by allegations that Stephenson had committed campaign finance violations during the primary.

Both chambers initially voted on January 26 in sufficient numbers to re-elect Stephenson, but at the joint session on January 27, the presiding officer, Lieutenant Governor John Strange, ignored a motion to read the results and pronounce Stephenson elected, and instead moved to a new vote for U.S. senator. Stephenson fell short in that vote, and the stalemate dragged out for more than a month as various factions attempted to coalesce around an alternative. March 4, 1909—the scheduled start of the next U.S. Senate term—was the effective deadline for the Legislature to act, as Stephenson already planned to assert his right to be seated as U.S. senator based on the initial January 26 votes. With the Legislature unable to reach a majority for any alternative candidate, Stephenson was ultimately re-elected by a bare majority on March 4, with more than 40 members casting protest votes for random colleagues and neighbors.

== Democratic primary ==
=== On the ballot ===
- Neal Brown, prominent lawyer and former state legislator from Wausau, Wisconsin.
- Melvin A. Hoyt, editor of the Milwaukee Daily News.

=== Primary result ===
Democratic Primary, September 1, 1908
Party	Candidate	Votes	%
Democratic	Neal Brown	24,944	66.71%
Democratic	Melvin A. Hoyt	12,228	32.70%
	Scattering	218	0.58%
Plurality		12,716	34.01%
Total votes		37,390	100.0%

== Republican primary ==
=== On the ballot ===
- Samuel A. Cook, former U.S. representative and prominent state leader in the Grand Army of the Republic from Neenah, Wisconsin.
- William H. Hatten, lumber millionaire and former state senator from Outagamie County, Wisconsin.
- Francis E. McGovern, incumbent district attorney of Milwaukee County.
- Isaac Stephenson, incumbent U.S. senator, former U.S. representative of Wisconsin's 9th congressional district, from Marinette, Wisconsin.

=== Primary result ===
Republican Primary, September 1, 1908
Party	Candidate	Votes	%
Republican	Isaac Stephenson (incumbent)	56,839	31.04%
Republican	Samuel A. Cook	47,944	26.19%
Republican	Francis E. McGovern	42,631	23.28%
Republican	William H. Hatten	35,621	19.46%
	Scattering	54	0.58%
Plurality		8,895	4.86%
Total votes		183,089	100.0%

=== Other candidates with significant caucus support ===
- Henry Allen Cooper, incumbent U.S. representative of Wisconsin's 1st congressional district, from Racine County.
- John J. Esch, incumbent U.S. representative of Wisconsin's 7th congressional district, from La Crosse, Wisconsin.

== Social-Democratic primary ==
=== On the ballot ===
- Jacob Rummel, former state senator from Milwaukee.

=== Primary result ===
Social-Democratic Primary, September 1, 1908
Party	Candidate	Votes	%
Social-Democratic	Jacob Rummel	4,047	99.19%
	Scattering	33	0.81%
Total votes		4,080	100.0%

== Prohibition primary ==
=== On the ballot ===
- Isaac Stephenson, incumbent U.S. senator, former U.S. representative of Wisconsin's 9th congressional district, from Marinette, Wisconsin.

=== Primary result ===
Prohibition Primary, September 1, 1908
Party	Candidate	Votes	%
Republican	Isaac Stephenson (incumbent)	79	24.01%
	Scattering	250	75.99%
Total votes		329	100.0%

== Election ==
=== Events of January 27, 1909 ===
Pursuant to federal law, each chamber of the legislature voted separately on their choice for U.S. senator on January 26, prior to meeting in joint session on January 27 to conduct the election. The law stipulated that if a candidate received a majority of those initial votes—as Stephenson did in this case—he "shall be declared duly elected senator." The record of those votes was not initially admitted in the joint session, but a motion by state senator George Hudnall read those results into the record and called for the president of the joint session to declare that Stephenson had been elected. The president of the joint session, Lieutenant Governor John Strange, ignored Hudnall's motion and instead proceeded to a new vote in the joint session. Stephenson failed to reach a majority in the formal vote of the joint session.

Initial Votes of the 49th Wisconsin Legislature, January 26, 1909
Party	Candidate	Votes	%
Republican	Isaac Stephenson (incumbent)	72	71.29%
Democratic	Neal Brown	20	19.80%
Social-Democratic	Jacob Rummel	4	3.96%
Republican	Samuel A. Cook	2	1.98%
Republican	Henry Allen Cooper	1	0.99%
Republican	John J. Esch	1	0.99%
Republican	James Huff Stout	1	0.99%
	Null vote	32	
	Absent	1	
Majority		51	50.50%
Total votes		101	75.94%
Void election result

1st Vote of the 49th Wisconsin Legislature, January 27, 1909
Party	Candidate	Votes	%	±%
Republican	Isaac Stephenson (incumbent)	65	49.62%	▼7
Democratic	Neal Brown	21	16.03%	▲1
Republican	Henry Allen Cooper	11	8.40%	▲10
Republican	John J. Esch	7	5.34%	▲6
Republican	Samuel A. Cook	4	3.05%	▲2
Social-Democratic	Jacob Rummel	4	3.05%	Steady
Republican	Walter C. Owen	3	2.29%	
Republican	James H. Davidson	2	1.53%	
Republican	William D. Hoard	2	1.53%	
Republican	James Huff Stout	2	1.53%	▲1
Republican	Levi H. Bancroft	1	0.76%	
Republican	M. J. Cleary	1	0.76%	
Republican	John S. Donald	1	0.76%	
Republican	E. A. Edmunds	1	0.76%	
Republican	Charles E. Estabrook	1	0.76%	
Republican	Irvine Lenroot	1	0.76%	
Republican	Henry Lockney	1	0.76%	
Republican	Francis E. McGovern	1	0.76%	
Republican	John Strange	1	0.76%	
Republican	Charles M. Webb	1	0.76%	
	Absent or not voting	2		
Majority		66	50.38%	
Total votes		131	98.50%	▲30
Void election result

=== Vote on March 4, 1909 ===
The legislature re-convened in joint session on March 4.

23rd Vote of the 49th Wisconsin Legislature, March 4, 1909
Party	Candidate	Votes	%
Republican	Isaac Stephenson (incumbent)	63	51.22%
Democratic	Neal Brown	7	5.69%
Republican	John J. Esch	7 (Note: On the final ballot, Esch received the votes of Republican senators John J. Blaine, Theodore W. Brazeau, and Spencer M. Marsh, and Republican representatives Charles M. Bradford, George E. Hoyt, H. J. Mortensen, and Simon F. Wehrwein.)	5.69%
Republican	Henry Allen Cooper	5 (Note: On the final ballot, Cooper received the votes of Republican senators Isaac T. Bishop and Harry C. Martin and Republican representatives Walker M. Curtiss, John H. Kamper, and Allen Wells.)	4.07%
Republican	Charles E. Estabrook	4	3.25%
Social-Democratic	Jacob Rummel	4 (Note: On the final ballot, Rummel received the votes of all the Social-Democrats.)	3.25%
Republican	John Strange	4	3.25%
Democratic	George W. Kindlin	3	2.44%
Democratic	M. W. Kalaher	2 (Note: On the final ballot, Democratic representatives George W. Kindlin and Henry V. Schwalbach voted for Kalaher.)	1.63%
Republican	Albert W. Sanborn	2 (Note: On the final ballot, Republican representatives D. C. Coolidge and John E. McConnell voted for Sanborn.)	1.63%
Republican	Levi H. Bancroft	1	0.81%
Republican	Sherburn M. Becker	1	0.81%
Democratic	William J. Bichler	1 (Note: On the final ballot, Democratic representative Paul O. Husting voted for Bichler.)	0.81%
Republican	M. J. Cleary	1	0.81%
Republican	Samuel A. Cook	1	0.81%
Republican	John S. Donald	1	0.81%
Republican	William D. Hoard	1	0.81%
Republican	Gustav R. Hoffman	1 (Note: On the final ballot, Republican representative Peter F. Leuch voted for Gustav R. Hoffman.)	0.81%
Democratic	Melvin A. Hoyt	1 (Note: On the final ballot, Democratic representative William J. Bichler voted for Melvin Hoyt.)	0.81%
Democratic	John F. Hughes	1 (Note: On the final ballot, Democratic representative Charles Lentz voted for Hughes.)	0.81%
Democratic	Paul O. Husting	1 (Note: On the final ballot, Democratic senator Charles L. Pearson voted for Husting.)	0.81%
Democratic	D. M. Kelly	1 (Note: On the final ballot, Democratic representative Virgil H. Cady voted for D. M. Kelly.)	0.81%
Republican	Edwin Kull	1 (Note: On the final ballot, Republican representative Clinton B. Ballard voted for Kull.)	0.81%
Republican	Irvine Lenroot	1 (Note: On the final ballot, Republican representative Axel Johnson voted for Lenroot.)	0.81%
Republican	Henry Lockney	1 (Note: On the final ballot, Republican senator Walter C. Owen voted for Lockney.)	0.81%
Republican	John E. McConnell	1 (Note: On the final ballot, Republican senator Thomas Morris voted for John McConnell.)	0.81%
Republican	Francis E. McGovern	1 (Note: On the final ballot, Republican representative Henry Edgar Roethe voted for McGovern.)	0.81%
Republican	Elmer A. Morse	1 (Note: On the final ballot, Republican representative Albert W. Sanborn voted for Morse.)	0.81%
Republican	Charles Neitzel	1 (Note: On the final ballot, Republican representative James R. Barnett voted for Neitzel.)	0.81%
Republican	Walter C. Owen	1 (Note: On the final ballot, Republican senator Henry Lockney voted for Walter Owen.)	0.81%
Republican	C. K. Reichert	1 (Note: On the final ballot, Republican representative Carl H. Dorner voted for C. K. Reichert.)	0.81%
Republican	Charles M. Webb	1 (Note: On the final ballot, Republican representative Emil Keup voted for Webb.)	0.81%
	Absent or not voting	10	
Majority		62	50.41%
Total votes		123	92.48%
Republican hold			
