= Salona (disambiguation) =

Salona was an ancient Roman city on the Adriatic Sea, in Dalmatia.

Salona may also refer to:

- Salona, Greece, a town in central Greece now known as Amfissa
  - Lordship of Salona, a medieval Crusader state in Greece
  - Latin Bishopric of Salona, a Catholic titular and former residential see
- Salona, Pennsylvania
- Salona, Wisconsin, a town in the United States
- Salona (McLean, Virginia), Light Horse Harry Lee homestead
