= Nelton =

Nelton is a given name and a surname. Notable people with the name include:

- Nelton Ndebele (born 1985), Zimbabwean sprinter
- Peter Nelton (1853–1936), American politician
