= E. A. Raymond =

American politician (1861–1918)

Member of the Wisconsin State Assembly from the Brown 1st district
- In office January 2, 1911 – January 6, 1913
- Preceded by: Ferdinand Wittig
- Succeeded by: Archie McComb

Personal details
- Born: April 11, 1861 Fond du Lac, Wisconsin, U.S.
- Died: June 20, 1918 (aged 57) Green Bay, Wisconsin, U.S.
- Resting place: Fort Howard Memorial Park, Green Bay, Wisconsin
- Party: Republican (Progressive faction)
- Spouse: married
- Children: none
- Occupation: Insurance & real estate business

Edwin A. Raymond (April 11, 1861 – June 20, 1918) was an American businessman and progressive Republican politician from Green Bay, Wisconsin. He represented Green Bay in the Wisconsin State Assembly during the 1911–1912 session.

== Biography ==
E. A. Raymond was born in the city of Fond du Lac, Wisconsin, in April 1861. He was educated in public schools, supplemented by private instruction. In Fond du Lac, he worked as a clerk in a book and stationery store for seven years. He then moved to Iron River, Michigan, where he worked as a bookkeeper for the Iron River Furnace Company, and was then employed as an engineer for the Chicago and Northwestern Railway Company for much of the 1880s and 1890s. He resigned from the railroad in 1898 and operated a wholesale produce business, then purchased a farm in 1901 in Fond du Lac County.

Finally, in 1906, he moved to Green Bay, Wisconsin, where he worked in the life insurance and real estate businesses.

In 1910, he ran for Wisconsin State Assembly, seeking the Republican Party nomination. During this era, the state's politics were largely dominated by the Republican Party, but the party was split between the progressive faction of Robert M. La Follette and the stalwart faction. Raymond was a supporter of La Follette, and went on to defeat his stalwart opponent W. E. Burdeau in the primary.

At the general election in November, he narrowly prevailed over Democratic and Social Democratic opponents. His district comprised all of Green Bay as well as the northwest quarter of Brown County. During the 50th Wisconsin Legislature, he served on the committees on cities, and on labor and labor conditions.

He did not run for re-election in 1912.

Raymond died on the morning of June 20, 1918, after suffering from disease for about a month.

== Electoral history ==
=== Wisconsin Assembly (1910) ===
Wisconsin Assembly, Brown 1st District Election, 1910
Party	Candidate	Votes	%	±%
Republican Primary, September 6, 1910
Republican	E. A. Raymond	1,291	51.72%	
Republican	W. E. Burdeau	1,205	48.28%	
Plurality		86	3.45%	
Total votes		2,496	100.0%	
General Election, November 8, 1910
Republican	E. A. Raymond	1,702	45.35%	−10.60%
Democratic	Alex D. McGruer	1,497	39.89%	+3.44%
Social Democratic	Charles H. Robinson	554	14.76%	+7.16%
Plurality		205	5.46%	-14.04%
Total votes		3,753	100.0%	-23.28%
Republican hold				

Wisconsin State Assembly
Preceded by Ferdinand Wittig	Member of the Wisconsin State Assembly from the Brown 1st district January 2, 1911 – January 6, 1913	Succeeded by Archie McComb
