= Vignes =

Vignes may refer to one of these places:

France

- Vignes, Pyrénées-Atlantiques, a commune in the French region of Aquitaine
- Vignes, Yonne, a commune in the French region of Bourgogne
- Vignes-la-Côte, a commune in the French region of Champagne-Ardenne

United States

- Vignes, Wisconsin, an unincorporated community in Door County

or to these people:

- Alberto Juan Vignes, Argentine Minister of Foreign Affairs, 1973–1975
- Hans des Vignes (born 1985) Trinidadian radio broadcaster
- Jean-Louis Vignes (1780–1862), French-born Alta California vintner
- Michelle Vignes (c. 1926–2012) French-born American photographer
- Sashina Vignes Waran (born 1988) French badminton player
- Vignes Mourthi (1980–2003) Malaysian drug trafficker
