= Charles H. Weisse =

American politician (1866–1919)

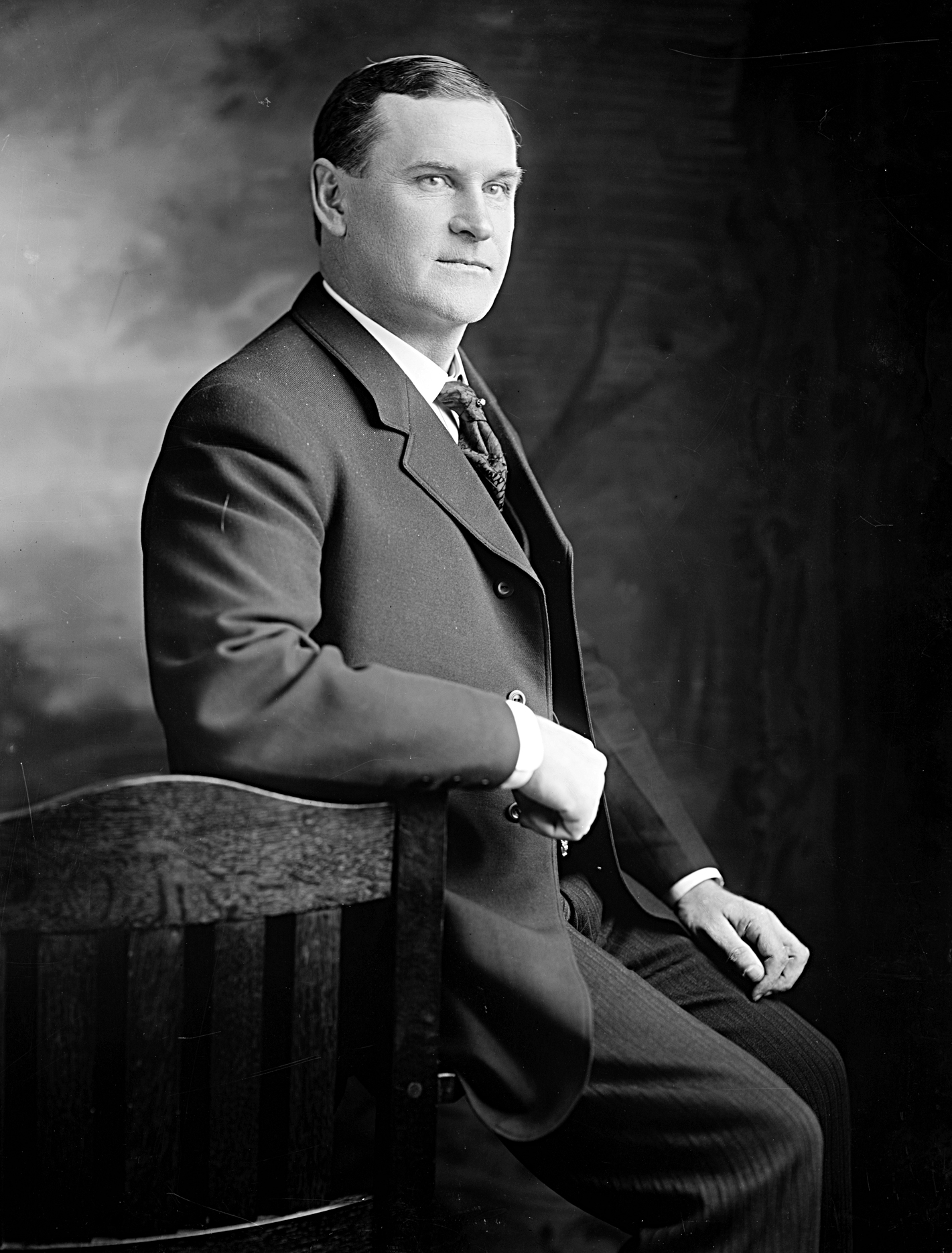

Member of the U.S. House of Representatives from Wisconsin's 6th district
- In office March 4, 1903 – March 3, 1911
- Preceded by: James H. Davidson
- Succeeded by: Michael E. Burke

Village President of Sheboygan Falls, Wisconsin
- In office April 1893 – April 1896

Personal details
- Born: October 24, 1866 Sheboygan Falls, Wisconsin, U.S.
- Died: October 8, 1919 (aged 52) Sheboygan Falls, Wisconsin, U.S.
- Resting place: Sheboygan Falls Cemetery
- Party: Democratic
- Spouses: Jennie Koster (died 1891); Caroline H. Kallenberg (m. 1896–1919)
- Children: Minie J. Weisse; (b. 1890; died 1891); Henry Charles Weisse Sr. (b 1897; died 1979)
- Occupation: Tanner, furrier, politician, publisher

Charles Herman Weisse (October 24, 1866 – October 8, 1919) was a German-American tanner, businessman, and Democratic politician from Sheboygan Falls, Wisconsin. He was a member of the United States House of Representatives for four terms, representing Wisconsin's 6th congressional district from 1903 to 1911. He also served three terms as president of the village of Sheboygan Falls.

== Early life ==
Born near Sheboygan Falls, Wisconsin, Weisse attended the public schools and St. Paul Lutheran School. At age 14, he went to work at his father's tannery business, and at age 22, he became a partner in the business, known as Chas. S. Weisse & Co., tanners and furriers. His brothers were also partners in the company; Charles, as the eldest living brother, became president of the company after their father's death. During his life, the Weisse tannery was a major employer in Sheboygan Falls.

He served as village president of Sheboygan Falls, Wisconsin, from 1893 to 1896 and was treasurer of the school board from 1897 to 1900.

== Political career ==
In 1900, he made his first run for United States House of Representatives, challenging incumbent Republican Samuel S. Barney in what was then the 5th congressional district. Weisse ran on the Democratic Party ticket and received 41% of the vote in the general election, falling about 5,000 votes short of Barney. The next year, however, redistricting moved Weisse's home county, Sheboygan, into the 6th congressional district, along with Ozaukee, Washington, Fond du Lac, and Dodge counties.

Weisse ran again in the new district in 1902. He faced a contest for the Democratic nomination at the 6th congressional district convention. His chief opponents were former congressman Owen A. Wells of Fond du Lac County, James E. Malone of Dodge County, and Henry Blank of Washington County. The convention deadlocked for three days, but on the 26th ballot, the chairman of the Dodge County delegation, Michael E. Burke, urged the delegates to come to a compromise; to demonstrate his sincerity, he and the Dodge County delegates cast their votes for Weisse. After Burke spoke, the remaining convention delegates also cast their votes for Weisse, and he was nominated unanimously. In the general election, Weisse was a vocal critic of the Dingley Act tariffs, and pledged to seek adjustments. He prevailed in the general election with 52% of the vote over the incumbent secretary of state William Froehlich. Weisse carried every county in the district and became the only Democratic member of Wisconsin's congressional delegation to the 58th United States Congress.

Weisse went on to win re-election three times, serving from March 4, 1903, to March 3, 1911. In 1910, Weisse announced he would decline renomination to Congress and instead sought the Democratic nomination for United States Senate. U.S. senators were still elected by the state legislature in 1910, so although Weisse received the Democratic nomination, Robert M. La Follette was easily re-elected by the overwhelmingly Republican 50th Wisconsin Legislature.

During his time in Congress, Weisse also served as delegate from Wisconsin to the Democratic National Conventions in 1904 and 1908. During the 1908 Democratic National Convention, Weisse took a leading role in crafting the party platform. The Chicago Tribune described his efforts as "neither a radical nor a conservative, but endeavor[ing] to produce a platform upon which the whole Democratic party could go before the people."

== Later years ==
After leaving office, Weisse devoted most of his time to his business and civic interests. In his last year in office, he also became a partner in the ownership of The Sheboygan Press, the main newspaper in the Sheboygan area. His investment enabled the paper to purchase new machinery and facilities to modernize the newspaper's production process.

On September 30, 1919, a catastrophic fire destroyed the entire Chas. S. Weisse & Co. factory in Sheboygan Falls, destroying an estimated $150,000 worth of property and inventory (about $5 million adjusted for inflation to 2024). After the fire, only one wall of the factory was left standing. Weisse made an inspection of the ruined building on October 8, 1919, with several of his employees, moving hides that were salvageable. During their work, a strong gust of wind caused the remaining brick wall to collapse on the team.

Weisse suffered head wounds. His brother Otto and son Henry Charles Weisse were a few feet away when Otto noticed the wind was blowing and some bricks were starting to fall. He then yelled out to warn everyone get away from the wall. As everyone backed away from the wall, the majority of the bricks fell on Charles. Onlookers picked him up and carried him into the office, where he had been reading the newspaper earlier. He was unconscious. His son ran across the street to their house and got his mother. They ran back to the office and he died shortly thereafter. Two other men died; one fell in a vat and drowned that day and the other died a week later in the hospital. Six more were injured.

His body lay in the family's house, as his father's had 22 years earlier. This time over 550 cars lined the road to the gravesite which was only a mile and a half away. Over 4,500 people attended his service which was overseen by the Knights Templar and the Freemasons. Congressmen, senators, along with the townspeople and businessmen from around the country were all there to attend. Flowers from across the country were also sent by friends and businesses he worked with. President Woodrow Wilson would have been there too but he was sick at the time. He was interred at Sheboygan Falls Cemetery.

== Personal life and family ==
Charles H. Weisse was the second of six children born to Charles Samuel Weisse and his wife Wilhelmine "Minne" (née Kalenberg). Both parents were German immigrants from the Thuringia region.

Charles's elder brother, Henry, died just before his 18th birthday in 1877, leaving Charles as the eldest surviving child. His younger brothers, Louis, Otto, and Emil, were partners with him in the tannery business. He also had a sister Mrs. Richard Wagner (Ida Weisse).

Weisse married twice. He first married Jennie Koster in 1889. They had one daughter, Ida, but Jennie and the child both died in 1891. Weisse subsequently married Caroline H. "Lena" Kallenberg. they had one son Henry Charles Weisse.

== Electoral history ==
=== U.S. House, Wisconsin's 5th district (1900) ===
Year	Election	Date	Elected				Defeated				Total	Plurality
1900	General	Nov. 6	Samuel S. Barney (inc)	Republican	23,089	52.42%	Charles H. Weisse	Dem.	18,066	41.01%	44,049	5,023
1900	General	Nov. 6	Samuel S. Barney (inc)	Republican	23,089	52.42%	Henry C. Berger	Soc.	2,284	5.19%	44,049	5,023
1900	General	Nov. 6	Samuel S. Barney (inc)	Republican	23,089	52.42%	Winfield D. Cox	Proh.	610	1.38%	44,049	5,023

=== U.S. House, Wisconsin's 6th district (1902, 1904, 1906, 1908) ===
Year	Election	Date	Elected				Defeated				Total	Plurality
1902	General	Nov. 4	Charles H. Weisse	Democratic	17,991	52.16%	William Froehlich	Rep.	14,575	42.26%	34,492	3,416
1902	General	Nov. 4	Charles H. Weisse	Democratic	17,991	52.16%	John P. Wilson	Soc.	1,394	4.04%	34,492	3,416
1902	General	Nov. 4	Charles H. Weisse	Democratic	17,991	52.16%	George C. Hill	Proh.	532	1.54%	34,492	3,416
1904	General	Nov. 8	Charles H. Weisse (inc)	Democratic	20,665	53.37%	Roy L. Morse	Rep.	17,687	45.68%	38,721	2,978
1904	General	Nov. 8	Charles H. Weisse (inc)	Democratic	20,665	53.37%	William J. Perry	Proh.	368	0.95%	38,721	2,978
1906	General	Nov. 6	Charles H. Weisse (inc)	Democratic	19,446	63.30%	Alvin Dreger	Rep.	10,512	34.22%	30,722	8,934
1906	General	Nov. 6	Charles H. Weisse (inc)	Democratic	19,446	63.30%	George C. Damrow	Soc.	764	2.49%	30,722	8,934
1908	General	Nov. 3	Charles H. Weisse (inc)	Democratic	23,317	57.76%	George W. Spratt	Rep.	16,184	40.09%	40,368	7,133
1908	General	Nov. 3	Charles H. Weisse (inc)	Democratic	23,317	57.76%	George C. Damrow	Soc.	866	2.15%	40,368	7,133

=== U.S. Senate (1911) ===
United States Senate Election in Wisconsin, 1911
Party	Candidate	Votes	%
Vote of the 50th Wisconsin Legislature, January 24, 1911
Republican	Robert M. La Follette (incumbent)	83	62.41%
Democratic	Charles H. Weisse	31	23.31%
Social Democratic	Henry Kleist	14	10.53%
Republican	Frederick C. Winkler	1	0.75%
	Absent or not voting	4	3.01%
Plurality		52	39.10%
Total votes		133	100.0%

U.S. House of Representatives
Preceded by James H. Davidson	Member of the U.S. House of Representatives from Wisconsin's 6th congressional district March 4, 1903 – March 3, 1911	Succeeded by Michael Edmund Burke
