= William Koepsel =

American politician (1858–1940)

William Friedrich August Koepsel (June 27, 1858 – 1940) was a member of the South Dakota Senate.

== Biography ==
Koepsel was born on a farm in Herman Center, Wisconsin on June 27, 1858 to Carolina Wilhelmine Detlaff and Johan Herman Koepsell. He moved to Groton, South Dakota in 1882 to start his own farm. He married Bertha W.A. Wangerin from his hometown in 1883, but she died two years later, leaving one son. He then married Adeline E Wegner in 1888, with whom he had three daughters. After Adeline's death in 1900, he married Meta Zahl in 1902. His third wife died four years later as well. Koepsel himself died at the age of 81 in 1940 in Los Angeles, California and he is interred in Inglewood, California.

== Career ==
Koepsel was a member of the Senate from 1903 to 1906. He was a Republican.
