= Russell Paulson =

American farmer and politician

Russell Paulson (August 23, 1897 – April 2, 1980) was an American farmer and politician.

Born in the Town of Chimney Rock, Wisconsin, Trempealeau County, Wisconsin. Paulson served in the United States Army during World War I, He was a farmer in Chimney Rock and served as school clerk, town chairman, and chairman of the Trempealeau County Board of Supervisors. From 1951 to 1955, Paulson served in the Wisconsin State Assembly and was a Republican.
