= Jacob Scharpf =

American politician (1874–?)

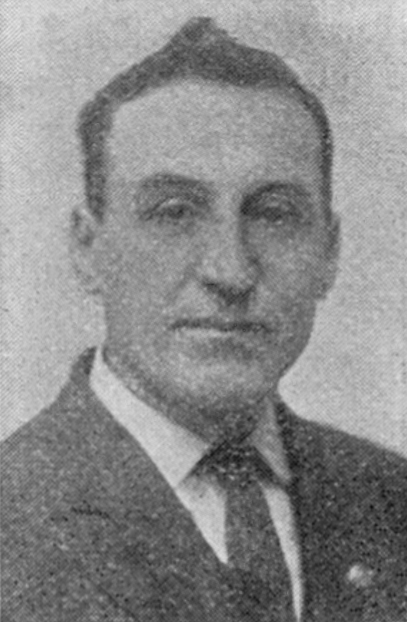

Member of the Wisconsin State Assembly
- In office 1917–1919

Personal details
- Born: September 4, 1874 Herman, Wisconsin, US
- Died: May 5, 1960 (aged 85) Hartford, Wisconsin, US
- Party: Republican
- Occupation: Dairy farmer

Jacob Scharpf (September 4, 1874 – May 5, 1960) is an American politician who was a member of the Wisconsin State Assembly.

== Biography ==
Scharpf was born on September 4, 1874, in Herman, Dodge County, Wisconsin. He attended high school in Juneau, Wisconsin.

He died at his home in Hartford, Wisconsin on May 5, 1960.

== Assembly career ==
A Republican, Scharpf was a member of the Assembly from 1917 to 1919.
