= Michael O'Connor (Wisconsin politician) =

American politician

Michael O'Connor (1856–1925) was a member of the Wisconsin State Assembly.

== Biography ==
O'Connor was born to Mary Fitzgibbon and William O'Connor on July 21, 1856 in Hancock (town), Wisconsin. There, he would become a farmer. He died February 3, 1925, and is interred in his hometown.

== Political career ==
O'Connor was a member of the Assembly during the 1911 and 1913 sessions. Other positions he held include Chairman (similar to Mayor) of Hancock. He was a Republican.
