= Clay Banks, Wisconsin =

- Town
- Part of eastern and central Clay Banks

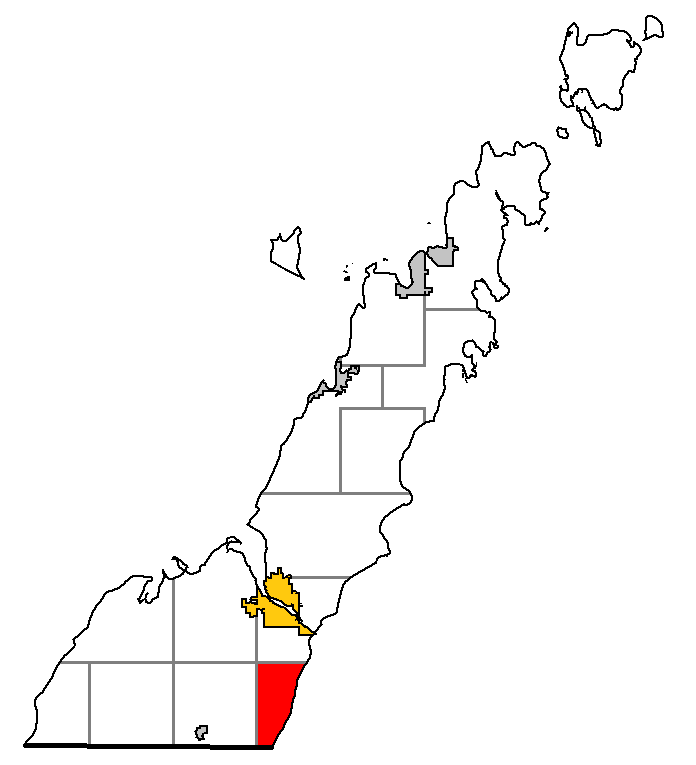
- Location of Clay Banks, within Door County
- Coordinates: 44°43′18″N 87°21′49″W
- Country: United States
- State: Wisconsin
- County: Door

Area
  - Total: 47.1 sq mi (122.0 km^{2})
  - Land: 14.9 sq mi (38.6 km^{2})
  - Water: 32.2 sq mi (83.4 km^{2})
- Elevation: 577 ft (176 m)

Population (2020)
  - Total: 385
  - Density: 25.8/sq mi (9.97/km^{2})
- Time zone: UTC-6 (Central (CST))
  - Summer (DST): UTC-5 (CDT)
- Area code: 920
- FIPS code: 55-15025
- GNIS feature ID: 1582965
- Website: https://tn.claybanks.wi.gov/

Clay Banks is a town in Door County, Wisconsin, United States. The population was 385 at the 2020 census. The unincorporated communities of Salona and Vignes are located in the town.

== Geography ==
According to the United States Census Bureau, the town has a total area of 47.1 square miles (122.0 km^{2}), of which 14.9 square miles (38.6 km^{2}) is land and 32.2 square miles (83.4 km^{2}) (68.38%) is water.

== Demographics ==
As of the census of 2000, there were 410 people, 162 households, and 121 families residing in the town. The population density was 27.5 people per square mile (10.6/km^{2}). There were 240 housing units at an average density of 16.1 per square mile (6.2/km^{2}). The racial makeup of the town was 97.80% White, 1.22% Native American, 0.24% Asian, and 0.73% from two or more races.

There were 162 households, out of which 30.9% had children under the age of 18 living with them, 67.9% were married couples living together, 3.1% had a female householder with no husband present, and 25.3% were non-families. 19.1% of all households were made up of individuals, and 11.1% had someone living alone who was 65 years of age or older. The average household size was 2.53 and the average family size was 2.91.

In the town, the population was spread out, with 24.9% under the age of 18, 3.2% from 18 to 24, 25.1% from 25 to 44, 26.6% from 45 to 64, and 20.2% who were 65 years of age or older. The median age was 42 years. For every 100 females, there were 106.0 males. For every 100 females age 18 and over, there were 97.4 males.

The median income for a household in the town was $42,708, and the median income for a family was $46,458. Males had a median income of $31,250 versus $21,964 for females. The per capita income for the town was $19,027. About 9.0% of families and 8.2% of the population were below the poverty line, including 13.0% of those under age 18 and 5.3% of those age 65 or over.

== Climate ==
Robert de La Salle Park

Climate chart (precipitation, max. and min. temperature)
J	F	M	A	M	J	J	A	S	O	N	D
57 −5 −6	54 −4 −13	60 1 −2	129 6 0	93 9 2	85 13 9	97 17 12	78 18 13	87 15 12	129 12 7	85 4 3	65 4 −1
- █ Average max. and min. temperatures in °C
- █ Precipitation totals in mm
Imperial conversion
J	F	M	A	M	J	J	A	S	O	N	D
2.2 23 21	2.1 25 9	2.4 34 28	5.1 43 32	3.7 48 36	3.3 55 48	3.8 63 54	3.1 64 55	3.4 59 54	5.1 54 45	3.3 39 37	2.6 39 30
- █ Average max. and min. temperatures in °F
- █ Precipitation totals in inches

== Notable people ==
- Lewis L. Johnson, Wisconsin State Assemblyman was Chairman of Clay Banks
- Conrad P. Olson, Oregon Supreme Court justice was born in Clay Banks
