= Herman, Dodge County, Wisconsin =

Herman, Wisconsin
- Town
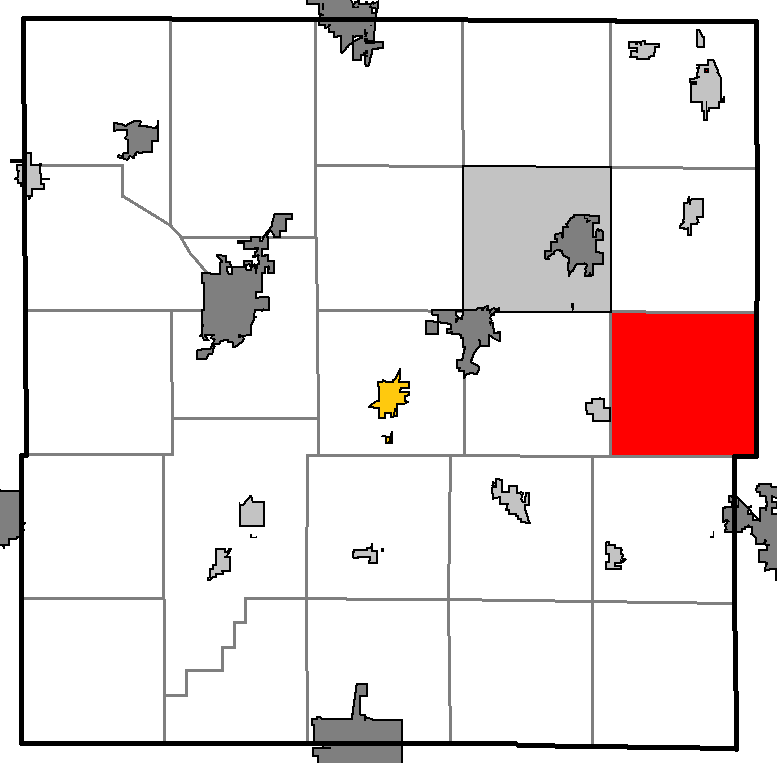
- Location of Herman, within Dodge County
- Coordinates: 43°25′16″N 88°28′12″W
- Country: United States
- State: Wisconsin
- County: Dodge

Area
  - Total: 36.4 sq mi (94.3 km^{2})
  - Land: 36.4 sq mi (94.3 km^{2})
  - Water: 0 sq mi (0.0 km^{2})
- Elevation: 1,142 ft (348 m)

Population (2020)
  - Total: 1,135
  - Density: 31.2/sq mi (12.0/km^{2})
- Time zone: UTC-6 (Central (CST))
  - Summer (DST): UTC-5 (CDT)
- FIPS code: 55-34000
- GNIS feature ID: 1583379
- Website: https://townofherman-wi.gov/

Herman is a town in Dodge County, Wisconsin, United States. The population was 1,135 at the 2020 census. The unincorporated communities of Herman Center and Huilsburg are located in the town. The unincorporated communities of Hochheim and Woodland are also located partially in the town.

== Geography ==
According to the United States Census Bureau, the town has a total area of 36.4 square miles (94.3 km^{2}), all land.

== Demographics ==
As of the census of 2000, there were 1,207 people, 394 households, and 327 families living in the town. The population density was 33.2 people per square mile (12.8/km^{2}). There were 401 housing units at an average density of 11.0 per square mile (4.3/km^{2}). The racial makeup of the town was 99.59% White, 0.08% Asian, 0.25% from other races, and 0.08% from two or more races. Hispanic or Latino of any race were 0.25% of the population.

There were 394 households, out of which 42.1% had children under the age of 18 living with them, 73.6% were married couples living together, 4.6% had a female householder with no husband present, and 16.8% were non-families. 12.4% of all households were made up of individuals, and 5.8% had someone living alone who was 65 years of age or older. The average household size was 3.06 and the average family size was 3.35.

In the town, the population was spread out, with 29.7% under the age of 18, 8.3% from 18 to 24, 28.7% from 25 to 44, 22.2% from 45 to 64, and 11.1% who were 65 years of age or older. The median age was 36 years. For every 100 females, there were 113.6 males. For every 100 females aged 18 and over, there were 115.2 males.

The median income for a household in the town was $49,938, and the median income for a family was $53,523. Males had a median income of $32,072 versus $23,000 for females. The per capita income for the town was $18,401. About 2.7% of families and 4.6% of the population were below the poverty line, including 7.2% of those under age 18 and 2.2% of those age 65 or over.

== Notable people ==
- William Koepsel (1858–1940), South Dakota Senator
- Charles Lentz (1859–1947), Wisconsin State Representative
- Bartholomew Ringle (1814–1881), Wisconsin State Representative
- John Ringle (1848–1923), Wisconsin State Representative
- Jacob Scharpf (1874–?), Wisconsin State Representative
