= Lewis L. Johnson =

American politician (1880–1943)

Lewis Ludwig Johnson (1880–1943) was an American politician. He was born in Wisconsin and educated in Michigan and Kansas. He was elected twice as a Republican member of the Wisconsin State Assembly. After also serving as a Wisconsin town chairman and justice of the peace, and working for the state of Wisconsin, Johnson died at age 63 and was buried in Minnesota.

== Biography ==
Johnson was born on January 3, 1880, in Rio Creek, Wisconsin. He graduated from Menominee High School in Menominee, Michigan, followed by Bethany College and the Detroit College of Law.

Johnson died on March 14, 1943, in Excelsior, Minnesota. He was buried at Lakewood Cemetery in nearby Minneapolis.

== Career ==
Johnson was elected to the Assembly in 1910 and 1912. He was a member of the Republican Party.

Additionally, Johnson was Chairman of Clay Banks, Wisconsin, and was a justice of the peace. He later worked in the Office of the Wisconsin Insurance Commissioner.
