= Salona, Wisconsin =

- Unincorporated community
- Location within the state of Wisconsin
- Coordinates: 44°44′44″N 87°21′23″W
- Country: United States
- State: Wisconsin
- County: Door
- Town: Clay Banks
- Elevation: 669 ft (204 m)
- Time zone: UTC-6 (Central (CST))
  - Summer (DST): UTC-5 (CDT)
- Area code: 920
- GNIS feature ID: 1578073

Salona is an unincorporated community located 5 1/2 miles south of the city of Sturgeon Bay in the town of Clay Banks, in southern Door County, Wisconsin, United States. County Highway U connects the community to Sturgeon Bay going northbound and Algoma going southbound.

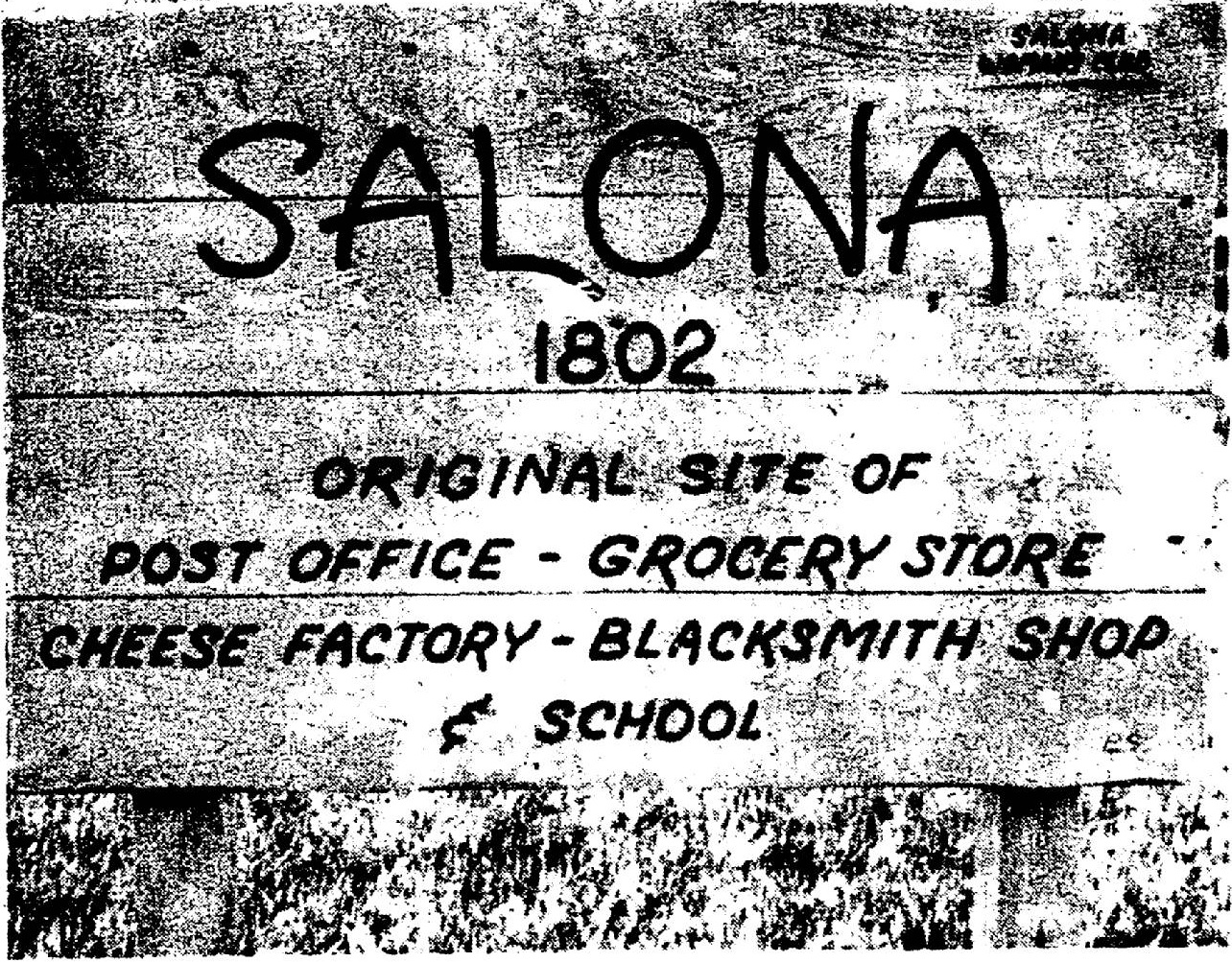
Sign placed by the Salona Woman's Club in 1976 at the corner of County Trunk U and Salona Road
