= Archie McComb =

American politician

Archie McComb was a member of the Wisconsin State Assembly.

== Biography ==
McComb was born on January 22, 1885, in Fort Atkinson, Wisconsin. In 1910, he graduated from the University of Wisconsin Law School. He died in 1968.

== Career ==
McComb was elected to the Assembly in 1912. He was a Republican.
