= Taylor Frye =

American politician

Taylor Frye (1864 – January 14, 1946) was an educator and politician.

Born in Pennsylvania, Frye moved with his parents to Wisconsin in 1875. Frye went to the public schools and graduated from River Falls Normal School. He also took an agriculture course at University of Wisconsin. Frye owned a farm in the village of Fairchild, Eau Claire, Wisconsin. Frye taught in public high schools and in teaches institutes. Frye served as Fairchild Village Treasurer and on the Eau Claire County Board of Supervisors. in 1911, Frye served in the Wisconsin State Assembly and was a Republican. In 1911, Frye moved to Madison, Wisconsin. He was the head of the woman and child labor division of the Wisconsin State Industrial Commission. Frye died in a hospital in Madison, Wisconsin.
