= Oregon (town), Wisconsin =

Town in Dane County, Wisconsin

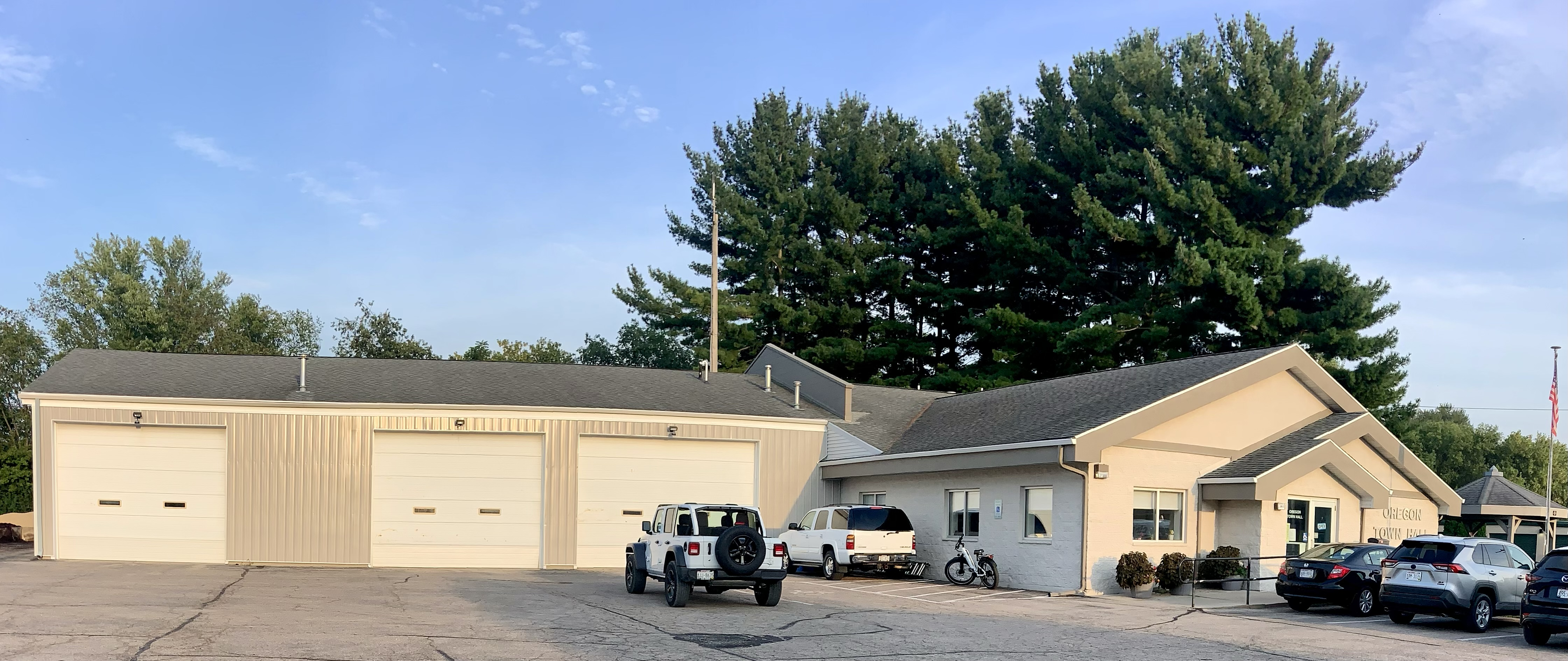
- Town Hall

- Location in Dane County, Wisconsin
- Coordinates: 42°55′30″N 89°23′03″W
- Country: United States
- State: Wisconsin
- County: Dane

Area
  - Total: 30.87 sq mi (80.0 km^{2})
  - Land: 30.73 sq mi (79.6 km^{2})
  - Water: 0.14 sq mi (0.36 km^{2})

Population (2020)
  - Total: 3,125
  - Density: 101.7/sq mi (39.26/km^{2})
- Time zone: UTC-6 (Central (CST))
  - Summer (DST): UTC-5 (CDT)
- Area code(s): 608 and 353
- GNIS feature ID: 1583868
- Website: https://townoforegonwi.gov/

The Town of Oregon is a town in Dane County, Wisconsin, United States. The population was 3,125 at the 2020 census. The village of Oregon is located adjacent to the town and most of its area previously belonged to the town.

== Geography ==
According to the United States Census Bureau, the town has a total area of 32.3 square miles (83.6 km^{2}), of which 32.2 square miles (83.3 km^{2}) is land and 0.1 square mile (0.3 km^{2}) (0.40%) is water.

== Demographics ==
At the 2000 census there were 3,148 people, 1,063 households, and 927 families living in the town. The population density was 97.9 people per square mile (37.8/km^{2}). There were 1,077 housing units at an average density of 33.5 per square mile (12.9/km^{2}). The racial makeup of the town was 98.28% White, 0.16% Black or African American, 0.25% Native American, 0.41% Asian, and 0.89% from two or more races. 0.51% of the population were Hispanic or Latino of any race. Of the 1,063 households 47.1% had children under the age of 18 living with them, 80.4% were married couples living together, 4.0% had a female householder with no husband present, and 12.7% were non-families. 8.6% of households were one person and 2.0% were one person aged 65 or older. The average household size was 2.96 and the average family size was 3.16.

The age distribution was 31.2% under the age of 18, 4.1% from 18 to 24, 30.0% from 25 to 44, 29.0% from 45 to 64, and 5.7% 65 or older. The median age was 39 years. For every 100 females, there were 103.6 males. For every 100 females age 18 and over, there were 102.3 males.

The median household income was $72,250 and the median family income was $76,759. Males had a median income of $50,250 versus $36,150 for females. The per capita income for the town was $28,218. About 0.6% of families and 0.4% of the population were below the poverty line, including none of those under the age of 18 or 65 or over.

== Notable people ==
- Phineas Baldwin, politician
- Edward W. Dwight, politician, lived in the town
- Arthur H. Sholts, politician, lived in the town

== Railroads ==
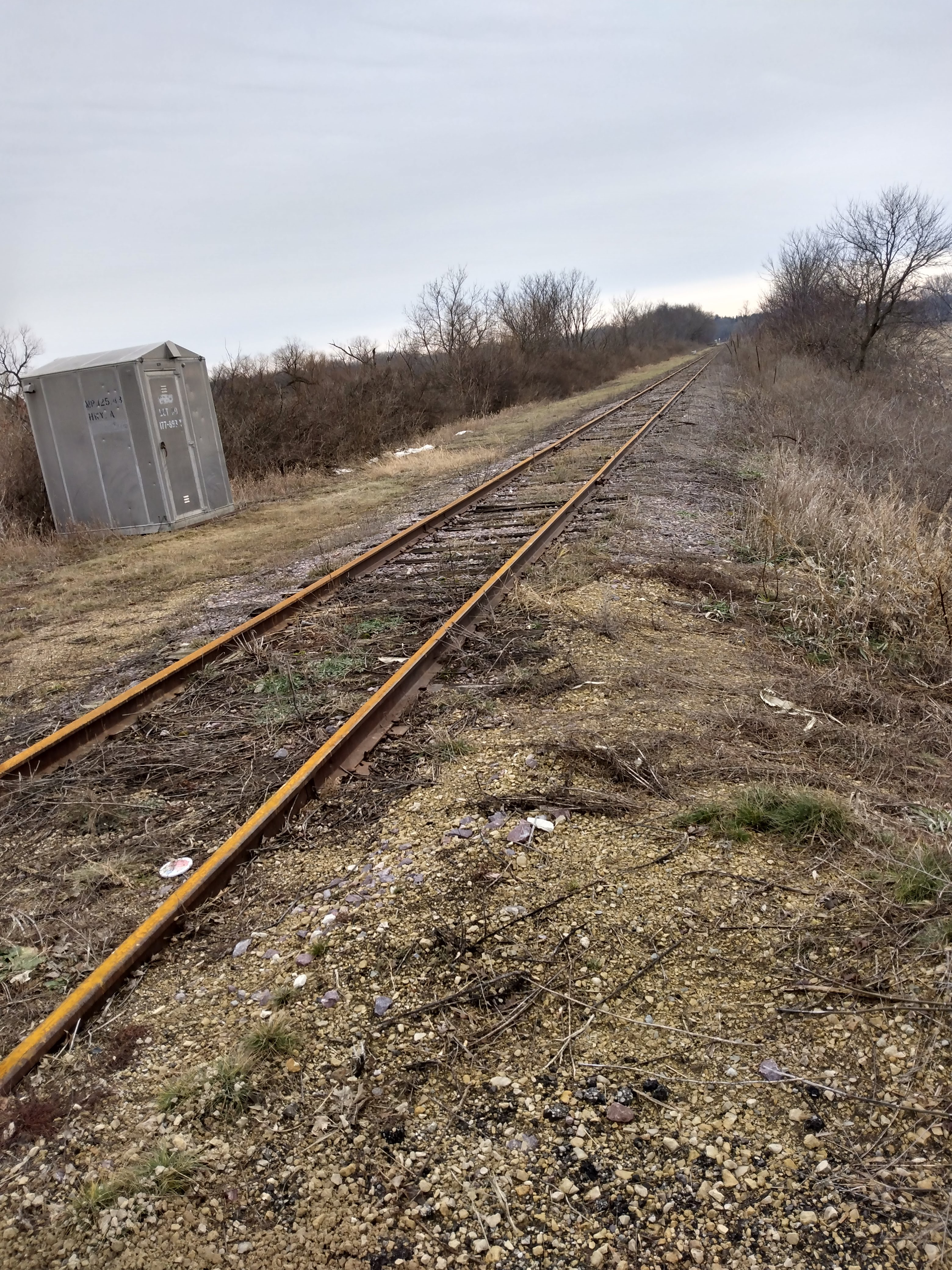
Ex Beloit and Madison Railroad

In the mid-1800s, the Beloit and Madison Railroad was built through the Town of Oregon, later acquired by Chicago and North Western. From 1880 to 1950 the line was double-tracked. The line is currently out of service.
