= Vignes, Wisconsin =

- Unincorporated community
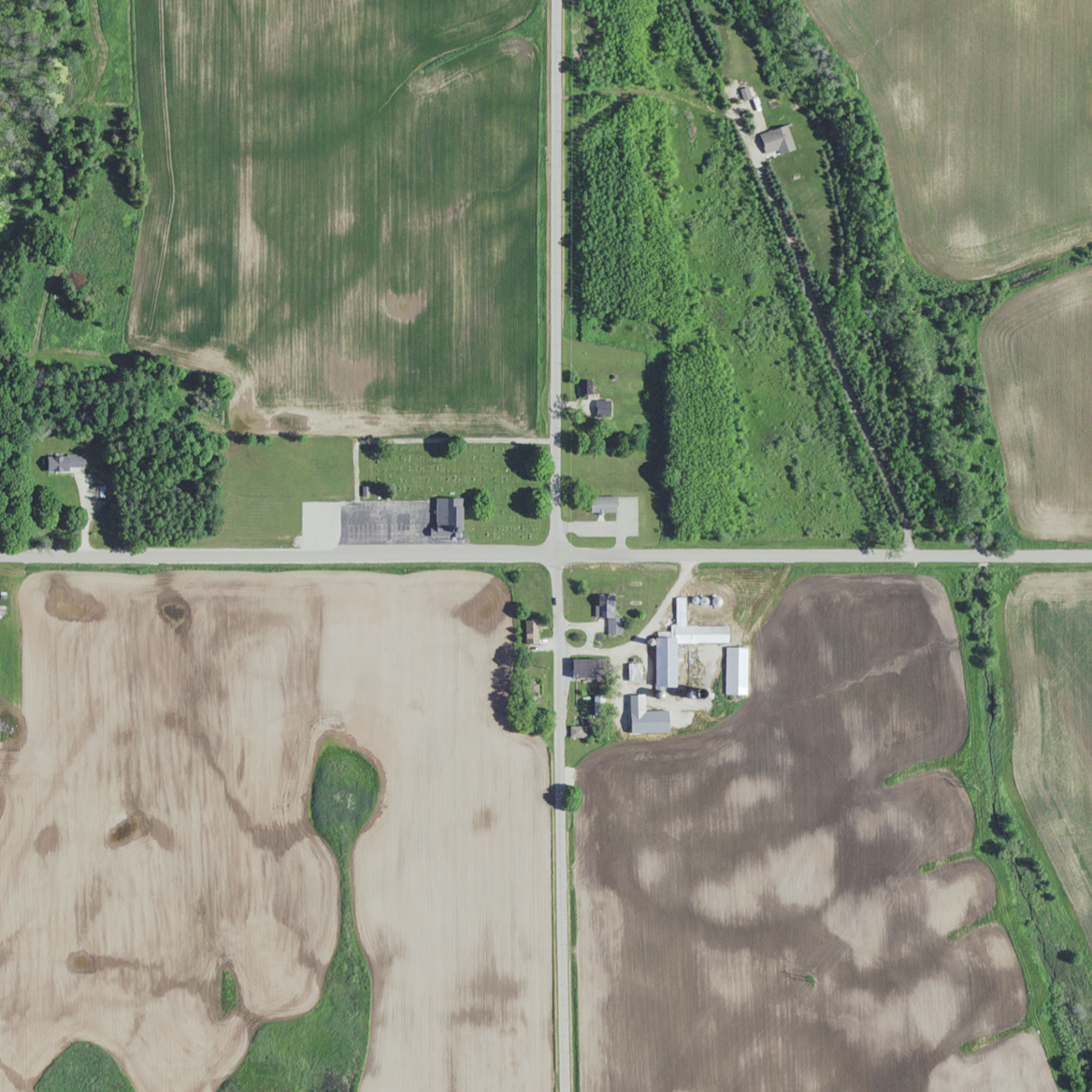
- County Trunk Highway OO runs east–west and S. Shiloh Road runs north–south. Schuyler Creek (right) flows southeast

- Location within the state of Wisconsin
- Coordinates: 44°43′34″N 87°22′39″W
- Country: United States
- State: Wisconsin
- County: Door
- Town: Clay Banks
- Time zone: UTC-6 (Central (CST))
  - Summer (DST): UTC-5 (CDT)
- Area code: 920
- GNIS feature ID: 1576093

Vignes (/ˈvɪɡnɪs/ VIG-niss) is an unincorporated community located in the town of Clay Banks in Door County, Wisconsin, United States. County Highway OO is the main highway to Vignes and connects to County Highway U.
