= Julius C. Gilbertson =

American politician

Julius Charles Gilbertson (June 28, 1875 – February 24, 1933) was an American jurist and politician.

Born in Eau Claire, Wisconsin, Gilbertson graduated from the University of Wisconsin in 1896 and was also admitted to the Wisconsin bar in 1896. Gilbertson practiced law in Eau Claire. In 1898, Gilbertson was elected Eau Claire municipal court judge. He also served as Eau Claire County district attorney. In 1911, Gilbertson served in the Wisconsin State Assembly and was a Republican. Gilbertson died at his home in Eau Claire, Wisconsin from a heart ailment.
