= Chimney Rock, Wisconsin =

- Town
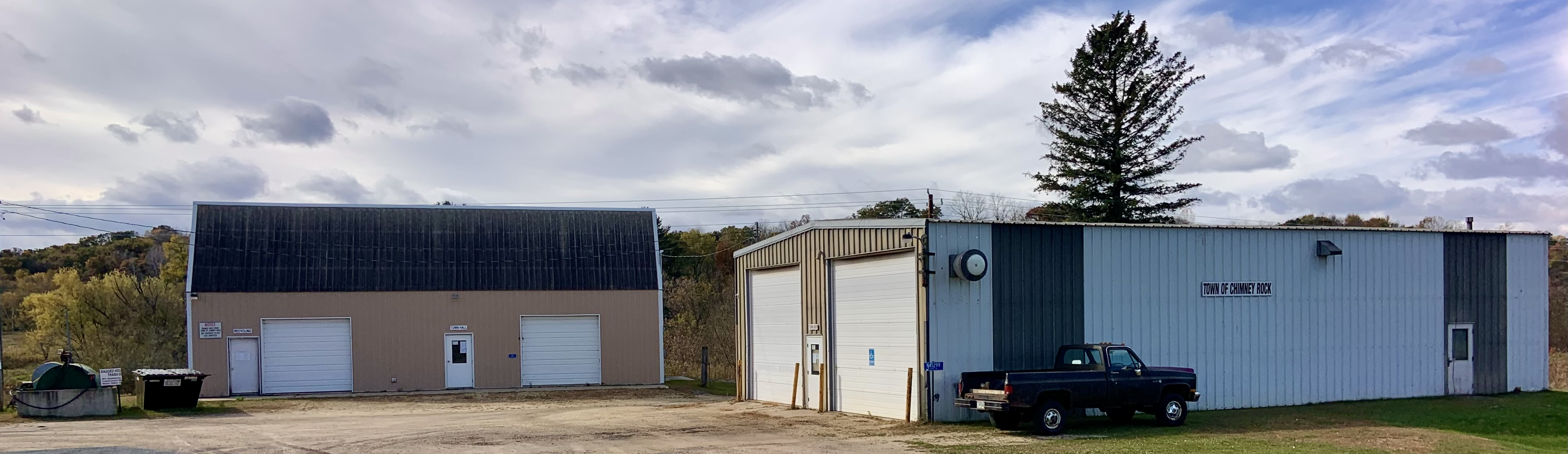
- Town hall

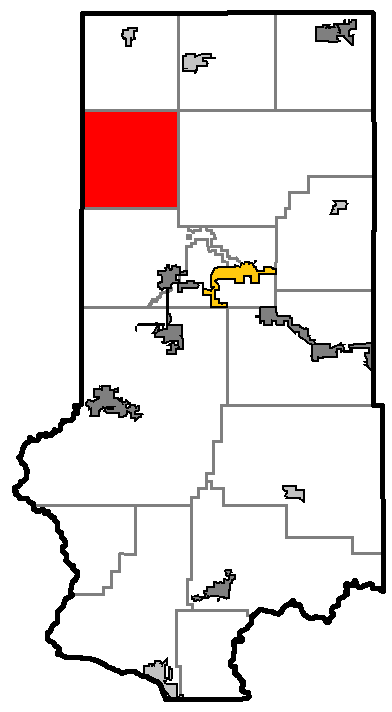
- Location of Chimney Rock, Trempealeau County

- Location of Trempealeau County, Wisconsin
- Coordinates: 44°28′1″N 91°27′19″W
- Country: United States
- State: Wisconsin
- County: Trempealeau

Area
  - Total: 36.1 sq mi (93.5 km^{2})
  - Land: 36.1 sq mi (93.5 km^{2})
  - Water: 0 sq mi (0.0 km^{2})
- Elevation: 902 ft (275 m)

Population (2020)
  - Total: 258
  - Density: 7.15/sq mi (2.76/km^{2})
- Time zone: UTC-6 (Central (CST))
  - Summer (DST): UTC-5 (CDT)
- FIPS code: 55-14525
- GNIS feature ID: 1582956

Chimney Rock is a town in Trempealeau County, Wisconsin, United States. The population was 258 at the 2020 census. The unincorporated community of Russell is located in the town.

== Geography ==
According to the United States Census Bureau, the town has a total area of 36.1 square miles (93.5 km^{2}), all land.

== Demographics ==
As of the census of 2000, there were 276 people, 98 households, and 73 families residing in the town. The population density was 7.6 people per square mile (3.0/km^{2}). There were 104 housing units at an average density of 2.9 per square mile (1.1/km^{2}). The racial makeup of the town was 98.55% White, 0.72% African American and 0.72% Asian. Hispanic or Latino of any race were 0.36% of the population.

There were 98 households, out of which 39.8% had children under the age of 18 living with them, 62.2% were married couples living together, 5.1% had a female householder with no husband present, and 24.5% were non-families. 14.3% of all households were made up of individuals, and 8.2% had someone living alone who was 65 years of age or older. The average household size was 2.82 and the average family size was 3.08.

In the town, the population was spread out, with 27.5% under the age of 18, 8.3% from 18 to 24, 31.5% from 25 to 44, 24.3% from 45 to 64, and 8.3% who were 65 years of age or older. The median age was 35 years. For every 100 females, there were 119.0 males. For every 100 females age 18 and over, there were 122.2 males.

The median income for a household in the town was $44,375, and the median income for a family was $47,083. Males had a median income of $26,563 versus $19,286 for females. The per capita income for the town was $16,010. About 5.5% of families and 10.1% of the population were below the poverty line, including 19.2% of those under the age of eighteen and 15.0% of those 65 or over.

== Notable people ==
- Peter Nelton, farmer and politician, lived in the town
- Russell Paulson, farmer and politician, was born in the town
