= C. F. Viebahn =

American politician (1842–1915)

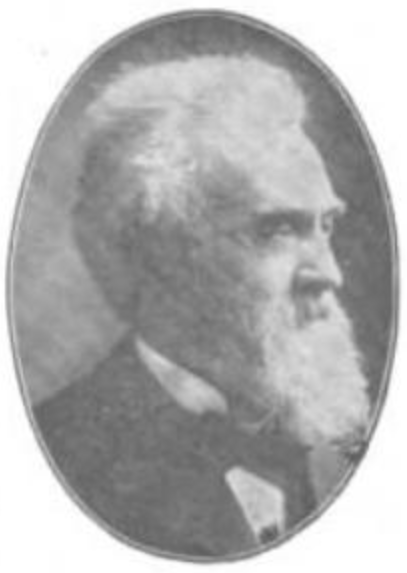

Member of the Wisconsin State Assembly
- In office 1908–1910
- Constituency: Jefferson County First District

Personal details
- Born: Charles F. Viebahn; 1842 Germany
- Died: March 17, 1915 (aged 72–73) Watertown, Wisconsin
- Party: Democratic
- Spouses: Lona Fischer (m. 1868; died 1893) Josephine Hall (m. 1895)
- Children: 1
- Education: University of Wisconsin-Madison
- Occupation: Educator, politician

Charles F. Viebahn (1842 – March 17, 1915) was a member of the Wisconsin State Assembly.

== Biography ==
Viebahn was born in what is now Germany in 1842. In 1851, he moved with his parents to Baraboo, Wisconsin. He attended what is now the University of Wisconsin-Madison and later became principal of Watertown High School in Watertown, Wisconsin.

Viehbahn married Lona Fischer in 1868. They had one son before her death in 1893. In 1895, Viebahn married Josephine Hall, a mother of two. He died of pneumonia at his home in Watertown on March 17, 1915.

== Political career ==
Viebahn was elected to the Assembly in 1908. Additionally, he was Superintendent of Schools of Watertown, as well as of Manitowoc County, Wisconsin and Sauk County, Wisconsin. He was a Democrat.
