= Wilbur E. Hurlbut =

American politician

Wilbur E. Hurlbut (born October 19, 1867, in Franklin County, Vermont) was a member of the Wisconsin State Assembly. He served during the 1911 and 1913 sessions. Additionally during this time, he was a delegate to the 1912 Republican National Convention. Other positions he held include superintendent of public schools of Northfield, Vermont and lawyer.
