= Robert L. Clark =

American politician

Robert L. Clark was a member of the Wisconsin State Assembly.

== Biography ==
Clark was born on January 31, 1872, in St. Joseph, Missouri. He attended Whitewater Normal School.

== Career ==
Clark was elected to the Assembly in 1910. He was a Republican.
