= Arthur H. Sholts =

American politician (1861–1934)

Arthur Hamlin "A. H." Sholts
- Born: February 6, 1861; Rutland, Wisconsin, U.S.
- Died: September 2, 1934 (aged 73); Oregon, Wisconsin, U.S.
- Occupations: Educator, politician

Arthur Hamlin "A. H." Sholts (February 6, 1861 – September 2, 1934) was an American politician.

Born in the town of Rutland, Dane County, Wisconsin, Sholts graduated from Oregon High School in Oregon, Wisconsin. He then graduated from the Whitewater State Teachers College. He was principal of the public schools in Evansville, Stoughton, and Oregon, Wisconsin. In 1907, he moved to his farm in the town of Oregon. Sholts served as chairman of the Oregon Town Board. In 1911, Sholts served in the Wisconsin State Assembly and was a Republican. In 1929, Wisconsin Governor Walter Kohler Sr. appointed Sholts to the Board of Regents of the University of Wisconsin. Sholts died at his home in Oregon, Wisconsin.
