= Fairchild, Wisconsin =

- Village
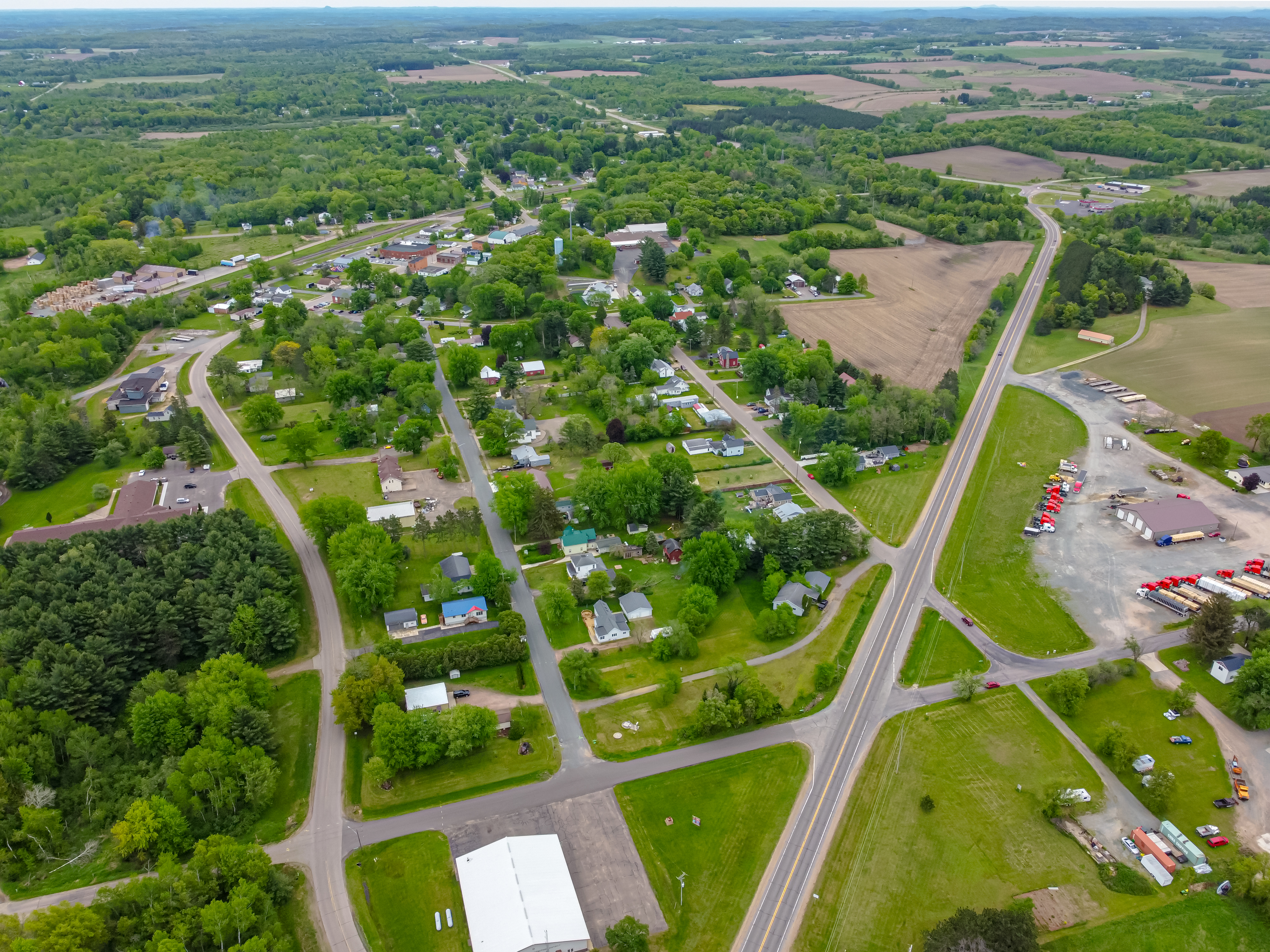
- US-10 and US-12/Wis-27 junction near town

- Location of Fairchild in Eau Claire County, Wisconsin.
- Coordinates: 44°37′31″N 91°0′2″W
- Country: United States
- State: Wisconsin
- County: Eau Claire

Area
  - Total: 1.48 sq mi (3.83 km^{2})
  - Land: 1.46 sq mi (3.77 km^{2})
  - Water: 0.027 sq mi (0.07 km^{2})
- Elevation: 1,020 ft (311 m)

Population (2020)
  - Total: 451
  - Density: 310/sq mi (120/km^{2})
- Time zone: UTC-6 (Central (CST))
  - Summer (DST): UTC-5 (CDT)
- Area codes: 715 & 534
- FIPS code: 55-24850
- GNIS feature ID: 1564804
- Website: https://villageoffairchild.com/

Fairchild is a village in Eau Claire County, Wisconsin, United States. The population was 451 at the 2020 census. The village is located within the Town of Fairchild.

== History ==
The first inhabitants of the area were the Dakota, Ojibwe, and Ho-Chunk tribes.

The West Wisconsin Railway reached the area in 1868, and the Fairchild post office was established in 1870. Starting in 1872 farmers began acquiring land in the area through the Homestead Acts.

Fairchild was incorporated in 1880 and was named for Lucius Fairchild, the 10th Governor of Wisconsin. By the late 1800s the village became a commercial hub due to the logging and railroad enterprises of businessman N.C. Foster.

Local logging ended in 1905, which began the village's decline. During World War II many businesses downsized due to labor shortages. In the late 1940s U.S. Highway 12 was rerouted west and south of Fairchild, and traffic through the village decreased.

== Geography ==
Fairchild is located at 44°35′58″N 90°57′34″W (44.599554, -90.959543).

According to the United States Census Bureau, the village has a total area of 1.48 square miles (3.83 km^{2}), of which 1.45 square miles (3.76 km^{2}) is land and 0.03 square miles (0.08 km^{2}) is water.

The village falls on the intersections of US Highways 10 and 12. It is ten miles east of Interstate 94.

=== Climate ===
The Köppen Climate Classification subtype for this climate is "Dfb" (Warm Summer Continental Climate).

Climate data for Fairchild, Wisconsin
Month	Jan	Feb	Mar	Apr	May	Jun	Jul	Aug	Sep	Oct	Nov	Dec	Year
Mean daily maximum °C (°F)	−7 (19)	−3 (27)	4 (39)	13 (55)	20 (68)	25 (77)	28 (82)	26 (79)	21 (70)	14 (58)	6 (42)	−3 (26)	1 (33)
Mean daily minimum °C (°F)	−18 (0)	−14 (6)	−7 (20)	1 (34)	7 (45)	12 (54)	14 (58)	13 (56)	8 (47)	2 (36)	−4 (25)	−13 (9)	0 (32)
Average precipitation cm (inches)	2.5 (1)	2.0 (0.8)	5.1 (2)	7.1 (2.8)	9.1 (3.6)	11 (4.3)	11 (4.4)	9.9 (3.9)	9.7 (3.8)	5.8 (2.3)	4.8 (1.9)	3.0 (1.2)	81 (32)
Average precipitation days	7	5	8	10	11	11	10	9	10	9	8	7	105
Source: Weatherbase

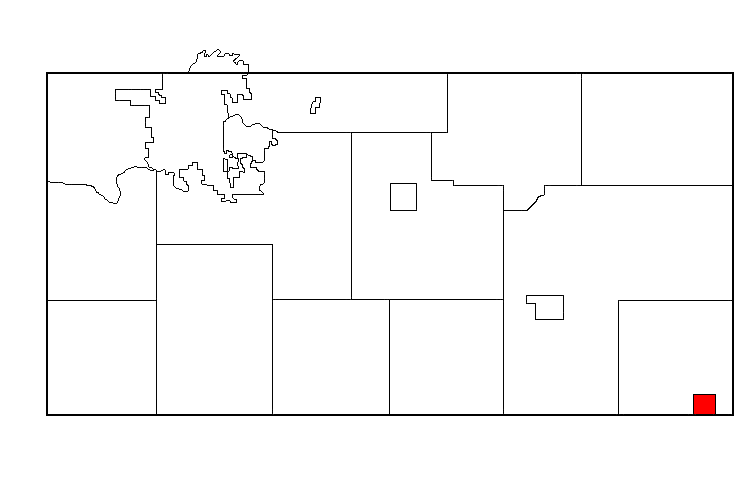
Location of the village of Fairchild within Eau Claire County

== Demographics ==
Historical population
Census	Pop.	Note	%±
1880	304		—
1890	645		112.2%
1900	947		46.8%
1910	678		−28.4%
1920	704		3.8%
1930	1,007		43.0%
1940	1,098		9.0%
1950	1,120		2.0%
1960	1,016		−9.3%
1970	1,020		0.4%
1980	714		−30.0%
1990	504		−29.4%
2000	564		11.9%
2010	550		−2.5%
2020	451		−18.0%
U.S. Decennial Census

=== 2010 census ===
As of the census of 2010, there were 550 people, 227 households, and 148 families residing in the village. The population density was 379.3 inhabitants per square mile (146.4/km^{2}). There were 275 housing units at an average density of 189.7 per square mile (73.2/km^{2}). The racial makeup of the village was 94.2% White, 1.6% Native American, 0.2% Asian, 2.0% from other races, and 2.0% from two or more races. Hispanic or Latino of any race were 2.2% of the population.

There were 227 households, of which 30.8% had children under the age of 18 living with them, 41.9% were married couples living together, 14.1% had a female householder with no husband present, 9.3% had a male householder with no wife present, and 34.8% were non-families. 28.6% of all households were made up of individuals, and 12.8% had someone living alone who was 65 years of age or older. The average household size was 2.42 and the average family size was 2.93.

The median age in the village was 40 years. 24% of residents were under the age of 18; 9.5% were between the ages of 18 and 24; 25.4% were from 25 to 44; 22.7% were from 45 to 64; and 18.4% were 65 years of age or older. The gender makeup of the village was 48.5% male and 51.5% female.

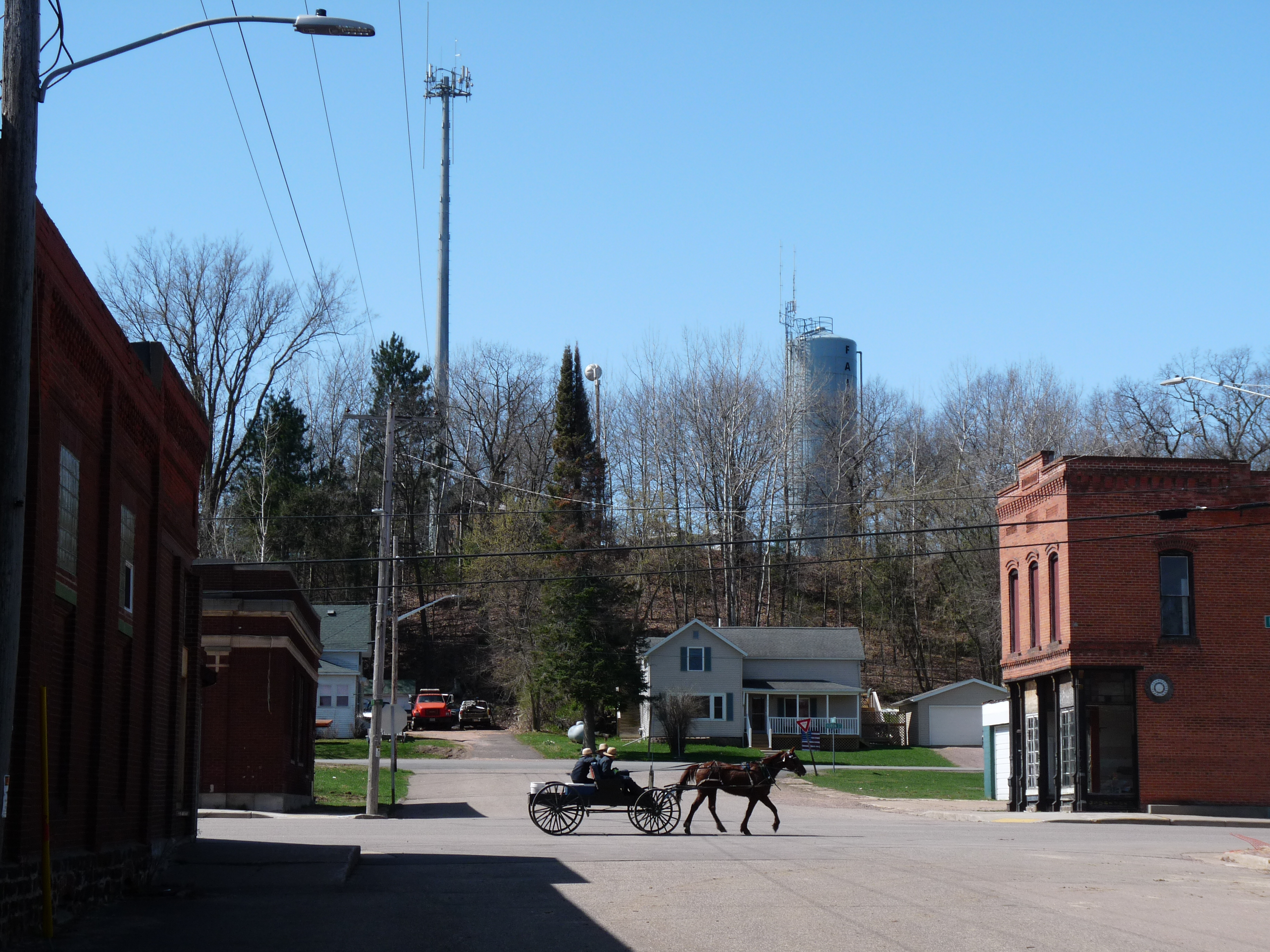
A good number of Amish live in the country around Fairchild

=== 2000 census ===
As of the census of 2000, there were 564 people, 210 households, and 136 families residing in the village. The population density was 387.4 people per square mile (149.2/km^{2}). There were 236 housing units at an average density of 162.1 per square mile (62.4/km^{2}). The racial makeup of the village was 98.40% White, 1.24% Native American, and 0.35% from two or more races. 1.77% of the population were Hispanic or Latino of any race.

There were 210 households, out of which 30.0% had children under the age of 18 living with them, 48.6% were married couples living together, 11.0% had a female householder with no husband present, and 35.2% were non-families. 29.5% of all households were made up of individuals, and 15.2% had someone living alone who was 65 years of age or older. The average household size was 2.50 and the average family size was 3.13.

In the village, the population was spread out, with 27.8% under the age of 18, 7.1% from 18 to 24, 26.8% from 25 to 44, 17.2% from 45 to 64, and 21.1% who were 65 years of age or older. The median age was 37 years. For every 100 females, there were 100.0 males. For every 100 females age 18 and over, there were 104.5 males.

The median income for a household in the village was $23,625, and the median income for a family was $27,500. Males had a median income of $23,750 versus $17,083 for females. The per capita income for the village was $12,729. About 12.7% of families and 18.0% of the population were below the poverty line, including 23.9% of those under age 18 and 32.5% of those age 65 or over.

== Public library ==
The Fairchild Public Library is considered the heart of the community, with an area dedicated to children's programing for elementary school students. They also provide assistance to adults working towards completing their GEDs.

=== Carole Landis display ===
The library has a display of memorabilia connected to actress Carole Landis, who was born in the village. They have copies of several Landis' films, plus there is a statue of Landis, commissioned and donated by one of the actress' fans.

== Media ==
- WEAU – television station in Eau Claire
- WAXX – radio station in Eau Claire

== Notable people ==
- Taylor Frye, Wisconsin State Representative
- George S. Graves, Wisconsin State Representative
- Carole Landis, actress
- Louis V. Mato, Wisconsin State Representative
