= Mathias J. Scholey =

American politician

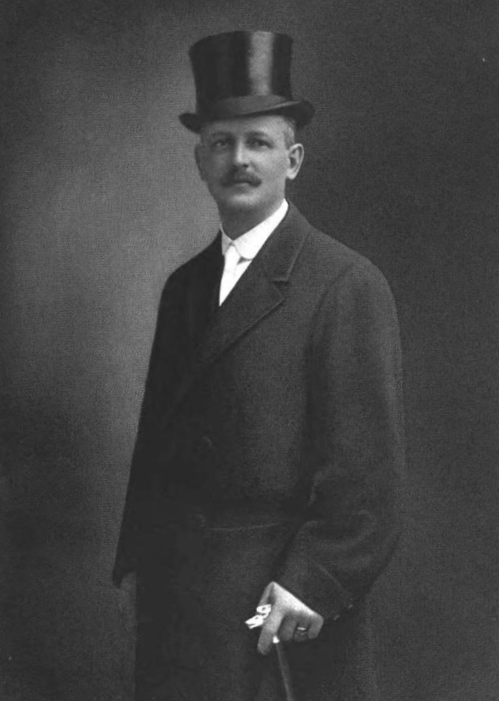

Mayor of Kenosha, Wisconsin
- In office 1908, 1910, 1914

Member of the Wisconsin State Assembly
- In office 1911

Personal details
- Born: August 31, 1867 Brighton, Kenosha County, Wisconsin
- Died: June 11, 1917 (aged 49) Chicago, Illinois
- Party: Democratic
- Occupation: Businessman, politician

Mathias J. "M. J." Scholey (August 31, 1867 – June 11, 1917) was an American businessman and politician.

== Biography ==
Born in the town of Brighton, Kenosha County, Wisconsin, Scholey worked for the Bain Wagon Company and then the Northwestern Railway Company. Scholey worked as a carpenter. He was then involved in the wholesale liquor business. Scholey served on the Kenosha Common Council and was mayor of Kenosha for three terms in 1908, 1910, and 1914. In 1911, Scholey served in the Wisconsin State Assembly and was a Democrat. Scholey died in a hospital in Chicago, Illinois, following surgery for an intestinal obstruction.
