= Henry V. Schwalbach =

American politician

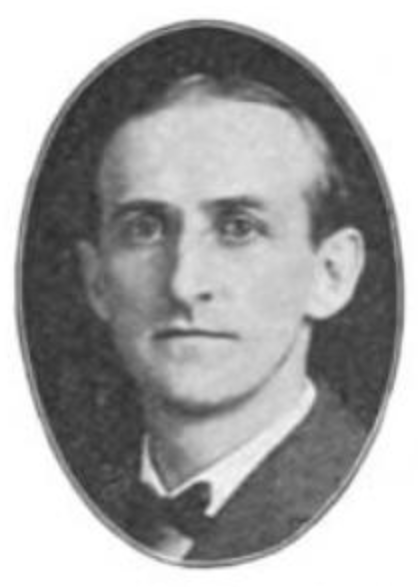

Member of the Wisconsin State Assembly
- In office 1908–1912
- Constituency: Washington County

Personal details
- Born: April 24, 1878 South Germantown, Wisconsin
- Died: February 25, 1958 (aged 79) Milwaukee, Wisconsin
- Party: Democratic
- Occupation: Businessman, politician

Henry V. Schwalbach (April 24, 1878 – February 25, 1958) was an American businessman and politician.

Born in South Germantown, Wisconsin, Schwalbach was in the general merchandise business in South Germantown. In 1909 and 1911, Schwalbach served in the Wisconsin State Assembly and was a Democrat. In 1933, President Franklin Roosevelt appointed Schwalbach customs collector for the District of Wisconsin; Schwalbach served until 1951.

He died in Milwaukee on February 25, 1958.
