= Charles Lentz =

Charles Lentz was an American politician. He was a member of the Wisconsin State Assembly.

== Biography ==
Lentz was formally named Carl Friedrich Albert Lentz. He was born on October 28, 1859 in Herman, Dodge County, Wisconsin.

In 1883, Lentz married Ida Carolina Emilie Gentz. The couple would have seven children.

Lentz died on January 30, 1947 and he was buried in Mayville, Wisconsin. Ida died a few months later and was buried next to him.

== Career ==
Lentz was first elected to the Assembly as a Democrat in 1908. He was re-elected in 1910 and 1912.

Prior to that, Lentz was elected as Sheriff of Dodge County, Wisconsin in 1904. Additionally, he was Chairman and Clerk of Herman.
