= John E. McConnell =

American politician (1863–1928)

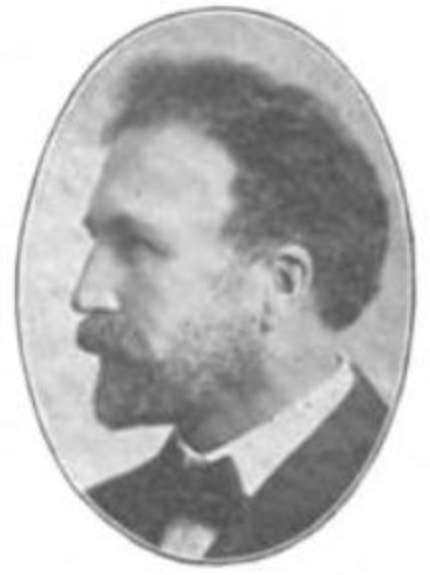

Member of the Wisconsin State Assembly
- In office 1908–1910
- Constituency: La Crosse County First District

Personal details
- Born: December 6, 1863 Farmington, La Crosse County, Wisconsin
- Died: July 13, 1928 (aged 64) La Crosse, Wisconsin
- Party: Republican
- Occupation: Lawyer, politician

John E. McConnell (December 6, 1863 – July 13, 1928) was a member of the Wisconsin State Assembly.

== Biography ==
McConnell was born on December 6, 1863, in Farmington, La Crosse County, Wisconsin. He graduated from the University of Wisconsin–Madison in 1887. McConnell was elected to the Assembly in 1908. Previously, he was District Attorney of La Crosse County, Wisconsin, and chairman of the Republican Committee of La Crosse County. He died in La Crosse, Wisconsin, on July 13, 1928.
