= Hancock (town), Wisconsin =

Town in Waushara County, Wisconsin

Hancock, Wisconsin
- Town
- Town of Hancock
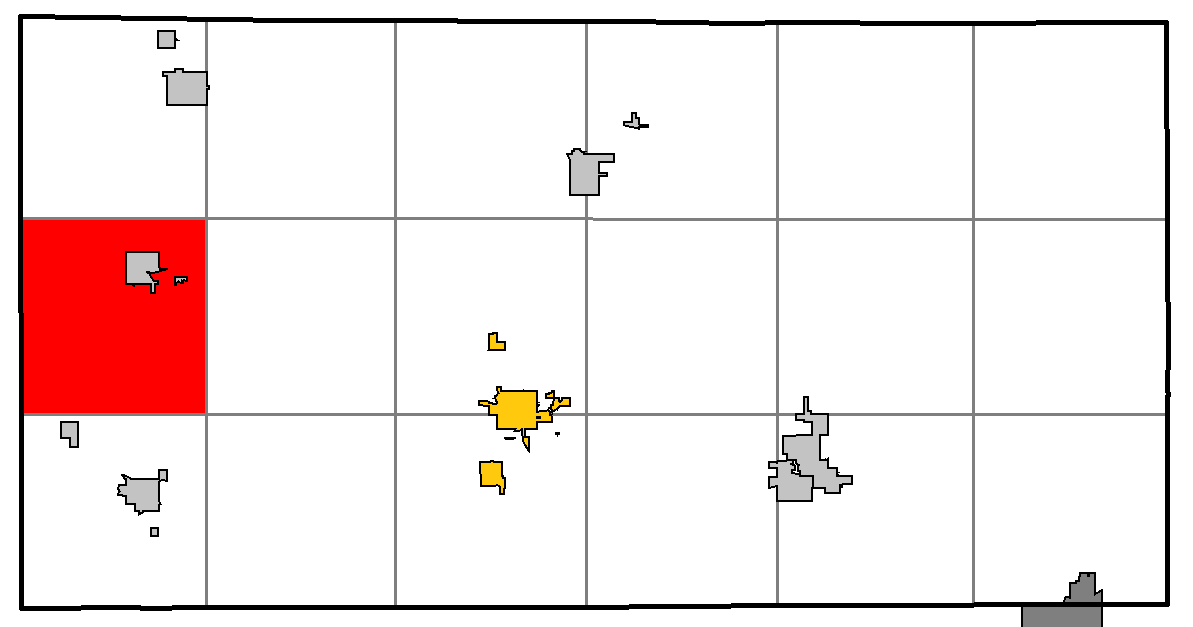
- Location of Hancock, Waushara County, Wisconsin

- Location of Waushara County, Wisconsin
- Coordinates: 44°06′55″N 89°32′07″W
- Country: United States
- State: Wisconsin
- County: Waushara

Area
  - Total: 33.76 sq mi (87.4 km^{2})
  - Land: 33.41 sq mi (86.5 km^{2})
  - Water: 0.35 sq mi (0.91 km^{2})

Population (2020)
  - Total: 558
  - Density: 16.7/sq mi (6.45/km^{2})
- Time zone: UTC-6 (Central (CST))
  - Summer (DST): UTC-5 (CDT)
- Area code(s): 920 and 274
- GNIS feature ID: 1583346

Hancock, founded in 1850, is a town in Waushara County, Wisconsin, United States. The population was 558 at the 2020 census. The Village of Hancock is located within the town.

== Geography ==
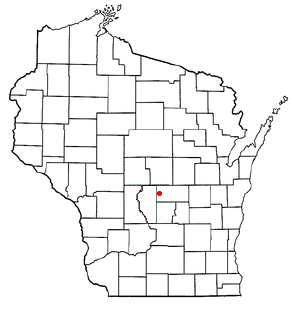
Location of Hancock (town), Wisconsin

According to the United States Census Bureau, the town has a total area of 33.8 square miles (87.4 km^{2}), of which 33.5 square miles (86.6 km^{2}) is land and 0.3 square mile (0.8 km^{2}) (0.89%) is water. Hancock lies off Interstate 39 on County Highway V.

== Demographics ==
As of the census of 2000, there were 531 people, 211 households, and 147 families residing in the town. The population density was 15.9 people per square mile (6.1/km^{2}). There were 384 housing units at an average density of 11.5 per square mile (4.4/km^{2}). The racial makeup of the town was 96.80% White, 0.38% Native American, 0.38% Asian, 2.26% from other races, and 0.19% from two or more races. 4.71% of the population were Hispanic or Latino of any race.

There were 211 households, out of which 23.7% had children under the age of 18 living with them, 62.6% were married couples living together, 4.7% had a female householder with no husband present, and 29.9% were non-families. 24.6% of all households were made up of individuals, and 9.0% had someone living alone who was 65 years of age or older. The average household size was 2.52 and the average family size was 3.04.

In the town, the population was spread out, with 25.2% under the age of 18, 4.1% from 18 to 24, 23.2% from 25 to 44, 32.2% from 45 to 64, and 15.3% who were 65 years of age or older. The median age was 43 years. For every 100 females, there were 109.9 males. For every 100 females age 18 and over, there were 104.6 males.

The median income for a household in the town was $43,889, and the median income for a family was $45,556. Males had a median income of $32,250 versus $20,500 for females. The per capita income for the town was $18,345. None of the families and 3.7% of the population were living below the poverty line, including no under eighteens and 8.1% of those over 64.
