= Carl H. Dorner =

American politician

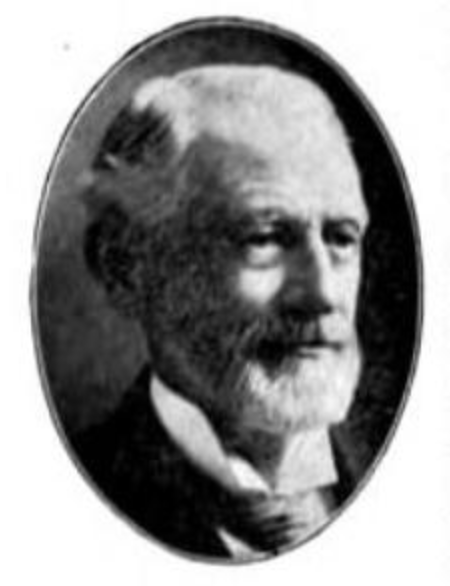

Member of the Wisconsin State Assembly
- In office 1908 – August 13, 1911
- Constituency: Milwaukee County Fourth District

Personal details
- Born: Carl Herman Dorner; December 22, 1837 Hamburg
- Died: August 13, 1911 (aged 73) Okauchee Lake, Wisconsin
- Party: Republican
- Education: University of Jena; Leipzig University
- Occupation: Academic administrator, politician

Carl Herman Dorner (December 22, 1837 – August 13, 1911) was a member of the Wisconsin State Assembly.

== Biography ==
Dorner was born on December 22, 1837, in what is now Hamburg, Germany. He attended the University of Jena and Leipzig University.

From 1871 to 1875, Dorner directed the Zoological Garden of Hamburg. He later helped layout and organize the Cincinnati Zoo and Botanical Garden. Dorner went on to join the faculty of the German-English Academy in Milwaukee, Wisconsin, eventually becoming its principal.

Dorner died on August 13, 1911, at his daughter's summer home in Okauchee Lake. He was buried in Milwaukee.

== Political career ==
Dorner was a member of the Assembly for Milwaukee County's Fourth District from 1908 until his death. Additionally, he was a member of the Milwaukee County Board of Supervisors from 1904 to 1908. He was a Republican.
