= Peter Nelton =

American politician (1853–1936)

Peter Nelton (1853–1936) was a member of the Wisconsin State Assembly.

== Biography ==
Nelton was born on October 13, 1853. He went on to reside on a farm in Chimney Rock, Wisconsin.

== Political career ==
Nelton was elected to the Assembly in 1910. Additionally, he was chairman of the town board (similar to city council) of Chimney Rock. He was a Democrat.
