= 59th Wisconsin Legislature =

Wisconsin legislative term for 1929–1930

←	58th	60th	→
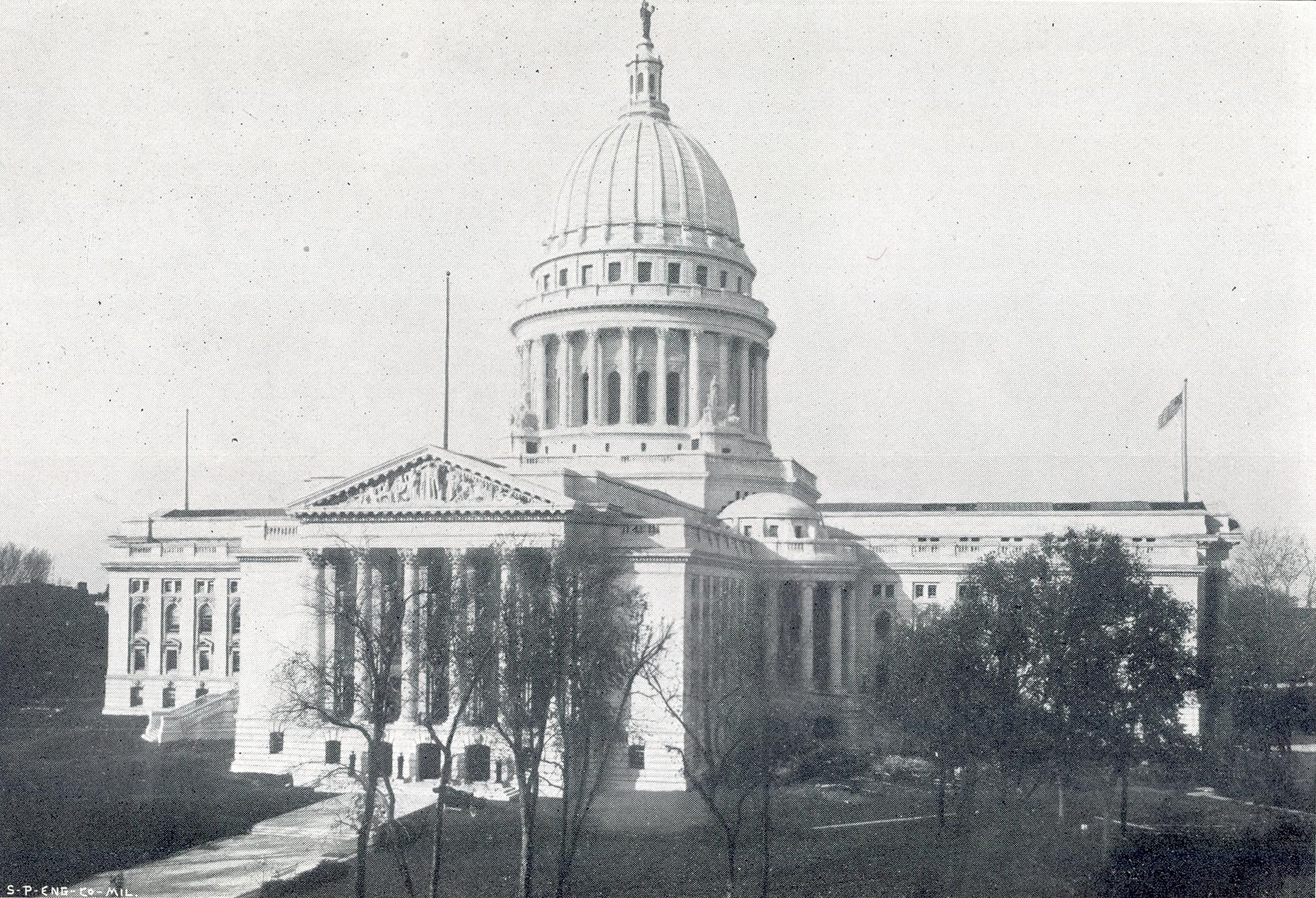
- Wisconsin State Capitol ca.1915

Overview
- Legislative body: Wisconsin Legislature
- Meeting place: Wisconsin State Capitol
- Term: January 7, 1929 – January 5, 1931
- Election: November 6, 1928

Senate
- Members: 33
- Senate President: Henry Huber (R)
- President pro tempore: Oscar Morris (R)
- Party control: Republican

Assembly
- Members: 100
- Assembly Speaker: Charles B. Perry (R)
- Party control: Republican

Sessions
- Regular: January 9, 1929 – September 20, 1929

The Fifty-Ninth Wisconsin Legislature convened from January 9, 1929, to September 20, 1929, in regular session.

Senators representing even-numbered districts were newly elected for this session and were serving the first two years of a four-year term. Assembly members were elected to a two-year term. Assembly members and even-numbered senators were elected in the general election of November 6, 1928. Senators representing odd-numbered districts were serving the third and fourth year of a four-year term, having been elected in the general election of November 2, 1926.

The governor of Wisconsin during this entire term was Republican Walter J. Kohler Sr., of Sheboygan County, serving a two-year term, having won election in the 1928 Wisconsin gubernatorial election.

== Major events ==
- January 7, 1929: Inauguration of Walter J. Kohler Sr. as the 26th Governor of Wisconsin.
- March 4, 1929: Inauguration of Herbert Hoover as the 31st President of the United States
- March 23, 1929: Wisconsin chief justice Aad J. Vinje died in office. Justice Marvin B. Rosenberry immediately succeeded to the position of chief justice due to the rule of seniority.
- April 2, 1929: 1929 Wisconsin Spring general election:
  - Wisconsin voters approved two amendments to the state constitution:
    - Allowing legislators to set their own salary by law rather than fixing the salary in the constitution. This was the sixth attempt in 20 years to amend the constitution to allow some adjustment to legislator salary, all the previous attempts failed.
    - Sheriffs were allowed to serve two consecutive terms in office.
  - Wisconsin voters approved an advisory (non-binding) referendum calling for modification of the federal prohibition law.
- April 12, 1929: Governor Walter J. Kohler Sr. appointed Chester A. Fowler to the Wisconsin Supreme Court to succeed the deceased justice Aad J. Vinje.
- May 1, 1929: Wisconsin Supreme Court justice Christian Doerfler resigned due to poor health.
- June 3, 1929: Governor Walter J. Kohler Sr. appointed Oscar M. Fritz to the Wisconsin Supreme Court to succeed the retired justice Christian Doerfler.
- July 27, 1929: The Geneva Convention on Prisoners of War was signed by 37 nations, including the United States.
- October 24–29, 1929: The Wall Street Crash of 1929 wiped out more than $30 Billion worth of value from the New York Stock Exchange (over $530 Billion adjusted for inflation), one of the inciting events of the Great Depression.
- October 25, 1929: Former U.S. Secretary of the Interior Albert B. Fall was convicted of bribery for his role in the Teapot Dome scandal, becoming the first Presidential cabinet member to go to prison for actions in office.
- November 14, 1929: Wisconsin Supreme Court justice Franz C. Eschweiler died in office.
- December 15, 1929: The Green Bay Packers were the champions of the 1929 NFL season.
- April 4, 1930: Governor Walter J. Kohler Sr. appointed Edward T. Fairchild to the Wisconsin Supreme Court to succeed the deceased justice Franz C. Eschweiler.
- May 2, 1930: Wisconsin Supreme Court justice Charles H. Crownhart died in office.
- June 17, 1930: U.S. President Herbert Hoover signed the Smoot–Hawley Tariff Act, enacting some of the highest tariffs in U.S. history.
- July 13, 1930: Wisconsin congressman Florian Lampert (WI-06) died in office.
- August 25, 1930: Wisconsin Supreme Court justice E. Ray Stevens died in office.
- September 16, 1930: Incumbent Wisconsin governor Walter J. Kohler Sr. lost renomination in the Republican primary (in the ongoing intra-party feud, the progressive Philip La Follette defeated the stalwart Kohler).
- September 25, 1930: Governor Walter J. Kohler Sr. appointed John D. Wickhem to the Wisconsin Supreme Court to succeed the deceased justice Charles H. Crownhart.
- September 26, 1930: Governor Walter J. Kohler Sr. appointed George B. Nelson to the Wisconsin Supreme Court to succeed the deceased justice E. Ray Stevens.
- November 4, 1930: 1930 United States general election:
  - Philip La Follette elected Governor of Wisconsin.
  - Wisconsin voters approved an amendment to the state constitution granting the Governor the power of a partial veto on appropriation bills.
- December 14, 1930: The Green Bay Packers were the champions of the 1930 NFL season.

== Major legislation ==
- August 30, 1929: An Act ... relating to a children's code for Wisconsin and providing penalties, 1929 Act 439. Wisconsin's Children's Code, created a comprehensive set of state laws around child welfare and juvenile justice.
- September 12, 1929: An Act ... relating to the consolidation of the departments of agriculture, the dairy and food commissioner, the department of markets, the state treasury agent, the state supervisor of inspectors of illuminating oils and the state humane agent in a new department of agriculture tind markets, and making appropriations, 1929 Act 479. Consolidated several state agencies and commissions into the Wisconsin Department of Agriculture and Markets.
- 1929 Joint Resolution 6: Joint Resolution to amend section 21 of Article IV of the constitution, relating to the compensation of members of the legislature, so as to in effect repeal such section, and the submission of this amendment to a vote of the people at the April election of 1929. Second legislative passage of a proposed amendment to the state constitution to remove the constitution's prescriptive section on legislator pay and instead allow legislator pay to be set by the normal legislative process. This amendment was ratified by voters at the April 1929 election.
- 1929 Joint Resolution 13: Joint Resolution to amend section 4 of Article VI of the constitution, relating to the election of sheriffs and to submit this amendment to a vote of the people at the April election of 1929. Second legislative passage of a proposed amendment to the state constitution to allow sheriffs to serve two consecutive terms. This amendment was ratified by voters at the April 1929 election.
- 1929 Joint Resolution 43: Joint Resolution to amend section 10 of article V of the constitution, relating to the approval of bills by the governor, and to submit this amendment to vote of the people at the general election in November, 1930. Second legislative passaged of a proposed amendment to the state constitution to grant the Governor the power of a partial veto on appropriation bills. This amendment was ratified by voters at the November 1930 election.
- 1929 Joint Resolution 69: Joint Resolution to amend section 5 of Article V of the constitution, relating to the compensation of the governor, so as to in effect repeal the said section. First legislative passage of a proposed amendment to the state constitution to remove the constitution's prescriptive section on gubernatorial salary and instead allow the Governor's salary to be set through the normal legislative process. This amendment would eventually be ratified at the November 1932 election.
- 1929 Joint Resolution 70: Joint Resolution to amend section 9 of Article V of the constitution, relating to the compensation of the lieutenant governor, so as to in effect repeal this section. First legislative passage of a proposed amendment to the state constitution to remove the constitution's prescriptive section on Lieutenant Governor's salary and instead allow the Lieutenant Governor's salary to be set through the normal legislative process. This amendment would eventually be ratified at the November 1932 election.
- 1929 Joint Resolution 72: Joint Resolution to amend Section 1 of Article VII of the constitution, relating to impeachments. First legislative passage of a proposed amendment to the state constitution making technical corrections to the impeachment section of the constitution. This amendment would eventually be ratified at the November 1932 election.
- 1929 Joint Resolution 74: Joint Resolution to amend section 3 of article XI of the constitution, relating to indebtedness secured by public utility and other income producing property of municipalities. First legislative passage of a proposed amendment to the state constitution making additional allowances for municipal indebtedness. This amendment would eventually be ratified at the November 1932 election.

== Party summary ==
=== Senate summary ===
Senate partisan composition Socialist: 2 seats Republican: 31 seats

	Party (Shading indicates majority caucus)			Total	
	Dem.	Soc.	Rep.	Total	Vacant
End of previous Legislature	0	2	31	33	0
Start of Reg. Session	0	2	31	33	0
Final voting share	6.06%		93.94%		
Beginning of the next Legislature	1	2	30	33	0

=== Assembly summary ===
Assembly partisan composition Democratic: 5 seats Socialist: 3 seats Independent: 1 seat Republican: 91 seats

	Party (Shading indicates majority caucus)				Total	
	Dem.	Soc.	Ind.	Rep.	Total	Vacant
End of previous Legislature	2	8	1	89	100	0
Start of Reg. Session	5	3	1	91	100	0
From July 28, 1930 (Note: Republican C. N. Saugen (Eau Claire County) died.)	5	3	1	90	99	1
Final voting share	9.09%			90.91%		
Beginning of the next Legislature	3	9	0	88	100	0

== Sessions ==
- Regular session: January 9, 1929 – September 20, 1929

== Leaders ==
=== Senate leadership ===
- President of the Senate: Henry Huber (R)
- President pro tempore: Oscar Morris (R–Milwaukee)

=== Assembly leadership ===
- Speaker of the Assembly: Charles B. Perry (R–Wauwatosa)

== Members ==
=== Members of the Senate ===
Members of the Senate for the Fifty-Ninth Wisconsin Legislature:

Senate partisan representation Socialist: 2 seats Republican: 31 seats

Dist.	Counties	Senator	Residence	Party
01	Door, Kewaunee, & Manitowoc	John E. Cashman	Denmark	Rep.
02	Brown & Oconto	Elmer Hall	Green Bay	Rep.
03	Milwaukee (South City)	Walter Polakowski	Milwaukee	Soc.
04	Milwaukee (Northeast County & Northeast City)	Oscar Morris	Milwaukee	Rep.
05	Milwaukee (Northwest City)	Bernhard Gettelman	Milwaukee	Rep.
06	Milwaukee (North-Central City)	Thomas M. Duncan	Milwaukee	Soc.
07	Milwaukee (Southeast County & Southeast City)	Herbert H. Smith	Milwaukee	Rep.
08	Milwaukee (Western County)	Harry Daggett	Milwaukee	Rep.
09	Milwaukee (City Downtown)	Irving P. Mehigan	Milwaukee	Rep.
10	Buffalo, Pepin, Pierce, & St. Croix	Walter H. Hunt	River Falls	Rep.
11	Bayfield, Burnett, Douglas, & Washburn	R. Bruce Johnson	Superior	Rep.
12	Ashland, Iron, Price, Rusk, Sawyer, & Vilas	James H. Carroll	Glidden	Rep.
13	Dodge & Washington	William H. Markham	Horicon	Rep.
14	Outagamie & Shawano	Anton M. Miller	Kaukauna	Rep.
15	Rock	George W. Blanchard	Edgerton	Rep.
16	Crawford, Grant, & Vernon	Edward J. Roethe	Fennimore	Rep.
17	Green, Iowa, & Lafayette	Charles W. Hutchison	Mineral Point	Rep.
18	Fond du Lac, Green Lake & Waushara	L. J. Fellenz	Fond du Lac	Rep.
19	Calumet & Winnebago	Merritt F. White	Winneconne	Rep.
20	Ozaukee & Sheboygan	Herman E. Boldt	Sheboygan Falls	Rep.
21	Racine	Walter S. Goodland	Racine	Rep.
22	Kenosha & Walworth	Conrad Shearer	Kenosha	Rep.
23	Portage & Waupaca	Herman J. Severson	Iola	Prog.Rep.
24	Clark, Taylor, & Wood	Walter J. Rush	Neillsville	Rep.
25	Lincoln & Marathon	Otto Mueller	Wausau	Rep.
26	Dane	Glenn D. Roberts	Madison	Rep.
27	Columbia, Richland, & Sauk	Robert Caldwell	Lodi	Rep.
28	Chippewa & Eau Claire	Peter J. Smith	Eau Claire	Rep.
29	Barron, Dunn, & Polk	Carl B. Casperson	Frederic	Rep.
30	Florence, Forest, Langlade, Marinette, & Oneida	James A. Barker	Antigo	Rep.
31	Adams, Juneau, Monroe, & Marquette	Howard Teasdale	Sparta	Rep.
32	Jackson, La Crosse, & Trempealeau	V. S. Keppel	Holmen	Rep.
33	Jefferson & Waukesha	John C. Schumann	Watertown	Rep.

=== Members of the Assembly ===
Members of the Assembly for the Fifty-Ninth Wisconsin Legislature:

Assembly partisan composition Democratic: 5 seats Socialist: 3 seats Independent: 1 seat Republican: 91 seats

Milwaukee County districts

Senate Dist.	County	Dist.	Representative	Party	Residence
31	Adams & Marquette		George W. Bingham	Rep.	Friendship
12	Ashland		Lawrence A. Lamoreux	Rep.	Ashland
29	Barron		Charles A. Beggs	Rep.	Rice Lake
11	Bayfield		Robert A. Nixon	Rep.	Washburn
02	Brown	1	Harold C. Malchow	Rep.	Green Bay
02	Brown	2	E. F. Brunette	Dem.	Howard
10	Buffalo & Pepin		Arthur A. Hitt	Rep.	Alma
11	Burnett & Washburn		Louis Thayer	Rep.	Birchwood
19	Calumet		Charles A. Barnard	Rep.	Brillion
28	Chippewa		Gustave Rheingans	Prog.Rep.	Chippewa Falls
24	Clark		Arlo Huckstead	Rep.	Neillsville
27	Columbia		E. Myrwyn Rowlands	Rep.	Cambria
16	Crawford		Archie J. McDowell	Rep.	Soldiers Grove
26	Dane	1	Alvin C. Reis	Rep.	Madison
26	Dane	2	James C. Hanson	Rep.	Deerfield
26	Dane	3	Albert J. Baker	Rep.	Mount Horeb
13	Dodge	1	John M. Dihring	Rep.	Brownsville
13	Dodge	2	Fred E. Moul	Rep.	Burnett
01	Door		Moulton Goff	Rep.	Sturgeon Bay
11	Douglas	1	Roy L. Pinn	Prog.Rep.	Superior
11	Douglas	2	Philip E. Nelson	Rep.	Maple
29	Dunn		James D. Millar	Rep.	Menomonie
28	Eau Claire		C. N. Saugen	Rep.	Pleasant Valley
30	Florence, Forest, & Oneida		Joseph D. Grandine	Rep.	Argonne
18	Fond du Lac	1	Carlton W. Mauthe	Rep.	Fond du Lac
18	Fond du Lac	2	Walter N. Beck	Rep.	Campbellsport
16	Grant	1	Harry E. Stephens	Rep.	Platteville
16	Grant	2	Leroy D. Eastman	Rep.	Lancaster
17	Green		Ernst J. Hoesly	Prog.Rep.	New Glarus
18	Green Lake & Waushara		George M. O'Connor	Rep.	Hancock
17	Iowa		John S. Jackson	Rep.	Mineral Point
12	Iron & Vilas		Charles L. Lacy	Rep.	Mercer
32	Jackson		Emil G. Gilbertson	Rep.	Black River Falls
33	Jefferson		Don V. Smith	Rep.	Lake Mills
31	Juneau		Orland S. Loomis	Rep.	Mauston
22	Kenosha	1	C. Ernest Dewey	Rep.	Kenosha
22	Kenosha	2	August J. Piper	Rep.	Somers
01	Kewaunee		Anton G. Schauer	Rep.	Kewaunee
32	La Crosse	1	John Mulder	Rep.	La Crosse
32	La Crosse	2	William F. Miller	Rep.	West Salem
17	Lafayette		S. Dell Penniston	Rep.	Argyle
30	Langlade		John R. Fronek	Rep.	Antigo
25	Lincoln		Paul Gebert Sr.	Rep.	Merrill
01	Manitowoc	1	John Lorfeld	Rep.	Cleveland
01	Manitowoc	2	Thomas A. Sullivan	Rep.	Reedsville
25	Marathon	1	Joseph L. Barber	Rep.	Marathon
25	Marathon	2	Henry Ellenbecker	Rep.	Wausau
30	Marinette		Charles A. Budlong	Rep.	Marinette
09	Milwaukee	1	Thomas H. Conway	Rep.	Milwaukee
09	Milwaukee	2	Michael Laffey	Rep.	Milwaukee
04	Milwaukee	3	Albert F. Woller	Soc.	Milwaukee
04	Milwaukee	4	Fred W. Springer	Rep.	Milwaukee
07	Milwaukee	5	Joseph Przybylski	Rep.	Milwaukee
06	Milwaukee	6	Frederick W. Cords Jr.	Rep.	Milwaukee
06	Milwaukee	7	Philip Wenz	Soc.	Milwaukee
03	Milwaukee	8	Mary O. Kryszak	Dem.	Milwaukee
06	Milwaukee	9	Otto Kehrein	Soc.	Milwaukee
08	Milwaukee	10	John W. Eber	Rep.	Milwaukee
03	Milwaukee	11	Alex Chmurski	Rep.	Milwaukee
05	Milwaukee	12	Harry G. Slater	Rep.	Milwaukee
04	Milwaukee	13	Ernst Pahl	Rep.	Milwaukee
07	Milwaukee	14	Alfred Buntin	Rep.	Milwaukee
05	Milwaukee	15	Theodore Engel	Rep.	Milwaukee
08	Milwaukee	16	Charles B. Perry	Rep.	Wauwatosa
07	Milwaukee	17	John W. Grobschmidt	Rep.	Lake
04	Milwaukee	18	Frank L. Prescott	Rep.	Whitefish Bay
08	Milwaukee	19	Eugene A. Phalen	Rep.	West Allis
05	Milwaukee	20	Norman R. Klug	Rep.	Milwaukee
31	Monroe		Earl D. Hall	Rep.	Greenfield
02	Oconto		Carl Schoenebeck	Rep.	Lena
14	Outagamie	1	Oscar J. Schmiege	Rep.	Appleton
14	Outagamie	2	John E. Rohan	Dem.	Kaukauna
20	Ozaukee		Louis G. Kieker	Dem.	Thiensville
10	Pierce		Charles E. Hanson	Rep.	River Falls
29	Polk		E. E. Husband	Rep.	Balsam Lake
23	Portage		Michael J. Mersch	Dem.	Stevens Point
12	Price		L. S. Shauger	Rep.	Ogema
21	Racine	1	Wallace Ingalls	Rep.	Racine
21	Racine	2	Edward F. Hilker	Rep.	Racine
21	Racine	3	John H. Kamper	Rep.	Raymond
27	Richland		Harley A. Martin	Ind.	Richland Center
15	Rock	1	Stanley Slagg	Rep.	Edgerton
15	Rock	2	Erastus G. Smith	Rep.	Beloit
12	Rusk & Sawyer		Jorge W. Carow	Rep.	Ladysmith
27	Sauk		Robert J. Keller	Rep.	Sauk City
14	Shawano		Paul T. Fuhrman	Rep.	Bowler
20	Sheboygan	1	Curt W. Janke	Rep.	Sheboygan
20	Sheboygan	2	John Mentink	Rep.	Cedar Grove
10	St. Croix		Lynn H. Ashley	Rep.	Hudson
24	Taylor		John Gamper	Rep.	Medford
32	Trempealeau		Thomas Hunter	Rep.	Galesville
16	Vernon		Dedrick M. Langve	Rep.	Westby
22	Walworth		Daniel E. LaBar	Rep.	Delavan
13	Washington		Joseph J. Huber	Rep.	West Bend
33	Waukesha	1	Evan G. Davies	Rep.	Wales
33	Waukesha	2	W. H. Edwards	Rep.	Sussex
23	Waupaca		Daniel F. Burnham	Rep.	Waupaca
19	Winnebago	1	William Meyer	Rep.	Oshkosh
19	Winnebago	2	Nels Larson	Rep.	Neenah
24	Wood		Peter Ebbe	Rep.	Marshfield

== Committees ==
=== Senate committees ===
- Senate Standing Committee on Agriculture and Labor – J. C. Schumann, chair
- Senate Standing Committee on Committees – E. J. Roethe, chair
- Senate Standing Committee on Contingent Expenditures – W. H. Markham, chair
- Senate Standing Committee on Corporations and Taxation – H. Daggett, chair
- Senate Standing Committee on Education and Public Welfare – W. S. Goodland, chair
- Senate Standing Committee on Highways – C. B. Casperson, chair
- Senate Standing Committee on the Judiciary – I. P. Mehigan, chair
- Senate Standing Committee on Legislative Procedure – O. Morris, chair
- Senate Standing Committee on State and Local Government – M. F. White, chair

=== Assembly committees ===
- Assembly Standing Committee on Agriculture – D. V. Smith, chair
- Assembly Standing Committee on Commerce and Manufactures – C. E. Hanson, chair
- Assembly Standing Committee on Conservation – L. L. Thayer, chair
- Assembly Standing Committee on Contingent Expenditures – J. C. Hanson, chair
- Assembly Standing Committee on Education – E. G. Smith, chair
- Assembly Standing Committee on Elections – C. A. Budlong, chair
- Assembly Standing Committee on Engrossed Bills – C. N. Saugen, chair
- Assembly Standing Committee on Enrolled Bills – J. W. Carow, chair
- Assembly Standing Committee on Excise and Fees – C. L. Lacy, chair
- Assembly Standing Committee on Highways – G. M. O'Connor, chair
- Assembly Standing Committee on Insurance and Banking – F. L. Prescott, chair
- Assembly Standing Committee on the Judiciary – A. C. Reis, chair
- Assembly Standing Committee on Labor – M. Laffey, chair
- Assembly Standing Committee on Municipalities – T. Engel, chair
- Assembly Standing Committee on Printing – E. E. Husband, chair
- Assembly Standing Committee on Public Welfare – H. E. Stephens, chair
- Assembly Standing Committee on Revision – F. E. Moul, chair
- Assembly Standing Committee on Rules – W. H. Edwards, chair
- Assembly Standing Committee on State Affairs – P. E. Nelson, chair
- Assembly Standing Committee on Taxation – W. H. Edwards, chair
- Assembly Standing Committee on Third Reading – L. D. Eastman, chair
- Assembly Standing Committee on Transportation – T. H. Conway, chair

=== Joint committees ===
- Joint Standing Committee on Finance – H. E. Boldt (Sen.) & E. F. Hilker (Asm.), co-chairs

== Employees ==
=== Senate employees ===
- Chief Clerk: Oliver Munson
  - Assistant Chief Clerk: R. A. Cobban
- Sergeant-at-Arms: George W. Rickeman
  - Assistant Sergeant-at-Arms: E. A. Hartman
- Postmaster: Joseph Kernler

=== Assembly employees ===
- Chief Clerk: C. E. Shaffer
  - Journal Clerk: Charles E. Tuffley
- Sergeant-at-Arms: Charles F. Moulton
  - Assistant Sergeant-at-Arms: Lincoln Neprud
- Postmaster: Arthur Dihring
