= 58th Wisconsin Legislature =

Wisconsin legislative term for 1927–1928

←	57th	59th	→
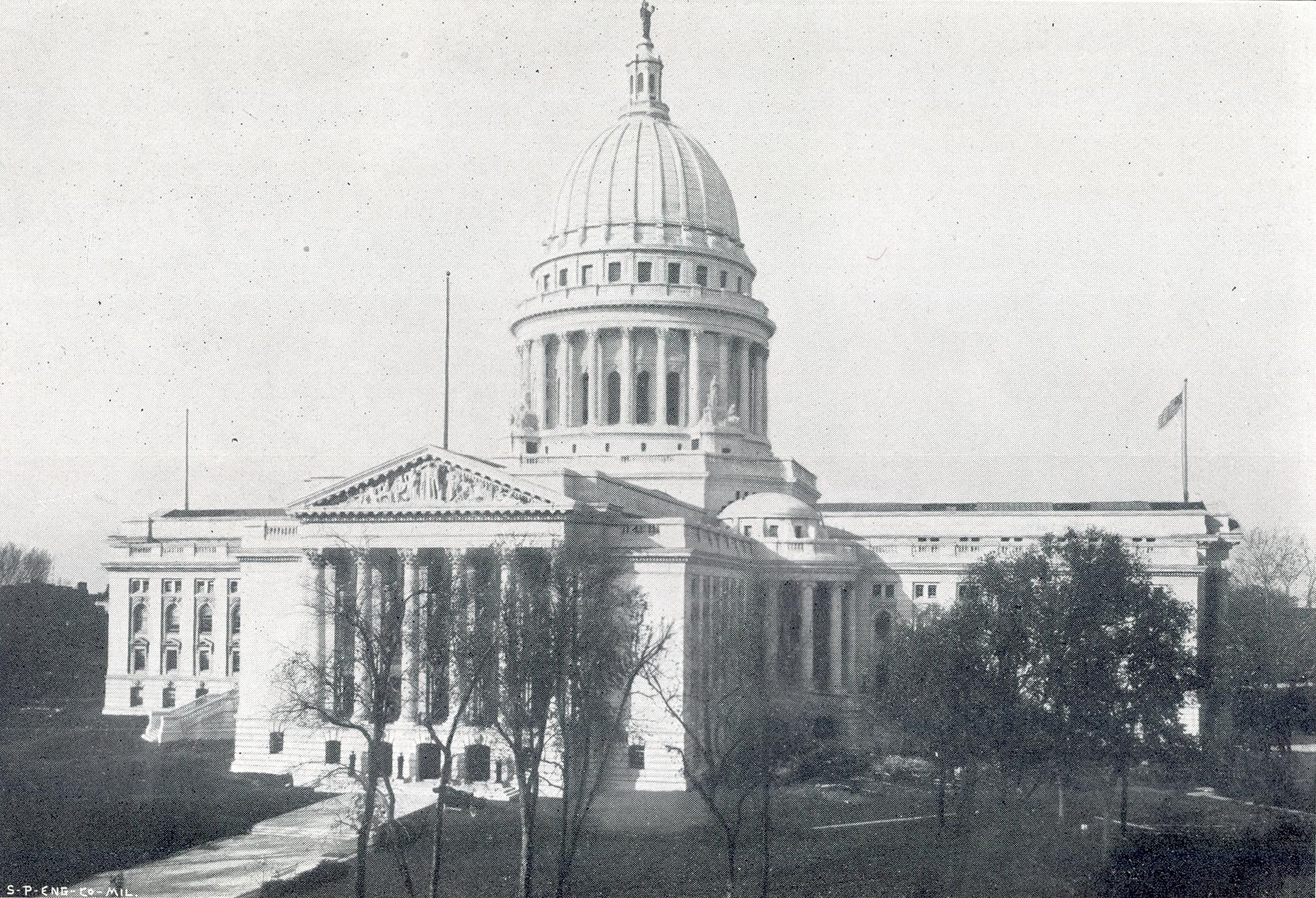
- Wisconsin State Capitol ca.1915

Overview
- Legislative body: Wisconsin Legislature
- Meeting place: Wisconsin State Capitol
- Term: January 3, 1927 – January 7, 1929
- Election: November 2, 1926

Senate
- Members: 33
- Senate President: Henry Huber (R)
- President pro tempore: William L. Smith (R)
- Party control: Republican

Assembly
- Members: 100
- Assembly Speaker: John W. Eber (R)
- Party control: Republican

Sessions
- Regular: January 12, 1927 – August 13, 1927

Special sessions
- Jan. 1928 Spec.: January 24, 1928 – February 4, 1928
- Mar. 1928 Spec.: March 6, 1928 – March 13, 1928

The Fifty-Eighth Wisconsin Legislature convened from January 12, 1927, to August 13, 1927, in regular session, and reconvened in two special sessions in 1928.

Senators representing odd-numbered districts were newly elected for this session and were serving the first two years of a four-year term. Assembly members were elected to a two-year term. Assembly members and odd-numbered senators were elected in the general election of November 2, 1926. Senators representing even-numbered districts were serving the third and fourth year of a four-year term, having been elected in the general election of November 4, 1924.

The governor of Wisconsin during this entire term was Republican Fred R. Zimmerman, of Milwaukee County, serving a two-year term, having won election in the 1926 Wisconsin gubernatorial election.

== Major events ==
- January 3, 1927: Inauguration of Fred R. Zimmerman as the 25th Governor of Wisconsin.
- January 7, 1927: The first transatlantic telephone call was made via radio from New York City, United States, to London, United Kingdom.
- January 24, 1927: United States marines invaded Nicaragua to bolster the conservative government forces against liberal rebels in the Nicaraguan Civil War.
- February 23, 1927: U.S. President Calvin Coolidge signed the Radio Act of 1927, creating the Federal Radio Commission.
- March 21, 1927: The Orpheum Theatre opened in Madison, Wisconsin.
- April 5, 1927: 1927 Wisconsin Spring general election:
  - Wisconsin voters rejected an amendment to the state constitution to increase legislator pay to $1,000 per session.
  - Wisconsin voters approved an amendment to the state constitution to adjust taxation of forest land.
- May 20–21, 1927: Charles Lindbergh completed the first solo, nonstop transatlantic flight—from New York to Paris—in his single-engine aircraft, the Spirit of St. Louis.
- July 2, 1927: The Oriental Theatre opened in Milwaukee, Wisconsin.
- August 2, 1927: U.S. President Calvin Coolidge announced he would not run for re-election in 1928.
- September 13, 1927: The Eagles Club opened in Milwaukee, Wisconsin.
- October 3, 1927: Farmers Mutual Insurance Company—which later became American Family Insurance—was founded in Madison, Wisconsin.
- June 29, 1928: Al Smith accepted the nomination of the Democratic Party for President of the United States, becoming the first Catholic presidential nominee of a major American political party.
- August 27, 1928: The Kellogg–Briand Pact was signed in Paris, becoming the first treaty renouncing the policy of aggressive war.
- September 4, 1928: Incumbent Wisconsin governor Fred R. Zimmerman lost renomination in the Republican primary.
- November 6, 1928: 1928 United States general election:
  - Herbert Hoover elected President of the United States.
  - Walter J. Kohler Sr. elected Governor of Wisconsin.
  - Robert La Follette Jr. re-elected United States senator from Wisconsin.

== Major legislation ==
- 1927 Joint Resolution 12: Joint Resolution to amend section 21 of article IV of the constitution, relating to compensation of members of the legislature and to submit this amendment to vote of the people at the April election of 1927. Second legislative passage of a proposed amendment to the state constitution to increase legislator pay to $1,000 per session. This amendment was defeated by voters in the April 1927 election.
- 1927 Joint Resolution 13: Joint Resolution to amend section 1 of article VIII of the constitution, relating to taxation of forests and minerals and of forest and mineral lands, and to submit this amendment to vote of the people at the April election of 1927. Second legislative passage of a proposed amendment to the state constitution to adjust taxation of forest land. This amendment was ratified by voters in the April 1927 election.
- 1927 Joint Resolution 18: Joint Resolution memorializing the Congress of the United States to provide for a nation-wide referendum on the question of modifying the Volstead act. Wisconsin made several appeals to amend the alcohol probition law in order to allow the manufacture and sale of beer.
- 1927 Joint Resolution 21: Joint Resolution to amend section 21 of article IV of the constitution, relating to compensation of members of the legislature. First legislative passage of a proposed amendment to the state constitution to allow legislator pay to be set by law rather than fixed by the constitution. This amendment would eventually be ratified by voters in the April 1929 election. This was the sixth attempt in 20 years to amend the constitution to update legislator compensation. The previous attempts were rejected by voters in elections in 1910, 1914, 1920, 1924, and 1927.
- 1927 Joint Resolution 24: Joint Resolution to amend section 4, Article VI, of the constitution, relating to the election of sheriffs. First legislative passage of a proposed amendment to the state constitution allow sheriffs to serve two consecutive terms. This amendment would eventually be ratified by voters at the April 1929 election.
- 1927 Joint Resolution 37: Joint Resolution to amend section 10 of article V of the constitution, relating to the approval of bills by the governor. First legislative passage of a proposed amendment to the state constitution to grant the Governor the power of a partial veto on appropriation bills. This amendment would eventually be ratified by voters at the November 1930 election.

== Party summary ==
=== Senate summary ===
Senate partisan composition Socialist: 2 seats Republican: 31 seats

	Party (Shading indicates majority caucus)			Total	
	Dem.	Soc.	Rep.	Total	Vacant
End of previous Legislature	0	3	30	33	0
Start of Reg. Session	0	2	31	33	0
Final voting share	6.06%		93.94%		
Beginning of the next Legislature	0	2	31	33	0

=== Assembly summary ===
Assembly partisan composition Democratic: 2 seats Socialist: 8 seats Independent: 1 seat Republican: 89 seats

	Party (Shading indicates majority caucus)				Total	
	Dem.	Soc.	Ind.	Rep.	Total	Vacant
End of previous Legislature	1	7	0	88	96	4
Start of Reg. Session	2	8	1	89	100	0
Final voting share	11%			89%		
Beginning of the next Legislature	5	3	1	91	100	0

== Sessions ==
- Regular session: January 12, 1927 – August 13, 1927
- January 1928 special session: January 24, 1928 – February 4, 1928
- March 1928 special session: March 6, 1928 – March 13, 1928

== Leaders ==
=== Senate leadership ===
- President of the Senate: Henry Huber (R)
- President pro tempore: William L. Smith (R–Neillsville)

=== Assembly leadership ===
- Speaker of the Assembly: John W. Eber (R–Milwaukee)

== Members ==
=== Members of the Senate ===
Members of the Senate for the Fifty-Eighth Wisconsin Legislature:

Senate partisan representation Socialist: 2 seats Republican: 31 seats

Dist.	Counties	Senator	Residence	Party
01	Door, Kewaunee, & Manitowoc	John E. Cashman	Denmark	Rep.
02	Brown & Oconto	John B. Chase	Oconto	Rep.
03	Milwaukee (South City)	Walter Polakowski	Milwaukee	Soc.
04	Milwaukee (Northeast County & Northeast City)	Oscar Morris	Milwaukee	Rep.
05	Milwaukee (Northwest City)	Bernhard Gettelman	Milwaukee	Rep.
06	Milwaukee (North-Central City)	Alex C. Ruffing	Milwaukee	Soc.
07	Milwaukee (Southeast County & Southeast City)	Herbert H. Smith	Milwaukee	Rep.
08	Milwaukee (Western County)	Harry Daggett	West Milwaukee	Rep.
09	Milwaukee (City Downtown)	Irving P. Mehigan	Milwaukee	Rep.
10	Buffalo, Pepin, Pierce, & St. Croix	Walter H. Hunt	River Falls	Rep.
11	Bayfield, Burnett, Douglas, & Washburn	R. Bruce Johnson	Superior	Rep.
12	Ashland, Iron, Price, Rusk, Sawyer, & Vilas	James H. Carroll	Glidden	Rep.
13	Dodge & Washington	William H. Markham	Horicon	Rep.
14	Outagamie & Shawano	John Englund	Wittenberg	Rep.
15	Rock	George W. Blanchard	Edgerton	Rep.
16	Crawford, Grant, & Vernon	Edward J. Roethe	Fennimore	Rep.
17	Green, Iowa, & Lafayette	Charles W. Hutchison	Mineral Point	Rep.
18	Fond du Lac, Green Lake & Waushara	William A. Titus	Fond du Lac	Rep.
19	Calumet & Winnebago	Merritt F. White	Winneconne	Rep.
20	Ozaukee & Sheboygan	Herman E. Boldt	Sheboygan Falls	Rep.
21	Racine	Walter S. Goodland	Racine	Rep.
22	Kenosha & Walworth	George W. Hull	Whitewater	Rep.
23	Portage & Waupaca	Herman J. Severson	Iola	Rep.
24	Clark, Taylor, & Wood	William L. Smith	Neillsville	Rep.
25	Lincoln & Marathon	Otto Mueller	Wausau	Rep.
26	Dane	Harry Sauthoff	Madison	Rep.
27	Columbia, Richland, & Sauk	Robert Caldwell	Lodi	Rep.
28	Chippewa & Eau Claire	Herman Lange	Eau Claire	Rep.
29	Barron, Dunn, & Polk	Carl B. Casperson	Frederic	Rep.
30	Florence, Forest, Langlade, Marinette, & Oneida	James A. Barker	Antigo	Rep.
31	Adams, Juneau, Monroe, & Marquette	Howard Teasdale	Sparta	Rep.
32	Jackson, La Crosse, & Trempealeau	V. S. Keppel	Holmen	Rep.
33	Jefferson & Waukesha	John C. Schumann	Watertown	Rep.

=== Members of the Assembly ===
Members of the Assembly for the Fifty-Eighth Wisconsin Legislature:

Assembly partisan composition Democratic: 2 seats Socialist: 8 seats Independent: 1 seat Republican: 89 seats

Milwaukee County districts

Senate Dist.	County	Dist.	Representative	Party	Residence
31	Adams & Marquette		Robert B. Wood	Rep.	Adams
12	Ashland		Bernard J. Gehrmann	Rep.	Mellen
29	Barron		Charles A. Beggs	Rep.	Rice Lake
11	Bayfield		Paul Ungrodt	Rep.	Washburn
02	Brown	1	Malcolm A. Sellers	Rep.	Green Bay
02	Brown	2	Gustav J. Zittlow	Rep.	West De Pere
10	Buffalo & Pepin		Arthur A. Hitt	Rep.	Alma
11	Burnett & Washburn		Louis Thayer	Rep.	Birchwood
19	Calumet		Carl Hillmann	Rep.	Brillion
28	Chippewa		Gustave Rheingans	Prog.Rep.	Chippewa Falls
24	Clark		Arlo Huckstead	Rep.	Neillsville
27	Columbia		E. Myrwyn Rowlands	Rep.	Cambria
16	Crawford		Archie J. McDowell	Rep.	Soldiers Grove
26	Dane	1	Alvin C. Reis	Rep.	Madison
26	Dane	2	James C. Hanson	Rep.	Deerfield
26	Dane	3	Albert J. Baker	Rep.	Mount Horeb
13	Dodge	1	John M. Dihring	Rep.	Brownsville
13	Dodge	2	Philip J. Zink	Dem.	Beaver Dam
01	Door		Bernard Hahn	Rep.	Gibraltar
11	Douglas	1	Walter W. Lang	Rep.	Superior
11	Douglas	2	Philip E. Nelson	Rep.	Maple
29	Dunn		James D. Millar	Rep.	Menomonie
28	Eau Claire		C. N. Saugen	Rep.	Pleasant Valley
30	Florence, Forest, & Oneida		Joseph D. Grandine	Rep.	Argonne
18	Fond du Lac	1	Math Koenigs	Rep.	Fond du Lac
18	Fond du Lac	2	Thomas Dieringer	Prog.Rep.	Campbellsport
16	Grant	1	Harry E. Stephens	Rep.	Platteville
16	Grant	2	Leroy D. Eastman	Rep.	Boscobel
17	Green		Ernst J. Hoesly	Prog.Rep.	New Glarus
18	Green Lake & Waushara		George M. O'Connor	Rep.	Hancock
17	Iowa		John S. Jackson	Rep.	Mineral Point
12	Iron & Vilas		Richard C. Trembath	Rep.	Hurley
32	Jackson		Emil G. Gilbertson	Rep.	Black River Falls
33	Jefferson		Don V. Smith	Rep.	Lake Mills
31	Juneau		A. A. Telfer	Rep.	Elroy
22	Kenosha	1	Conrad Shearer	Rep.	Kenosha
22	Kenosha	2	Don J. Vincent	Rep.	Genoa City
01	Kewaunee		Anton G. Schauer	Rep.	Kewaunee
32	La Crosse	1	Gardner R. Withrow	Rep.	La Crosse
32	La Crosse	2	John Larson	Rep.	West Salem
17	Lafayette		S. Dell Penniston	Rep.	Argyle
30	Langlade		John R. Fronek	Rep.	Antigo
25	Lincoln		Richard Kamke	Rep.	Merrill
01	Manitowoc	1	Charles Schuette	Rep.	Manitowoc
01	Manitowoc	2	Herman Roethel	Rep.	Kiel
25	Marathon	1	Mathias J. Berres	Rep.	Edgar
25	Marathon	2	Henry Ellenbecker	Rep.	Wausau
30	Marinette		Charles A. Budlong	Rep.	Marinette
09	Milwaukee	1	Thomas H. Conway	Rep.	Milwaukee
09	Milwaukee	2	Michael Laffey	Rep.	Milwaukee
04	Milwaukee	3	Albert F. Woller	Soc.	Milwaukee
04	Milwaukee	4	Thomas Duncan	Soc.	Milwaukee
07	Milwaukee	5	George L. Tews	Soc.	Milwaukee
06	Milwaukee	6	Frederick Petersen	Rep.	Milwaukee
06	Milwaukee	7	Philip Wenz	Soc.	Milwaukee
03	Milwaukee	8	Louis Polewczynski	Rep.	Milwaukee
06	Milwaukee	9	Julius Kiesner	Soc.	Milwaukee
08	Milwaukee	10	John W. Eber	Rep.	Milwaukee
03	Milwaukee	11	Elmer Baumann	Soc.	Milwaukee
05	Milwaukee	12	Henry A. Staab	Rep.	Milwaukee
04	Milwaukee	13	Barney F. Spott	Rep.	Milwaukee
07	Milwaukee	14	George Gauer	Soc.	Milwaukee
05	Milwaukee	15	Theodore Engel	Rep.	Milwaukee
08	Milwaukee	16	Arthur J. Miller	Rep.	Wauwatosa
07	Milwaukee	17	Clarence C. Krause	Rep.	Lake
04	Milwaukee	18	Frank L. Prescott	Rep.	Whitefish Bay
08	Milwaukee	19	George C. Hinkley	Rep.	West Allis
05	Milwaukee	20	William Coleman	Soc.	Milwaukee
31	Monroe		Earl D. Hall	Rep.	Greenfield
02	Oconto		Carl Schoenebeck	Rep.	Lena
14	Outagamie	1	Oscar J. Schmiege	Rep.	Appleton
14	Outagamie	2	Anton M. Miller	Rep.	Kaukauna
20	Ozaukee		John J. Jungers	Rep.	Grafton
10	Pierce		Theodore Swanson	Rep.	Ellsworth
29	Polk		E. E. Husband	Rep.	Balsam Lake
23	Portage		Michael J. Mersch	Dem.	Stevens Point
12	Price		Helen F. Thompson	Rep.	Park Falls
21	Racine	1	Wallace Ingalls	Rep.	Racine
21	Racine	2	Edward F. Hilker	Rep.	Racine
21	Racine	3	John H. Kamper	Rep.	Raymond
27	Richland		Harley A. Martin	Ind.	Richland Center
15	Rock	1	John S. Baker	Rep.	Evansville
15	Rock	2	Erastus G. Smith	Rep.	Beloit
12	Rusk & Sawyer		A. C. Schultz	Rep.	Bruce
27	Sauk		Carl Koenig	Rep.	Loganville
14	Shawano		Paul T. Fuhrman	Rep.	Bowler
20	Sheboygan	1	Ernst A. Sonnemann	Rep.	Sheboygan
20	Sheboygan	2	John Mentink	Rep.	Cedar Grove
10	St. Croix		Robert M. Graham	Rep.	Roberts
24	Taylor		John Gamper	Rep.	Medford
32	Trempealeau		George Schmidt	Rep.	Arcadia
16	Vernon		August E. Smith	Rep.	Viroqua
22	Walworth		Frank E. Lawson	Rep.	Walworth
13	Washington		Joseph J. Huber	Rep.	West Bend
33	Waukesha	1	Evan G. Davies	Rep.	Wales
33	Waukesha	2	W. H. Edwards	Rep.	Sussex
23	Waupaca		Adam A. Schider	Rep.	Manawa
19	Winnebago	1	Chester D. Seftenberg	Rep.	Oshkosh
19	Winnebago	2	Nels Larson	Rep.	Neenah
24	Wood		Peter Ebbe	Rep.	Marshfield

== Committees ==
=== Senate committees ===
- Senate Standing Committee on Agriculture and Labor – G. W. Hull, chair
- Senate Standing Committee on Committees – H. Daggett, chair
- Senate Standing Committee on Contingent Expenditures – H. E. Boldt, chair
- Senate Standing Committee on Corporations and Taxation – H. T. Lange, chair
- Senate Standing Committee on Education and Public Welfare – W. A. Titus, chair
- Senate Standing Committee on Highways – C. B. Casperson, chair
- Senate Standing Committee on the Judiciary – I. P. Mehigan, chair
- Senate Standing Committee on State and Local Government – M. F. White, chair

=== Assembly committees ===
- Assembly Standing Committee on Agriculture – J. C. Hanson, chair
- Assembly Standing Committee on Commerce and Manufactures – F. J. Petersen, chair
- Assembly Standing Committee on Contingent Expenditures – A. A. Huckstead, chair
- Assembly Standing Committee on Education – J. D. Millar, chair
- Assembly Standing Committee on Elections – J. Gamper, chair
- Assembly Standing Committee on Engrossed Bills – H. F. Thompson, chair
- Assembly Standing Committee on Enrolled Bills – T. Swanson, chair
- Assembly Standing Committee on Excise and Fees – M. Koenigs, chair
- Assembly Standing Committee on Fish and Game – R. Kamke, chair
- Assembly Standing Committee on Highways – C. N. Saugen, chair
- Assembly Standing Committee on Insurance and Banking – M. Laffey, chair
- Assembly Standing Committee on the Judiciary – A. C. Reis, chair
- Assembly Standing Committee on Labor – A. M. Miller, chair
- Assembly Standing Committee on Municipalities – F. L. Prescott, chair
- Assembly Standing Committee on Printing – G. Zittlow, chair
- Assembly Standing Committee on Public Welfare – H. A. Staab, chair
- Assembly Standing Committee on Revision – C. Hillman, chair
- Assembly Standing Committee on Rules – A. C. Reis, chair
- Assembly Standing Committee on State Affairs – J. H. Kamper, chair
- Assembly Standing Committee on Taxation – G. W. Schmidt, chair
- Assembly Standing Committee on Third Reading – M. A. Sellers, chair
- Assembly Standing Committee on Transportation – E. D. Hall, chair

=== Joint committees ===
- Joint Standing Committee on Finance – W. L. Smith (Sen.) & H. Ellenbecker (Asm.), co-chairs

== Employees ==
=== Senate employees ===
- Chief Clerk: Oliver Munson
  - Assistant Chief Clerk: A. J. Nelson
- Sergeant-at-Arms: George W. Rickeman
  - Assistant Sergeant-at-Arms: E. A. Hartman
- Postmaster: Arthur Dehring

=== Assembly employees ===
- Chief Clerk: C. E. Shaffer
  - Journal Clerk: Max H. Albertz
- Sergeant-at-Arms: Charles F. Moulton
  - Assistant Sergeant-at-Arms: Lincoln Neprud
- Postmaster: William Kasiska
