= Wisconsin Legislature Joint Committee on Finance =

Standing committee of the Wisconsin Legislature

Joint Committee on Finance
- Wisconsin Legislature

Type
- Type: Statutory standing committee
- Term limits: None

History
- Established: March 2, 1911; 115 years ago 1911 Wis. Act 6
- Preceded by: Joint Committee on Claims (1857–1911)

Leadership
- Senate Co-Chair: Howard Marklein (R)
- Assembly Co-Chair: Mark Born (R)

Structure
- Seats: 16 members
- Senate seats: 6 Republican, 2 Democratic
- Assembly seats: 6 Republican, 2 Democratic

Website
- Website

The Joint Committee on Finance or Joint Finance Committee (JFC) is a powerful joint committee of the Wisconsin Legislature, responsible for overseeing all legislation dealing with state income or spending in the U.S. state of Wisconsin. It also controls final approval of many state payments and assessments, even after legislation has become law. Because of its prominent role in state finances, the committee is one of the most coveted assignments for Wisconsin legislators, and its members are heavily courted by interest groups and lobbyists.

== Background and history ==
The predecessor to the Joint Committee on Finance, the Joint Committee on Claims, was almost as old as the state of Wisconsin, being established by 1857 Wisconsin Act 59, enacted during the 10th Wisconsin Legislature. The committee on claims was empowered to consider "all bills or accounts requiring the appropriation of money by the Legislature."

The Joint Committee on Finance was a product of the progressive era of Wisconsin politics. The impetus for the new organization was the perception that state finances had become a sprawling mess of thousands of different appropriations scattered through dozens of different pieces of legislation and overseen by multiple different committees. This sprawl made it difficult for the Legislature to understand or enforce specific revenue targets for any given institution.

At the start of the 50th Wisconsin Legislature, in January 1911, Senate Bill 8 was introduced, proposing the expansion of the eight-member Joint Committee on Claims into a 14-member Joint Committee on Finance. The law passed without opposition and was signed by Governor Francis E. McGovern on March 2, 1911, as 1911 Wisconsin Act 6. The new joint committee had vastly expanded power; all bills containing appropriations, providing for revenue, or relating to taxation would have to receive the committee's approval. The expansive power of the committee, overseeing both expenditure and revenue, remains unique among U.S. state governments.

The committee began to organize in February 1911, and had their first meeting on February 28, 1911, in room 203–North of the Wisconsin State Capitol. Even before their first meeting, the Legislature passed 1911 Wisconsin Act 1, which authorized the Joint Finance Committee to employ experts in accounting and statistics in the formulation of public financial statements. 1911 Act 1 was replicated in each successive term, with legislation specifically authorizing the committee to hire a clerk and necessary expert staff.

== Current membership ==
| Majority | Minority |
|---|---|
| Sen. Howard Marklein, co-chair (Spring Green); Rep. Mark Born, co-chair (Beaver Dam); Sen. Patrick Testin, vice chair (Stevens Point); Rep. Tony Kurtz, vice chair (Wonewoc); Sen. Eric Wimberger (Oconto); Sen. Rob Stafsholt (New Richmond); Sen. Julian Bradley (New Berlin); Sen. Romaine Quinn (Birchwood); Rep. Shannon Zimmerman (River Falls); Rep. Jessie Rodriguez (Oak Creek); Rep. Alex Dallman (Markesan); Rep. Karen Hurd (Withee) | Sen. La Tonya Johnson (Milwaukee); Sen. Kelda Roys (Madison); Rep. Tip McGuire (Kenosha); Rep. Deb Andraca (Whitefish Bay) |

== Historical co-chairs ==
| Senate Co-Chair | | | Term | Assembly Co-Chair | | | Notes |
| Senator | Residence | Party | Term | Representative | Residence | Party | Notes |
|---|---|---|---|---|---|---|---|
| Albert W. Sanborn | Ashland, Ashland Co. | Rep. | 1911–1912 | Ray J. Nye | Superior, Douglas Co. | Rep. | |
| George E. Scott (died Nov. 9, 1915) | Prairie Farm, Barron Co. | Rep. | 1913–1914 | Ray J. Nye | Superior, Douglas Co. | Rep. | |
| George E. Scott (died Nov. 9, 1915) | Prairie Farm, Barron Co. | Rep. | 1915–1916 | F. W. Kubasta | Merrill, Lincoln Co. | Rep. | |
| Platt Whitman | Highland, Iowa Co. | Rep. | 1917–1918 | Edward A. Everett (res. July 1, 1917) | Eagle River, Vilas Co. | Rep. | |
| A. H. Wilkinson | Bayfield, Bayfield Co. | Rep. | 1919–1920 | Carl Kurtenacker | La Crosse, La Crosse Co. | Rep. | |
| Ray J. Nye | Superior, Douglas Co. | Rep. | 1921–1922 | George Oakes | New Richmond, St. Croix Co. | Rep. | |
| Henry Huber | Stoughton, Dane Co. | Rep. | 1923–1924 | Charles E. Tuffley | Boscobel, Grant Co. | Rep. | |
| George Staudenmayer | Portage, Columbia Co. | Rep. | 1925–1926 | George A. Nelson | Milltown, Polk Co. | Rep. | |
| William Lyman Smith | Neillsville, Clark Co. | Rep. | 1927–1928 | Henry Ellenbecker | Wausau, Marathon Co. | Rep. | |
| Herman E. Boldt | Sheboygan Falls, Sheboygan Co. | Rep. | 1929–1930 | Edward F. Hilker | Racine, Racine Co. | Rep. | |
| Thomas M. Duncan | Milwaukee, Milwaukee Co. | Soc. | 1931–1932 | Charles A. Beggs | Rice Lake, Barron Co. | Rep. | |
| Otto Mueller | Wausau, Marathon Co. | Rep. | 1933–1934 | Joseph C. Hamata | Racine, Racine Co. | Dem. | |
| E. F. Brunette | Green Bay, Brown Co. | Dem. | 1935–1936 | Charles A. Beggs | Rice Lake, Barron Co. | Prog. | |
| Edwin Myrwyn Rowlands | Cambria, Columbia Co. | Prog. | 1937–1938 | Ernst J. Hoesly | New Glarus, Green Co. | Prog. | |
| Otto Mueller | Wausau, Marathon Co. | Rep. | 1939–1940 | P. Bradley McIntyre | Lancaster, Grant Co. | Rep. | |
| Otto Mueller | Wausau, Marathon Co. | Rep. | 1941–1942 | P. Bradley McIntyre | Lancaster, Grant Co. | Rep. | |
| Helmar Lewis | Boscobel, Grant Co. | Rep. | 1943–1944 | P. Bradley McIntyre | Lancaster, Grant Co. | Rep. | |
| George H. Hipke | Stanley, Chippewa Co. | Rep. | 1945–1946 | Julius Spearbraker | Clintonville, Waupaca Co. | Rep. | |
| George H. Hipke | Stanley, Chippewa Co. | Rep. | 1947–1948 | Julius Spearbraker | Clintonville, Waupaca Co. | Rep. | |
| Foster B. Porter | Bloomington, Grant Co. | Rep. | 1949–1950 | Alfred R. Ludvigsen | Hartland, Waukesha Co. | Rep. | |
| Foster B. Porter | Bloomington, Grant Co. | Rep. | 1951–1952 | Alfred R. Ludvigsen | Hartland, Waukesha Co. | Rep. | |
| Arthur Lenroot Jr. | Superior, Douglas Co. | Rep. | 1953–1954 | Alfred R. Ludvigsen | Hartland, Waukesha Co. | Rep. | |
| Foster B. Porter | Bloomington, Grant Co. | Rep. | 1955–1956 | Alfred R. Ludvigsen | Hartland, Waukesha Co. | Rep. | |
| Alfred A. Laun Jr. | Kiel, Manitowoc Co. | Rep. | 1957–1958 | J. Riley Stone | Reedsburg, Sauk Co. | Rep. | |
| William Draheim | Neenah, Winnebago Co. | Rep. | 1959–1960 | Fred Risser | Madison, Dane Co. | Dem. | |
| William Draheim | Neenah, Winnebago Co. | Rep. | 1961–1962 | Everett Bidwell | Portage, Columbia Co. | Rep. | |
| Walter G. Hollander | Rosendale, Fond du Lac Co. | Rep. | 1963–1964 | Glen Pommerening | Wauwatosa, Milwaukee Co. | Rep. | |
| Walter G. Hollander | Rosendale, Fond du Lac Co. | Rep. | 1965–1966 | George Molinaro | Kenosha, Kenosha Co. | Dem. | |
| Walter G. Hollander | Rosendale, Fond du Lac Co. | Rep. | 1967–1968 | Byron F. Wackett | Watertown, Jefferson Co. | Rep. | |
| Walter G. Hollander | Rosendale, Fond du Lac Co. | Rep. | 1969–1970 | Byron F. Wackett | Watertown, Jefferson Co. | Rep. | |
| Walter G. Hollander | Rosendale, Fond du Lac Co. | Rep. | 1971–1972 | George Molinaro | Kenosha, Kenosha Co. | Dem. | |
| Walter G. Hollander | Rosendale, Fond du Lac Co. | Rep. | 1973–1974 | Dennis Conta | Milwaukee, Milwaukee Co. | Dem. | |
| Henry Dorman | Racine, Racine Co. | Dem. | 1975–1976 | Dennis Conta | Milwaukee, Milwaukee Co. | Dem. | |
| Henry Dorman | Racine, Racine Co. | Dem. | 1977–1978 | Gary K. Johnson | Beloit, Rock Co. | Dem. | |
| Jerry Kleczka | Milwaukee, Milwaukee Co. | Dem. | 1979–1980 | Gary K. Johnson | Beloit, Rock Co. | Dem. | |
| Jerry Kleczka | Milwaukee, Milwaukee Co. | Dem. | 1981–1982 | John Norquist | Milwaukee, Milwaukee Co. | Dem. | |
| Jerry Kleczka | Milwaukee, Milwaukee Co. | Dem. | 1983–1984 | Mary Lou Munts | Madison, Dane Co. | Dem. | |
| Gary George | Milwaukee, Milwaukee Co. | Dem. | 1985–1986 | Marlin Schneider | Wisconsin Rapids, Wood Co. | Dem. | |
| Gary George | Milwaukee, Milwaukee Co. | Dem. | 1987–1988 | Marlin Schneider | Wisconsin Rapids, Wood Co. | Dem. | |
| Gary George | Milwaukee, Milwaukee Co. | Dem. | 1989–1990 | Walter Kunicki | Milwaukee, Milwaukee Co. | Dem. | |
| Gary George | Milwaukee, Milwaukee Co. | Dem. | 1991–1992 | Barbara Linton | Ashland, Ashland Co. | Dem. | |
| Gary George | Milwaukee, Milwaukee Co. | Dem. | 1993–1994 | Barbara Linton | Ashland, Ashland Co. | Dem. | |
| Joseph Leean (Apr. 20, 1993 – Jul. 5, 1995) | Dayton, Waupaca Co. | Rep. | 1993–1994 | Barbara Linton | Ashland, Ashland Co. | Dem. | |
| Joseph Leean (Apr. 20, 1993 – Jul. 5, 1995) | Dayton, Waupaca Co. | Rep. | 1995–1996 | Ben Brancel | Douglas, Marquette Co. | Rep. | |
| Timothy Weeden | Beloit, Rock Co. | Rep. | 1995–1996 | Ben Brancel | Douglas, Marquette Co. | Rep. | |
| Brian Burke (until Apr. 21, 1998) | Milwaukee, Milwaukee Co. | Dem. | 1997–1998 | Scott R. Jensen (until Nov. 5, 1997) | Waukesha, Waukesha Co. | Rep. | |
| Brian Burke (until Apr. 21, 1998) | Milwaukee, Milwaukee Co. | Dem. | 1997–1998 | John Gard | Peshtigo, Marinette Co. | Rep. | |
| Timothy Weeden | Beloit, Rock Co. | Rep. | 1997–1998 | John Gard | Peshtigo, Marinette Co. | Rep. | |
| Brian Burke | Milwaukee, Milwaukee Co. | Dem. | 1999–2000 | John Gard | Peshtigo, Marinette Co. | Rep. | |
| Brian Burke | Milwaukee, Milwaukee Co. | Dem. | 2001–2002 | John Gard | Peshtigo, Marinette Co. | Rep. | |
| Alberta Darling | River Hills, Milwaukee Co. | Rep. | 2003–2004 | Dean Kaufert | Neenah, Winnebago Co. | Rep. | |
| Scott L. Fitzgerald | Clyman, Dodge Co. | Rep. | 2005–2006 | Dean Kaufert | Neenah, Winnebago Co. | Rep. | |
| Russ Decker (until Oct. 24, 2007) | Weston, Marathon Co. | Dem. | 2007–2008 | Kitty Rhoades | Hudson, St. Croix Co. | Rep. | |
| Mark F. Miller | Monona, Dane Co. | Dem. | 2007–2008 | Kitty Rhoades | Hudson, St. Croix Co. | Rep. | |
| Mark F. Miller | Monona, Dane Co. | Dem. | 2009–2010 | Mark Pocan | Madison, Dane Co. | Dem. | |
| Alberta Darling (until July 17, 2012) | River Hills, Milwaukee Co. | Rep. | 2011–2012 | Robin Vos | Burlington, Racine Co. | Rep. | |
| Lena Taylor | Milwaukee, Milwaukee Co. | Dem. | 2011–2012 | Robin Vos | Burlington, Racine Co. | Rep. | |
| Alberta Darling | River Hills, Milwaukee Co. | Rep. | 2013–2014 | John Nygren | Marinette, Marinette Co. | Rep. | |
| Alberta Darling | River Hills, Milwaukee Co. | Rep. | 2015–2016 | John Nygren | Marinette, Marinette Co. | Rep. | |
| Alberta Darling | River Hills, Milwaukee Co. | Rep. | 2017–2018 | John Nygren | Marinette, Marinette Co. | Rep. | |
| Alberta Darling | River Hills, Milwaukee Co. | Rep. | 2019–2020 | John Nygren | Marinette, Marinette Co. | Rep. | |
| Howard Marklein | Spring Green, Sauk Co. | Rep. | 2021–2022 | Mark Born | Beaver Dam, Dodge Co. | Rep. | |
| Howard Marklein | Spring Green, Sauk Co. | Rep. | 2023–2024 | Mark Born | Beaver Dam, Dodge Co. | Rep. | |
| Howard Marklein | Spring Green, Sauk Co. | Rep. | 2025–2026 | Mark Born | Beaver Dam, Dodge Co. | Rep. | |

== See also ==
- Wisconsin Legislature
