= Senator Smith =

Senator Smith may refer to:

== Fictional characters ==
- Jefferson Smith, a character in the 1939 comedy-drama film Mr. Smith Goes to Washington
- Senator Smith, a character in the 1941 western film They Died with Their Boots On
- Lafe Smith, a character in the 1962 drama film Advise & Consent
- Senator Smith, a character in the 2003 television show Mister Sterling

== Members of the Australian Senate ==
- David Smith (Australian Capital Territory politician) (born 1970), Australian senator from the Australian Capital Territory from 2018 to 2019
- Dean Smith (Australian politician) (born 1969), Australian senator from Western Australia since 2012
- Marielle Smith (born 1986), Australian senator from South Australia since 2019
- Staniforth Smith (1869–1934), Australian senator from Western Australia from 1901 to 1906

== Members of the Canadian Senate ==
- Benjamin Franklin Smith (1865–1944), Canadian senator from New Brunswick from 1935 to 1944
- David Smith (Canadian senator) (1941–2020), Canadian senator from Cobourg, Ontario from 2002 to 2016
- Donald Smith (politician) (1905–1985), Canadian senator from Queens—Shelburne from 1955 to 1980
- E. D. Smith (1853–1948), Canadian senator from Wentworth, Ontario from 1913 to 1946
- Frank Smith (Canadian politician) (1822–1901), Canadian senator from Toronto, Ontario from 1871 to 1900
- George Isaac Smith (1909–1982), Canadian senator from Colchester, Nova Scotia from 1975 to 1982
- Larry Smith (Canadian politician) (born 1951), Canadian senator from Saurel, Quebec since 2011
- Sydney John Smith (1892–1976), Canadian senator from British Columbia from 1957 to 1968

== Members of the Irish Senate ==
- Matthew Smith (Irish politician) (died 1955), Irish senator from 1954 to 1955
- Michael Smith (Irish politician) (born 1940), Irish senator in 1982 and from 1983 to 1987

== Members of the Liberian Senate ==
- James Skivring Smith (1825–1892), Liberian senator from 1855 to 1863 and from 1868 to 1869

== Members of the United States Senate ==
- Benjamin A. Smith II (1916–1991), U.S. senator from Massachusetts from 1960 to 1962
- Bob Smith (New Hampshire politician) (born 1941), U.S. senator from New Hampshire from 1990 to 2003
- Daniel Smith (surveyor) (1748–1818), U.S. senator from Tennessee from 1798 to 1799 and from 1805 to 1809
- Delazon Smith (1816–1860), U.S. senator from Oregon in 1859
- Ellison D. Smith (1864–1944), U.S. senator from South Carolina from 1909 to 1944
- Gordon H. Smith (born 1952), U.S. senator from Oregon from 1997 to 2009
- Howard Alexander Smith (1880–1966), U.S. senator from New Jersey from 1944 to 1959
- Israel Smith (1759–1810), U.S. senator from Vermont from 1803 to 1807
- James Smith Jr. (1851–1927), U.S. senator from New Jersey from 1893 to 1899
- John Smith (New York politician, born 1752) (1752–1816), U.S. senator from New York from 1804 to 1813
- John Smith (Ohio politician, died 1824) (1735–1824), U.S. senator from Ohio from 1803 to 1808
- John Walter Smith (1845–1925), U.S. senator from Maryland from 1908 to 1921
- M. Hoke Smith (1855–1931), U.S. senator from Georgia from 1911 to 1921
- Marcus A. Smith (1851–1924), U.S. senator from Arizona from 1912 to 1921
- Margaret Chase Smith (1897–1995), U.S. senator from Maine from 1949 to 1973
- Nathan Smith (politician) (1770–1835), U.S. senator from Connecticut from 1833 to 1835
- Oliver H. Smith (1794–1859), U.S. senator from Indiana from 1837 to 1843
- Perry Smith (politician) (1783–1852), U.S. senator from Connecticut from 1837 to 1843
- Ralph Tyler Smith (1915–1972), U.S. senator from Illinois from 1969 to 1970
- Samuel Smith (Maryland politician) (1752–1839), U.S. senator from Maryland from 1803 to 1815 and from 1822 to 1833
- Tina Smith (born 1958), U.S. senator from Minnesota since 2018
- Truman Smith (1791–1884), U.S. senator from Connecticut from 1849 to 1854
- William Alden Smith (1859–1932), U.S. senator from Michigan from 1907 to 1919
- William Smith (South Carolina politician, born 1762) (1762–1840), U.S. senator from South Carolina from 1816 to 1823 and from 1826 to 1831
- Willis Smith (1887–1953), U.S. senator from North Carolina from 1950 to 1953

== United States state senate members ==
=== Alabama State Senate ===
- Addison Gillespie Smith (1851–1933)
- Harri Anne Smith (born 1962)
- Robert Hardy Smith (1813–1878)

=== Arizona State Senate ===
- Claude Smith (politician) (1891–1931)
- J. Hubert Smith (1887–1978)
- Steve Smith (Arizona politician) (fl. 2010s)
- Tom Smith (Arizona politician) (1927–2014)

=== Arkansas State Senate ===
- Frank G. Smith (1872–1950)

=== California State Senate ===
- Sylvester C. Smith (1858–1913)

=== Connecticut State Senate ===
- Asa Smith (politician) (1829–1907)
- Regina R. Smith (1937–2005)
- Wilber G. Smith (1935–1992)
- Winthrop Smith (politician) (fl. 1990s–2010s)

=== Florida State Senate ===
- Carlos Smith (politician) (born 1980)
- Chris Smith (Florida politician) (born 1970)
- Rod Smith (politician) (born 1949)

=== Georgia State Senate ===
- James Monroe Smith (Georgia planter) (1839–1915)
- Preston Smith (Georgia state politician) (fl. 2000s–2010s)
- William Ephraim Smith (1829–1890)

=== Illinois State Senate ===
- Edward O. Smith (1817–1892)
- Elbert S. Smith (1911–1983)
- Frank L. Smith (1867–1950)
- Fred J. Smith (1899–1988)
- Ora Smith (1884–1965)
- Ralph Tyler Smith (1915–1972)
- Theophilus W. Smith (1784–1846)
- Thomas Vernor Smith (1890–1964)

=== Indiana State Senate ===
- Alonzo G. Smith (1848–1907)
- Jim Smith (Indiana politician) (fl. 2010s)
- Marcus C. Smith (1825–1900)
- Samuel Smith Jr. (fl. 1990s–2000s)
- Thomas Smith (Indiana politician) (1799–1876)

=== Iowa State Senate ===
- Clermont Colfax Smith (1868–1939)
- Edward McMurray Smith (1870–1953)
- Hiram Y. Smith (1843–1894)
- Jackie Smith (politician) (born 1955)
- Marvin W. Smith (1901–1982)
- Roby Smith (born 1969)
- Thomas Henry Smith (American politician) (1854–1936)

=== Kansas State Senate ===
- Frank Smith (Kansas politician) (born 1952)
- Glee S. Smith Jr. (1921–2015)
- Greg Smith (Kansas politician) (born 1959)

=== Kentucky State Senate ===
- Brandon Smith (politician) (born 1967)
- David Highbaugh Smith (1854–1928)
- John Speed Smith (1792–1854)
- Tom Smith (politician, born 1938) (born 1938)

=== Louisiana State Senate ===
- Gary Smith Jr. (born 1972)
- John R. Smith (politician, born 1945)

=== Maine State Senate ===
- Clyde H. Smith (1876–1940)
- Douglas Smith (Maine politician) (born 1946)
- Francis Ormand Jonathan Smith (1806–1876)

=== Maryland State Senate ===
- Robert Smith (Maryland politician) (1757–1842)
- Thomas Alexander Smith (1850–1932)
- William C. Smith Jr. (born 1982)
- William Smith (Maryland politician) (1728–1814)

=== Massachusetts State Senate ===
- George Edwin Smith (1849–1919)
- Josiah Smith (1738–1803)

=== Michigan State Senate ===
- George A. Smith (Michigan politician) (1825–1893)
- John W. Smith (Detroit mayor) (1882–1942)
- Nick Smith (American politician) (born 1934)
- Samuel W. Smith (1852–1931)
- Virgil C. Smith (1947–2025)
- Virgil Smith Jr. (born 1979)

=== Minnesota State Senate ===
- Edward Everett Smith (1861–1931)

=== Mississippi State Senate ===
- Frank Ellis Smith (1918–1997)
- Fred B. Smith (1892–1984)
- George C. Smith (Mississippi politician) (fl. 1870s)
- Marion Smith (born 1932)
- Martin T. Smith (1934–2015), Mississippi State Senate
- Murray F. Smith (1850–1909)
- Tony Smith (Mississippi politician) (born 1962)

=== Missouri State Senate ===
- Francis Smith (Missouri politician) (1905–1984)
- Jeff Smith (Missouri politician) (born 1973)
- Madison R. Smith (1850–1919)
- Randle Jasper Smith (1908–1962)

=== Montana State Senate ===
- Cary Smith (politician) (born 1950)
- Frank Smith (Montana politician) (born 1942)
- Laura Smith (American politician) (fl. 2020s)

=== Nebraska State Senate ===
- Adrian Smith (politician) (born 1970)
- Alva Smith (1850–1924)
- Jacklyn Smith (1934–2021)
- Jim Smith (Nebraska politician) (born 1959)

=== Nevada State Senate ===
- Debbie Smith (Nevada politician) (1956–2016)

=== New Hampshire State Senate ===
- Jedediah K. Smith (1770–1828)

=== New Jersey State Senate ===
- Bob Smith (New Jersey politician) (born 1947)
- Bradford S. Smith (born 1950)
- Hezekiah B. Smith (1816–1887)
- L. Harvey Smith (born 1948)
- Walter L. Smith Jr. (1917–1994)

=== New Mexico State Senate ===
- John Arthur Smith (1942–2024)

=== New York State Senate ===
- Ada L. Smith (born 1945)
- Bernard C. Smith (1923–1999)
- C. Ernest Smith (1894–1970)
- Jesse C. Smith (1808–1888)
- John E. Smith (New York politician) (1843–1907)
- John Smith (New York politician, born 1752) (1752–1816)
- Joshua B. Smith (1801–1860)
- Joshua Smith (New York politician) (1763–1845)
- Justin A. Smith (1818–1879)
- Malcolm Smith (American politician) (born 1956)
- Sanford W. Smith (1869–1929)
- Saxton Smith (1802–1890)
- William T. Smith (1916–2010)
- William Smith (New York state senator) (1720–1799)

=== North Carolina State Senate ===
- Benjamin Smith (North Carolina politician) (1756–1826)
- Erica D. Smith (born 1969)
- Fred Smith (North Carolina politician) (born 1942)
- Kandie Smith (born 1969)
- McNeill Smith (1918–2011)
- William Alexander Smith (politician) (1828–1888)
- William N. H. Smith (1812–1889)

=== Ohio State Senate ===
- John Quincy Smith (1824–1901)
- Kent Smith (American politician) (born 1966)
- Shirley Smith (politician) (born 1950)

=== Oklahoma State Senate ===
- Jerry L. Smith (1943–2015)

=== Oregon State Senate ===
- David Brock Smith (born 1976/77)
- Elmo Smith (1909–1968)
- William Smith (Oregon politician) (fl. 1890s–1900s)

=== Pennsylvania State Senate ===
- A. Herr Smith (1815–1894)
- Joseph F. Smith (Pennsylvania politician) (1920–1999)
- Samuel A. Smith (1795–1861)
- William Rudolph Smith (1787–1868)

=== Rhode Island State Senate ===
- Henry Smith (Rhode Island governor) (1766–1818)

=== South Carolina State Senate ===
- J. Verne Smith (1925–2006)
- Nell Whitley Smith (1929–2011)
- O'Brien Smith (1756–1811)
- William Smith (South Carolina politician, born 1751) (1751–1837)

=== South Dakota State Senate ===
- Darius S. Smith (1833–1913)
- Eldon L. Smith (1928–1972)
- Jamie Smith (politician) (born 1971)
- V. J. Smith (fl. 2010s–2020s)

=== Texas State Senate ===
- John Lee Smith (1894–1963)
- Preston Smith (governor) (1912–2003)

=== Vermont State Senate ===
- Charles Manley Smith (1868–1937)
- J. Gregory Smith (1818–1891)
- Levi P. Smith (1885–1970)
- Milford K. Smith (1906–1984)
- Peter Plympton Smith (born 1945)
- Worthington C. Smith (1823–1894)

=== Virginia State Senate ===
- Alfred C. Smith (1893–1962)
- Arthur R. Smith (1805–1865)
- Benjamin H. Smith (1797–1887)
- H. Selwyn Smith (1922–2013)
- J. Marion Smith (1880–1953)
- R. S. Blackburn Smith (1871–1928)
- Ralph K. Smith (born 1942)

=== Washington State Senate ===
- Adam Smith (Washington politician) (born 1965)
- John Smith (Washington politician) (born 1973)
- Linda Smith (American politician) (born 1950)

=== West Virginia Senate ===
- Anthony Smith (American politician) (1844–?)
- Joe L. Smith (1880–1962)
- Randy Smith (politician) (born 1960)

=== Wisconsin State Senate ===
- Augustus L. Smith (1833–1902)
- Charles F. Smith Jr. (1918–2001)
- Charles H. Smith (Wisconsin politician) (1863–1915)
- Herbert H. Smith (1898–?)
- Horatio N. Smith (1820–1886)
- Jeff Smith (Wisconsin politician) (born 1955)
- John B. Smith (Wisconsin politician) (1811–1879)
- Patrick Henry Smith (1827–1884)
- Perry H. Smith (1828–1885)
- Peter J. Smith (politician) (1867–1947)
- William E. Smith (politician) (1824–1883)
- William Lyman Smith (1878–1964)

=== Wyoming State Senate ===
- Darin Smith (fl. 2020s)

== See also ==
- Cindy Hyde-Smith (born 1959), U.S. senator from Mississippi since 2018, and before that a member of the Mississippi State Senate
- Kamina Johnson-Smith, Jamaican senator since 2009
- Alexander Smyth (1765–1830), Virginia State Senate
- Michael Smyth (politician) (died 1973), Irish Senate
- William James Smyth (1886–1950), Northern Irish Senate
- List of people with surname Smith
