= George Gauer =

American politician

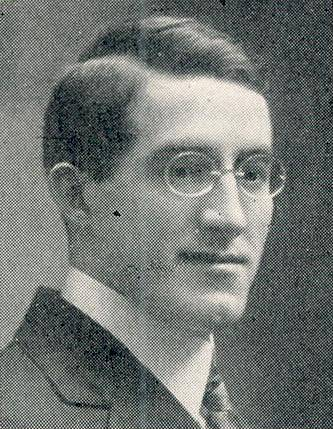
Gauer c. 1923

George Gauer (November 30, 1892 – May 3, 1992) was a printer and real estate salesman from Milwaukee, Wisconsin who served two terms as a Socialist member of the Wisconsin State Assembly.

Gauer was born in Milwaukee on November 30, 1892. He graduated from the Milwaukee public schools and worked as a printing press operator. When elected to the Assembly in 1922, he had been a member of the Pressmen's Union and of the Socialist Party for more than twelve years.

== Political career ==
He was elected in November, 1922 from the 14th Assembly district (17th Ward of the City of Milwaukee), receiving 2,046 votes to 1,493 for Republican incumbent Edward Vollmer and 137 for Democrat Edward J. Watson. He was assigned to the standing committee on the public welfare. When he ran for re-election in 1924, he lost to Republican Herbert H. Smith, who received 2,840 votes to Gauer's 2,549. Gauer became a public works inspector was assigned to the bureau of street construction and repair.

In 1926, Smith was not a candidate, and Gauer again faced Volmer for their old seat. Gauer won with 1984 votes to 1952 for Volmer and 384 for independent socialist Edward C. Werner. Gauer was assigned to the standing committees on excise and fees; and on highways. Gauer was not a candidate for re-election in 1928, and was succeeded by Republican Alfred Buntin.

As of 1946, Gauer was still an inspector for the City of Milwaukee.
