= Buntin =

Buntin is a surname. Notable people with the surname include:

- Alfred Buntin (1892–1953), American businessman and politician
- Bill Buntin (1942–1968), American basketball player
- Craig Buntin (born 1980), Canadian former pair skater
- Melinda Beeuwkes Buntin, American health economist
