= Irving, Wisconsin =

- Town
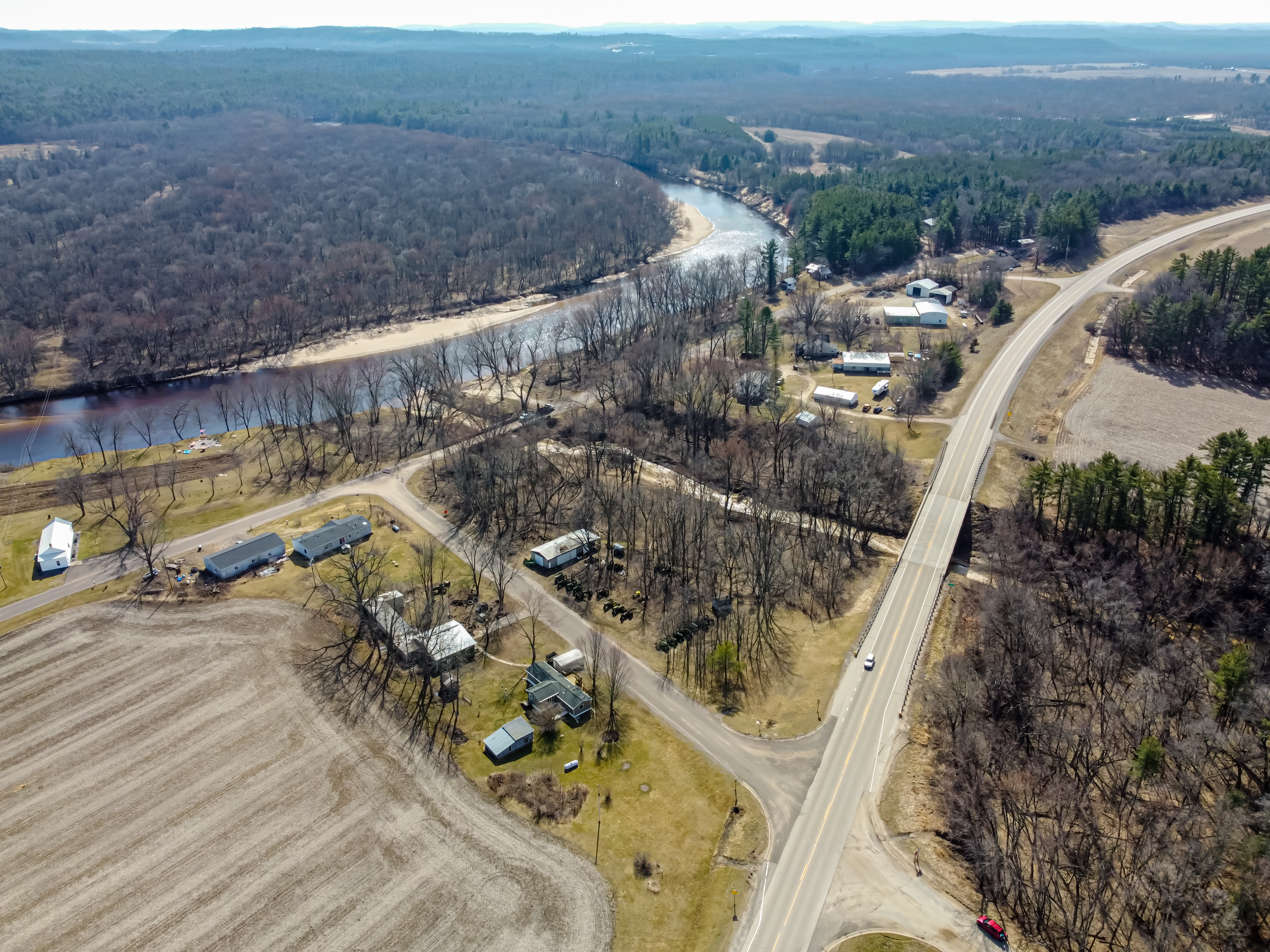
- Black River and Wis-54 run through town

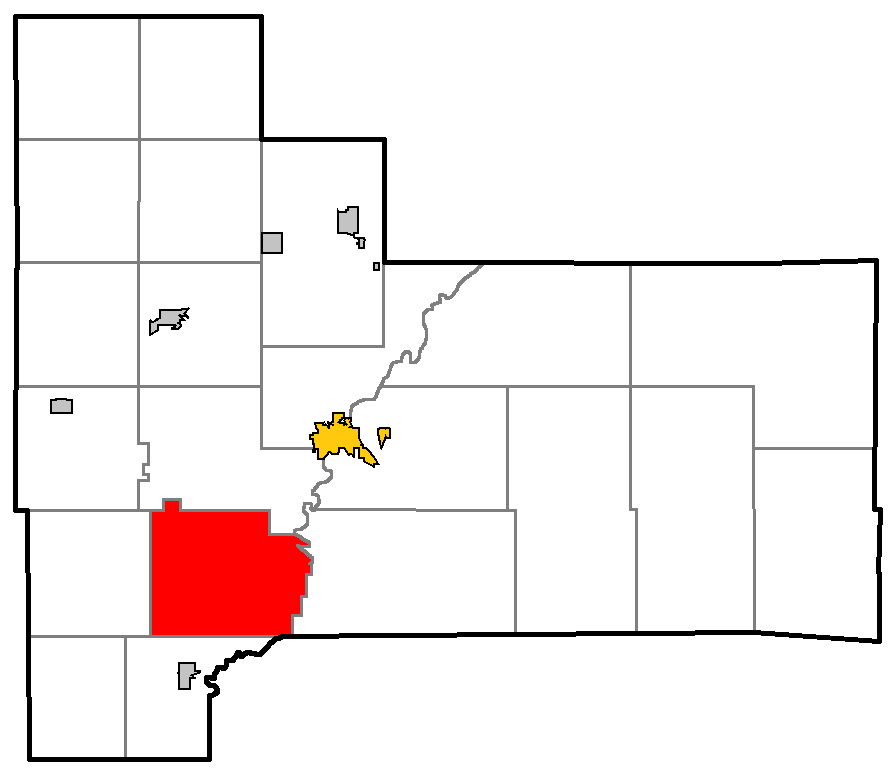
- Location of Irving, Jackson County

- Coordinates: 44°11′37″N 90°57′36″W
- Country: United States
- State: Wisconsin
- County: Jackson

Area
  - Total: 44.4 sq mi (115.0 km^{2})
  - Land: 43.9 sq mi (113.7 km^{2})
  - Water: 0.50 sq mi (1.3 km^{2})
- Elevation: 932 ft (284 m)

Population (2020)
  - Total: 853
  - Density: 19.4/sq mi (7.50/km^{2})
- Time zone: UTC-6 (Central (CST))
  - Summer (DST): UTC-5 (CDT)
- FIPS code: 55-37275
- GNIS feature ID: 1583437

Irving is a town in Jackson County, Wisconsin, United States. The population was 853 at the 2020 census.

== Geography ==
According to the United States Census Bureau, the town has a total area of 44.4 square miles (115.0 km^{2}), of which 43.9 square miles (113.7 km^{2}) is land and 0.5 square mile (1.3 km^{2}) (1.17%) is water.

== Demographics ==
As of the census of 2000, there were 602 people, 216 households, and 163 families residing in the town. The population density was 13.7 people per square mile (5.3/km^{2}). There were 237 housing units at an average density of 5.4 per square mile (2.1/km^{2}). The racial makeup of the town was 98.84% White, 0.33% African American, 0.50% Native American, and 0.33% from two or more races.

There were 216 households, out of which 39.4% had children under the age of 18 living with them, 66.2% were married couples living together, 3.7% had a female householder with no husband present, and 24.5% were non-families. 19.0% of all households were made up of individuals, and 8.3% had someone living alone who was 65 years of age or older. The average household size was 2.79 and the average family size was 3.24.

In the town, the population was spread out, with 29.7% under the age of 18, 6.6% from 18 to 24, 30.9% from 25 to 44, 21.4% from 45 to 64, and 11.3% who were 65 years of age or older. The median age was 36 years. For every 100 females, there were 115.0 males. For every 100 females age 18 and over, there were 110.4 males.

The median income for a household in the town was $37,625, and the median income for a family was $42,500. Males had a median income of $30,729 versus $18,409 for females. The per capita income for the town was $15,287. About 8.9% of families and 12.9% of the population were below the poverty line, including 15.2% of those under age 18 and 10.3% of those age 65 or over.

== Notable people ==
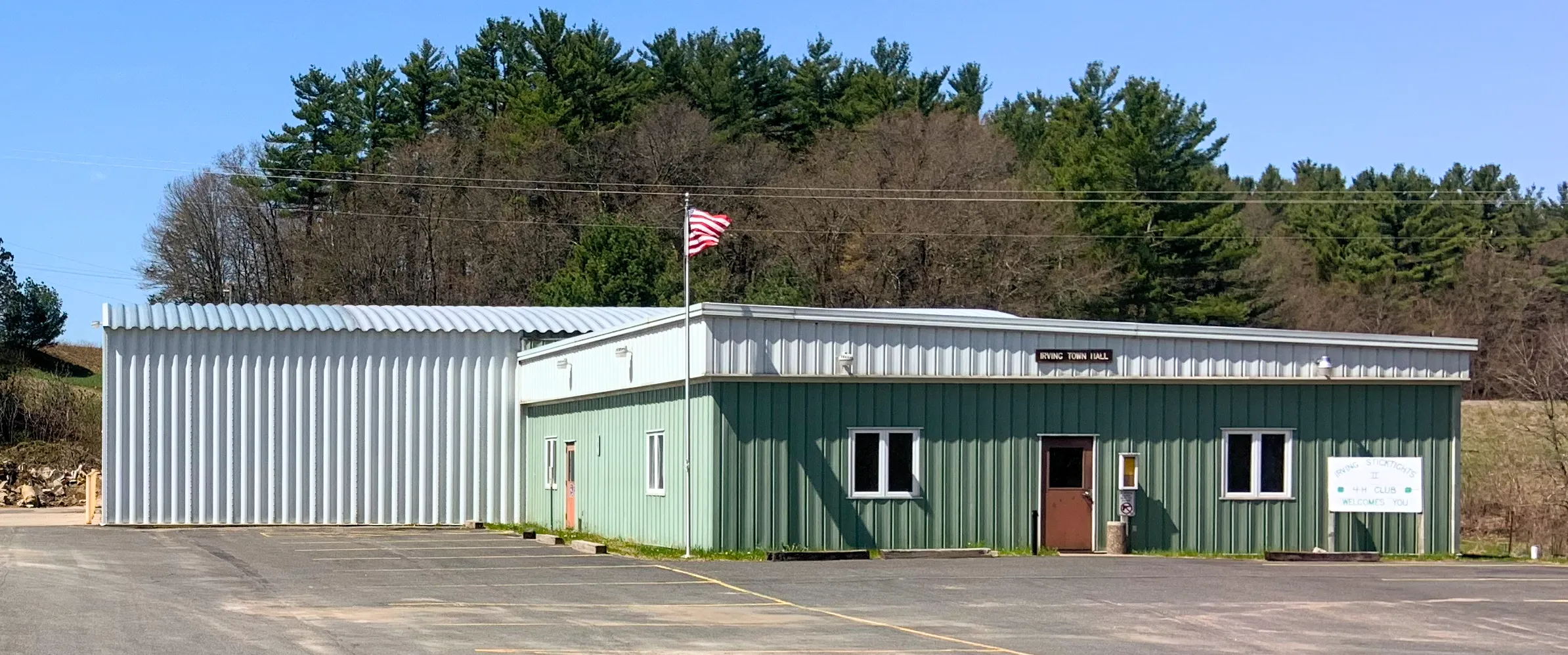
Irving Town Hall

- Emil G. Gilbertson, Wisconsin State Representative and farmer, was born in the town
