= Donald C. McDowell =

American politician

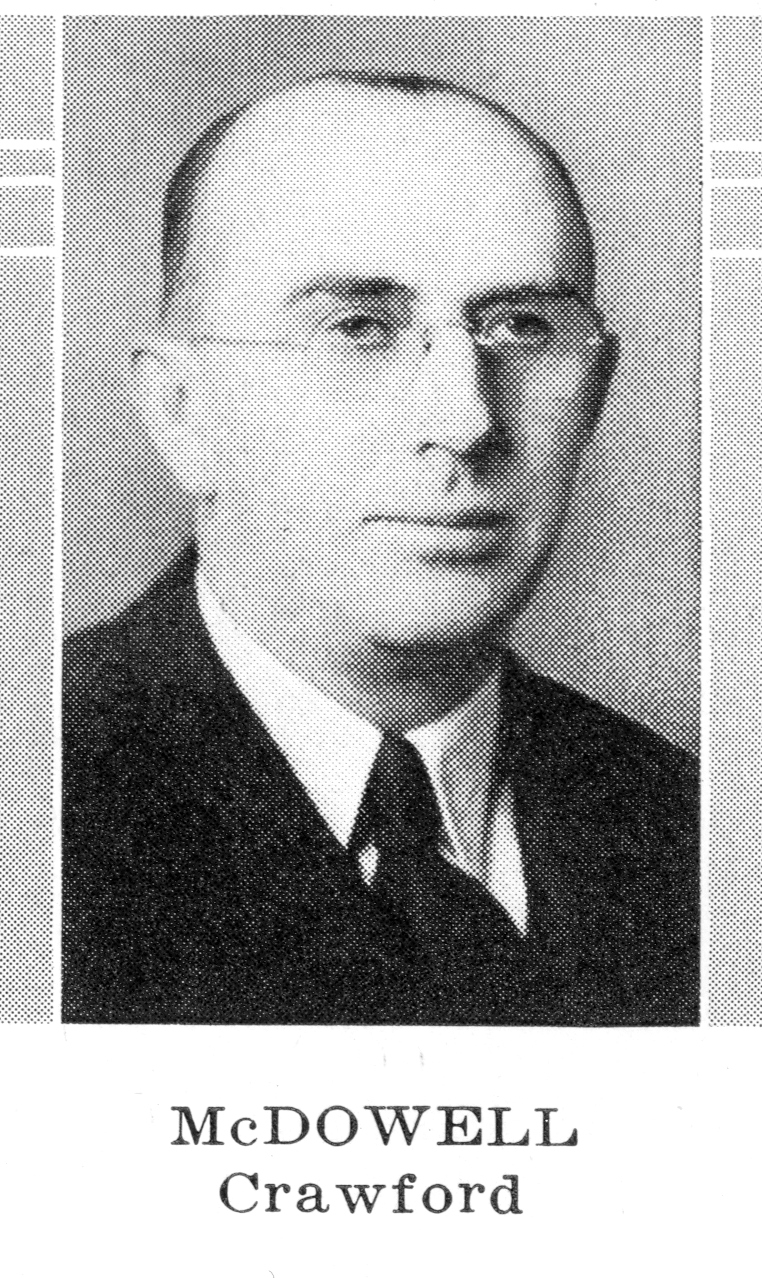
Donald C. McDowell

Donald Clair McDowell (August 27, 1890 – February 22, 1973) was a member of the Wisconsin State Assembly.

== Biography ==
McDowell was born on August 27, 1890, in Mount Sterling, Wisconsin, the son of assemblyman Archie J. McDowell. During World War I, he served in the United States Army. He died in 1973 and is buried in Soldiers Grove, Wisconsin.

== Political career ==
McDowell was a member of the Assembly from 1937 to 1948. He was chosen as speaker of the Assembly in 1945. He was also a delegate to the 1944 Republican National Convention.
