= Mary O. Kryszak =

American politician

Mary Olszewski Kryszak or Kryshak (July 27, 1875 – July 16, 1945) was a schoolteacher, bookkeeper, librarian and editor from Milwaukee, Wisconsin who served seven terms as a Democratic member of the Wisconsin State Assembly.

== Background ==
Born Mary Olszewski in Milwaukee on July 27, 1875, daughter of Constantine Olszewski (a railroad worker) and Rozalia (Martyn) Olszewski. She graduated from St. Mary's Academy and the Spencerian Business College, and later studied at the University of Wisconsin Extension in Milwaukee. She worked as a schoolteacher, music teacher, bookkeeper, librarian, and newspaper writer, including as assistant manager and bookkeeper for the Milwaukee Polish language daily newspaper Nowiny Polskie from 1908 to 1922), while also serving as a housewife and mother of three children. From 1921 to 1939 she was managing editor of the weekly newspaper Glos Polek ([Polish] Women's Voice) of the Zwiazek Polek w Ameryce (Fraternal Polish Women's Alliance of America); she had founded the St. Catherine Society, a local lodge of the Zwiazek, in 1912, and would remain its president until her death.

== First term and national attention ==
In 1928, she unseated Republican State Representative Louis Polewczynski to represent the Eighth Milwaukee County district (the 8th and 14th wards of the City of Milwaukee), taking 3,889 votes to 2,659 for Socialist Nick Wroblewski and 2,239 for the incumbent Polewczynski. She already had three grown children (Leo, Rose and Wanda) "through school and with jobs of their own" when first elected to the Assembly in 1928. Although she had worked as a teacher, bookkeeper, assistant manager and newspaper editor before seeking office, stories in the national press stated that "Mrs. Kryszak 'takes in' hemstitching work at home when not engaged in lawmaking." She was the first woman elected to the legislature from Milwaukee County, and the first female Democrat to be elected to any state office. She was assigned to the standing committees on education and on public welfare.

== Personal life ==
On May 23, 1900, she married Anton L. Kryshak, a cigar maker, whom she later divorced; they had two daughters and one son. At the time of the divorce, she changed the spelling of her name from Kryshak to Kryszak; when first elected to the Assembly, the name change had already taken place.
