= Arthur Koegel =

American politician (1889–1974)

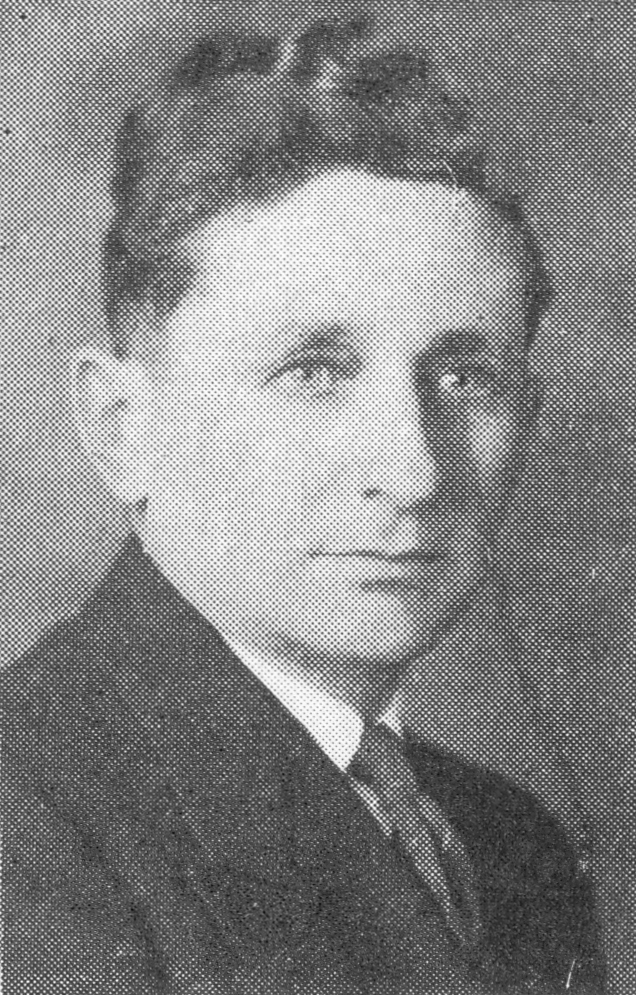
Koegel c. 1940

Arthur Koegel (May 2, 1889 – May, 1974) was a Socialist bricklayer from Milwaukee who served five terms from 1933 to 1942 as a member of the Wisconsin State Assembly.

== Background ==
Arthur Koegel was born May 2, 1889, in Milwaukee. He graduated from local public schools and became a bricklayer. As of his 1932 election, he had been a member of the Bricklayers, Masons and Plasterers International Union of America for 24 years, and had never held public office.

== Assembly service ==
Koegel was elected in November 1932 to the Assembly from the seventh Milwaukee County district (seventh ward of the City of Milwaukee), succeeding fellow Socialist Philip Wenz, who did not run for re-election. Koegel was unopposed in the primary election, and in the general election polled 3063 votes, to 2960 for Democrat Charles Jungman, and 1537 for Republican Robert Scheffing. He was assigned to the Assembly's standing committee on elections.

In 1934, he was again unopposed in the primary, and received 2243 votes, to 1639 for Democrat Fred Stich, 1206 for Progressive Rudolph Korthals, and 665 for Republican George Becker. For the new session, he was assigned to the Assembly Committees on Contingent Expenditures and on State Affairs.

In 1936, under the Socialist/Progressive electoral fusion arrangement then prevailing, he was for the first time opposed in the primary, although he defeated his opponent Mueller by over 2:1. He then won the general election, with 4741 votes to 3223 for Democrat Robert Lange. For the new session, he remained on State Affairs and was assigned to the Committee on Taxation.

In 1938 he was again unopposed in the Progressive/Socialist primary, and won re-election by 3030 votes, to 2048 for Republican George Schroeder, 1294 for Democrat Lange, and 69 votes for Herta Welch of William Lemke's Union Party. He transferred to the Assembly's Committee on Labor.

In 1940, he again faced primary opposition, prevailing over challenger Ludwigsen by over 3:1. In the general election, he pulled 4248 votes, to 3973 for Republican Martin E. Schreiber and 1828 for Democrat Clarence Findley. He remained on the Labor Committee.

In 1942, although unopposed in the Socialist primary (fusion having ended), he lost the general election, polling only 818 votes to 2696 for Republican Schreiber and 1652 for Progressive Walter Ensslin. He would twice attempt to reclaim his Assembly seat, coming in second in the 1944 race (ahead of the Republican and the Progressive); and third in the 1950 race, behind the Republican challenger as well as the Democrat.
