= Argonne (CDP), Wisconsin =

Census-designated place in Wisconsin, United States

Argonne, Wisconsin
- Census-designated place
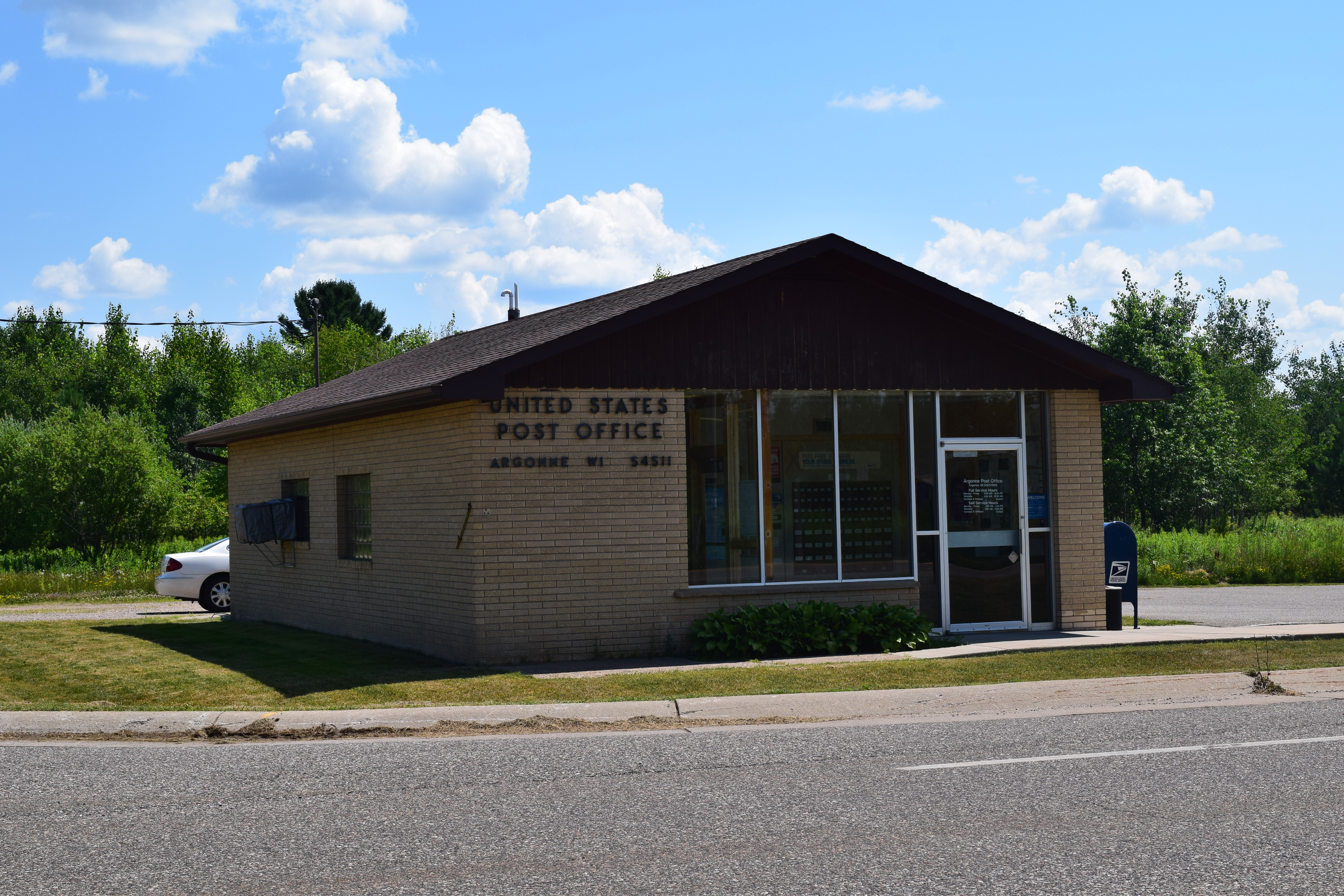
- Argonne post office

- Location within Wisconsin
- Coordinates: 45°39′35″N 88°52′45″W
- Country: United States
- State: Wisconsin
- County: Forest

Area
  - Total: 0.556 sq mi (1.44 km^{2})
  - Land: 0.556 sq mi (1.44 km^{2})
  - Water: 0 sq mi (0 km^{2})
- Elevation: 1,640 ft (500 m)

Population (2020)
  - Total: 135
  - Density: 243/sq mi (93.7/km^{2})
- Time zone: UTC-6 (Central (CST))
  - Summer (DST): UTC-5 (CDT)
- ZIP code: 54511
- Area codes: 715 & 534
- FIPS Code: 55-02600
- GNIS feature ID: 1578668

Argonne is an unincorporated census-designated place in the town of Argonne, Forest County, Wisconsin, United States. Argonne is located at the junction of state highways 32 and 55, 6 miles (9.7 km) north of Crandon. Argonne has a post office with ZIP code 54511. The community was established in 1888. As of the 2020 census, its population was 135, down from 160 at the 2010 census.
