= Waldwick, Wisconsin =

Town of Waldwick
- Town
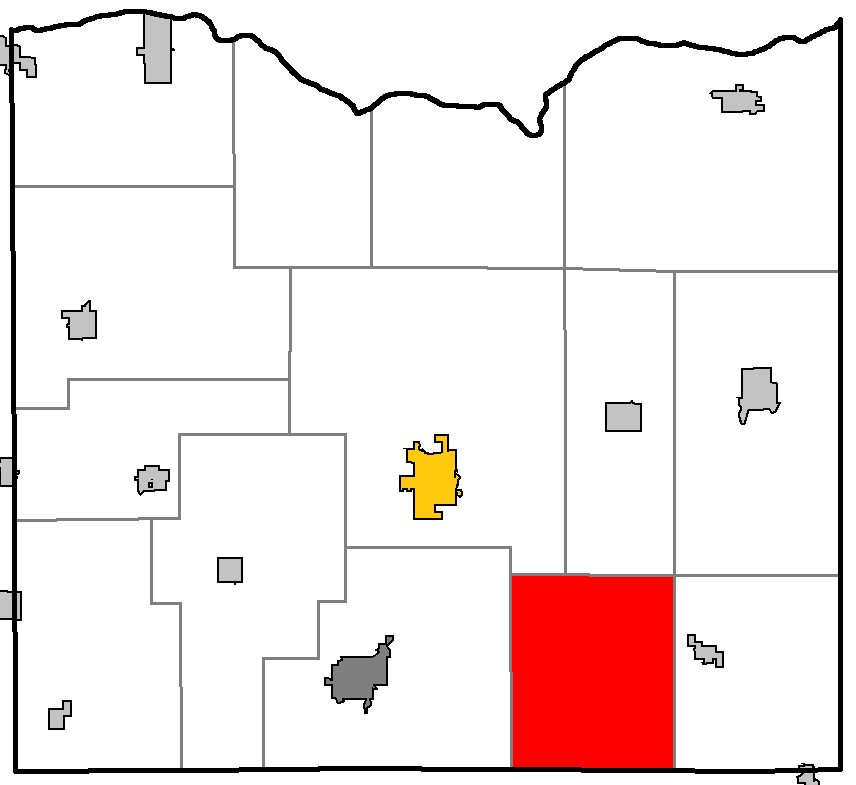
- Location of the Town of Waldwick, within Iowa County, Wisconsin

- Location of Iowa County, Wisconsin
- Coordinates: 42°52′0″N 90°0′35″W
- Country: United States
- State: Wisconsin
- County: Iowa

Area
  - Total: 41.9 sq mi (108.6 km^{2})
  - Land: 41.9 sq mi (108.6 km^{2})
  - Water: 0 sq mi (0.0 km^{2})
- Elevation: 1,093 ft (333 m)

Population (2020)
  - Total: 460
  - Density: 11/sq mi (4.2/km^{2})
- Time zone: UTC-6 (Central (CST))
  - Summer (DST): UTC-5 (CDT)
- Area code: 608
- FIPS code: 55-83150
- GNIS feature ID: 1584340
- Website: https://www.townofwaldwick.org/

The Town of Waldwick is a town located in Iowa County, Wisconsin, United States. The population was 460 at the 2020 census. The unincorporated community of Jonesdale is located in the town.

== Geography ==
According to the United States Census Bureau, the town has a total area of 41.9 square miles (108.6 km^{2}), all land.

== Demographics ==
As of the census of 2000, there were 500 people, 185 households, and 143 families residing in the town. The population density was 11.9 people per square mile (4.6/km^{2}). There were 192 housing units at an average density of 4.6 per square mile (1.8/km^{2}). The racial makeup of the town was 99.60% White, 0.20% from other races, and 0.20% from two or more races. Hispanic or Latino of any race were 0.20% of the population.

There were 185 households, out of which 30.3% had children under the age of 18 living with them, 70.8% were married couples living together, 4.3% had a female householder with no husband present, and 22.2% were non-families. 16.8% of all households were made up of individuals, and 7.6% had someone living alone who was 65 years of age or older. The average household size was 2.66 and the average family size was 3.03.

In the town, the population was spread out, with 26.0% under the age of 18, 5.6% from 18 to 24, 29.2% from 25 to 44, 23.8% from 45 to 64, and 15.4% who were 65 years of age or older. The median age was 38 years. For every 100 females, there were 111.9 males. For every 100 females age 18 and over, there were 107.9 males.

The median income for a household in the town was $39,271, and the median income for a family was $39,792. Males had a median income of $28,750 versus $18,864 for females. The per capita income for the town was $15,446. About 10.0% of families and 13.6% of the population were below the poverty line, including 18.5% of those under age 18 and 8.6% of those age 65 or over.

== Notable people ==
- John S. Jackson, farmer and politician, was born in the town
