= Barney F. Spott =

American politician

Barney Francis Spott was a member of the Wisconsin State Assembly.

== Biography ==
Spott was born on January 14, 1898, in Milwaukee, Wisconsin. He attended La Salle Extension University. During World War I, Spott served in the United States Army. Spott was in the banking and insurance business. He died on March 31, 1975.

== Political career ==
Spott was a member of the Assembly from 1927 to 1929. He was a Republican.
