= Carlton W. Mauthe =

American politician and businessman

Carlton William Mauthe (April 18, 1907 – October 28, 1959) was an American politician and businessman.

Born in Fond du Lac, Wisconsin, Mauthe graduated from Fond du Lac High School. He then went to Babson Institute in Wellesley, Massachusetts. He worked in the typewriter and refrigerator businesses as an executive. Mauthe served in the Wisconsin State Assembly from 1929 to 1933 and was a Republican. Later, Mauthe was the first chairman of the Wisconsin Conservation Commission. Mautha died in a hospital in Fond du Lac, Wisconsin of injuries suffered from a two-car collision near Lomira, Wisconsin. At the time of his death, Mauthe was vice president of the Northern Casket Company.
