= Charles Schuette =

American politician

Charles Schuette (November 30, 1878 – May 19, 1934) was an American politician, railroad worker, and law enforcement officer.

Born in Manitowoc, Wisconsin, Schuette worked for North Western Railroad from 1897 to 1911 and then worked in the grocery business. In 1921, Schuette served as sheriff of Manitowoc County, Wisconsin and was a Republican. Then, in 1927, Schuette served in the Wisconsin State Assembly. Schuette died at his home in Manitowoc, Wisconsin after being ill for a few months.
