= James A. Barker =

American politician (1857–1943)

James A. Barker (1857–1943) was a member of the Wisconsin State Assembly and the Wisconsin State Senate.

== Biography ==
Barker was born in Troy, New York in 1857. In 1883 in New York, he married Isabelle C. Webber (1861–1947), with whom he had a son and daughter. In 1910, the family moved to Antigo, Wisconsin. He died as a result of injuries sustained in a car accident on September 22, 1943, in Antigo.

== Career ==
Barker was a member of the Assembly from 1923 to 1924 for Langlade County and of the Senate from 1925 to 1932. He was a Republican.
