= John Mentink =

American politician

John Mentink (November 21, 1869 – August 16, 1953) was an American, farmer, politician, and businessman.

Born near Cedar Grove, Wisconsin, on a farm, Mentink was a farmer and raised Guernsey cattle and Percheron horses. Mentink was an auctioneer. He was also in the insurance, loans, real estate business. Mentink served as president of the Village of Cedar Grove, on the school board serving as clerk. Mentink also served on the Sheboygan County, Wisconsin Board of Supervisors and was a Republican. From 1925 until 1931, Mentink served in the Wisconsin State Assembly. Mentink died in Cedar Grove, Wisconsin.
