= Peter J. Smith (politician) =

American politician

Peter J. Smith (August 22, 1867 – April 2, 1947) was a member of the Wisconsin State Senate.

== Biography ==
Smith was born on August 22, 1867, in Denmark. In 1888, he married Ann Marie Lassen, they had five children. Smith died on April 2, 1947, in Eau Claire, Wisconsin.

== Career ==
Smith was elected to the Senate in 1928 and served until 1933. Additionally, he was an Eau Claire alderman and a member of the Eau Claire County, Wisconsin Board, as well as Chairman of the Eau Claire County Republican Party and a delegate to the 1924 Republican National Convention. Smith also served as grand secretary of the Scandinavian-American Fraternity.
