= Charles A. Budlong =

American politician

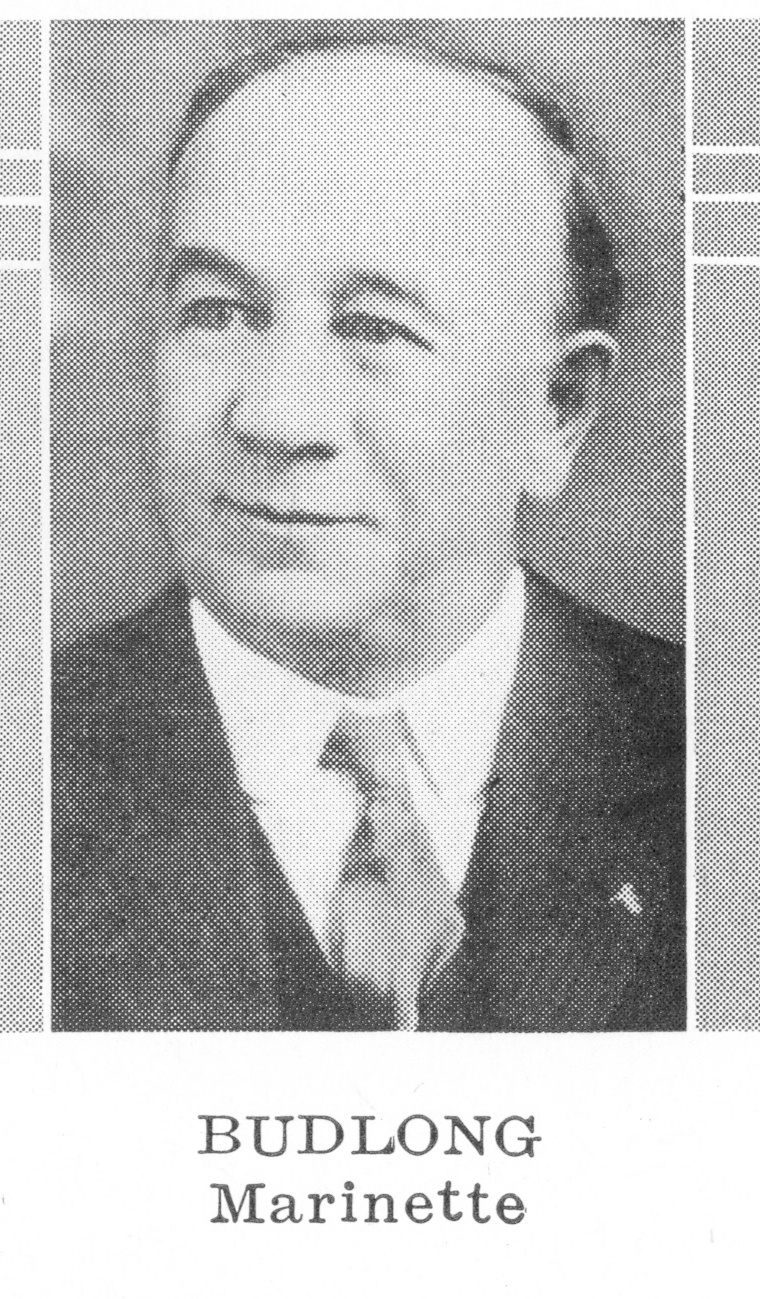
Charles A. Budlong

Charles A. Budlong (July 8, 1859 – February 22, 1947) was a member of the Wisconsin State Assembly.

== Biography ==
Charles Aaron Budlong was born on July 8, 1859, in Frankfort, New York, the son of John Aaron Budlong (1828–1859) and Julianna (Meyers) Budlong (1828–1888). He moved to Black Earth, Wisconsin, as a child.

His first job was as a telegraph operator for the Milwaukee Road railroad in Amberg. He then served as an immigration inspector for three years and a state board of control inspector for eight years, followed by four years as sheriff of Marinette County, Wisconsin. Budlong was a member of the Wisconsin State Assembly three times: first from 1915 to 1916, second from 1927 to 1934, and third from 1937 to 1940. He was also a delegate to the 1936 Republican National Convention.

Budlong withdrew from politics in June 1940 due to the illness of his wife, who died a month later. Charles Budlong died in Marinette on February 22, 1947.
