= John Gamper =

Swiss-born American farmer and politician

John Gamper (February 11, 1860 – October 29, 1946) was a Swiss-born American farmer and politician.

Born in Chur, Switzerland, Gamper went to University of Zurich. In 1882, Gamper emigrated to the United States, worked for the editorial staff of a German newspaper in Saint Louis, Missouri and then settled in Taylor County, Wisconsin in 1885. He owned farms in the towns of Browning and Deer Creek, Taylor County. He then moved to Medford, Wisconsin. Gamper served as sheriff and register of deeds of Taylor County. He served in the Wisconsin State Assembly from 1915 to 1933 as a Democrat and then as a Republican and was allied with the progressive wing of the Republican Party. Gamper died in Medford, Wisconsin.
