= Nels Larson =

American politician and businessman

Nels Larson (March 18, 1869 – May 30, 1937) was an American politician and businessman.

Born in Denmark, Larson emigrated with his parents in 1874 and settled in the Town of Winchester in Winnebago County, Wisconsin. Larson went to Oshkosh High School and Oshkosh Business College. He was a clerk and bookkeeper and owned a wholesale cheese and cold storage business. Larson served on the Neenah, Wisconsin Common Council, Neenah City Water Commission, and the Winnebago County Board of Supervisors. He was a member of the Republican Party. He served in the Wisconsin State Assembly in 1921, 1925 to 1931, and 1937. He died in a hospital in Madison, Wisconsin while still in office.
