= Argonne, Wisconsin =

- Town
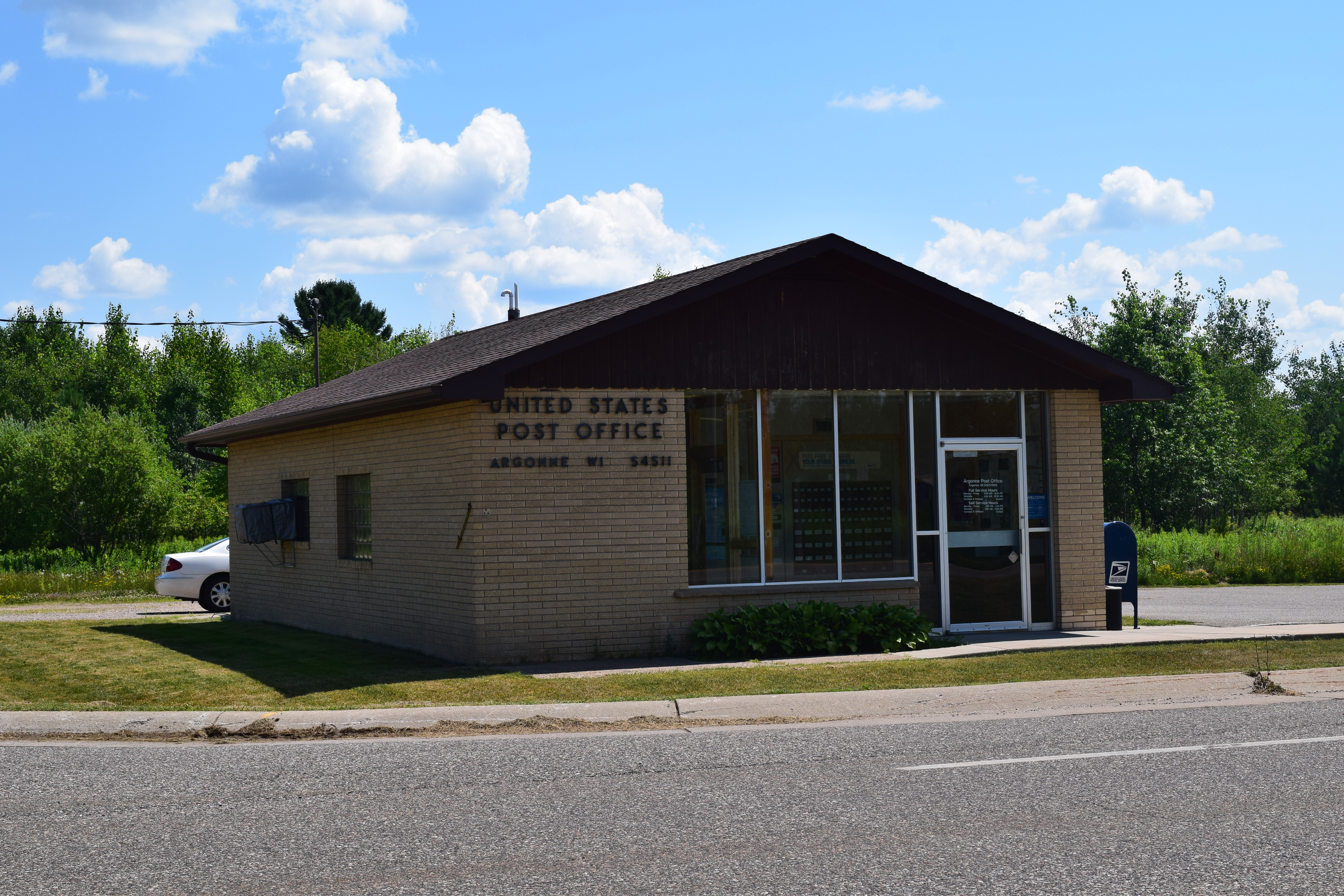
- Post office in the community of Argonne

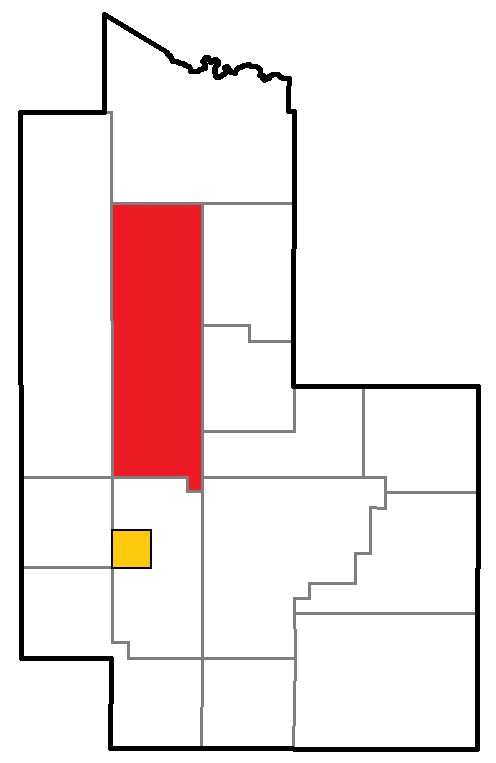
- Location of Argonne, within Forest County
- Coordinates: 45°43′58″N 88°51′8″W
- Country: United States
- State: Wisconsin
- County: Forest

Area
  - Total: 108.3 sq mi (280.5 km^{2})
  - Land: 108.2 sq mi (280.3 km^{2})
  - Water: 0.077 sq mi (0.2 km^{2})
- Elevation: 1,663 ft (507 m)

Population (2020)
  - Total: 546
  - Density: 5.05/sq mi (1.95/km^{2})
- Time zone: UTC-6 (Central (CST))
  - Summer (DST): UTC-5 (CDT)
- Area codes: 715 & 534
- FIPS code: 55-02625
- GNIS feature ID: 1582709
- Website: https://argonnewi.gov/

Argonne is a town in Forest County, Wisconsin, United States. The population was 546 at the 2020 census. The census-designated place of Argonne is located in the town. The unincorporated community of Wisconsin Junction is also located in the town.

== History ==
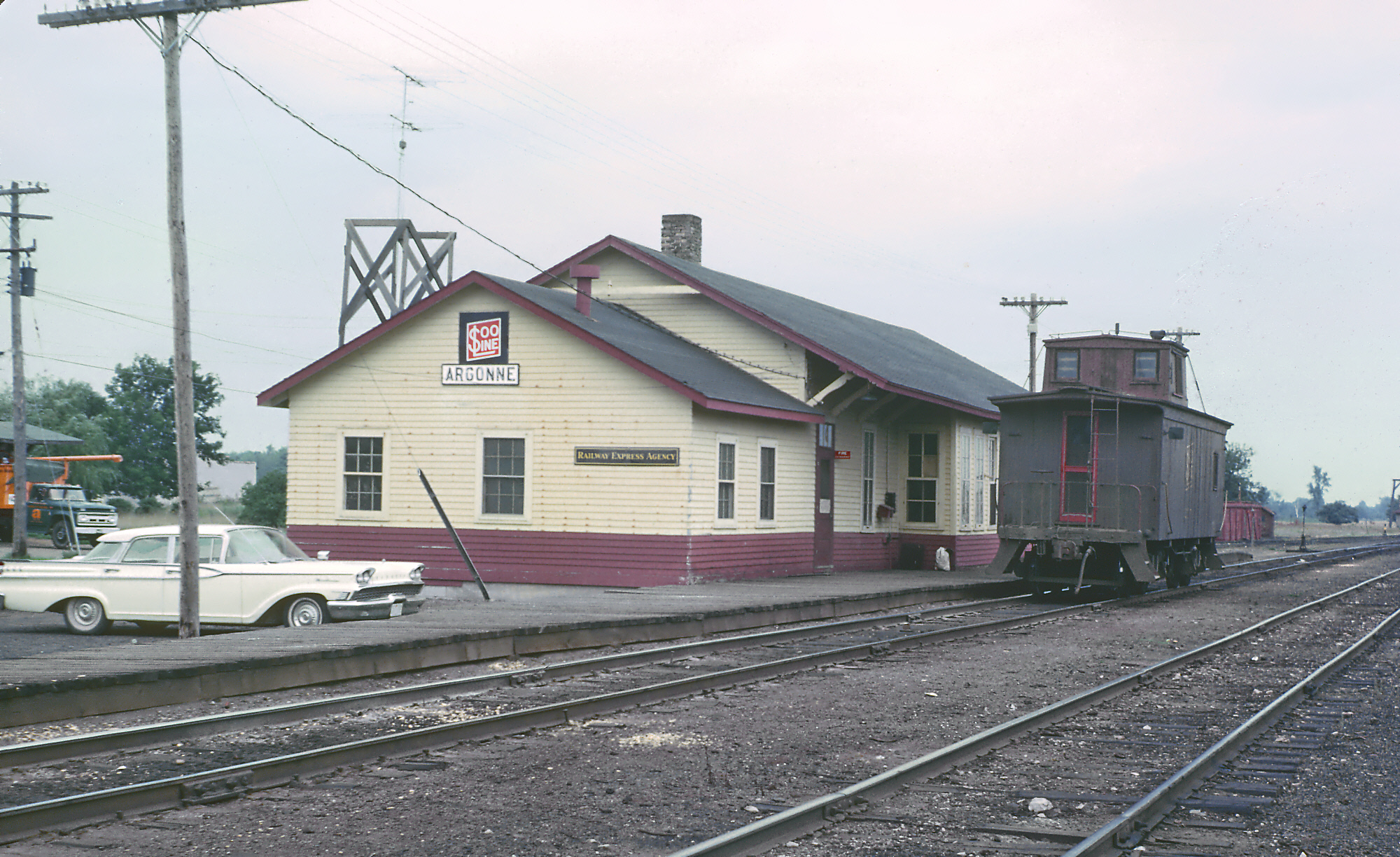
Argonne depot in 1963

Argonne was originally named Van Zile after Abraham Van Zile, who platted the area in 1888. A post office was established a year later. The town's name was changed to North Crandon in 1892 and later to Argonne—after the French Forest of Argonne—in 1929 to honor veterans of World War I.

The town is located on the rail line from Minneapolis towards Sault Ste. Marie which was the origin of the Minneapolis, St. Paul and Sault Ste. Marie Railroad. Whereas that line runs roughly east-to-west, another line diverges southwards at Wisconsin Junction just west of Argonne. This line to Neenah was one the last to be used by a mixed train, i. e. a train carrying both freight and passengers. From the late 1960s into the 1980s, the trains no longer carried dedicated passenger cars but riders could use the Caboose.

== Geography ==
According to the United States Census Bureau, the town has a total area of 108.3 square miles (280 km^{2}), of which 108.2 square miles (280 km^{2}) is land and 0.1 square miles (0.26 km^{2}), or 0.06%, is water.

== Demographics ==
As of the census of 2000, there were 532 people, 194 households, and 135 families residing in the town. The population density was 4.9 people per square mile (1.9/km^{2}). There were 314 housing units at an average density of 2.9 per square mile (1.1/km^{2}). The racial makeup of the town was 95.49% White, 0.19% African American, 3.20% Native American, 0.19% Asian, 0.19% from other races, and 0.75% from two or more races. Hispanic or Latino of any race were 0.94% of the population.

There were 194 households, out of which 36.1% had children under the age of 18 living with them, 58.8% were married couples living together, 4.1% had a female householder with no husband present, and 29.9% were non-families. 24.7% of all households were made up of individuals, and 10.3% had someone living alone who was 65 years of age or older. The average household size was 2.74 and the average family size was 3.35.

In the town, the population was spread out, with 27.6% under the age of 18, 11.1% from 18 to 24, 29.3% from 25 to 44, 18.8% from 45 to 64, and 13.2% who were 65 years of age or older. The median age was 35 years. For every 100 females, there were 112.8 males. For every 100 females age 18 and over, there were 115.1 males.

The median income for a household in the town was $40,909, and the median income for a family was $44,821. Males had a median income of $35,417 versus $20,625 for females. The per capita income for the town was $18,169. About 7.7% of families and 10.1% of the population were below the poverty line, including 9.2% of those under age 18 and 7.1% of those age 65 or over.

== Notable people ==
- Joseph D. Grandine, Wisconsin State Representative and farmer, lived in the town
