= Frank L. Prescott =

American businessman and politician

Frank Lewis Prescott (1878-1956) was a member of the Wisconsin State Assembly.

== Biography ==
Prescott was born on October 27, 1878, in Milwaukee, Wisconsin. He would become involved in advertising and publishing. Prescott died on December 12, 1956, in Honolulu, Hawaii, where he had been living since 1952.

== Political career ==
Prescott was elected to the Assembly in 1915, 1920, 1922, and 1924. He was a Republican.
