= C. N. Saugen =

American politician

Christian Nelson Saugen (January 1, 1852 – July 28, 1930) was a member of the Wisconsin State Assembly.

== Biography ==
A Norwegian emigrant, Saugen was born on January 1, 1852. He moved with his parents to Trempealeau County, Wisconsin in 1866. In 1876, he moved Pleasant Valley, Eau Claire County, Wisconsin.

== Career ==
Saugen was elected to the Assembly in 1904, 1916, 1922, 1924, 1926 and 1928. Additionally, he was a member of the County Board of Eau Claire County, Wisconsin and Assessor of Pleasant Valley. He was a Republican.
