= Earl D. Hall =

American politician

Earl Dean Hall (born July 15, 1879, in Tunnel City, Wisconsin) was a member of the Wisconsin State Assembly. He was elected to the Assembly in 1924 and served until 1937 and then from 1951 to 1955 as a Republican and as a Progressive. Additionally, he was a member of the Monroe County, Wisconsin Board of Supervisors and served on the Monroe County Highway Commission. Hall worked for the railroad and was a farmer. Hall died from a heart attack on May 23, 1959.
