= John M. Dihring =

American farmer, businessman, and politician

John M. Dihring (January 13, 1862 – March 8, 1941) was an American farmer, businessman, and politician.

Born in the town of Theresa, Dodge County, Wisconsin, Dihring was a farmer and livestock dealer in the town of LeRoy in Dodge County. He was also involved in the Banking and insurance businesses. Dihring served as chairman of the LeRoy Town Board and on the school board. Dihring served in the Wisconsin State Assembly from 1925 to 1931 and was a Republican. Dihring died at his house in Brownsville, Wisconsin.
