= Evan G. Davies =

American politician

Evan G. Davies was a member of the Wisconsin State Assembly.

== Biography ==
Davies was born on July 14, 1877, in Genesee, Wisconsin. He died there on November 22, 1967, and was buried in Wales, Wisconsin.

== Assembly career ==
Davies was a member of the Assembly during the 1925, 1927, 1929 and 1931 sessions. He was a Republican.
