= Emil G. Gilbertson =

American politician

- Born: September 14, 1870 the town of Irving, Jackson County, Wisconsin
- Died: November 5, 1949 (aged 79)
- Citizenship: American
- Education: The Black River Falls High School
- Occupations: American politician and farmer

Emil G. Gilbertson (September 14, 1870 – November 5, 1949) was an American politician and farmer.

Born in the town of Irving, Jackson County, Wisconsin, Gilbertson went to the Black River Falls High School in Black River Falls, Wisconsin. Gilbertson was a farmer in the town of Irving. He served as the Irving town clerk and was a member of the school board. He also served on the Jackson County Board of Supervisors and was the chairman of the county board. In 1927 and 1929, Gilbertson served in the Wisconsin State Assembly and was a Republican. In 1930, Gilbertson and his wife moved to a house in Black River Falls, Wisconsin. Gilbertson died in a hospital in Black River Falls, Wisconsin.
