= Harry E. Stephens =

American politician

Harry E. Stephens (November 2, 1857 – November 28, 1939) was a member of the Wisconsin State Assembly.

Stephens was born in Lafayette County, Wisconsin. He served in the Assembly during the 1927, 1929 and 1931 sessions. In addition, he was mayor of Platteville, Wisconsin and a partner in the Blockhouse Mining company. He was a Republican.
