= Gustave Rheingans =

American politician and farmer

Gustave Rheingans (September 8, 1890 – February 28, 1951) was an American politician and farmer.

Born in the Town of Eagle Point, Chippewa County, Wisconsin, Rheingans grew up on a farm. In 1920, he moved to Chippewa Falls, Wisconsin, where he worked for the Farmers Produce Company and was involved in dairy and truck farming. He also worked as a clerk in a hardware store.

Rheingans served as a Republican member of the Wisconsin State Assembly. He also held the position of sergeant at arms in the Wisconsin Legislatures during the 1931, 1935, and 1937 sessions. He died in Chippewa Falls, Wisconsin in 1951.
