= Erastus G. Smith =

American politician (1855–1937)

Erastus G. Smith (1855-1937) was a member of the Wisconsin State Assembly and Dean of Beloit College.

== Biography ==
Smith was born on April 30, 1855, in South Hadley, Massachusetts. He graduated from Amherst College and the University of Göttingen. On December 26, 1883, he married Elizabeth Mayher. Gilbert Morgan Smith was among their children. Smith died of a myocardial infarction on June 19, 1937. He was buried in Beloit, Wisconsin.

== Academic career ==
Smith became Professor of Chemistry at Beloit College in 1881. He retired as Professor Emeritus in 1921. From 1903 to 1904, he served as Dean.

== Political career ==
Smith was a member of the Assembly during the 1927, 1929 and 1931 sessions. Previously, he was Mayor of Beloit from 1887 to 1888, 1888-1889, 1891 to 1892 and 1924 to 1926. He was a Republican.
