= Albert J. Baker =

American politician

Albert James Baker (December 14, 1874 – March 28, 1964) was an American politician, farmer, and businessman.

== Life ==
Born in the town of Primrose, Wisconsin, Baker was a farmer and was in the creamery and insurance business. He married Elizabeth Erfurth (1877–1950) and, following her death, then married Bertha Bowers Skow (1888–1971). He died at his home in Mount Horeb, Wisconsin in 1964, leaving an estate worth over $77,000.

== Political career ==
He served as the Primrose town chairman (similar to mayor) and town assessor. Baker also served on the school board. Baker served in the Wisconsin State Assembly from 1927 to 1939 and from 1940 to 1944. He was a Republican.
