= John S. Jackson (Wisconsin politician) =

American farmer and politician

John S. Jackson (November 9, 1874 – February 26, 1960) was an American farmer and politician.

Born in the town of Waldwick, Iowa County, Wisconsin, Jackson was a farmer and was President of the Southwestern Wisconsin Shipping Association. He served as chairman of the Mineral Point Town Board. He also served on the Iowa County Board of Supervisors. Jackson also served on the school board and was the school board clerk. Jackson served in the Wisconsin State Assembly from 1927 to 1939 and was a Progressive or a Republican. Jackson died in Dodgeville, Wisconsin.
