= Leroy D. Eastman =

American politician

Leroy D. Eastman (March 21, 1872 – November 20, 1945) was an American businessman, farmer, and politician.

Born in Hazel Green, Wisconsin, Eastman worked in a bank and lumberyard in Cobb, Wisconsin. He also worked in lumberyards in other places in Wisconsin: Mineral Point, Montfort, and Lancaster, Wisconsin. He was president of the Eastman Cartwright Lumber Company and the Livingston Lumber Company in Livingston, Wisconsin. Eastman also was a farmer and cattle breeder. Eastman served on the Lancaster Common Council from 1906 to 1914 and then on the Grant County Board of Supervisors; Eastman was chairman of the county board. Eastman served in the Wisconsin State Assembly in 1927 and 1929 and was a Republican. Eastman died in Lancaster, Wisconsin.
