= Michael J. Mersch =

American politician

Michael J. Mersch (August 2, 1868 – March 8, 1954) was an American building contractor and politician.

Born in the town of Sharon, Portage County, Wisconsin, Mersch lived on a farm and then worked in the building business. He went to the Stevens Point Business College. Mersch served on the Stevens Point School and Vocational Boards. He also served on the Portage County Board of Supervisors and was chairman of the board, Mersch was a Democrat and served in the Wisconsin State Assembly from 1927 to 1931. From 1938 to 1941, Mersch served as Portage County Highway Commissioner, Mersch died in a hospital in Stevens Point, Wisconsin where he had lived.
