= Thomas H. Conway =

American politician and businessman

Thomas Henry Conway (February 9, 1860 – May 1, 1940) was an American politician and businessman.

Born in Troy, New York, Conway went to public schools and to the Homer Academy in Homer, New York. He was superintendent of the construction of steel and iron bridges and buildings in the United States. He was also in the insurance business. According to his Wisconsin legislative biography, Conway took a trip on a ship from Portland, Oregon, then around Cape Horn and then to Ireland and finally to New York City. Conway settled in Milwaukee, Wisconsin and was superintendent of the building of the Milwaukee City Hall from 1893 to 1895. From 1921 to 1931, Conway served in the Wisconsin State Assembly and was a Republican. In 1921, he introduced a bill to investigate the possibility of turning the Dells of the Wisconsin River into a state park. Conway said that he did not introduce any legislation during eight of the ten years he served as a state assemblyman. Conway died in Milwaukee, Wisconsin.
