= Archie J. McDowell =

American politician

Archie James McDowell (1863–1938) was a member of the State Assembly, Wisconsin, United States.

== Biography ==
McDowell was born in Avon, Wisconsin. He moved with his parents to Crawford County, Wisconsin in 1870. In 1898, he graduated from what is now the Medical College of Wisconsin. He was the father of Wisconsin assemblyman Donald C. McDowell.

== Political career ==
McDowell was elected to the Assembly in 1924, 1926 and 1928. Other positions he held include president (similar to mayor) of Soldiers Grove, Wisconsin. He was a Republican.
