= Joseph D. Grandine =

American politician

Joseph Grandine

Member of the Wisconsin State Assembly
- In office 1921–1929

Personal details
- Born: Joseph Daniel Wesley Grandine; November 14, 1860 Wayne County, New York, U.S.
- Died: January 9, 1950 (aged 90) Rhinelander, Wisconsin, U.S.
- Party: Republican

Joseph Daniel Wesley Grandine (November 14, 1860 – January 9, 1950) was an American farmer and politician. He was a member of the Wisconsin State Assembly from 1921 to 1929.

== Early life ==
Born in Wayne County, New York, Grandine moved with his family to Menasha, Wisconsin, where he attended high school.

== Career ==
Grandine worked as a farmer in Argonne, Wisconsin. He was president of the North Crandon school board. He unsuccessfully campaigned for the Wisconsin State Assembly in 1912. Grandine served as a Republican in the Wisconsin State Assembly from 1921 to 1929.

== Death ==
Grandine died at his daughter's house in Rhinelander, Wisconsin.
