= Peter Ebbe =

American politician

Peter Ebbe (May 4, 1865 – June 3, 1947) was an American politician and businessman.

Born in Denmark, Ebbe emigrated to the United States in 1883 and settled in Wood County, Wisconsin. He was in the lumber business, operated a sawmill, and was a farmer. Ebbe served as postmaster and on the school board. He was also a member of the town board and a fire warden. Ebbe lived in Marshfield, Wisconsin. From 1927 to 1933, Ebbe served in the Wisconsin State Assembly and was a Republican. Ebbe died at his home in Arcadia, California.
