= Walter Hunt (politician) =

American politician

Walter H. Hunt (September 5, 1868 – May 4, 1942) was a member of the Wisconsin State Senate.

== Biography ==
Hunt was born on September 5, 1868, in Kingston, Wisconsin. He graduated from Valparaiso University. Later, he enlisted in the United States Army. He died in River Falls, Wisconsin in 1942.

== Political career ==
Hunt was elected to the Senate in 1924 as a Republican. In 1934, he was a candidate in the Wisconsin Progressive Party primary for the United States House of Representatives from Wisconsin's 9th congressional district, losing to Merlin Hull.
