= Oscar J. Schmiege =

American politician and jurist

Oscar John Schmiege (March 29, 1902 – July 29, 1961) was an American politician and jurist.

== Biography ==
Born in Appleton, Wisconsin, Schmiege graduated from Appleton High School. In 1925, Schmeige received his bachelor's degree in civil engineering from the University of Wisconsin. He worked for the Wisconsin Highway Commission and a railroad. Schmiege served in the Wisconsin State Assembly from 1927 to 1933 and was a Republican. While in the Wisconsin Assembly, Schmiege received his law degree from the University of Wisconsin Law School in 1928 and was admitted to the Wisconsin bar. Schmiege was district attorney for Outagamie County, Wisconsin and then became a criminal court judge. Schmiege died in Appleton, Wisconsin of a heart attack just after he gave instructions to a jury that was hearing a murder case.
