= Carl Schoenebeck =

American politician

Carl Schoenebeck (February 2, 1866 – October 9, 1940) was a member of the Wisconsin State Assembly.

== Biography ==
Schoenebeck was born on February 2, 1866 in Germany. He moved to Oconto, Wisconsin in 1877 and Lena in 1895. In the latter part of his life, he lived in a cottage on Kelly Lake, near Suring, where he died of a heart attack on October 9, 1940.

== Career ==
In 1900, Schoenebeck was elected to the Wisconsin Natural History Society. Schoenebeck was elected to the Wisconsin State Assembly in 1926, where he beat out W. J. Thielke by about 3,000 votes. He served on the Insurance and Banking committee while in the legislature. Additionally, he was town chairman and a member of the village board of Lena, as well as deputy sheriff and a member of Lena's health board. He was a Republican.
