= Michael Laffey =

American politician

Michael Laffey (July 5, 1863 – November 16, 1935) was a member of the Wisconsin State Assembly.

== Biography ==
Laffey was born on June 5, 1863, in Clyman, Wisconsin. He would eventually become involved in real estate.

== Political career ==
Laffey was elected to the Assembly in 1922 and was re-elected in 1924, 1926 and 1928. Previously, he was a member of the Milwaukee, Wisconsin Common Council from 1896 to 1897. He was a Republican.
