= Philip Wenz =

American politician (1873–??)

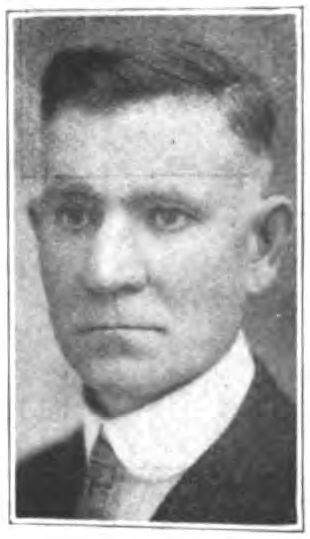
Wenz's official State Assembly portrait, 1927

Philip F. Wenz (born April 13, 1873) was a carpenter and machinist who served three terms (1927–1932) as a Socialist member of the Wisconsin State Assembly from the 7th Milwaukee County district (7th ward of the City of Milwaukee).

== Background ==
Wenz was born in Milwaukee on April 13, 1873. He received a public school education in the grade schools of Milwaukee and became an apprentice carpenter at the age of 16. Later he became a machinist, but preferred outdoor employment and again returned to carpentry. He sold insurance and stocks for five years "but found this business to vary considerably in seasons" and returned to carpentry.

== Political office ==
He was working as a carpenter when he was first elected to the Assembly in November 1926 (succeeding fellow Socialist [and machinist] Alex C. Ruffing) receiving 1,509 votes to 1,087 for Republican Henry Blackburn. He was assigned to the standing committee on municipalities.

He was re-elected in 1928, with 1801 votes to 815 for Ella Goess.

In 1930 he was unopposed in the primary election, and was re-elected in the general election, with 1443 votes to 1103 for former Assemblyman Charles Meising (a Republican), 314 for Democrat Fred Stich, and 34 for Jack Schwab. He retained his seat on the municipalities committee, but was additionally assigned to the Committee on Commerce and Manufactures, and to the joint committee on University and Capitol Heating Plants.

He did not run for re-election in 1932, and was succeeded by fellow Socialist Arthur Koegel.
