= S. Dell Penniston =

American politician

- Born: Seth O'Dell Penniston; June 9, 1870; Argyle, Wisconsin, United States
- Died: February 7, 1961 (aged 90); Argyle, Wisconsin, United States
- Occupations: farmer, politician
- Known for: member, Wisconsin State Assembly (1927–1933)
- Notable work: owner/operator of a 321-acre farm
- Political party: Republican
- Spouse: Mary Severson (d.1952)
- Children: 5
- Parents: George Penniston (father); Mary Ann (Brown) Penniston (mother)

Seth O'Dell "S. Dell" Penniston (June 9, 1870 – February 7, 1961) was an American farmer and politician. He was born in Argyle, Wisconsin to George (1832–1904) and Mary Ann (Brown) (1845–1943) Penniston who came to America with Seth's grandparents around 1852 from the Redmile/Plungar, Leicestershire region in England. He had a brother, a sister and five children. He and his wife Mary Severson had many grandchildren, most of whom remained in the Argyle area. She preceded him in death in 1952 at the age of 81.

He was the owner/operator of a 321-acre farm three miles (4.8 km) from Argyle on which he lived for 33 years. Penniston served on the Argyle Town Board for 10 years and was a Republican. Penniston was elected to the Wisconsin State Assembly without opposition and served from 1927 to 1933. Penniston died at his farm house in Argyle, Wisconsin.
