= Charles E. Tuffley =

American politician (1872–1956)

Charles Ellsworth Tuffley (December 5, 1872 – September 3, 1956) was an American farmer and politician.

Tuffley was born on a farm in Grant County, Wisconsin. He lived in Boscobel, Wisconsin and raised Holstein cattle. Tuffley served in the Wisconsin Assembly from 1921 to 1926 and was a Republican. He served on committees for elections and highways. Tuffley died at a hospital in Boscobel, Wisconsin.
