= Louis Polewczynski =

American politician

Louis Stanley Polewczynski (April 30, 1900 – December 14, 1973) was an American politician. He was a member of the Wisconsin State Assembly.

== Biography ==
Polewczynski was born in 1900 in Milwaukee, Wisconsin to Polish parents, Stanislaus Polewczynski and Apolinia Martynska. He would become a machinist.

== Political career ==
Polewczynski was elected to the Assembly in 1926. He was a Republican.
