= Joseph J. Huber =

American politician

Joseph J. Huber was a member of the Wisconsin State Assembly during the 1927, 1929 and 1931 sessions. He was a Republican. Huber was born on March 2, 1893.
