= Ernst J. Hoesly =

American politician, farmer, and businessman

Ernst J. Hoesly (June 16, 1885 – May 5, 1948) was a politician, farmer, and businessman.

Born in New Glarus, Wisconsin, Hoesly graduated from New Glarus High School and then went to Northwestern Business College in Naperville, Illinois. Hoesly was a cattle dealer and was president of the New Glarus State Bank. Hoesly served as assistant postmaster, served on the Green County, Wisconsin Board of Supervisors, and was chairman of the board. He also served as village clerk of New Glarus. From 1927 to 1939, Hoesly served in the Wisconsin State Assembly and was a Progressive. Hoesly died at his home in New Glarus, Wisconsin.
