= Henry Ellenbecker =

American politician

Henry Ellenbecker (February 27, 1871 – September 11, 1932) was an American politician and businessman.

Born in Belgium, Wisconsin, Ellenbecker moved to Wausau, Wisconsin, where he open a decorating company. He was also involved in the real estate and insurance business. Ellenbecker served on the Wausau Common Council and was president of the council. He also served on the Wausau City Water Commission. He served on the Wisconsin State Assembly from 1923 until his death. He was a Republican.
