= Alfred Buntin =

American businessman and politician

Alfred J. Buntin (August 2, 1892 – February 2, 1953) was an American businessman and politician.

== Biography ==
Born in Milwaukee, Wisconsin, Buntin went to Cream Brick Business College and University of Wisconsin in Milwaukee. Buntin was in the real estate business and had advocated several causes. In 1929, Buntin served in the Wisconsin State Assembly and was a Republican. He supported United States Senator Robert Taft for president. Buntis was a member of the Milwaukee Fourth of July Commission and also ran for Milwaukee County supervisor and for the Milwaukee Common Council losing the elections. Buntin died of a heart attack at his home in Milwaukee, Wisconsin.
