= Herman E. Boldt =

American politician

Herman E. Boldt was a member of the Wisconsin State Senate.

== Biography ==
Boldt was born on May 13, 1865, in Sheboygan Falls, Wisconsin. He married Minni Arnoldi and had seven children. Boldt died on April 5, 1941.

== Career ==
Boldt was a member of the Senate from 1925 to 1931. Additionally, he was the first mayor of Sheboygan Falls. He was a Republican.
