= Herbert H. Smith =

American politician

Herbert H. Smith was a member of the Wisconsin State Assembly and the Wisconsin State Senate.

== Biography ==
Smith was born on July 18, 1898, in Kingston, Ontario. He attended South Division High School in Milwaukee, Wisconsin, before graduating from the University of Wisconsin Law School in 1922.

== Career ==
Smith was elected to the Assembly in 1924. Later, he represented the 7th district of the Senate from 1927 to 1930. He was a Republican.
