= 54th Wisconsin Legislature =

Wisconsin legislative term for 1919–1920

←	53rd	55th	→
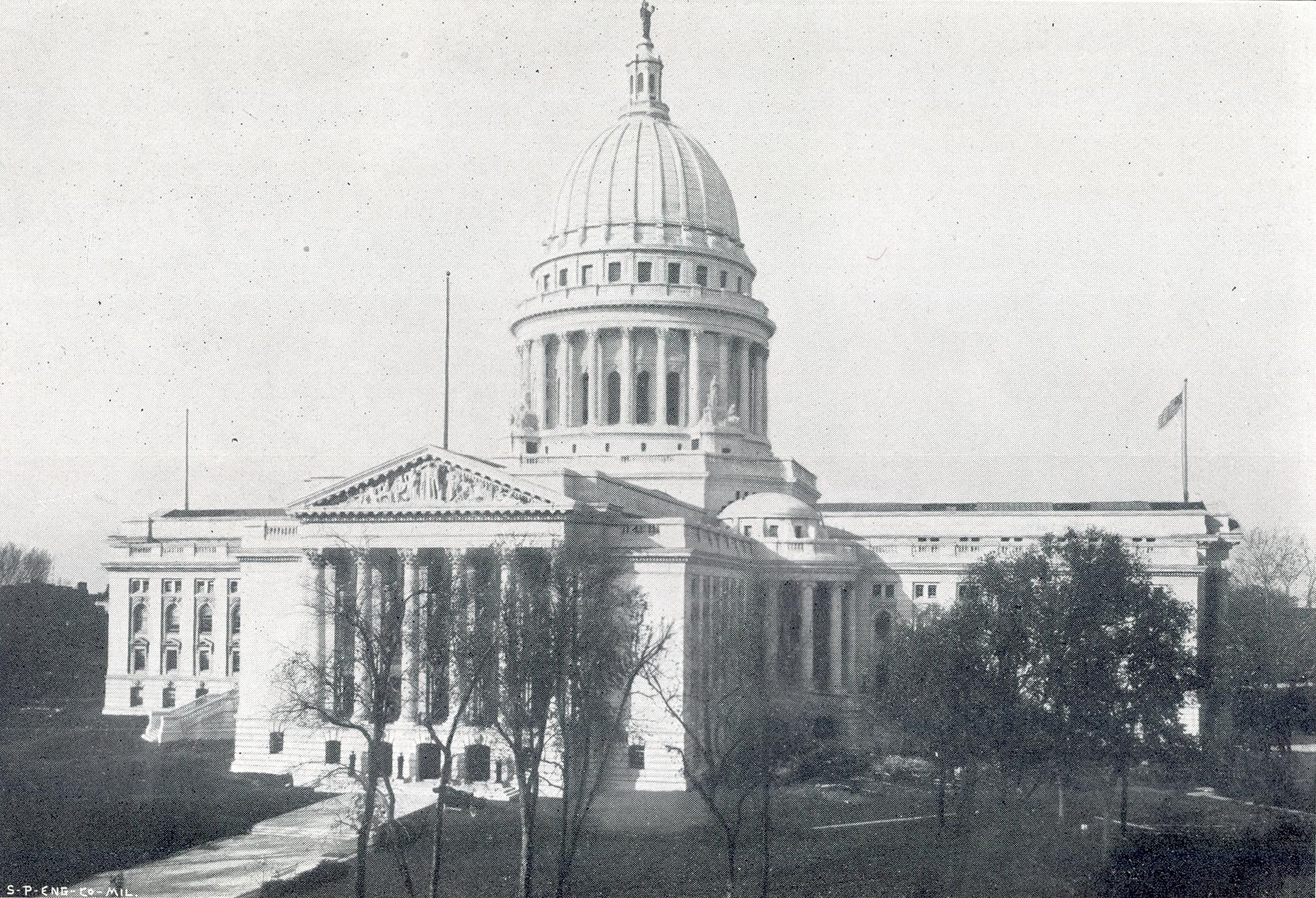
- Wisconsin State Capitol ca.1915

Overview
- Legislative body: Wisconsin Legislature
- Meeting place: Wisconsin State Capitol
- Term: January 6, 1919 – January 3, 1921
- Election: November 5, 1918

Senate
- Members: 33
- Senate President: Edward Dithmar (R)
- President pro tempore: Willard T. Stevens (R)
- Party control: Republican

Assembly
- Members: 100
- Assembly Speaker: Riley S. Young (R)
- Party control: Republican

Sessions
- Regular: January 8, 1919 – July 30, 1919

Special sessions
- Sep. 1919 Spec.: September 4, 1919 – September 8, 1919
- May 1920 Spec.: May 25, 1920 – June 4, 1920

The Fifty-Fourth Wisconsin Legislature convened from January 8, 1919, to July 30, 1919, in regular session, and re-convened in two special sessions in September 1919 and May 1920.

Senators representing odd-numbered districts were newly elected for this session and were serving the first two years of a four-year term. Assembly members were elected to a two-year term. Assembly members and odd-numbered senators were elected in the general election of November 5, 1918. Senators representing even-numbered districts were serving the third and fourth year of a four-year term, having been elected in the general election of November 7, 1916.

The governor of Wisconsin during this entire term was Republican Emanuel L. Philipp, of Milwaukee County, serving his third two-year term, having won re-election in the 1918 Wisconsin gubernatorial election.

== Major events ==
- January 16, 1919: The Eighteenth Amendment to the United States Constitution, establishing the prohibition of alcohol, was ratified by the requisite number of states to come into force.
- January 21, 1919: The Irish Republic declared independence from the United Kingdom, initiating the Irish War of Independence.
- January 25, 1919: The League of Nations was founded in Paris.
- June 28, 1919: The Treaty of Versailles was signed, formalizing Germany's settlement with the Entente at the end of World War I.
- August 11, 1919: The Green Bay Packers American football club was founded by Curly Lambeau and George Whitney Calhoun.
- October 2, 1919: U.S. President Woodrow Wilson suffered a severe stroke, leaving him partially paralyzed, with permanent neurological damage.
- October 28, 1919: The U.S. Congress overrode President Woodrow Wilson's veto of the Volstead Act, which established prohibition of alcohol enabled by the new 18th amendment.
- November 30, 1919: Health officials declared an end to the Spanish flu pandemic.
- March 19, 1920: The U.S. Senate failed in its last attempt to ratify the Treaty of Versailles. Wisconsin's senior U.S. senator Robert M. La Follette was among the leading "irreconcilable" holdouts preventing ratification.
- April 6, 1920: Wisconsin voters rejected two amendments to the state constitution:
  - to allow legislator pay to be set by law rather than fixed in the constitution.
  - to allow the legislature to decrease the number of state judicial circuits while maintaining or increasing the number of judges.
- July 13, 1920: Wisconsin chief justice John B. Winslow died in office. Justice Robert G. Siebecker immediately succeeded to the position of chief justice due to the rule of seniority.
- August 18, 1920: The Nineteenth Amendment to the United States Constitution, guaranteeing women the right to vote, was ratified by the requisite number of states to come into force.
- September 6, 1920: Attorney Burr W. Jones was appointed a justice of the Wisconsin Supreme Court by Governor Emanuel L. Philipp, to fill the vacancy caused by the death of chief justice John B. Winslow.
- November 2, 1920: 1920 United States general election:
  - Warren G. Harding elected President of the United States.
  - John J. Blaine elected Governor of Wisconsin.
  - Irvine Lenroot re-elected United States senator from Wisconsin.
- December 1, 1920: Mexican revolutionary general Álvaro Obregón was inaugurated as president of Mexico, effectively ending the Mexican Revolution.

== Major legislation ==
- Joint Resolution ratifying an amendment to the constitution of the United States relating to intoxicating liquors, 1919 Joint Resolution 1. Wisconsin's ratification of the Eighteenth Amendment to the United States Constitution.
- Joint Resolution relating to the league of nations, 1919 Joint Resolution 26. Endorsed the League of Nations and supported the United States joining.
- Joint Resolution relating to the establishment of a Jewish State of Palestine and for the granting of complete liberty to the Jewish people in all countries, 1919 Joint Resolution 34.
- Joint Resolution to amend section 21 of article IV of the constitution, relating to compensation of members of the legislature, 1919 Joint Resolution 37. Second legislative passage of a proposed amendment to the state constitution to allow the Legislature to set its own salary through the normal legislative process. The amendment was defeated by voters in the April 1920 election.
- Joint Resolution to amend section 4 of article VI of the constitution, relating to county officers, 1919 Joint Resolution 38. First legislative passage of a proposed amendment to the state constitution to remove term limits for sheriffs.
- Joint Resolution to amend sections 6 and 7, of article VII, of the constitution of the state of Wisconsin, relating to circuit judges, 1919 Joint Resolution 47. Second legislative passage of a proposed amendment to the state constitution to allow the Legislature to decrease the number of state judicial circuits. This amendment was also defeated by voters in the April 1920 election.
- Joint Resolution memorializing congress in behalf of the farmers to repeal the law advancing the time one hour, 1919 Joint Resolution 48. Communicating to Congress disapproval of daylight saving time.
- Joint Resolution to create section 3b of article XI of the constitution, relating to the indebtedness of municipal corporations, 1919 Joint Resolution 53. First legislative passage of a proposed amendment to the state constitution to extend the allowance for municipal indebtedness for the purpose of establishing street rail projects or for heat, water, and power utility purposes.
- Joint Resolution to amend section 5, article I, of the constitution, relating to trial by jury, 1919 Joint Resolution 58. First legislative passage of a proposed amendment to the state constitution to change the jury rules for civil cases to require a minimum of five-sixths majority for a valid verdict.
- Joint Resolution ratifying an amendment to the constitution of the United States relating to woman's suffrage, 1919 Joint Resolution 64. Wisconsin's ratification of the Nineteenth Amendment to the United States Constitution.

== Party summary ==
=== Senate summary ===
Senate partisan composition Democratic: 2 seats Socialist: 4 seats Republican: 27 seats

	Party (Shading indicates majority caucus)			Total	
	Dem.	Soc.	Rep.	Total	Vacant
End of previous Legislature	6	2	24	32	1
Start of 1st Session	2	4	27	33	0
Final voting share	18.18%		81.82%		
Beginning of the next Legislature	2	4	27	33	0

=== Assembly summary ===
Assembly partisan composition Democratic: 5 seats Socialist: 16 seats Republican: 79 seats

	Party (Shading indicates majority caucus)			Total	
	Dem.	Soc.	Rep.	Total	Vacant
End of previous Legislature	13	8	79	100	0
Start of 1st Session	6	16	78	100	0
From May 1, 1919 (Note: Republican Levi Withee Gibson (Taylor County) died.)	6	16	77	99	1
From Nov. 19, 1919 (Note: Republican Eber Simpson (Winnebago County) died.)	6	16	76	98	2
Final voting share	22.45%		77.55%		
Beginning of the next Legislature	2	6	92	100	0

== Sessions ==
- Regular session: January 8, 1919 – July 30, 1919
- September 1919 special session: September 4, 1919 – September 8, 1919
- May 1920 special session: May 25, 1920 – June 4, 1920

== Leaders ==
=== Senate leadership ===
- President of the Senate: Edward Dithmar (R)
- President pro tempore: Willard T. Stevens (R–Rhinelander)

=== Assembly leadership ===
- Speaker of the Assembly: Riley S. Young (R–Darien)

== Members ==
=== Members of the Senate ===
Members of the Senate for the Fifty-Fourth Wisconsin Legislature:

Dist.	Counties	Senator	Residence	Party
01	Door, Kewaunee, & Marinette	Herbert Peterson	Sturgeon Bay	Rep.
02	Brown & Oconto	Timothy Burke	Green Bay	Rep.
03	Kenosha & Racine	George L. Buck	Racine	Rep.
04	Milwaukee (Northern Part)	Herman C. Schultz	Milwaukee	Rep.
05	Milwaukee (Middle-West County & Central-Western City)	Rudolph Beyer	Milwaukee	Soc.
06	Milwaukee (Northern City)	W. C. Zumach	Milwaukee	Soc.
07	Milwaukee (Southern County)	Louis A. Arnold	Milwaukee	Soc.
08	Milwaukee (City South)	Louis Fons	Milwaukee	Rep.
09	Milwaukee (City Downtown)	David V. Jennings	Milwaukee	Dem.
10	Buffalo, Pepin, Pierce, & St. Croix	George B. Skogmo	River Falls	Rep.
11	Burnett, Douglas, & Washburn	Ray J. Nye	Superior	Rep.
12	Ashland, Bayfield, Price, Rusk, & Sawyer	A. H. Wilkinson	Bayfield	Rep.
13	Dodge & Washington	Herman J. F. Bilgrien	Iron Ridge	Rep.
14	Outagamie & Shawano	Antone Kuckuk	Shawano	Rep.
15	Calumet & Manitowoc	Henry Kleist	Rantoul	Soc.
16	Crawford, Grant, & Richland	Henry E. Roethe	Fennimore	Rep.
17	Green, Iowa, & Lafayette	Oscar R. Olson	Blanchardville	Rep.
18	Fond du Lac & Green Lake	Albert J. Pullen	North Fond du Lac	Rep.
19	Winnebago	Julius H. Dennhardt	Neenah	Rep.
20	Ozaukee & Sheboygan	Theodore Benfey	Sheboygan	Rep.
21	Adams, Juneau, Marquette, & Waushara	John A. Conant	Westfield	Rep.
22	Rock & Walworth	Lawrence E. Cunningham	Beloit	Rep.
23	Portage & Waupaca	Herman J. Severson	Iola	Rep.
24	Clark & Wood	Isaac P. Witter	Grand Rapids	Rep.
25	Langlade & Marathon	Claire B. Bird	Wausau	Rep.
26	Dane	Henry Huber	Stoughton	Rep.
27	Columbia & Sauk	George Staudenmayer	Caledonia	Rep.
28	Chippewa, & Eau Claire	Roy P. Wilcox	Eau Claire	Rep.
29	Barron, Dunn, & Polk	Algodt C. Anderson	Menomonie	Rep.
30	Florence, Forest, Iron, Lincoln, Oneida, Taylor, & Vilas	Willard T. Stevens	Rhinelander	Rep.
31	Jackson, Monroe, & Vernon	J. Henry Bennett	Viroqua	Rep.
32	La Crosse & Trempealeau	Eugene F. Clark	Galesville	Rep.
33	Jefferson & Waukesha	Charles Mulberger	Watertown	Dem.

=== Members of the Assembly ===
Members of the Assembly for the Fifty-Fourth Wisconsin Legislature:

Milwaukee County districts

Senate Dist.	County	Dist.	Representative	Party	Residence
21	Adams & Marquette		James F. McDowell	Rep.	Montello
12	Ashland		John C. Chapple	Rep.	Ashland
29	Barron		Clarence Clinton Coe	Rep.	Barron
12	Bayfield		Frank W. Downs	Rep.	Washburn
02	Brown	1	Thomas A. Delaney	Dem.	Green Bay
02	Brown	2	Niels P. Larsen	Rep.	Denmark
10	Buffalo & Pepin		Edwin F. Ganz	Rep.	
11	Burnett & Washburn		James H. Jensen	Rep.	Grantsburg
15	Calumet		Otto Lerche	Soc.	Rantoul
28	Chippewa		Thomas W. Bartingale	Rep.	
24	Clark		Harry Hewett	Rep.	
27	Columbia		W. R. Chipman	Rep.	Leeds
16	Crawford		O. P. Vaughan	Rep.	Wauzeka
26	Dane	1	Marcus E. Johnson	Rep.	Madison
26	Dane	2	James C. Hanson	Rep.	Christiana
26	Dane	3	Carl M. Grimstad	Rep.	Mount Horeb
13	Dodge	1	Jacob Scharpf	Rep.	Juneau
13	Dodge	2	Samuel R. Webster	Rep.	Elba
01	Door		Frank N. Graass	Rep.	
11	Douglas	1	James B. French	Rep.	Superior
11	Douglas	2	J. W. Conner	Rep.	
29	Dunn		Alonzo L. Best	Rep.	Tiffany
28	Eau Claire		Rush Bullis	Rep.	Washington
30	Florence, Forest, & Oneida		Ira E. Smith	Rep.	Cassian
18	Fond du Lac	1	Herman Schroeder	Rep.	Empire
18	Fond du Lac	2	John E. Johnson	Rep.	Brandon
16	Grant	1	John L. Grindell	Rep.	Platteville
16	Grant	2	John J. Ruka	Rep.	Boscobel
17	Green		William Olson	Rep.	Jordan
18	Green Lake		Samuel Owens	Rep.	Green Lake
17	Iowa		John T. Williams	Rep.	Dodgeville
30	Iron & Vilas		Joseph J. Defer	Rep.	Saxon
31	Jackson		William F. Dettinger	Rep.	Hixton
33	Jefferson	1	John Mitchell	Rep.	Palmyra
33	Jefferson	2	John W. Porter	Rep.	Oakland
21	Juneau		George Frohmader	Rep.	Camp Douglas
03	Kenosha		Peter M. Anderson	Rep.	
01	Kewaunee		William H. O'Brien	Dem.	Franklin
32	La Crosse	1	Carl Kurtenacker	Rep.	La Crosse
32	La Crosse	2	Orrin Fletcher	Rep.	Burns
17	Lafayette		John P. Sheldon	Rep.	Darlington
25	Langlade		Frank J. Olmsted	Rep.	Elcho
30	Lincoln		Walter B. Chilsen	Rep.	Merrill
15	Manitowoc	1	John Lorfeld	Rep.	Meeme
15	Manitowoc	2	Herman Roethel	Soc.	Kiel
25	Marathon	1	Charles Zarnke	Soc.	Flieth
25	Marathon	2	Herman Marth	Soc.	Wausau
01	Marinette		James Pedersen	Rep.	Marinette
09	Milwaukee	1	Jacob J. Killa	Dem.	Milwaukee
09	Milwaukee	2	Joseph Klein	Soc.	Milwaukee
09	Milwaukee	3	John P. Donnelly	Dem.	Milwaukee
05	Milwaukee	4	Albert Ehlman	Soc.	Milwaukee
08	Milwaukee	5	John Kaney	Rep.	Milwaukee
05	Milwaukee	6	Henry Sievers	Soc.	Milwaukee
05	Milwaukee	7	Alex C. Ruffing	Soc.	Milwaukee
08	Milwaukee	8	Frank Kubatzki	Dem.	Milwaukee
06	Milwaukee	9	Julius Kiesner	Soc.	Milwaukee
04	Milwaukee	10	Edwin Knappe	Soc.	Milwaukee
08	Milwaukee	11	William E. Jordan	Soc.	Milwaukee
08	Milwaukee	12	George Czerwinski	Dem.	Milwaukee
04	Milwaukee	13	John M. Sell	Soc.	Milwaukee
07	Milwaukee	14	John Masiakowski	Soc.	Milwaukee
05	Milwaukee	15	Frank X. Bauer	Soc.	Milwaukee
05	Milwaukee	16	George A. Bowman	Rep.	Milwaukee
07	Milwaukee	17	Frank Metcalfe	Soc.	Milwaukee
04	Milwaukee	18	Arnold C. Otto	Rep.	Milwaukee
07	Milwaukee	19	Delbert Miller	Rep.	West Allis
31	Monroe		Miles Hineman	Rep.	Tomah
02	Oconto		George E. Ansorge	Rep.	Oconto
14	Outagamie	1	Clinton B. Ballard	Rep.	Grand Chute
14	Outagamie	2	Anthony M. McClone	Rep.	Deer Creek
20	Ozaukee		Louis L. Pierron	Rep.	Belgium
10	Pierce		Charles E. Hanson	Rep.	River Falls
29	Polk		Axel Johnson	Rep.	Apple River
23	Portage		Harold J. Week	Rep.	Stevens Point
12	Price		Hugo Kandutsch	Rep.	Kennan
03	Racine	1	Robert Mutter	Rep.	Racine
03	Racine	2	Henry F. Johnson	Rep.	Norway
28	Richland		John C. Anderson	Rep.	Cazenovia
22	Rock	1	Thomas S. Nolan	Rep.	Janesville
22	Rock	2	Alonzo J. Mathison	Rep.	Beloit
12	Rusk & Sawyer		John H. Hellweg	Rep.	Hayward
27	Sauk		George H. Hood	Rep.	Baraboo
14	Shawano		King Weeman	Rep.	Shawano
20	Sheboygan	1	Charles Burhop	Soc.	Sheboygan
20	Sheboygan	2	R. B. Melvin	Rep.	Greenbush
10	St. Croix		George Oakes	Rep.	New Richmond
30	Taylor		L. W. Gibson (died May 1, 1919)	Rep.	Medford
32	Trempealeau		John A. Markham	Rep.	Independence
31	Vernon		Clarence H. Carter	Rep.	Readstown
23	Walworth		Riley S. Young	Rep.	Darien
13	Washington		Alfred G. Becker	Rep.	Addison
33	Waukesha	1	John F. Buckley	Rep.	Waukesha
33	Waukesha	2	W. H. Edwards	Rep.	Sussex
23	Waupaca		Robert M. Hanson	Rep.	Scandinavia
21	Waushara		Frank Ploetz	Rep.	Coloma
19	Winnebago	1	Clark M. Perry	Rep.	Oshkosh
19	Winnebago	2	Herman A. Porath	Rep.	Vinland
19	Winnebago	3	Eber Simpson (died Nov. 19, 1919)	Rep.	Oshkosh
24	Wood		Byron Whittingham	Rep.	Arpin

== Committees ==
=== Senate committees ===
- Senate Standing Committee on Committees – I. P. Witter, chair
- Senate Standing Committee on Contingent Expenditures – H. E. Roethe, chair
- Senate Standing Committee on Corporations – J. H. Bennett, chair
- Senate Standing Committee on Education and Public Welfare – A. J. Pullen, chair
- Senate Standing Committee on Highways – L. E. Cunningham, chair
- Senate Standing Committee on the Judiciary – T. Benfey, chair
- Senate Standing Committee on Legislative Procedure – W. T. Stevens, chair
- Senate Standing Committee on Reconstruction and Readjustment – R. P. Wilcox, chair
- Senate Standing Committee on State Affairs – W. T. Stevens, chair

=== Assembly committees ===
- Assembly Standing Committee on Agriculture – S. R. Webster, chair
- Assembly Standing Committee on Commerce and Manufactures – J. E. Johnson, chair
- Assembly Standing Committee on Contingent Expenditures – J. W. Conner, chair
- Assembly Standing Committee on Education – M. L. Hineman, chair
- Assembly Standing Committee on Elections – W. R. Chipman, chair
- Assembly Standing Committee on Engrossed Bills – E. F. Ganz, chair
- Assembly Standing Committee on Enrolled Bills – C. E. Hanson, chair
- Assembly Standing Committee on Excise and Fees – J. C. Anderson, chair
- Assembly Standing Committee on Fish and Game – H. Kandutsch, chair
- Assembly Standing Committee on Highways – J. J. Ruka, chair
- Assembly Standing Committee on Insurance and Banking – J. C. Chapple, chair
- Assembly Standing Committee on the Judiciary – T. S. Nolan, chair
- Assembly Standing Committee on Labor – J. H. Jensen, chair
- Assembly Standing Committee on Municipalities – F. N. Graass, chair
- Assembly Standing Committee on Printing – G. H. Hood, chair
- Assembly Standing Committee on Public Welfare – R. B. Melvin, chair
- Assembly Standing Committee on Revision – W. F. Dettinger, chair
- Assembly Standing Committee on Rules – J. F. Buckley, chair
- Assembly Standing Committee on State Affairs – A. Johnson, chair
- Assembly Standing Committee on Taxation – W. H. Edwards, chair
- Assembly Standing Committee on Third Reading – G. E. Ansorge, chair
- Assembly Standing Committee on Transportation – C. H. Carter, chair

=== Joint committees ===
- Joint Standing Committee on Finance – A. H. Wilkinson (Sen.) & C. Kurtenacker (Asm.), co-chairs
- Joint Special Committee on Drainage – I. P. Witter (Sen.), chair
- Joint Special Committee for the Historical Society Investigation – H. E. Roethe (Sen.), chair
- Joint Special Committee for the International Harvester Co. Investigation – J. H. Bennett (Sen.), chair
- Joint Special Committee on Legislative Visiting – E. F. Clark (Sen.), chair
- Joint Special Committee for the Milwaukee Street Railway Investigation – G. B. Skogmo (Sen.), chair
- Joint Special Committee on Pensions, Annuities, and Retirement Funds for Teachers – A. Kuckuk (Sen.), chair

== Employees ==
=== Senate employees ===
- Chief Clerk: Oliver G. Munson
  - Assistant Chief Clerk: C. E. Mullen
- Sergeant-at-Arms: John Turner
  - Assistant Sergeant-at-Arms: Olaf Goldstrand
- Postmaster: Frank C. Densmore

=== Assembly employees ===
- Chief Clerk: C. E. Shaffer
  - Journal Clerk: Charles E. Tuffley
- Sergeant-at-Arms: Thomas Grant Cretney
  - Assistant Sergeant-at-Arms: E. F. Wright
- Postmaster: J. E. Barnard
