= William A. Freehoff =

20th century American politician

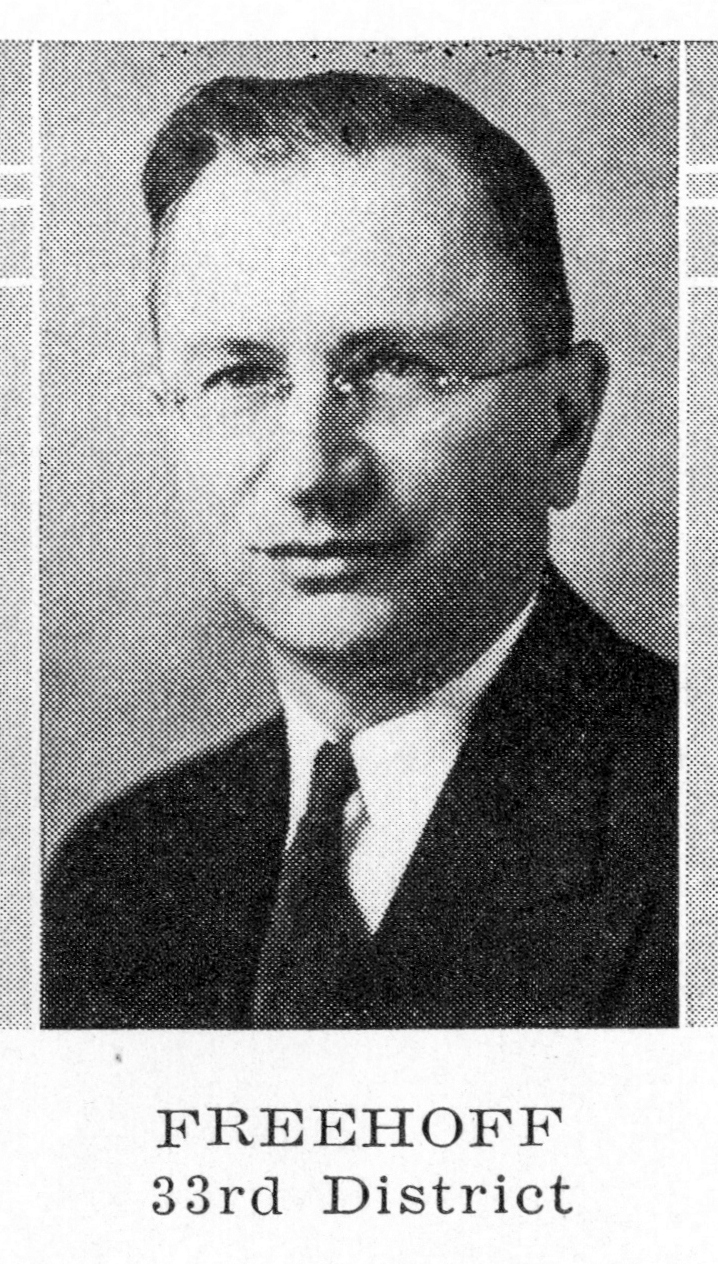

Member of the Wisconsin Senate from the 33rd district
- In office January 2, 1939 – January 6, 1947
- Preceded by: Chester Dempsey
- Succeeded by: Chester Dempsey

Member of the Wisconsin State Assembly from the Waukesha 1st district
- In office January 3, 1921 – January 5, 1925
- Preceded by: John F. Buckley
- Succeeded by: Evan G. Davies

Personal details
- Born: December 27, 1889 Greenfield, La Crosse County, Wisconsin, U.S.
- Died: January 22, 1950 (aged 60) Waukesha, Wisconsin, U.S.
- Resting place: Salem Cemetery, Wales, Wisconsin
- Party: Republican
- Spouse: Ruth Florence Williams
- Parent: Henry Freehoff (father)
- Education: University of Wisconsin
- Occupation: Farmer, insurance executive

William Adolph Freehoff (December 27, 1889 – January 22, 1950) was an American farmer, insurance executive, and Republican politician. He was a member of the Wisconsin Senate (1939–1947) and State Assembly (1921–1925), representing Waukesha County.

== Biography ==
Freehoff was born December 27, 1889, in Greenfield, La Crosse County, Wisconsin. He went on to attend the University of Wisconsin-Madison. Afterwards, he joined the school's staff. On August 15, 1916, Freehoff married Ruth Florence Williams. He died on January 22, 1950, in Waukesha, Wisconsin. His father Henry Freehoff also served in the Wisconsin Legislature.

== Political career ==
Freehoff was a member of the Assembly from 1921 to 1924. He was a Republican. In 1938, he defeated the incumbent, Democratic State Senator Chester E. Dempsey. Dempsey left the Democratic Party in 1940, and ran against Freehoff in the 1942 primary election, losing with 4,260 votes to 4,575 for Freehoff and 1020 for a third candidate. In 1946, Dempsey defeated Freehoff in the primary, with 10,075 votes to 8,798. He won the general election.

Wisconsin State Assembly
Preceded by John F. Buckley	Member of the Wisconsin State Assembly from the Waukesha 1st district January 3, 1921 – January 5, 1925	Succeeded by Evan G. Davies
Wisconsin Senate
Preceded by Chester Dempsey	Member of the Wisconsin Senate from the 33rd district January 2, 1939 – January 6, 1947	Succeeded by Chester Dempsey
