= William Lyman Smith =

20th century American politician

William L. Smith

Member of the Wisconsin Senate from the 24th district
- In office January 3, 1921 – January 7, 1929
- Preceded by: Isaac P. Witter
- Succeeded by: Walter J. Rush

Member of the Wisconsin State Assembly from the Clark County district
- In office January 1, 1917 – January 6, 1919
- Preceded by: Emery Crosby
- Succeeded by: Harry Hewett

Personal details
- Born: February 12, 1878 Sunbury County, New Brunswick, Canada
- Died: November 11, 1964 (aged 86) Neillsville, Wisconsin, U.S.
- Resting place: Neillsville City Cemetery, Neillsville
- Party: Republican
- Spouses: Olive T. Huntzicker (m. 1901; died 1937); Mary Eliza Corson (m. 1939–1964)
- Children: Herbert M. Smith^{(b. 1903; died 2005)}; William Lyman Smith II^{(b. 1905; died 1978)}
- Education: Stevens Point State Normal School

Military service
- Allegiance: United States
- Branch/service: Wisconsin National Guard
- Rank: Colonel

William Lyman Smith I (February 12, 1878 – November 11, 1964) was a Canadian American educator, businessman, and Republican politician from Neillsville, Wisconsin. He was a member of the Wisconsin Senate (1921–1928) and State Assembly (1917–1918), representing Clark County. He also served as private secretary to Wisconsin governor Walter J. Kohler Sr.

== Background ==
Smith was born February 12, 1878, on a farm in Sunbury County, New Brunswick, Canada. His parents moved to Eau Claire County, Wisconsin, in that same year. He attended public schools at Porter's Mills, graduated from Eau Claire High School, and then from Stevens Point State Normal School. He came to Neillsville in 1899, and taught school for four years. His official biography described him as being since 1903 "engaged in the telephone business" (he was manager of the Badger State Telephone Company). He served as an alderman for one term in 1906, and was president of the local public library board.

== Public office ==
Smith was elected to the Assembly in 1916 for the Clark County district to succeed fellow Republican Emery Crosby, receiving 3482 votes to 1201 for Democrat Alvin Foster. He was assigned to the legislature's joint committee on finance, serving alongside another William L. Smith, a Socialist barber from Milwaukee. Smith was not a candidate for re-election in 1918, and was succeeded by fellow Republican Harry Hewett.

In 1920, Smith was elected from the 24th State Senate district (Clark and Wood Counties) to succeed fellow Republican Isaac P. Witter, with 11,700 votes to 2,791 for Socialist Robert A. Steinbach and 1,580 for Democrat Alphonsus B. Sutor. He was assigned to the standing committee on corporations. He was re-elected in 1924 (his district now included Taylor County as well), with 13,760 votes to 7,668 for Independent T. H. Barber. He was assigned to the committees on education and public welfare, and on contingent expenditures. Smith (still "engaged in the telephone business") was elected president pro tempore of the Senate for the 1927 session. He was not a candidate for re-election in 1928, and was succeeded by fellow Neillsville Republican Walter J. Rush.

Smith later served as private secretary to Governor of Wisconsin Walter J. Kohler Sr., who appointed Smith the rank of colonel on the state national guard.

== Private life ==
On June 26, 1901, Smith had married Olive T. Huntzicker, a native of Eaton, Wisconsin. At the time of her death in 1937, they had two sons, William Lyman Jr., and Herbert. On April 1, 1939, Smith married librarian Mary Elizabeth Corson.

In 1963, a local newspaper remarked on the 86th birthday of the still-living Smith. Smith died the following year at the Memorial Hospital at Neillsville, and was buried in the Neillsville cemetery.

Wisconsin State Assembly
Preceded by Emery Crosby	Member of the Wisconsin State Assembly from the Clark County district January 1, 1917 – January 6, 1919	Succeeded by Harry Hewett
Wisconsin Senate
Preceded by Isaac P. Witter	Member of the Wisconsin Senate from the 24th district January 3, 1921 – January 7, 1929	Succeeded by Walter J. Rush
