= Coloma, Wisconsin =

- Village
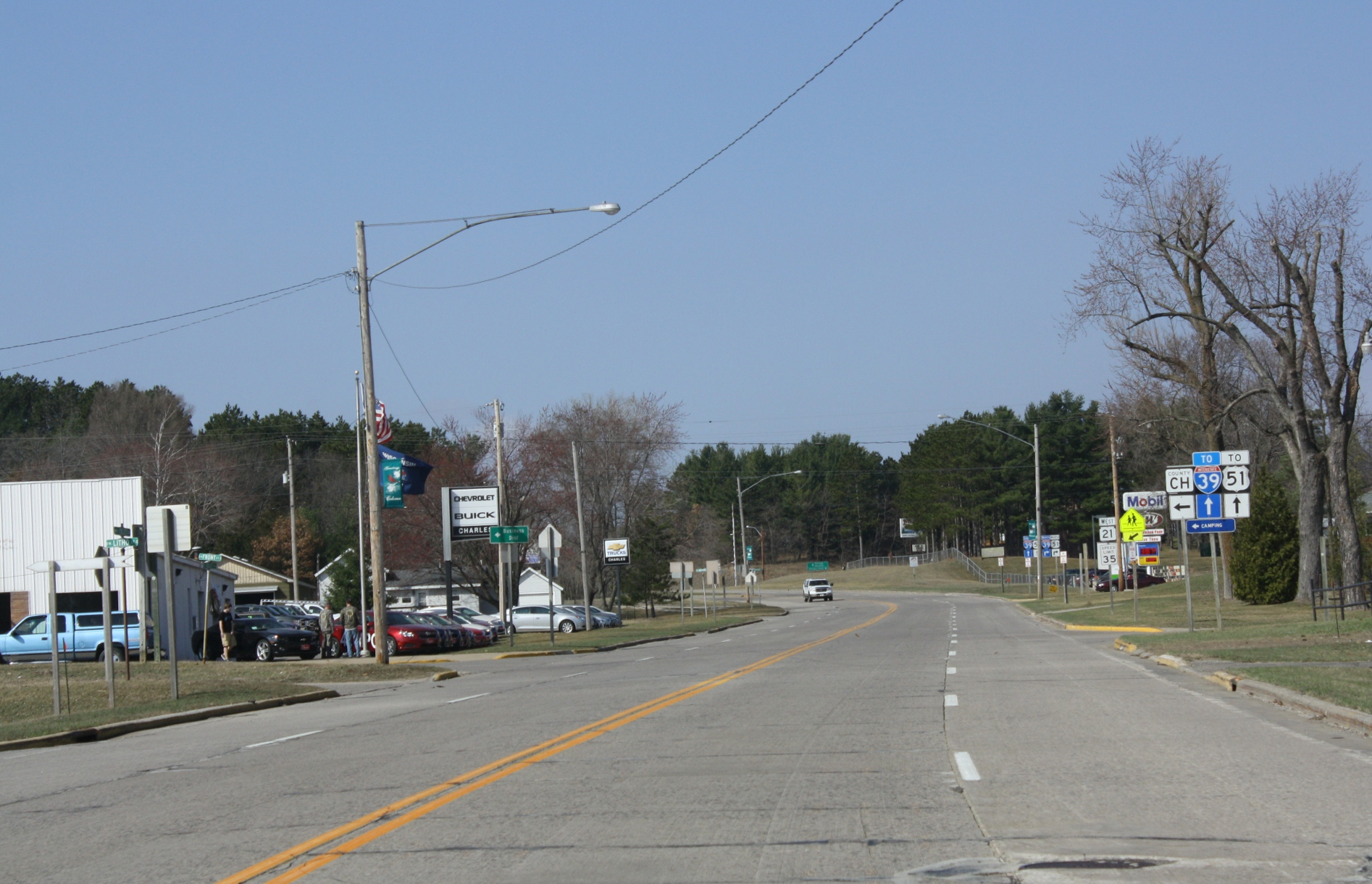
- Looking west in downtown Coloma

- Location of Coloma in Waushara County, Wisconsin.
- Coordinates: 44°1′26″N 89°32′2″W
- Country: United States
- State: Wisconsin
- County: Waushara

Area
  - Total: 1.49 sq mi (3.85 km^{2})
  - Land: 1.49 sq mi (3.85 km^{2})
  - Water: 0 sq mi (0.00 km^{2})
- Elevation: 1,106 ft (337 m)

Population (2020)
  - Total: 448
  - Density: 301/sq mi (116/km^{2})
- Time zone: UTC-6 (Central (CST))
  - Summer (DST): UTC-5 (CDT)
- zip code: 54930
- Area code: Area code 715
- FIPS code: 55-16400
- GNIS feature ID: 1583003
- Website: https://villageofcoloma.com/

Coloma is a village in Waushara County, Wisconsin, United States. The population was 448 at the 2020 census. The village is located within the Town of Coloma. Coloma is home of the annual Coloma Chicken Chew, held at the end of June.

== History ==
The Coloma area was first settled in 1849 by John Drake and a man named Stowe. Stowe stole lumber Drake left in the area when Drake had to leave due to a family illness. Stowe built a tavern with the timber, leaving Drake to build his tavern out of rough hewn logs.

By 1875, the area was known as Ross Corners, after the local postmaster. A railroad between Stevens Point and Portage was soon built, coming through four miles to the east at a spot called Coloma Station. The post office was moved from Ross Corners to Coloma Station, and Ross Corners soon became known as Coloma Corners.

== Geography ==
Coloma is located at 44°02′00″N 89°31′16″W (44.033421, -89.521077).

According to the United States Census Bureau, the village has a total area of 1.46 square miles (3.78 km^{2}), all land.

Glover Bluff crater, a meteor crater, is located approximately four miles south of Coloma.

== Demographics ==
Historical population
Census	Pop.	Note	%±
1880	74		—
1940	308		—
1950	338		9.7%
1960	312		−7.7%
1970	336		7.7%
1980	367		9.2%
1990	383		4.4%
2000	461		20.4%
2010	450		−2.4%
2020	448		−0.4%
U.S. Decennial Census

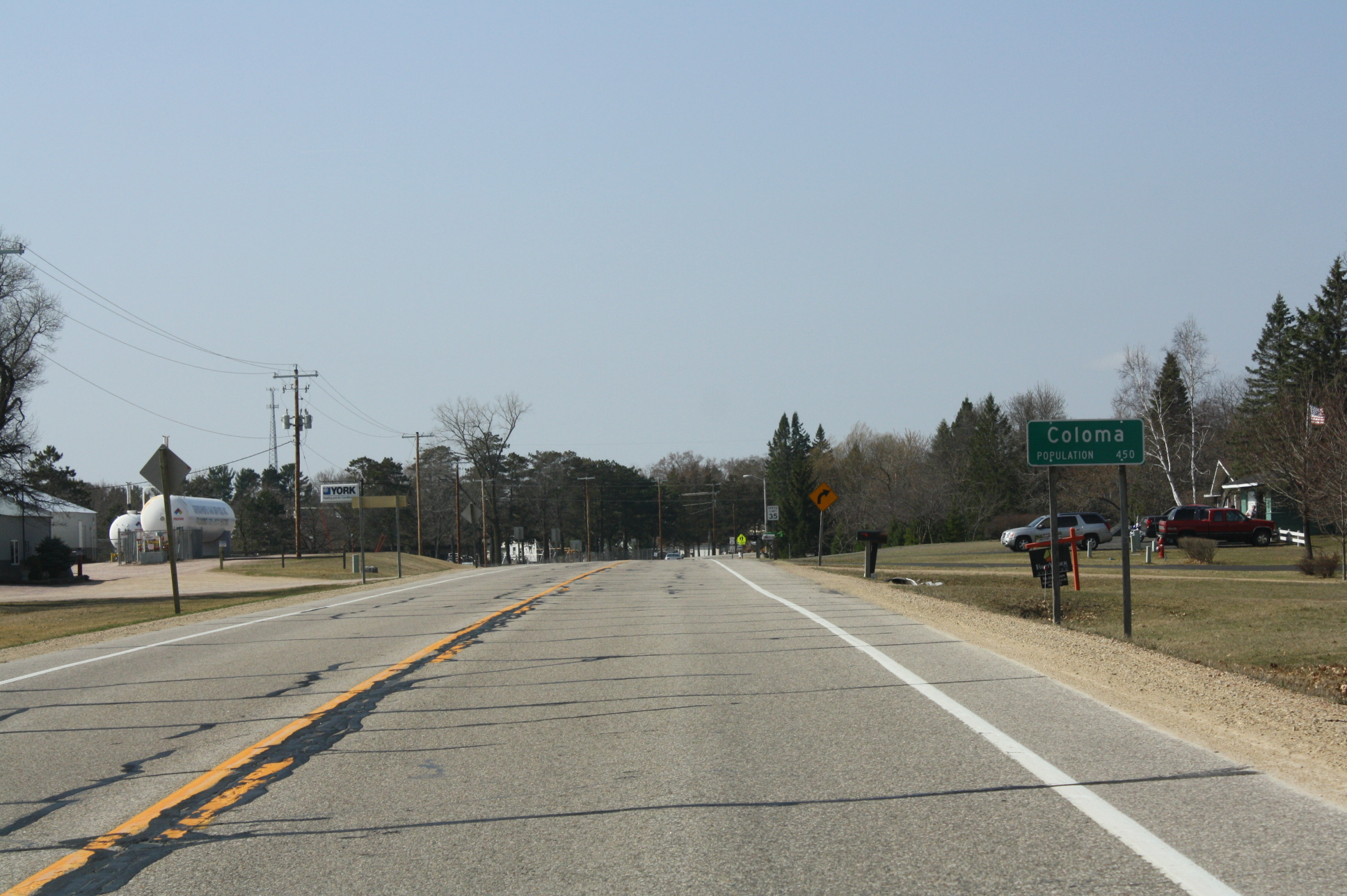
Looking west at the sign for Coloma

=== 2010 census ===
As of the census of 2010, there were 450 people, 184 households, and 120 families residing in the village. The population density was 308.2 inhabitants per square mile (119.0/km^{2}). There were 214 housing units at an average density of 146.6 per square mile (56.6/km^{2}). The racial makeup of the village was 100.0% White. Hispanic or Latino of any race were 0.9% of the population.

There were 184 households, of which 33.7% had children under the age of 18 living with them, 46.7% were married couples living together, 10.3% had a female householder with no husband present, 8.2% had a male householder with no wife present, and 34.8% were non-families. 29.3% of all households were made up of individuals, and 20.1% had someone living alone who was 65 years of age or older. The average household size was 2.45 and the average family size was 2.94.

The median age in the village was 39.6 years. 26% of residents were under the age of 18; 6.8% were between the ages of 18 and 24; 22.9% were from 25 to 44; 25.1% were from 45 to 64; and 19.1% were 65 years of age or older. The gender makeup of the village was 50.2% male and 49.8% female.

=== 2000 census ===
As of the census of 2000, there were 461 people, 185 households, and 128 families residing in the village. The population density was 433.7 people per square mile (167.9/km^{2}). There were 197 housing units at an average density of 185.3 per square mile (71.8/km^{2}). The racial makeup of the village was 99.35% White, 0.22% Pacific Islander, 0.22% from other races, and 0.22% from two or more races. 3.04% of the population were Hispanic or Latino of any race.

There were 185 households, out of which 31.9% had children under the age of 18 living with them, 56.8% were married couples living together, 8.1% had a female householder with no husband present, and 30.8% were non-families. 27.6% of all households were made up of individuals, and 15.7% had someone living alone who was 65 years of age or older. The average household size was 2.42 and the average family size was 2.95.

In the village, the population was spread out, with 24.1% under the age of 18, 6.9% from 18 to 24, 27.1% from 25 to 44, 21.3% from 45 to 64, and 20.6% who were 65 years of age or older. The median age was 39 years. For every 100 females, there were 102.2 males. For every 100 females age 18 and over, there were 96.6 males.

The median income for a household in the village was $33,295, and the median income for a family was $38,542. Males had a median income of $30,350 versus $18,214 for females. The per capita income for the village was $14,766. About 11.9% of families and 16.7% of the population were below the poverty line, including 24.5% of those under age 18 and 18.2% of those age 65 or over.

== Notable people ==
- Hellen M. Brooks, educator and Wisconsin State Representative, lived in Coloma.
- Thomas Fearne, farmer and Wisconsin State Senator, lived in Coloma.
- Frank Ploetz, farmer, businessman, and Wisconsin State Representative, lived in Coloma.
- Hiram W. Roblier, Wisconsin State Representative, lived in Coloma.

== Images ==
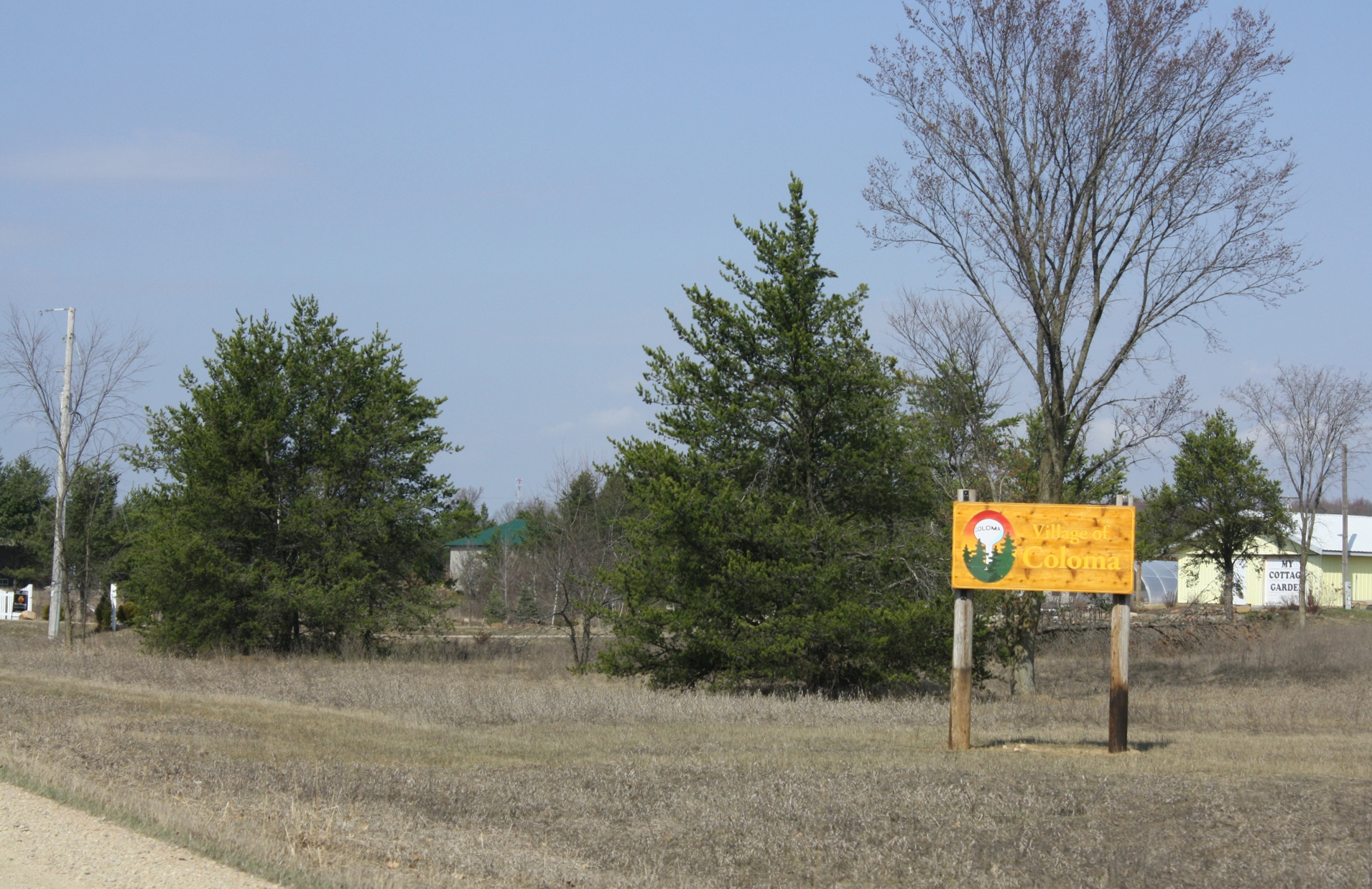
Welcome sign

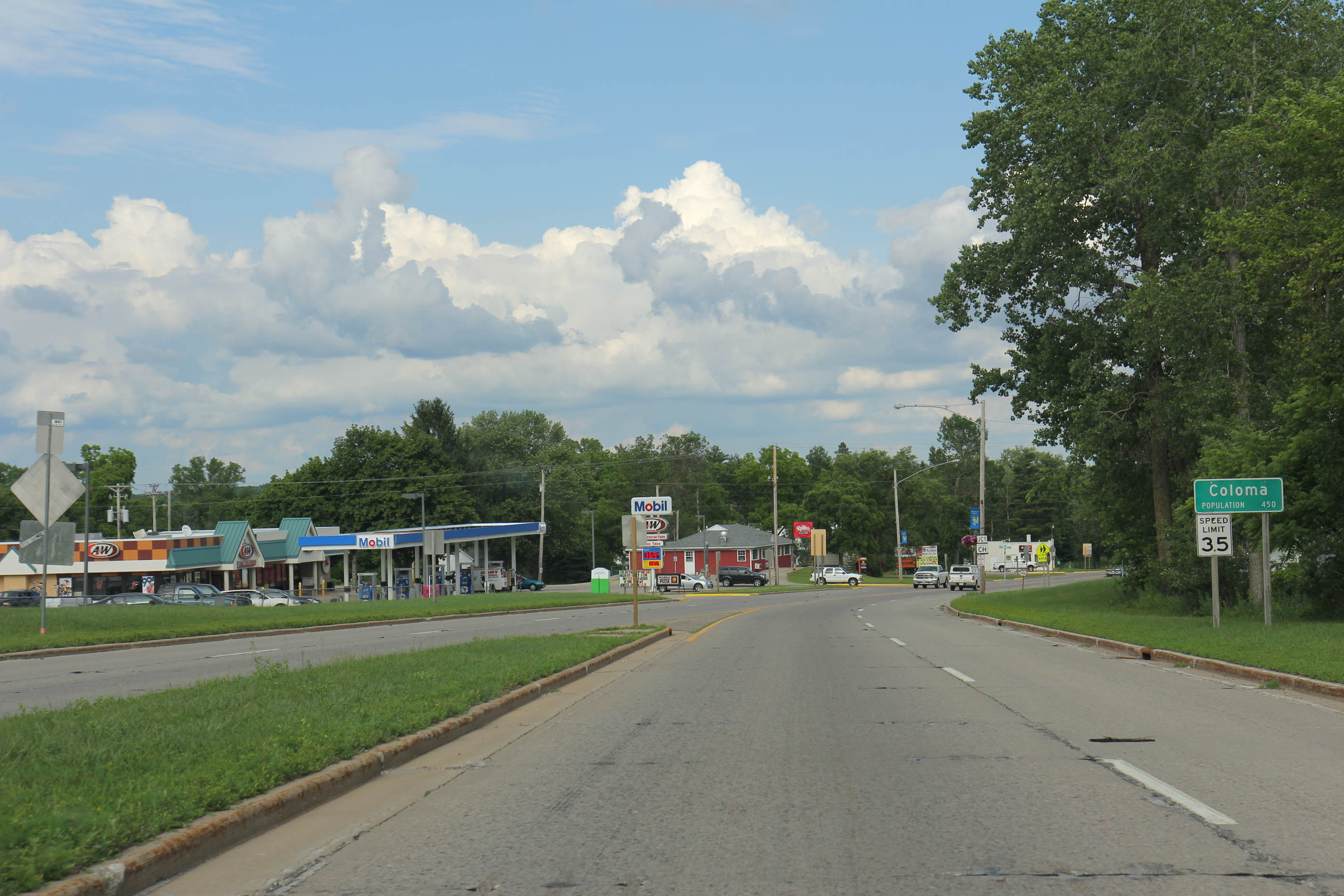
Looking east at the sign for Coloma
