= Greenfield, Wisconsin (disambiguation) =

Greenfield is the name of some places in the U.S. state of Wisconsin:

- Greenfield, Wisconsin, a city in Milwaukee County
- Greenfield, La Crosse County, Wisconsin, a town
- Greenfield, Monroe County, Wisconsin, a town
- Greenfield, Sauk County, Wisconsin, a town
