= James Pederson =

James Pederson could refer to:

- Jim Pederson (American football) (1907–1978), American football player
- Jim Pederson (businessman and politician) (born 1942), American businessman and former chair of the Arizona Democratic Party

== See also ==
- James Pedersen (1868–1944), American businessman and politician
