= Ploetz =

Ploetz, Plötz or Plotz is a surname. Notable people with the surname include:

- Alfred Ploetz (1860–1940), German physician, biologist and eugenicist
- Carl Plötz (1814–1886), German entomologist
- David Plotz (born 1970), American journalist
- Ella Sachs Plotz (1888–1922), American philanthropist
- Frank Ploetz (1870–1944), American farmer and politician
- Hans-Joachim Plötz (born 1944), German tennis player
- Karl Ploetz (1819–1881), German author
- Richard Plotz (born 1948), American mythopoeist
- Yvonne Ploetz (born 1984), German politician

== See also ==
- Plötz, a municipality in the Saalekreis district, Saxony-Anhalt, Germany
- Senta Trömel-Plötz (born 1939), German linguist
