= Ira E. Smith =

American politician

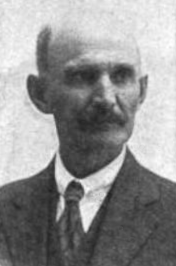

Member of the Wisconsin State Assembly
- In office 1919

Personal details
- Born: Ira Ellsworth Smith; July 7, 1864 Burnett, Wisconsin, US
- Died: March 21, 1948 (aged 83) Cassian, Wisconsin, US
- Party: Republican
- Spouse: Minnie D. Pettis (m. 1889)
- Children: 3

Ira Ellsworth Smith (July 7, 1864 – March 21, 1948) was a member of the Wisconsin State Assembly.

== Biography ==
Smith was born on July 7, 1864, in Burnett, Wisconsin, the son of Ira James Smith (1838–1911) and Harriet Ann Lawrence Smith (1835–1898). On September 25, 1889, Smith married Minnie D. Pettis (1865–1945). They had three children. Smith died in Cassian, Wisconsin, on March 21, 1948, following a heart attack three days earlier.

== Career ==
Smith was elected to the Assembly in 1918 as a Republican. Other positions he served in include chairman (similar to mayor) and assessor of Cassian, Wisconsin, treasurer of the school board, chairman of the County Board of Oneida County, Wisconsin, and a supervisor of Eau Galle, Dunn County, Wisconsin.
