= Emery Crosby =

American politician

Emery Crosby (December 29, 1874 in Sheboygan Falls, Wisconsin – May 23, 1947 in Neillsville, Wisconsin) was a member of the Wisconsin State Assembly. He attended high school in Glenbeulah, Wisconsin before attending the University of Wisconsin-Oshkosh and Northwestern University. Crosby's grandfather, James Little, was also a member of the Assembly.

In June 1901, Crosby married Rosa M. Beck.

== Career ==
Crosby was elected to the Assembly in 1914. Additionally, he was a member of the Clark County, Wisconsin Board, District Attorney of Clark County and a judge on the Wisconsin Circuit Court. He was succeeded by William Lyman Smith. Crosby was a Republican.
