= Harry Doxtader =

American politician

Harry Doxtader was a member of the Wisconsin State Assembly.

== Biography ==
Doxtader was born on November 3, 1827, in Oppenheim, New York. Later, he lived in Iron Ridge, Wisconsin, for a time before settling in Tomah (town), Wisconsin, in 1861. He died in 1907.

== Career ==
Doxtader was a member of the Assembly during the 1877 session. Additionally, he was Chairman of the Board of Tomah in 1876 and Assessor of Tomah in 1875. He was a Republican.
