= Chester Dempsey =

American farmer and politician

Chester E. Dempsey (July 20, 1896 – October 4, 1969) was an American farmer and politician.

Born in the town of Merton, Wisconsin, Dempsey owned and operated a dairy farm. He served on the Waukesha County, Wisconsin Board of Supervisors and in town government. He served in the Wisconsin State Senate as a Democrat from 1935 to 1939, but was defeated in 1938 by Republican William A. Freehoff.

He left the Democratic Party in 1940, stating that he was against a third term for President Franklin D. Roosevelt and that as a farmer, "The Republican party is the only party left for me to join."

He ran against Freehoff in the 1942 primary election, losing with 4,260 votes to 4,575 for Freehoff and 1020 for a third candidate. In 1946, he defeated Freehoff in the primary, with 10,075 votes to 8,798. He won the general election, and would serve as a Republican from 1947 until his death on October 4, 1969. He was succeeded by fellow Republican Roger P. Murphy.
