= H. Albert Wrucke =

American politician

H. Albert Wrucke (March 1, 1868 – April 1, 1953) was an American politician and businessman.

Born near Iron Ridge, Wisconsin, Wrucke taught school and was principal of the Campbellsport, Wisconsin school. He also worked for a bank and insurance company. Wrucke was the first village clerk of Campbellsport, Wisconsin. He was also justice of the peace and served on the school board as director and clerk. Wrucke served on the Fond du Lac County, Wisconsin Board of Supervisors and was a Republican. In 1931, Wrucke served in the Wisconsin State Assembly, representing the second district of Fond du Lac County. Wrucke died of a stroke at his home in Campbellsport, Wisconsin.
