= Henry Freehoff =

American politician

Henry Freehoff (February 2, 1861 – May 28, 1923) was an American farmer and politician.

Born in the town of Greenfield, La Crosse County, Wisconsin, Freehoff was a farmer. He served as Greenfield town clerk and town board chairman. He also served as La Crosse County treasurer and was president of the Shelby Mutual Fire Insurance Company. In 1915 and 1917, Freehoff served in the Wisconsin State Assembly and was a Republican. Freehoff died at his home in the town of Greenfield. His son William A. Freehoff also served in the Wisconsin Legislature.
