= Goodnow, Wisconsin =

- Unincorporated community
- Location within Wisconsin Location within the United States
- Coordinates: 45°41′50″N 89°40′19″W
- Country: United States
- State: Wisconsin
- County: Oneida
- Elevation: 1,519 ft (463 m)
- Time zone: UTC-6 (Central (CST))
  - Summer (DST): UTC-5 (CDT)
- Area codes: 715 & 534
- GNIS feature ID: 1577617

Goodnow is an unincorporated community located in the town of Cassian, Oneida County, Wisconsin, United States. Goodnow is located on Bearskin Creek and the Bearskin State Trail, 13 miles (21 km) west-northwest of Rhinelander.

Pinewood Air Park (WS39) airport with a private-use turf runway is located in Goodnow.
