= Roman Bentz =

American football player (1919–1996)

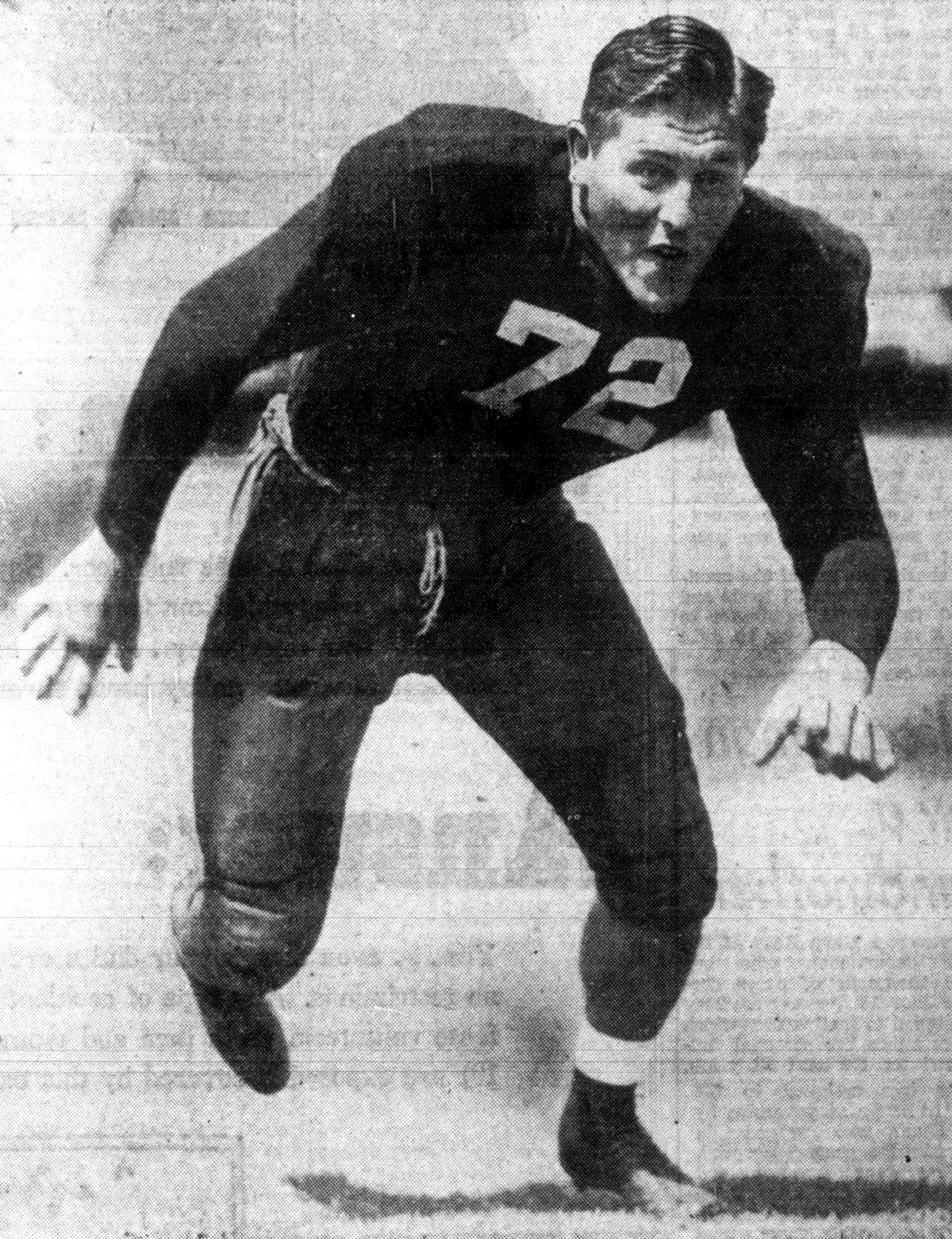
- Bentz, circa 1942

No. 45, 33, 46
- Positions: Guard; Tackle

Personal information
- Born: September 1, 1919; Iron Ridge, Wisconsin, U.S.
- Died: June 24, 1996 (aged 76); Tomahawk, Wisconsin, U.S.
- Listed height: 6 ft 2 in (1.88 m)
- Listed weight: 230 lb (104 kg)

Career information
- College: Tulane (1939-1942)
- NFL draft: 1943: 25th round, 240th overall pick

Career history
- New York Yankees (1946–1948); San Francisco 49ers (1948)

Career AAFC statistics
- Games played: 34
- Games started: 19
- Stats at Pro Football Reference

Roman Walter Bentz (September 1, 1919 – June 24, 1996) was an American football Guard and tackle in the All-America Football Conference (AAFC) for the New York Yankees and San Francisco 49ers. He played college football at Tulane University and was drafted in the 25th round of the 1943 NFL draft by the Washington Redskins.

In 1949 Bentz became a rookie umpire in the Pacific Coast League.
