= James Little (American politician) =

American politician

James Little was a member of the Wisconsin State Assembly in 1859. His grandson, Emery Crosby, was also a member of the Assembly.
