= Eber Simpson (politician) =

20th century American politician

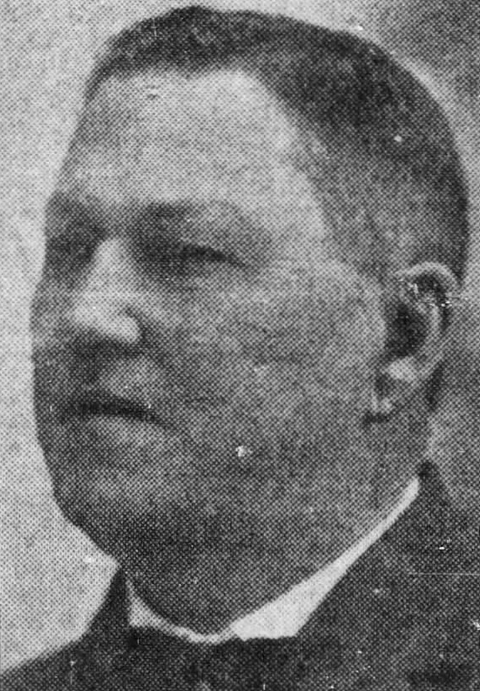

Member of the Wisconsin State Assembly from the Winnebago 3rd district
- In office January 6, 1919 – November 19, 1919 (died)
- Preceded by: Charles F. Hart
- Succeeded by: George H. Jones

Sheriff of Winnebago County, Wisconsin
- In office January 1, 1905 – January 1, 1907
- Preceded by: Madison J. Rounds
- Succeeded by: J. G. Rhyner

Personal details
- Born: August 8, 1863 Ellenburg, New York, U.S.
- Died: November 19, 1919 (aged 56) Oshkosh, Wisconsin, U.S.
- Resting place: Riverside Cemetery, Oshkosh
- Party: Republican
- Spouse: Meta Louise Sarau (m. 1889–1919)
- Children: Metha Ruby Louise (Mucks)^{(b. 1890; died 1967)}; George Lane Simpson^{(b. 1891; died 1963)}; Florence (Callies)^{(b. 1893; died 1968)}; Eber Edward Simpson^{(b. 1895; died 1964)}; Jeanette (Mondl)^{(b. 1897; died 1962)}
- Relatives: Arlie Mucks (son-in-law)

Eber Lane Simpson (August 8, 1863 – November 19, 1919) was an American businessman and Republican politician from Oshkosh, Wisconsin. He was a member of the Wisconsin State Assembly, representing Winnebago County during the 1919 session. He also served two years as sheriff.

== Biography ==
Born in Ellenburg, New York, Simpson moved with his parents to Eureka, Winnebago County, Wisconsin. He worked on farms, grocery stores, lumber mills, and the Oshkosh Fire Department. Simpson served on the Oshkosh, Wisconsin, Common Council from 1896 to 1904 and was sheriff of Winnebago County. Simpson was a Republican. In 1919, Simpson served in the Wisconsin State Assembly and then died suddenly while still in office.

Wisconsin State Assembly
Preceded by Charles F. Hart	Member of the Wisconsin State Assembly from the Winnebago 3rd district January 6, 1919 – November 19, 1919 (died)	Succeeded by George H. Jones
Legal offices
Preceded by Madison J. Rounds	Sheriff of Winnebago County, Wisconsin; January 1, 1905 – January 1, 1907	Succeeded by J. G. Rhyner
