= St. Joseph, La Crosse County, Wisconsin =

Census-designated place in Wisconsin, United States

St. Joseph, Wisconsin
- Census-designated place
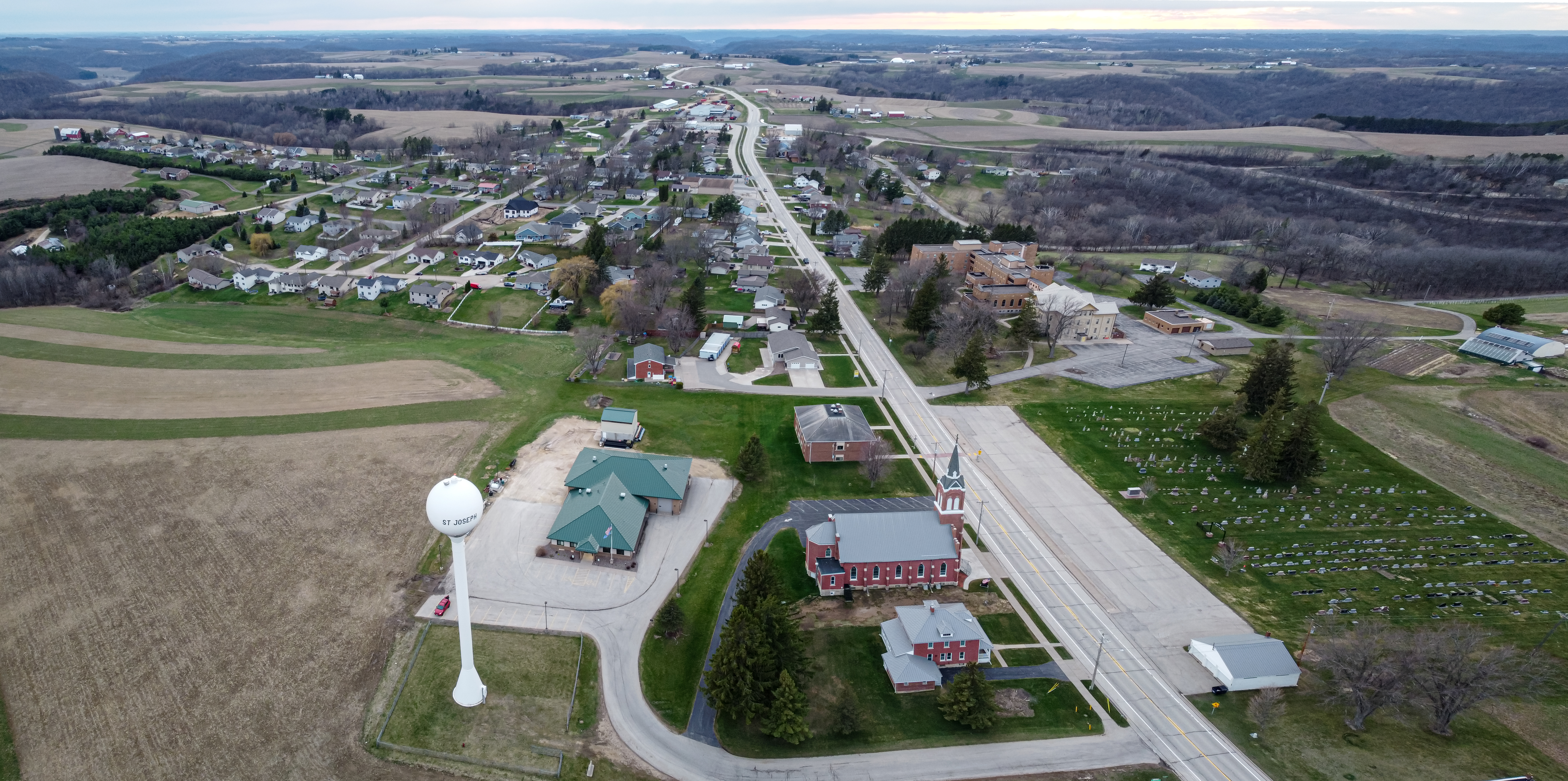
- Greenfield town hall and water tower in foreground

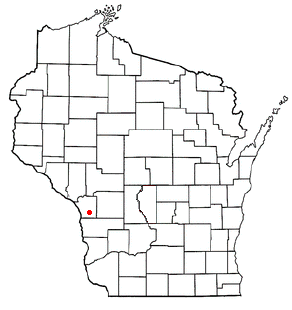
- Location of St. Joseph, Wisconsin
- Coordinates: 43°47′08″N 91°02′30″W
- Country: United States
- State: Wisconsin
- County: La Crosse
- Town: Greenfield

Area
  - Total: 1.896 sq mi (4.91 km^{2})
  - Land: 1.896 sq mi (4.91 km^{2})
  - Water: 0 sq mi (0 km^{2})
- Elevation: 1,299 ft (396 m)

Population (2010)
  - Total: 503
  - Density: 265/sq mi (102/km^{2})
- Time zone: UTC-6 (Central (CST))
  - Summer (DST): UTC-5 (CDT)
- ZIP Code: 54601 (La Crosse)
- Area code: 608
- GNIS feature ID: 1573142
- FIPS code: 55-70800

St. Joseph is an unincorporated community and census-designated place (CDP) in the town of Greenfield, La Crosse County, Wisconsin, United States. It is part of the La Crosse Metropolitan Statistical Area. The community is located at the junction of State Highway 33 and county trunk highway M. As of the 2010 census, its population was 503.

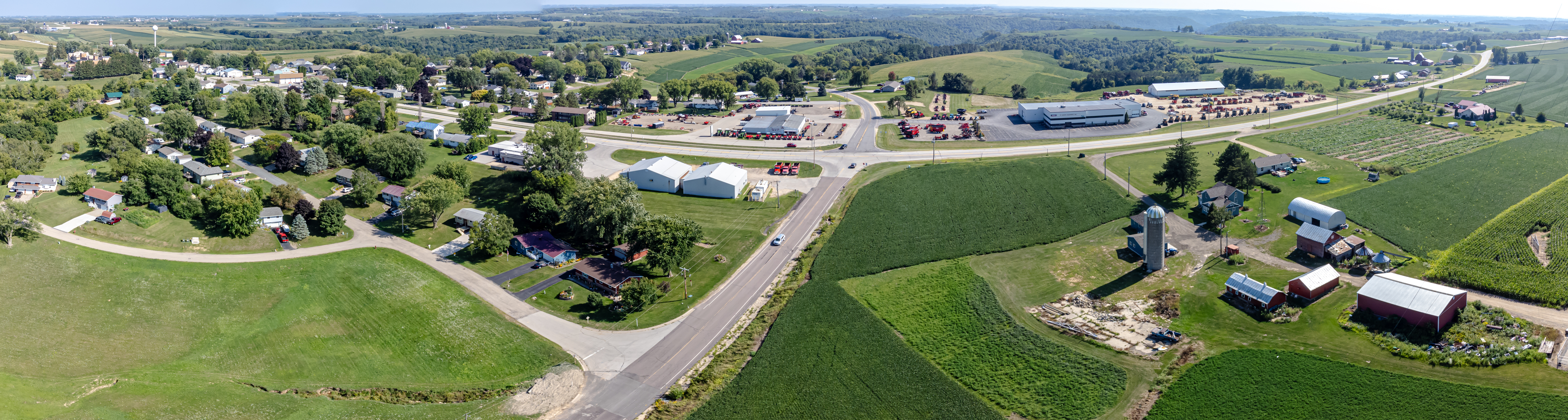
St. Joseph, Wisconsin
Highway 33 and County M Junction

== Geography ==
St. Joseph is in southern La Crosse County, in the northeastern part of the town of Greenfield. It is bordered to the west by the town of Washington. It is the only named community in the town of Greenfield. Via State Highway 33, it is 12 miles (19 km) east-southeast of La Crosse and 17 miles (27 km) west-northwest of Cashton.

According to the U.S. Census Bureau, the St. Joseph CDP has an area of 1.9 square miles (4.9 km^{2}), all land, comprising the actual settlement of St. Joseph plus surrounding rural land. The community sits atop St. Joseph Ridge at an elevation of 1,300 feet (400 m), or 400 feet (120 m) above the surrounding valleys. To the north, St. Joseph Coulee leads to Bostwick Creek, a west-flowing tributary of the La Crosse River, which joins the Mississippi at La Crosse. To the south, tributaries run to Mormon Creek, which flows west directly to the Mississippi south of La Crosse.

== Economy ==
The Franciscan Sisters of Perpetual Adoration have their retirement home in St. Joseph.

== Notable people ==
- Roman Catholic Bishop George Albert Hammes was born in St. Joseph.
