= Thomas S. Nolan =

American lawyer and politician (1856–1944)

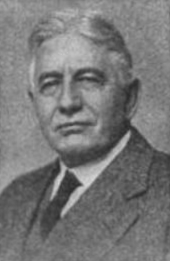

Member of the Wisconsin State Assembly
- In office 1919

Personal details
- Born: October 11, 1856 Janesville, Wisconsin, US
- Died: December 24, 1944 (aged 88) Madison, Wisconsin, US
- Party: Republican
- Occupation: Lawyer, politician

Thomas S. Nolan (October 11, 1856 – December 24, 1944) was an American lawyer and politician.

== Biography ==
Born in Janesville, Wisconsin, Nolan was educated at Ridgetown, Ontario Academy. Nolan practiced law in Janesville, Wisconsin and was a Republican. He served as president of the Janesville Police and Fire Commission. In 1919, Nolan served in the Wisconsin State Assembly.

Nolan died in Madison on December 24, 1944.
