= Anthony M. McClone =

American politician

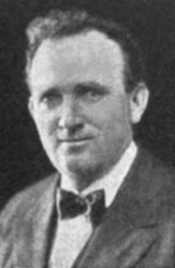

Member of the Wisconsin State Assembly
- In office 1919

Personal details
- Born: January 6, 1876 Deer Creek, Wisconsin, US
- Died: July 4, 1938 (aged 62) Appleton, Wisconsin, US
- Party: Republican
- Occupation: Businessman, politician

Anthony M. McClone (January 6, 1876 – July 4, 1938) was an American politician and businessman.

== Early life and career ==
Born in the town of Deer Creek, Outagamie County, Wisconsin, McClone grew up on the family farme worked at Chelsea Lumber Company and then purchased a farm. He served on the town board and was chairman of the board at some point.

In 1919, McClone served in the Wisconsin State Assembly as a Republican. In 1931, McClone moved to Appleton, Wisconsin and was a salesman for Four Wheel Drive Company. McClone died in Appleton after a long illness.
