= Glover Bluff crater =

Impact crater

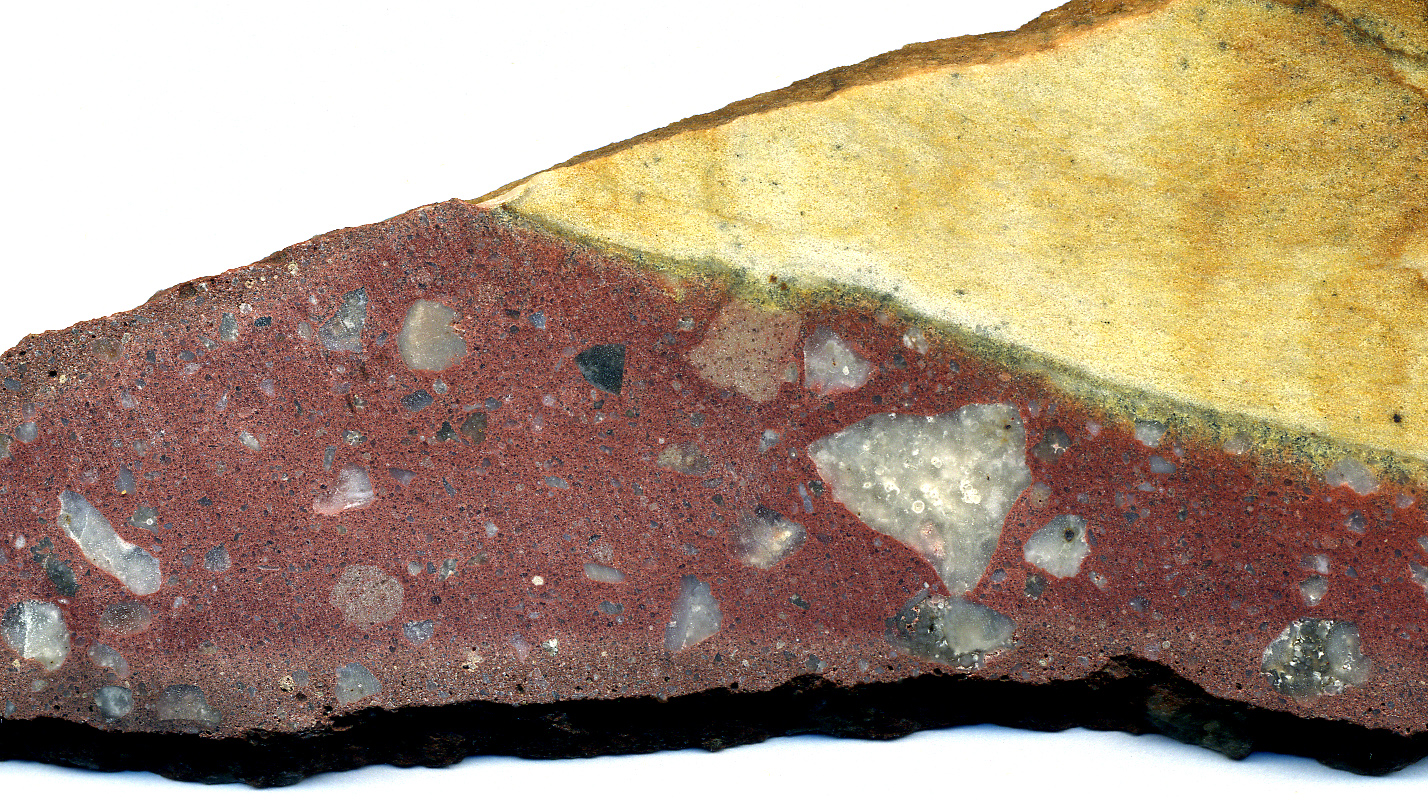
- Impact Breccia from the Glover Bluff crater.

- Location within North America Location within Wisconsin
- Location: Wisconsin, United States; 43°58′43″N 89°32′08″W

Impact crater structure
- Diameter: 8 kilometres (5.0 mi)
- Age: Less than 485 mya (Ordovician or younger)

The Glover Buff crater is an impact crater located in Wisconsin, United States. It has a diameter of about 8 kilometres (5.0 miles) and is partially exposed, however it has eroded significantly. Shatter cones are associated with this impact structure. As the target rocks impacted are sandstone and dolomite of Cambrian and Ordovician in age, it must be at least as young as the Ordovician, though the age of the impact is otherwise unconstrained. It is an understudied crater, being one of the least studied impact structures. The crater is near the east end of a prominent west-trending positive magnetic anomaly and near a Bouguer gravity anomaly.
