= Levi Withee Gibson =

American politician

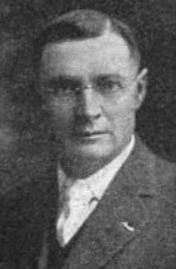

Member of the Wisconsin State Assembly
- In office 1919

Personal details
- Born: May 31, 1872 La Crosse, Wisconsin, US
- Died: May 1, 1919 (aged 46) Madison, Wisconsin, US
- Party: Republican
- Occupation: Businessman, politician

Levi Withee "L. W." Gibson (May 31, 1872 – May 1, 1919) was an American businessman and politician.

== Biography ==
Born in La Crosse, Wisconsin, Gibson was educated in the public schools, went to Lawrence University, and then lived in Medford, Wisconsin. He was president of Jos. Gibson Company which dealt with lumber and logging. Gibson was also president of the First National Bank of Medford. In 1919, Gibson served in the Wisconsin State Assembly and was a Republican. In May 1919, Gibson died suddenly of a heart attack, at age 46, while reading a newspaper in his room in Madison, Wisconsin.
