= Burns, Wisconsin =

- Town
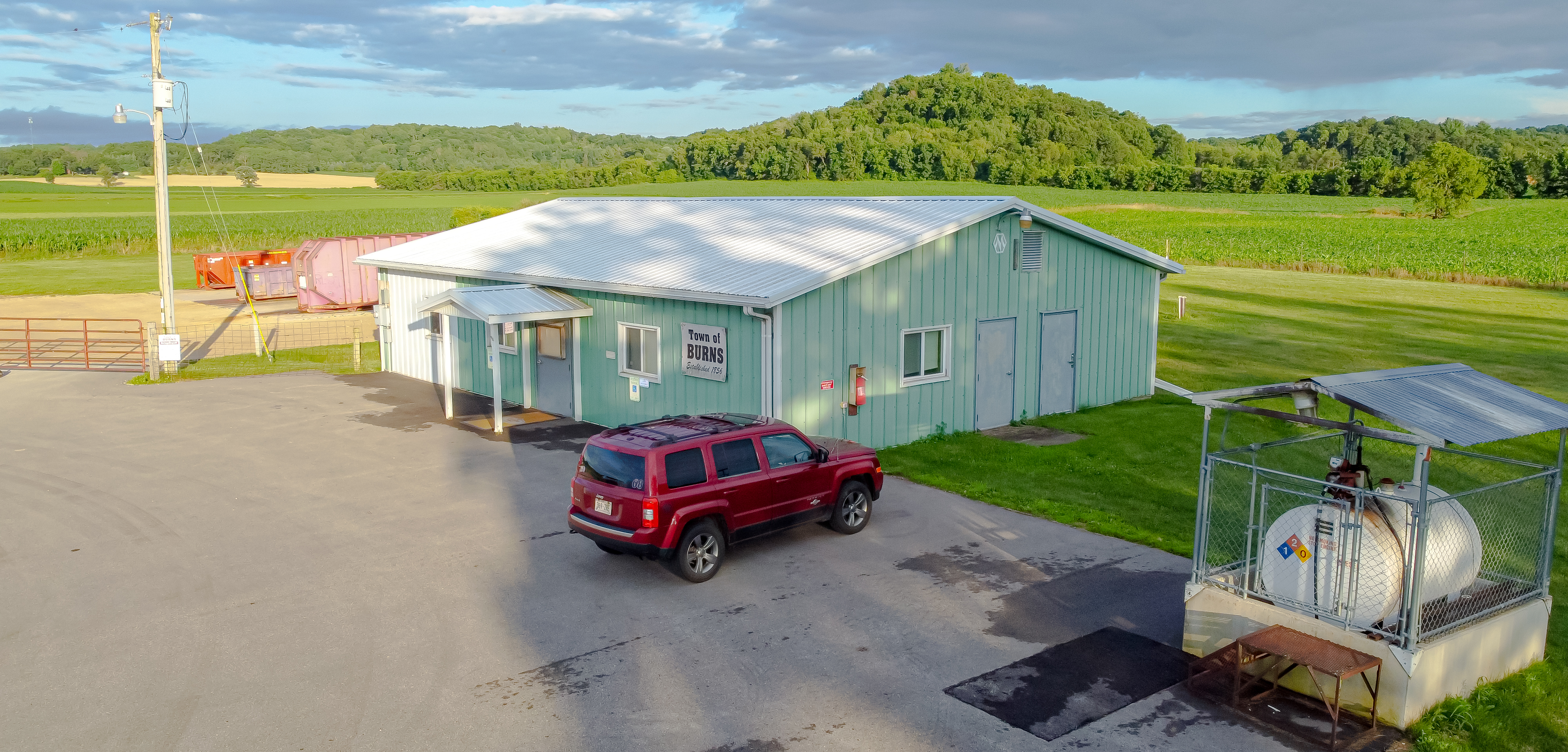
- Town hall

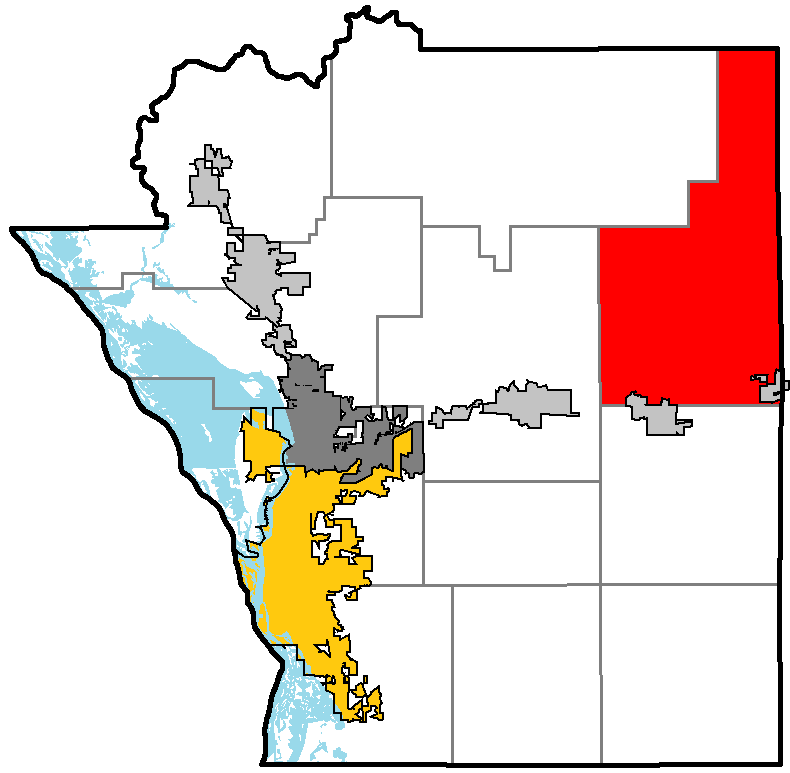
- Location of Burns, La Crosse County

- Location of La Crosse County, Wisconsin
- Coordinates: 43°57′8″N 90°57′59″W
- Country: United States
- State: Wisconsin
- County: La Crosse

Area
  - Total: 48.3 sq mi (125.2 km^{2})
  - Land: 48.3 sq mi (125.2 km^{2})
  - Water: 0.039 sq mi (0.1 km^{2})
- Elevation: 801 ft (244 m)

Population (2020)
  - Total: 946
  - Density: 19.6/sq mi (7.56/km^{2})
- Time zone: UTC-6 (Central (CST))
  - Summer (DST): UTC-5 (CDT)
- Area code: 608
- FIPS code: 55-11300
- GNIS feature ID: 1582891
- Website: https://www.townofburnswi.com/

Burns is a town in La Crosse County, Wisconsin, United States. The population was 946 at the 2020 census. It is part of the La Crosse, Wisconsin Metropolitan Statistical Area. The unincorporated communities of Burns and Burns Corners are located in the town.

== History ==
The community was named after Timothy Burns, a member of the Wisconsin Assembly and the third Lieutenant Governor of Wisconsin, who played a part in promoting the area.

== Geography ==
According to the United States Census Bureau, the unincorporated township has a total area of 48.4 square miles (125.3 km^{2}), of which 48.3 square miles (125.2 km^{2}) is land and 0.04 square mile (0.1 km^{2}) (0.04%) is water.

== Demographics ==
Historical population
Year	Pop.	±%
1980	984	—
1990	977	−0.7%
2000	979	+0.2%
2010	949	−3.1%

As of the census of 2000, there were 979 people, 349 households, and 276 families residing in the town. The population density was 20.3 people per square mile (7.8/km^{2}). There were 367 housing units at an average density of 7.6 per square mile (2.9/km^{2}). The racial makeup of the town was 98.37% White, 0.10% Native American, 0.92% Asian, and 0.61% from two or more races. Hispanic or Latino of any race were 0.10% of the population.

There were 349 households, out of which 34.1% had children under the age of 18 living with them, 67.0% were married couples living together, 5.4% had a female householder with no husband present, and 20.9% were non-families. 15.5% of all households were made up of individuals, and 5.2% had someone living alone who was 65 years of age or older. The average household size was 2.81 and the average family size was 3.09.

In the town, the population was spread out, with 27.5% under the age of 18, 7.2% from 18 to 24, 28.4% from 25 to 44, 26.1% from 45 to 64, and 10.8% who were 65 years of age or older. The median age was 37 years. For every 100 females, there were 116.6 males. For every 100 females age 18 and over, there were 111.9 males.

The median income for a household in the town was $41,620, and the median income for a family was $44,375. Males had a median income of $29,000 versus $21,797 for females. The per capita income for the town was $16,947. About 6.2% of families and 6.3% of the population were below the poverty line, including 5.6% of those under age 18 and 11.1% of those age 65 or over.

== Notable people ==
- John Bradley, Wisconsin State Representative, lived in the town; was a town supervisor
- Orrin Fletcher, Wisconsin State Representative, was born in the town; Fletcher served as chairman of the Burns Town Board
- David Vaughan, Wisconsin State Representative, lived in the town; served as justice of the peace
