= Deer Creek, Outagamie County, Wisconsin =

Deer Creek, Wisconsin
- Town
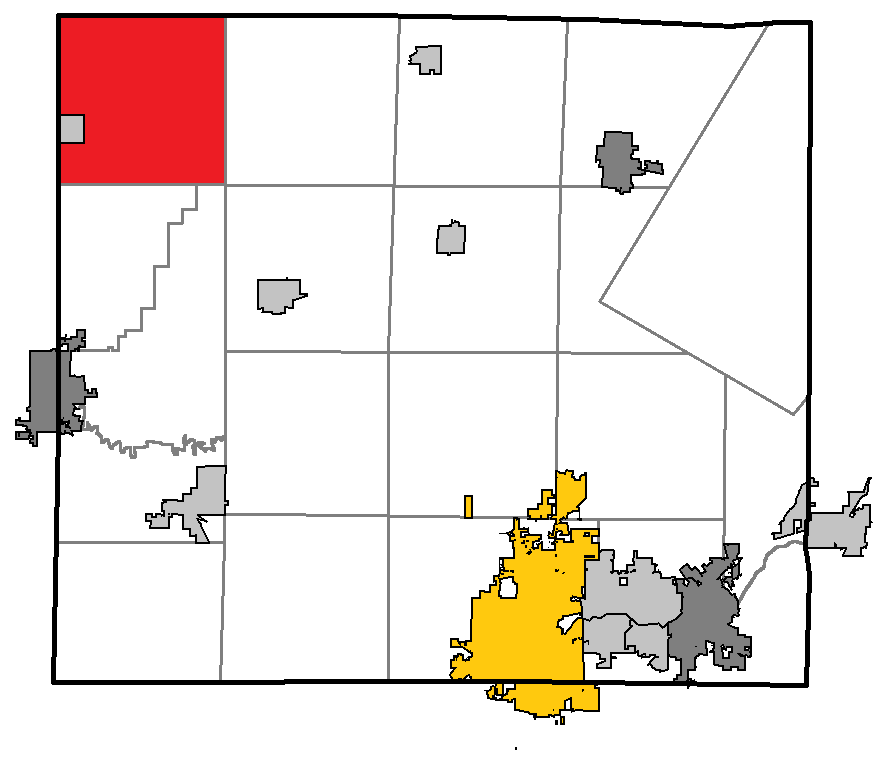
- Location of Deer Creek, within Outagamie County Map
- Coordinates: 44°32′3″N 88°41′8″W
- Country: United States
- State: Wisconsin
- County: Outagamie

Area
  - Total: 35.5 sq mi (92.0 km^{2})
  - Land: 35.5 sq mi (91.9 km^{2})
  - Water: 0.039 sq mi (0.1 km^{2})
- Elevation: 774 ft (236 m)

Population (2020)
  - Total: 630
  - Density: 18/sq mi (6.9/km^{2})
- Time zone: UTC-6 (Central (CST))
  - Summer (DST): UTC-5 (CDT)
- FIPS code: 55-19200
- GNIS feature ID: 1583058
- Website: https://townofdeercreek.com/

Deer Creek is a town in Outagamie County, Wisconsin, United States. The population was 630 at the 2020 census.

== Geography ==
According to the United States Census Bureau, the town has a total area of 35.5 square miles (92.0 km^{2}), of which 35.5 square miles (91.9 km^{2}) is land and 0.04 square mile (0.1 km^{2}) (0.06%) is water.

Deer Creek Wildlife Area is located nearby, and is approximately 1,500 acres in size, with uplands of fine sand, and a peat bog.

== Demographics ==
As of the census of 2020, there were 677 people and 284 households residing in the town. The population density was 23.7 people per square mile. The racial makeup of the town was 94.5% White, 0.3% Asian, 1.7% from other races, and 3.1% from two or more races. Hispanic or Latino of any race were 3.3% of the population.

Based on the 2023 American Community Survey data, the population was spread out, with 26% under the age of 19, 19% from 20 to 39, 31% from 40-59, and 23% over 60. The median age was 42.6 years. For every 100 females, there were 106 males.

There were 284 households, 79% were married couples living together, 6% had a female householder with no partner present, 8% had a male householder with no partner present, and 8% were non-families. The average household size was 2.9.

The median income for a household in the town was $87,500, while the per capita income for the town was $36,428. About 8.8% of people were below the poverty line, including 17.0% of those under age 18 and 3% of those age 65 or over.

82.4% of the population had a higher school degree or more, with around 10% having a bachelor's degree or more. 5% of the population was foreign-born, and around 5% of the population had veteran status.

== Government ==
As of July 2025, the town board is composed of Steve Young as Chairman, Matt Wagenson and Chad Mares as Supervisors, Amber Poppe as Treasurer, and Craig Sorenson as Clerk; all of the board was (re-)elected in April 2025.

== Notable people ==
- Anthony M. McClone, Wisconsin State Representative, was born in the town
