= Iron Ridge, Wisconsin =

- Village
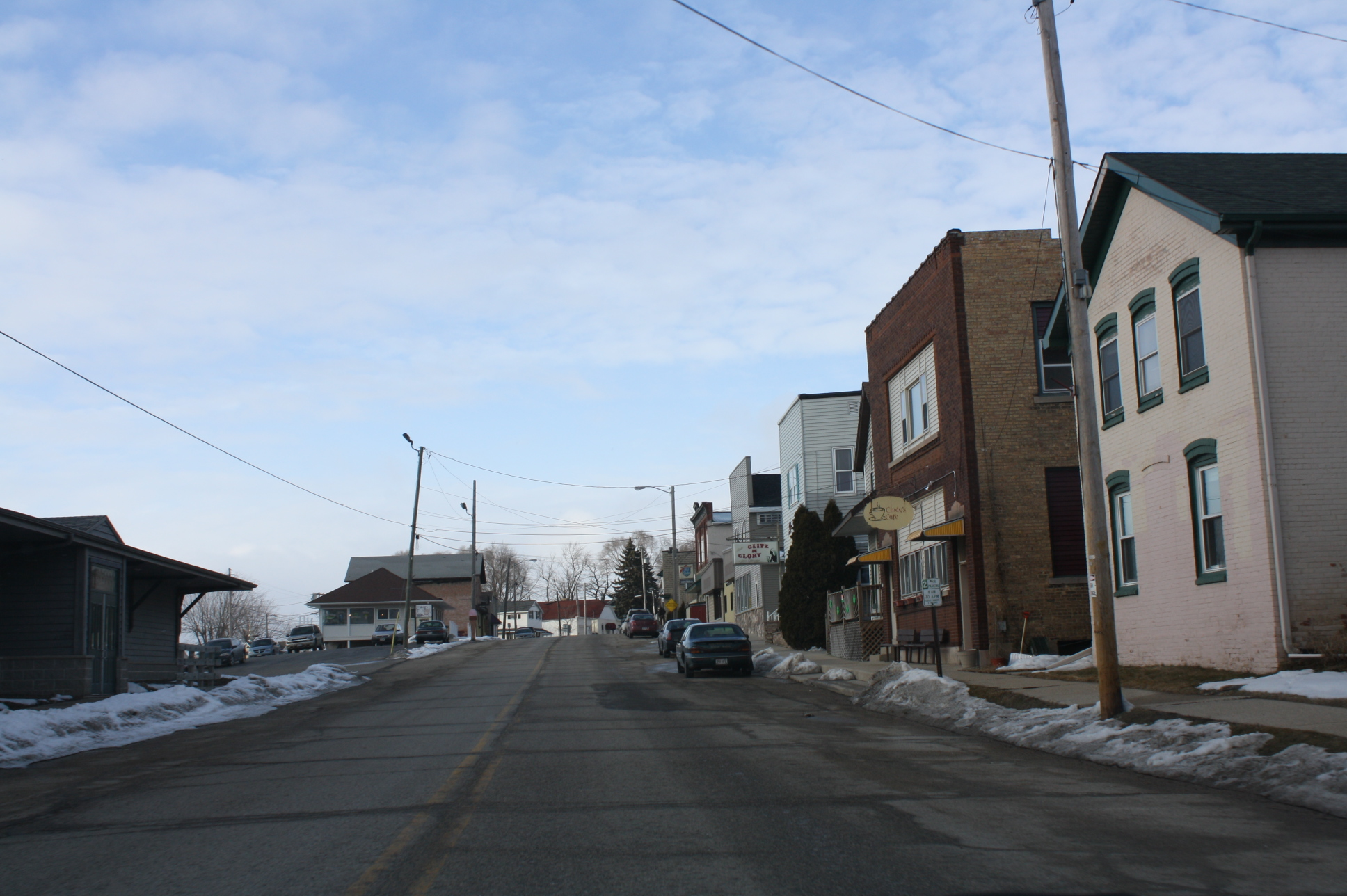
- Downtown Iron Ridge

- Location of Iron Ridge in Dodge County, Wisconsin.
- Coordinates: 43°23′57″N 88°31′52″W
- Country: United States
- State: Wisconsin
- County: Dodge

Area
  - Total: 0.68 sq mi (1.75 km^{2})
  - Land: 0.67 sq mi (1.74 km^{2})
  - Water: 0.0039 sq mi (0.01 km^{2})
- Elevation: 932 ft (284 m)

Population (2020)
  - Total: 904
  - Density: 1,350/sq mi (520/km^{2})
- Time zone: UTC-6 (Central (CST))
  - Summer (DST): UTC-5 (CDT)
- FIPS code: 55-37150
- GNIS feature ID: 1566971
- Website: https://www.ironridge-wi.net/

Iron Ridge is a village in Dodge County, Wisconsin, United States. As of the 2020 census, Iron Ridge had a population of 904. The village was founded on a railroad line, named for the iron mined in the area. Its ZIP code is 53035.

== Geography ==
Iron Ridge is located at 43°23′57″N 88°31′52″W (43.399155, -88.530996).

According to the United States Census Bureau, the village has a total area of 0.69 square miles (1.79 km^{2}), of which 0.68 square miles (1.76 km^{2}) is land and 0.01 square miles (0.03 km^{2}) is water.

== Demographics ==
Historical population
| Census | Pop. | Note | %± |
|---|---|---|---|
| 1880 | 138 | | — |
| 1920 | 287 | | — |
| 1930 | 260 | | −9.4% |
| 1940 | 273 | | 5.0% |
| 1950 | 341 | | 24.9% |
| 1960 | 419 | | 22.9% |
| 1970 | 480 | | 14.6% |
| 1980 | 766 | | 59.6% |
| 1990 | 887 | | 15.8% |
| 2000 | 998 | | 12.5% |
| 2010 | 929 | | −6.9% |
| 2020 | 904 | | −2.7% |
U.S. Decennial Census

=== 2010 census ===
As of the census of 2010, there were 929 people, 390 households, and 234 families living in the village. The population density was 1,366.2 inhabitants per square mile (527.5/km^{2}). There were 409 housing units at an average density of 601.5 per square mile (232.2/km^{2}). The racial makeup of the village was 96.9% White, 0.5% African American, 0.3% Native American, 0.1% Asian, 1.6% from other races, and 0.5% from two or more races. Hispanic or Latino of any race were 3.1% of the population.

There were 390 households, of which 30.0% had children under the age of 18 living with them, 44.1% were married couples living together, 9.2% had a female householder with no husband present, 6.7% had a male householder with no wife present, and 40.0% were non-families. 31.0% of all households were made up of individuals, and 10% had someone living alone who was 65 years of age or older. The average household size was 2.38 and the average family size was 3.00.

The median age in the village was 38.3 years. 22.9% of residents were under the age of 18; 8.4% were between the ages of 18 and 24; 28.8% were from 25 to 44; 30.6% were from 45 to 64; and 9.4% were 65 years of age or older. The gender makeup of the village was 51.8% male and 48.2% female.

=== 2000 census ===
As of the census of 2000, there were 998 people, 360 households, and 245 families living in the village. The population density was 1,402.6 people per square mile (542.7/km^{2}). There were 383 housing units at an average density of 538.3 per square mile (208.3/km^{2}). The racial makeup of the village was 99.00% White, 0.40% Native American, 0.30% from other races, and 0.30% from two or more races. Hispanic or Latino of any race were 1.00% of the population.

Just over 70% of the population report that their ancestors were from Germany.

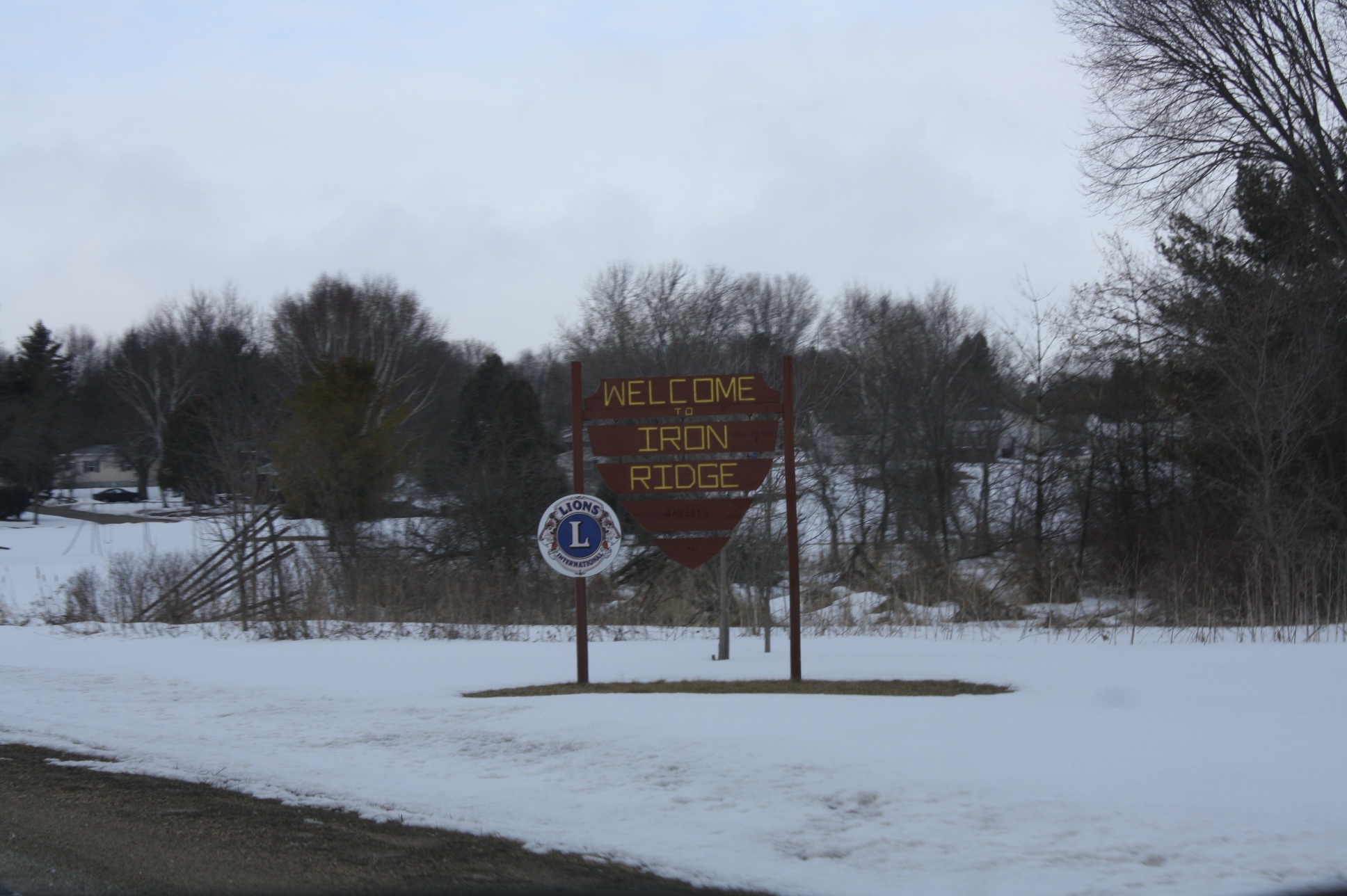
Village welcome sign

There were 360 households, out of which 42.2% had children under the age of 18 living with them, 57.8% were married couples living together, 6.9% had a female householder with no husband present, and 31.7% were non-families. 26.9% of all households were made up of individuals, and 9.4% had someone living alone who was 65 years of age or older. The average household size was 2.77 and the average family size was 3.45.

In the village, the population was spread out, with 34.0% under the age of 18, 8.5% from 18 to 24, 33.5% from 25 to 44, 15.6% from 45 to 64, and 8.4% who were 65 years of age or older. The median age was 30 years. For every 100 females, there were 100.0 males. For every 100 females age 18 and over, there were 97.3 males.

The median income for a household in the village was $42,083, and the median income for a family was $50,893. Males had a median income of $36,359 versus $23,906 for females. The per capita income for the village was $16,214. About 1.7% of families and 3.4% of the population were below the poverty line, including 3.7% of those under age 18 and 2.6% of those age 65 or over.

== Churches ==
Lutheran churches in Iron Ridge include St. Matthew Lutheran Church, founded in 1885; a member of the Wisconsin Evangelical Lutheran Synod (WELS).

== Education ==
St. Matthew Lutheran School is a Christian 4K-8 school of the WELS in Iron Ridge.

== Butler Ridge Wind Farm ==
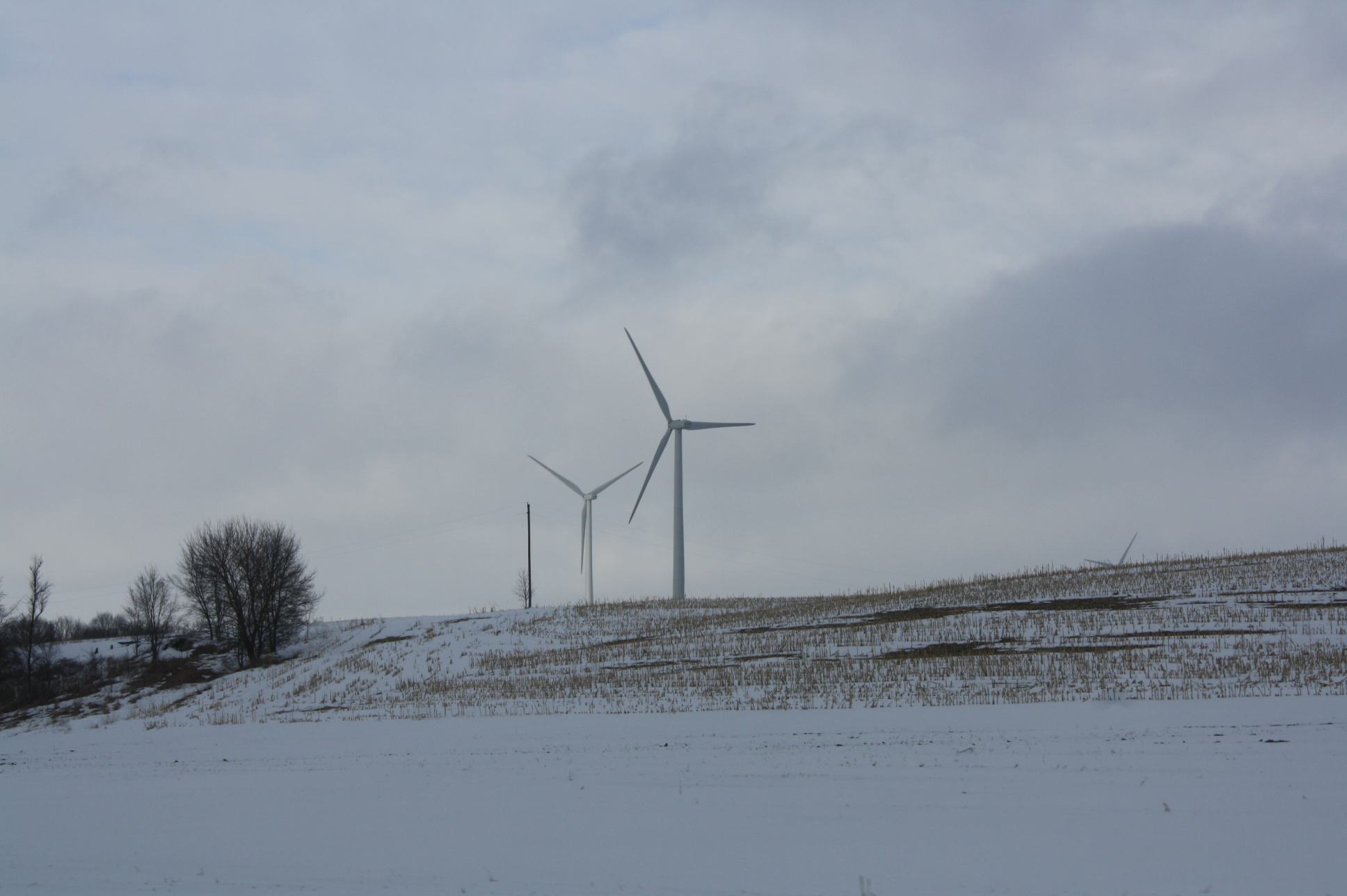
Butler Ridge Wind Farm

Iron Ridge is the community in Dodge County closest to the Butler Ridge Wind Farm, a windfarm that contains 36 turbines that are 300 feet wide and 260 feet tall. It sits along the Niagara Escarpment, a ridge that originates in Ontario, runs through Wisconsin, and ends in Illinois. It was initially developed by Midwest Wind Energy, and then acquired by Babcock & Brown, which carried it through construction. After Babcock & Brown's liquidation in 2009, the wind farm was acquired by NextEra Energy Resources. Part of the power is sold to WPPI Energy.

== Notable people ==
- Roman Bentz, American football player, was born in Iron Ridge.
- Herman J. F. Bilgrien, Wisconsin State Senator, was Chairman and Treasurer of Iron Ridge.
- Harry Doxtader, Wisconsin State Representative, lived in Iron Ridge.
- Jesse Peters, Wisconsin State Senator, was born in Iron Ridge.
- H. Albert Wrucke, Wisconsin State Representative, was born near Iron Ridge.
