= Coloma (town), Wisconsin =

Coloma, Wisconsin
- Town
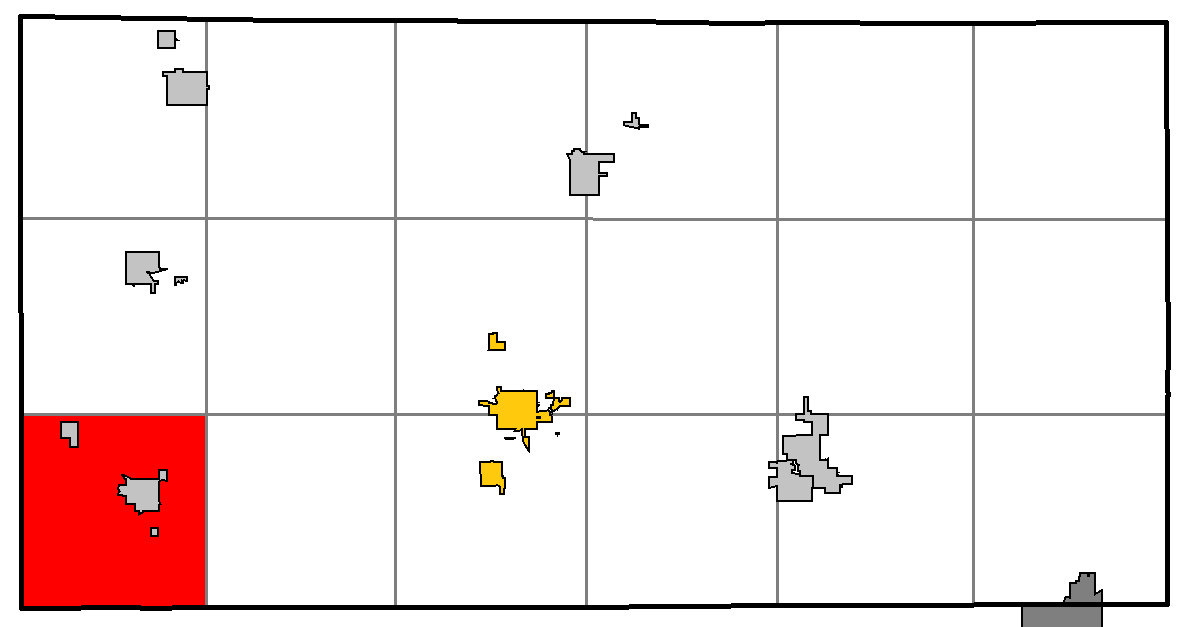
- Location of Coloma, Wisconsin

- Location of Waushara County, Wisconsin
- Country: United States
- State: Wisconsin
- County: Waushara

Area
  - Total: 32.84 sq mi (85.1 km^{2})
  - Land: 32.64 sq mi (84.5 km^{2})
  - Water: 0.20 sq mi (0.52 km^{2})
- Elevation: 850 ft (260 m)

Population (2020)
  - Total: 730
  - Density: 22/sq mi (8.6/km^{2})
- Time zone: UTC-6 (Central (CST))
  - Summer (DST): UTC-5 (CDT)
- GNIS feature ID: 1583043
- Website: https://townofcolomawi.com/

Coloma is a town in Waushara County, Wisconsin, United States. The population was 730 at the 2020 census. The coordinates shown are for the Village of Coloma, located within the town.

== Geography ==
According to the United States Census Bureau, the town has a total area of 33.3 square miles (86.2 km^{2}), of which 33.1 square miles (85.7 km^{2}) is land and 0.2 square mile (0.5 km^{2}) (0.60%) is water.

== Demographics ==
As of the census of 2000, there were 748 people, 254 households, and 195 families residing in the town. The population density was 22.6 people per square mile (8.7/km^{2}). There were 500 housing units at an average density of 15.1 per square mile (5.8/km^{2}). The racial makeup of the town was 97.59% White, 0.13% Black or African American, 1.20% from other races, and 1.07% from two or more races. 3.61% of the population were Hispanic or Latino of any race.

There were 254 households, out of which 25.6% had children under the age of 18 living with them, 66.9% were married couples living together, 5.5% had a female householder with no husband present, and 23.2% were non-families. 19.3% of all households were made up of individuals, and 7.1% had someone living alone who was 65 years of age or older. The average household size was 2.51 and the average family size was 2.88.

In the town, the population was spread out, with 19.8% under the age of 18, 4.4% from 18 to 24, 20.6% from 25 to 44, 29.8% from 45 to 64, and 25.4% who were 65 years of age or older. The median age was 48 years. For every 100 females, there were 97.4 males. For every 100 females age 18 and over, there were 92.9 males.

The median income for a household in the town was $36,406, and the median income for a family was $39,118. Males had a median income of $35,069 versus $21,786 for females. The per capita income for the town was $16,290. About 3.3% of families and 12.0% of the population were below the poverty line, including 1.9% of those under age 18 and 21.2% of those age 65 or over.
