= Clark M. Perry =

American politician

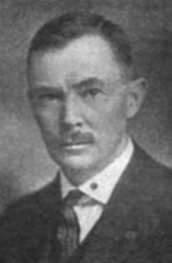

Member of the Wisconsin State Assembly
- In office 1919, 1921

Personal details
- Born: July 27, 1872 Oshkosh, Wisconsin, US
- Died: January 30, 1936 (aged 63) Milwaukee, Wisconsin, US
- Party: Republican
- Occupation: Businessman, politician

Clark M. Perry (July 27, 1872 – January 30, 1936) was an American businessman and politician.

== Biography ==
Born in Oshkosh, Wisconsin, Perry went to Oshkosh High School. He then worked as a decorating contractor. In 1919 and 1921, Perry served in the Wisconsin State Assembly and was a Republican. From 1924 t0 1926, Perry served as Wisconsin Prohibition Chief.

In 1926, Perry pleaded guilty to a charge of liquor conspiracy while serving as Prohibition Chief. He was sentenced to 3 years in prison but was released after serving one year. Perry died at his home in Milwaukee, Wisconsin after a long illness.
