= Herman J. F. Bilgrien =

American politician

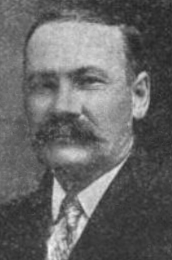

Member of the Wisconsin Senate
- In office 1919–1926

Personal details
- Born: March 19, 1864 Dodge County, Wisconsin, US
- Died: February 1, 1946 (aged 81) Iron Ridge, Wisconsin, US
- Party: Republican

Herman J. F. Bilgrien (March 19, 1864 - February 1, 1946) was a member of the Wisconsin State Senate.

== Biography ==
Bilgrien was born on March 19, 1864, in Dodge County, Wisconsin. He would become involved in agriculture. He died at his home in Iron Ridge, Wisconsin on February 1, 1946.

== Political career ==
Bilgrien was a member of the Senate from 1919 to 1926. Additionally, he was Chairman and Treasurer of Iron Ridge. He was a Republican.
