= Orrin Fletcher =

American politician

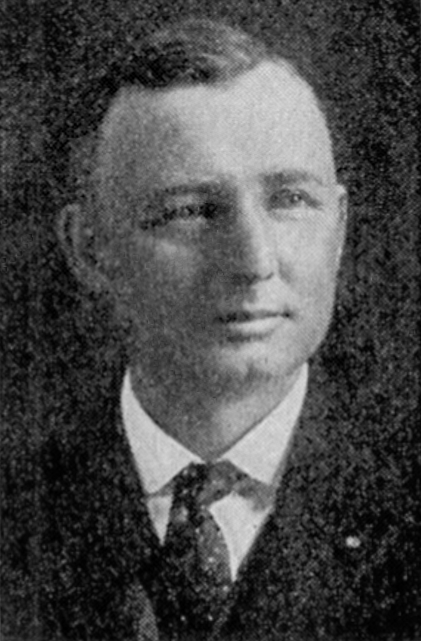

Member of the Wisconsin State Assembly
- In office 1919

Personal details
- Born: April 15, 1877 Burns, Wisconsin, US
- Died: January 8, 1939 (aged 61) Sparta, Wisconsin, US
- Party: Republican
- Occupation: Farmer, politician

Orrin Fletcher (1877–1939) was a member of the Wisconsin State Assembly.

== Biography ==
Fletcher was born on April 15, 1877, in Burns, Wisconsin. He would become a farmer and president of a cooperative creamery and a cooperative telephone company.

He died at his home in Sparta, Wisconsin on January 8, 1939.

== Political career ==
Fletcher was elected to the Assembly in 1918. Additionally, he was chairman (similar to Mayor) of Burns and a member of the County Board of La Crosse County, Wisconsin. He was a Republican.
