= Isaac P. Witter =

American politician (1873–1942)

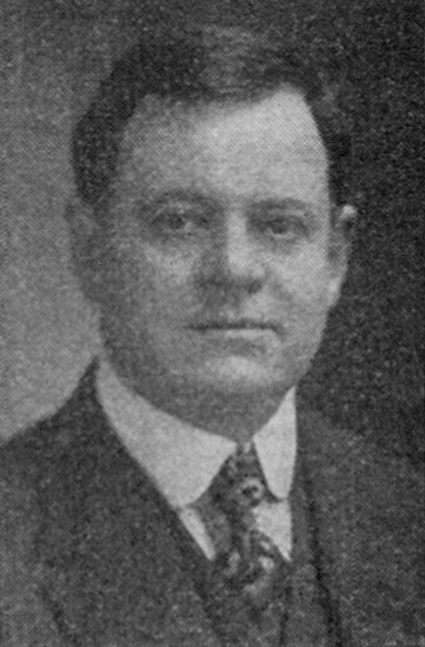

Member of the Wisconsin State Senate
- In office 1916–1920

Personal details
- Born: May 11, 1873 Wisconsin Rapids, Wisconsin, US
- Died: September 26, 1942 (aged 69) Wisconsin Rapids, Wisconsin, US
- Party: Republican
- Spouse: Charlotte L. Gibson (m. 1900)
- Children: 1
- Education: University of Wisconsin–Madison
- Occupation: Banker

Isaac P. Witter (May 11, 1873 – September 26, 1942) was a member of the Wisconsin State Senate.

== Biography ==
Witter was born on May 11, 1873, in Wisconsin Rapids, Wisconsin. He attended the University of Wisconsin–Madison and married Charlotte L. Gibson, the daughter of an Episcopal clergyman, in 1900. They had one son. Witter was a member of the Benevolent and Protective Order of Elks. Witter worked at the Bank of Grand Rapids, which he became president of. Witter was also involved with the Consolidated Water & Power Company.

Witter died in Wisconsin Rapids, Wisconsin, on September 26, 1942.

== Political career ==
Witter was a member of the Senate during the 1917 and 1919 sessions. Additionally, he was a school board member. He was a Republican.
