= John F. Buckley =

American lawyer and politician

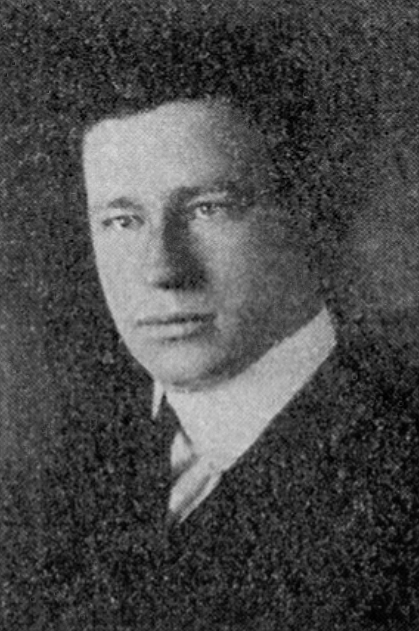

Member of the Wisconsin State Assembly
- In office 1917, 1919

Personal details
- Born: February 10, 1892 Waukesha, Wisconsin, US
- Died: November 17, 1965 (aged 73) Pewaukee, Wisconsin, US
- Political party: Republican
- Education: Carroll University; University of Wisconsin Law School
- Occupation: Businessman, politician

John F. Buckley (February 10, 1892 – November 17, 1965) was an American lawyer and politician.

== Biography ==
Born in Waukesha, Wisconsin, Buckley went to Carroll University and then received his law degree from University of Wisconsin Law School. Buckley then practiced law in Waukesha, Wisconsin. In 1917 and 1919, Buckley served in the Wisconsin State Assembly and was a Republican.

He died in Pewaukee, Wisconsin on November 17, 1965.
