= Cassian, Wisconsin =

- Town
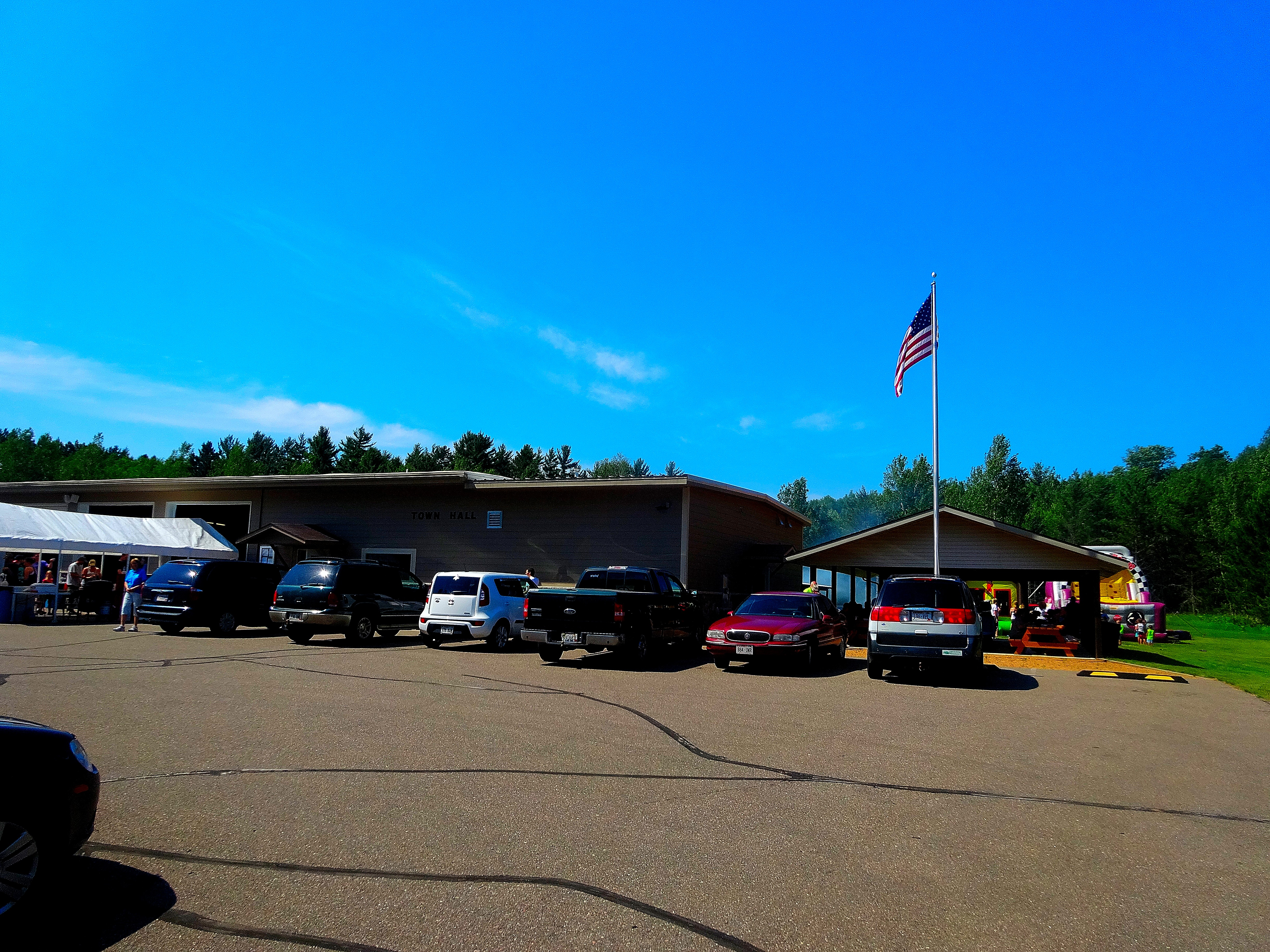
- Town hall

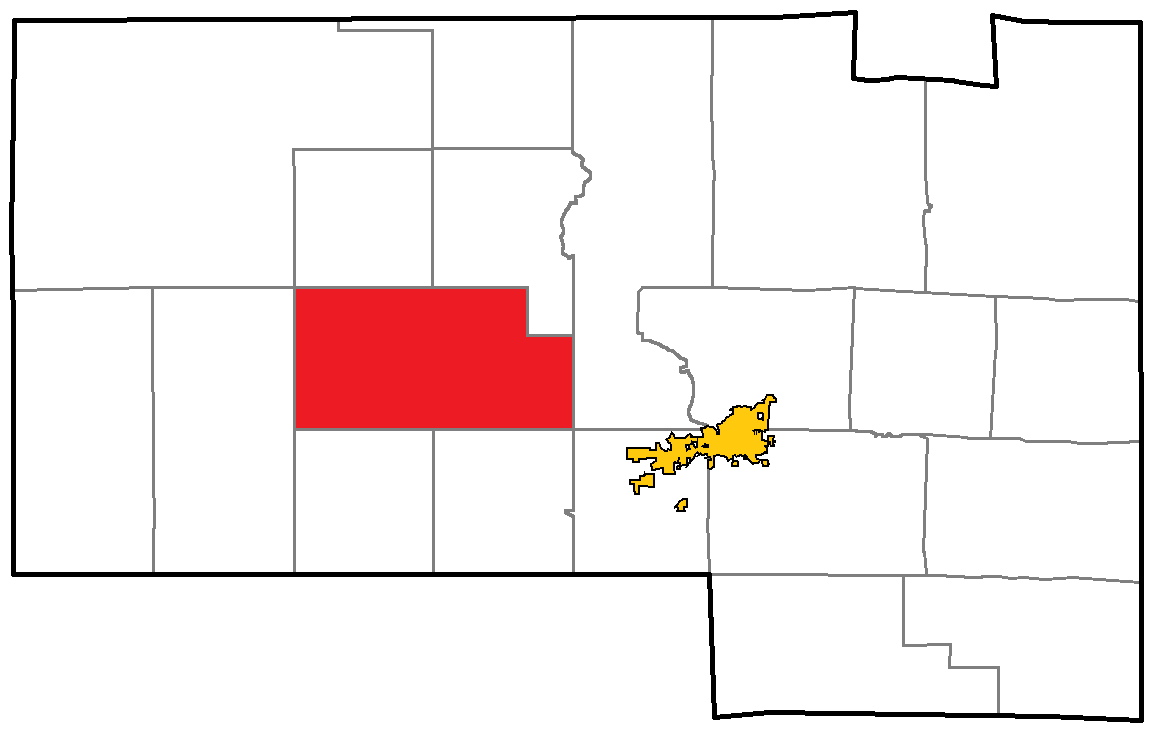
- Location of Cassian, within Oneida County
- Coordinates: 45°41′12″N 89°41′56″W
- Country: United States
- State: Wisconsin
- County: Oneida

Area
  - Total: 68.3 sq mi (177.0 km^{2})
  - Land: 65.0 sq mi (168.3 km^{2})
  - Water: 3.4 sq mi (8.7 km^{2})
- Elevation: 1,558 ft (475 m)

Population (2020)
  - Total: 1,069
  - Density: 16.45/sq mi (6.352/km^{2})
- Time zone: UTC-6 (Central (CST))
  - Summer (DST): UTC-5 (CDT)
- Area codes: 715 & 534
- FIPS code: 55-13025
- GNIS feature ID: 1582926
- Website: https://townofcassianwi.gov/

Cassian is a town in Oneida County, Wisconsin, United States. The population was 1,069 at the 2020 census. The unincorporated communities of Goodnow and Harshaw are located in the town.

== Geography ==
According to the United States Census Bureau, the town has a total area of 68.3 square miles (177.0 km^{2}), of which 65.0 square miles (168.3 km^{2}) is land and 3.4 square miles (8.7 km^{2}) (4.92%) is water.

== Demographics ==
As of the census of 2000, there were 962 people, 402 households, and 322 families residing in the town. The population density was 14.8 people per square mile (5.7/km^{2}). There were 1,011 housing units at an average density of 15.6 per square mile (6.0/km^{2}). The racial makeup of the town was 99.27% White, 0.10% Native American, 0.31% from other races, and 0.31% from two or more races. Hispanic or Latino of any race were 0.21% of the population.

There were 402 households, out of which 25.9% had children under the age of 18 living with them, 70.4% were married couples living together, 4.2% had a female householder with no husband present, and 19.7% were non-families. 15.2% of all households were made up of individuals, and 6.2% had someone living alone who was 65 years of age or older. The average household size was 2.39 and the average family size was 2.65.

In the town, the population was spread out, with 19.4% under the age of 18, 4.5% from 18 to 24, 25.9% from 25 to 44, 32.0% from 45 to 64, and 18.2% who were 65 years of age or older. The median age was 45 years. For every 100 females, there were 108.7 males. For every 100 females age 18 and over, there were 107.2 males.

The median income for a household in the town was $39,844, and the median income for a family was $47,000. Males had a median income of $35,208 versus $23,906 for females. The per capita income for the town was $22,794. About 4.1% of families and 5.7% of the population were below the poverty line, including 7.7% of those under age 18 and 10.3% of those age 65 or over.

== Transportation ==
The Rhinelander-Oneida County Airport (KRHI) serves Cassian, the county and surrounding communities with both scheduled commercial jet service and general aviation services.
