= Harry Hewett =

American politician

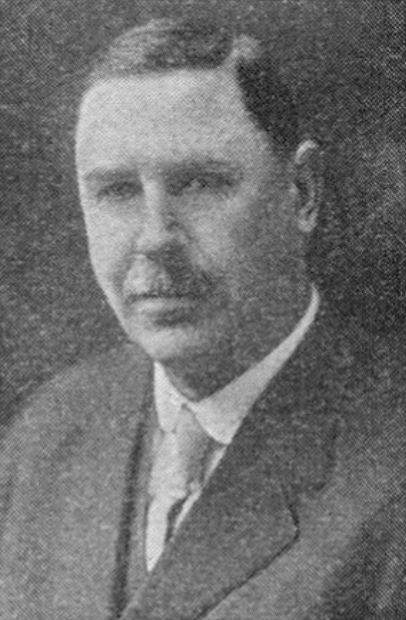

Member of the Wisconsin State Assembly
- In office 1919

Personal details
- Born: March 4, 1867 Essex County, New York, US
- Died: May 10, 1931 (aged 64) Stevens Point, Wisconsin, US
- Party: Republican
- Occupation: Farmer

Harry Hewett (March 4, 1867 – May 10, 1931) was a member of the Wisconsin State Assembly.

== Biography ==
Hewett was born on March 4, 1867, in Essex County, New York. Later, he moved to Clark County, Wisconsin.

He died at his home in Stevens Point, Wisconsin on May 10, 1931.

== Career ==
Hewett was elected to the Assembly in 1918. Additionally, he was Sheriff of Clark County and a member of the Clark County Board of Supervisors. He was a Republican.
