= Frank Ploetz =

American politician

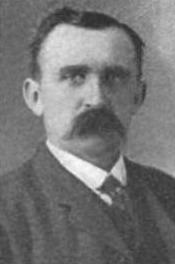

Member of the Wisconsin State Assembly
- In office 1919–1923

Personal details
- Born: Frank William Ploetz; April 27, 1870 Germany
- Died: May 18, 1944 (aged 74) Coloma, Wisconsin, US
- Party: Republican
- Occupation: Farmer, politician

Frank William Ploetz (April 27, 1870 – May 18, 1944) was an American farmer and politician.

== Biography ==
Ploetz was born in Germany and emigrated with his parents to the United States in 1875. Ploetz eventually settled in Coloma, Wisconsin. Ploetz was a farmer. He was involved with the Coloma Creamery Company, the Coloma Telephone Company, the Coloma Produce Company, and the Pleasant Lake Summer Resort. Ploetz served in the Wisconsin Assembly from 1919 to 1923 and was a Republican. He also served on the Wisconsin Board of Vocational Education. Ploetz also served as the United States Prohibition agent and the United States Internal Revenue Collector.

He died at his home in Coloma on May 18, 1944.
