= James Pedersen =

American politician

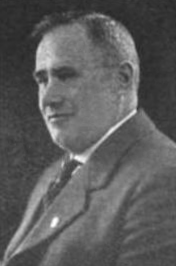

Member of the Wisconsin State Assembly
- In office 1919, 1923

Personal details
- Born: November 5, 1868 Denmark
- Died: January 16, 1944 (aged 75) Marinette, Wisconsin, US
- Party: Republican
- Occupation: Businessman, politician

James Pedersen (November 5, 1868 – January 16, 1944) was an American businessman and politician.

== Biography ==
Born in Denmark, Pedersen emigrated to the United States and settled in Marinette, Wisconsin in 1887. He was in the wholesale fish business. Pedersen served on the Marinette Common Council. He also served on the Marinette Harbor Commission and the Marinette Fire and Police Commission. During World War I, Pedersen was an agent for the Public Service Reserve for Marinette County. Pedersen served in the Wisconsin State Assembly in 1919 and 1923 and was a Republican. Pedersen died in a hospital in Marinette after being in ill health.
