= Greenfield, La Crosse County, Wisconsin =

Greenfield, Wisconsin
- Town
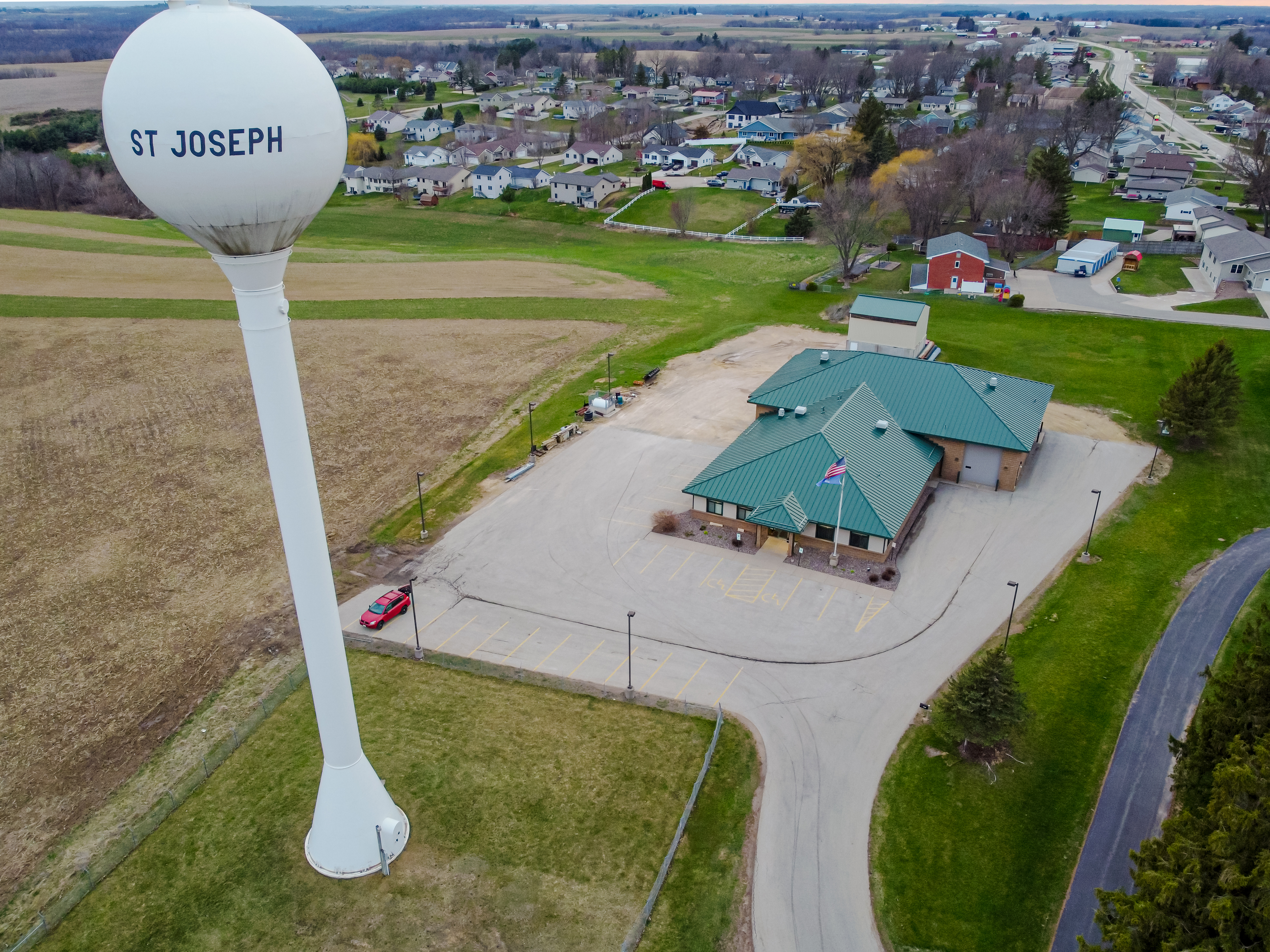
- Town hall and water tower in foreground

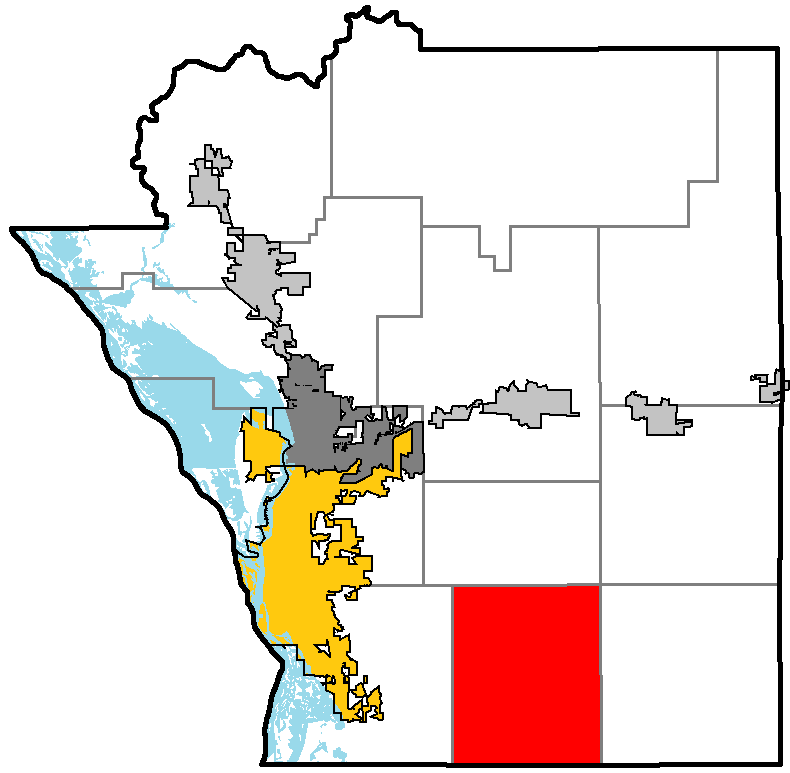
- Location of Greenfield, La Crosse County

- Location of La Crosse County, Wisconsin
- Coordinates: 43°46′15″N 91°4′0″W
- Country: United States
- State: Wisconsin
- County: La Crosse

Area
  - Total: 30.1 sq mi (77.9 km^{2})
  - Land: 30.1 sq mi (77.9 km^{2})
  - Water: 0 sq mi (0.0 km^{2})
- Elevation: 1,263 ft (385 m)

Population (2020)
  - Total: 2,187
  - Density: 72.7/sq mi (28.1/km^{2})
- Time zone: UTC-6 (Central (CST))
  - Summer (DST): UTC-5 (CDT)
- ZIP Codes: 54601 (La Crosse); 54623 (Coon Valley)
- Area code: 608
- FIPS code: 55-31150
- GNIS feature ID: 1583313
- Website: www.greenfieldlaxwi.gov

Greenfield is a town in La Crosse County, Wisconsin, United States. It is part of the La Crosse Metropolitan Statistical Area. The population was 2,187 as of the 2020 census, up from 2,060 at the 2010 census. The census-designated place of St. Joseph is located in the town.

== Geography ==
According to the United States Census Bureau, the town has a total area of 30.1 square miles (77.9 km^{2}), all land.

== Demographics ==
Historical population
Year	Pop.	±%
1980	1,512	—
1990	1,550	+2.5%
2000	1,538	−0.8%
2010	2,060	+33.9%

As of the census of 2000, there were 1,538 people, 549 households, and 434 families residing in the town. The population density was 51.1 people per square mile (19.7/km^{2}). There were 570 housing units at an average density of 18.9 per square mile (7.3/km^{2}). The racial makeup of the town was 98.50% White, 0.07% African American, 0.59% Asian, 0.39% from other races, and 0.46% from two or more races. Hispanic or Latino of any race were 0.85% of the population.

There were 549 households, out of which 39.5% had children under the age of 18 living with them, 70.1% were married couples living together, 4.7% had a female householder with no husband present, and 20.9% were non-families. 15.3% of all households were made up of individuals, and 4.2% had someone living alone who was 65 years of age or older. The average household size was 2.80 and the average family size was 3.16.

In the town, the population was spread out, with 29.8% under the age of 18, 5.9% from 18 to 24, 31.3% from 25 to 44, 23.2% from 45 to 64, and 9.7% who were 65 years of age or older. The median age was 35 years. For every 100 females, there were 106.4 males. For every 100 females age 18 and over, there were 105.9 males.

The median income for a household in the town was $49,653, and the median income for a family was $52,625. Males had a median income of $35,833 versus $25,673 for females. The per capita income for the town was $20,501. About 4.1% of families and 4.6% of the population were below the poverty line, including 7.3% of those under age 18 and none of those age 65 or over.

== Notable people ==
- Henry Freehoff, Wisconsin state representative; born in the town
- George Albert Hammes, Roman Catholic bishop; born in St. Joseph

== Economy ==
The Franciscan Sisters of Perpetual Adoration have their retirement home in St. Joseph.
