= 57th Wisconsin Legislature =

Wisconsin legislative term for 1925–1926

←	56th	58th	→
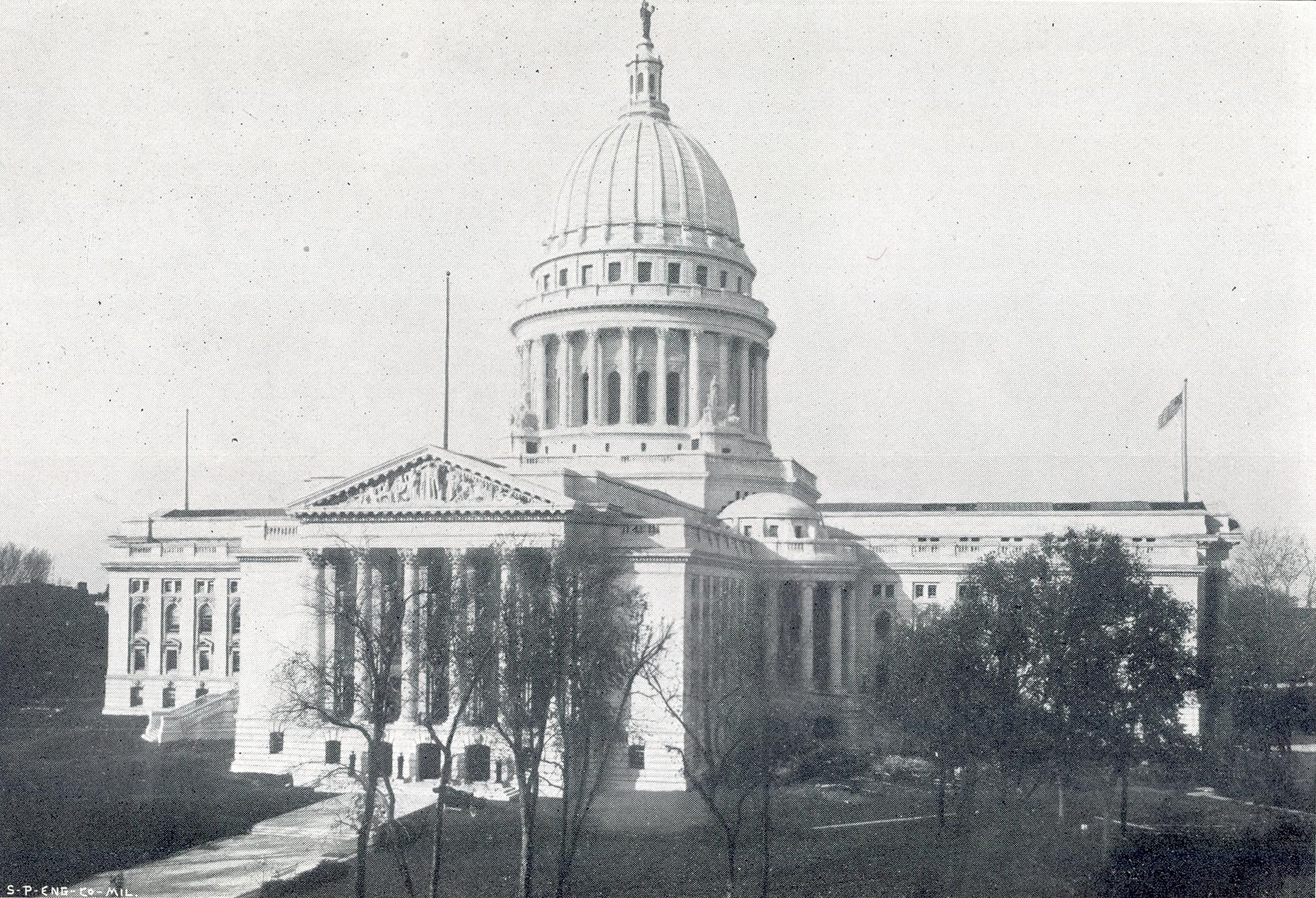
- Wisconsin State Capitol ca.1915

Overview
- Legislative body: Wisconsin Legislature
- Meeting place: Wisconsin State Capitol
- Term: January 5, 1925 – January 3, 1927
- Election: November 4, 1924

Senate
- Members: 33
- Senate President: Henry Huber (R)
- President pro tempore: Howard Teasdale (R)
- Party control: Republican

Assembly
- Members: 100
- Assembly Speaker: Herman W. Sachtjen (R) ^{(until Dec. 31, 1925)}; George A. Nelson (R) ^{(from Apr. 15, 1926)}
- Party control: Republican

Sessions
- Regular: January 14, 1925 – June 29, 1925

Special sessions
- Apr. 1926 Spec.: April 15, 1926 – April 16, 1926

The Fifty-Seventh Wisconsin Legislature convened from January 14, 1925, to June 29, 1925, in regular session, and reconvened in a special session in April 1926.

This was the first session in the history of the Wisconsin Legislature with female legislators. There were three in this session: Mildred Barber, Hellen M. Brooks, and Helen F. Thompson.

Senators representing even-numbered districts were newly elected for this session and were serving the first two years of a four-year term. Assembly members were elected to a two-year term. Assembly members and even-numbered senators were elected in the general election of November 4, 1924. Senators representing odd-numbered districts were serving the third and fourth year of a four-year term, having been elected in the general election of November 7, 1922.

The governor of Wisconsin during this entire term was Republican John J. Blaine, of Grant County, serving his third two-year term, having won re-election in the 1924 Wisconsin gubernatorial election.

== Major events ==
- January 5, 1925: Third inauguration of John J. Blaine as Governor of Wisconsin.
- March 4, 1925: Second inauguration of President Calvin Coolidge.
- April 7, 1925: E. Ray Stevens was elected to the Wisconsin Supreme Court.
- June 18, 1925: Wisconsin's senior United States senator, Robert M. La Follette, died in Washington, D.C.
- June 24, 1925: A statue of Hans Christian Heg was unveiled on the grounds of the Wisconsin State Capitol.
- August 8, 1925: Roughly 30,000 members of the Ku Klux Klan paraded through Washington, D.C.
- September 18, 1925: The Green Bay Packers played their first game at City Stadium.
- September 29, 1925: Robert M. La Follette Jr. won a special election to succeed his father as United States senator from Wisconsin.
- December 31, 1925: Wisconsin Assembly speaker Herman W. Sachtjen resigned from the Assembly after being appointed a Wisconsin circuit court judge.
- March 16, 1926: Robert H. Goddard launched the first liquid-fuel rocket in Auburn, Massachusetts.
- May 20, 1926: The Air Commerce Act was signed into law by U.S. President Calvin Coolidge, establishing the first flight safety regulations in the United States.
- November 2, 1926: 1926 United States general election:
  - Fred R. Zimmerman elected Governor of Wisconsin.
  - Incumbent Wisconsin governor John J. Blaine elected United States senator from Wisconsin.
  - Wisconsin voters ratified two amendments to the state constitution:
    - Allowing the Governor's salary to be set by legislation rather than fixed in the constitution.
    - Allowing the recall of elected officials to be initiated by public petition.
- November 11, 1926: The United States Numbered Highway System was established by the American Association of State Highway and Transportation Officials.

== Major legislation ==
- May 21, 1925: An Act ... relating to the minimum wage for women and minor employes, 1925 Act 176. Created new regulatory and permitting powers for the Wisconsin Industrial Commission to ensure adequate compensation for women and children in the workplace.
- 1925 Joint Resolution 7: Joint Resolution ratifying an amendment to the constitution of the United States relating to child labor. Wisconsin's ratification of the Child Labor Amendment.
- 1925 Joint Resolution 16: Joint Resolution to create section 12 of article XIII of the constitution, relating to the recall of elective public officers. Second legislative passage of a proposed amendment to the state constitution to enable the recall of public officials, initiated by public petition. This amendment was ratified at the November 1926 election.
- 1925 Joint Resolution 24: Joint Resolution memorializing congress to provide for earlier seating of senators and representatives elect. Endorsed moving the start of congressional sessions from March to January.
- 1925 Joint Resolution 26: Joint Resolution to amend sections 2 and 3 of article VII of the constitution, relating to the jurisdiction of the judiciary over acts of the legislature. In an attempted power grab by the Legislature, this amendment to the state constitution was proposed to require a two-thirds majority of the state supreme court to find an act of the legislature unconstitutional. This amendment was never ratified.
- 1925 Joint Resolution 29: Joint Resolution memorializing Congress to propose an amendment to the constitution of the United States providing for the election of president and vice-president by popular vote.
- 1925 Joint Resolution 33: Joint Resolution to amend section 21 of article IV of the constitution, relating to compensation of members of the legislature. First legislative passage of a proposed amendment to the state constitution to update the legislator salary to $1,000 per term. This amendment was rejected by voters in 1927.
- 1925 Joint Resolution 52: Joint Resolution to amend section 5 of article V of the constitution, relating to the compensation of the governor. Second legislative passage of a proposed amendment to the state constitution to allow the governor's pay to be set by legislation rather than fixed in the constitution. This amendment was ratified at the November 1926 election.
- 1925 Joint Resolution 61: Joint Resolution to amend section 1 of article VIII of the constitution, relating to taxation of forests and minerals and of forest and mineral lands. First legislative passage of a proposed amendment to the state constitution to adjust taxation of forest land. This amendment was ratified by voters in 1927.

== Party summary ==
=== Senate summary ===
Senate partisan composition Socialist: 3 seats Republican: 30 seats

	Party (Shading indicates majority caucus)			Total	
	Dem.	Soc.	Rep.	Total	Vacant
End of previous Legislature	0	3	29	32	1
Start of Reg. Session	0	3	30	33	0
Final voting share	9.09%		90.91%		
Beginning of the next Legislature	0	2	31	33	0

=== Assembly summary ===
Assembly partisan composition Democratic: 1 seat Socialist: 7 seats Republican: 92 seats

	Party (Shading indicates majority caucus)				Total	
	Dem.	Soc.	Ind.	Rep.	Total	Vacant
End of previous Legislature	1	10	0	88	99	1
Start of Reg. Session	1	7	0	92	100	0
From Apr. 15, 1925 (Note: Republican Frank Roemhild (Barron County) died.)	1	7	0	91	99	1
From Dec. 31, 1925 (Note: Republican Herman W. Sachtjen (Dane County) resigned.)	1	7	0	90	98	2
From Jan. 3, 1926 (Note: Republican Erick H. Johnson (Burnett & Washburn counties) died.)	1	7	0	89	97	3
From Aug. 20, 1926 (Note: Republican Robert Naumann (Manitowoc County) died.)	1	7	0	88	96	4
Final voting share	8.33%			91.67%		
Beginning of the next Legislature	2	8	1	89	100	0

== Sessions ==
- Regular session: January 14, 1925 – June 29, 1925
- April 1926 special session: April 15, 1926 – April 16, 1926

== Leaders ==
=== Senate leadership ===
- President of the Senate: Henry Huber (R)
- President pro tempore: Howard Teasdale (R–Sparta)

=== Assembly leadership ===
- Speaker of the Assembly: Herman W. Sachtjen (R–Madison) (until Dec. 31, 1925)
  - George A. Nelson (R–Milltown) (from April 15, 1926)

== Members ==
=== Members of the Senate ===
Members of the Senate for the Fifty-Seventh Wisconsin Legislature:

Senate partisan representation Socialist: 3 seats Republican: 30 seats

Dist.	Counties	Senator	Residence	Party
01	Door, Kewaunee, & Manitowoc	John E. Cashman	Denmark	Rep.
02	Brown & Oconto	John B. Chase	Oconto	Rep.
03	Milwaukee (South City)	Walter Polakowski	Milwaukee	Soc.
04	Milwaukee (Northeast County & Northeast City)	Oscar Morris	Milwaukee	Rep.
05	Milwaukee (Northwest City)	Bernhard Gettelman	Milwaukee	Rep.
06	Milwaukee (North-Central City)	Joseph A. Padway	Milwaukee	Soc.
07	Milwaukee (Southeast County & Southeast City)	William F. Quick	Milwaukee	Soc.
08	Milwaukee (Western County)	Harry Daggett	West Milwaukee	Rep.
09	Milwaukee (City Downtown)	Irving P. Mehigan	Milwaukee	Rep.
10	Buffalo, Pepin, Pierce, & St. Croix	Walter H. Hunt	River Falls	Rep.
11	Bayfield, Burnett, Douglas, & Washburn	Marcus A. Kemp	Superior	Rep.
12	Ashland, Iron, Price, Rusk, Sawyer, & Vilas	James H. Carroll	Glidden	Rep.
13	Dodge & Washington	Herman J. F. Bilgrien	Iron Ridge	Rep.
14	Outagamie & Shawano	John Englund	Wittenberg	Rep.
15	Rock	Alva Garey	Edgerton	Rep.
16	Crawford, Grant, & Vernon	Edward J. Roethe	Fennimore	Rep.
17	Green, Iowa, & Lafayette	Olaf H. Johnson	Gratiot	Rep.
18	Fond du Lac, Green Lake & Waushara	William A. Titus	Fond du Lac	Rep.
19	Calumet & Winnebago	Merritt F. White	Winneconne	Rep.
20	Ozaukee & Sheboygan	Herman E. Boldt	Sheboygan Falls	Rep.
21	Racine	Max W. Heck	Racine	Rep.
22	Kenosha & Walworth	George W. Hull	Whitewater	Rep.
23	Portage & Waupaca	Herman J. Severson	Iola	Rep.
24	Clark, Taylor, & Wood	William L. Smith	Neillsville	Rep.
25	Lincoln & Marathon	Joseph L. Barber	Marathon City	Rep.
26	Dane	Harry Sauthoff	Madison	Rep.
27	Columbia, Richland, & Sauk	George Staudenmayer	Portage	Rep.
28	Chippewa & Eau Claire	Herman Lange	Eau Claire	Rep.
29	Barron, Dunn, & Polk	Carl B. Casperson	Frederic	Rep.
30	Florence, Forest, Langlade, Marinette, & Oneida	James A. Barker	Antigo	Rep.
31	Adams, Juneau, Monroe, & Marquette	Howard Teasdale	Sparta	Rep.
32	Jackson, La Crosse, & Trempealeau	V. S. Keppel	Holmen	Rep.
33	Jefferson & Waukesha	John C. Schumann	Watertown	Rep.

=== Members of the Assembly ===
Members of the Assembly for the Fifty-Seventh Wisconsin Legislature:

Assembly partisan composition Democratic: 1 seat Socialist: 7 seats Republican: 92 seats

Milwaukee County districts

Senate Dist.	County	Dist.	Representative	Party	Residence
31	Adams & Marquette		Robert B. Wood	Rep.	Adams
12	Ashland		Bernard F. Mathiowetz	Rep.	Ashland
29	Barron		Frank Roemhild (died Apr. 15, 1925)	Rep.	Prairie Farm
29	Barron		--Vacant from Apr. 15, 1925--		
11	Bayfield		Alfred M. Warden	Rep.	Washburn
02	Brown	1	Malcolm A. Sellers	Rep.	Green Bay
02	Brown	2	Gustav J. Zittlow	Rep.	Lawrence
10	Buffalo & Pepin		Marcellus Dorwin	Rep.	Durand
11	Burnett & Washburn		Erick H. Johnson (died Jan. 3, 1926)	Rep.	
11	Burnett & Washburn		--Vacant from Jan. 3, 1926--		
19	Calumet		Carl Hillmann	Rep.	Brillion
28	Chippewa		Paul H. Raihle	Rep.	Cadott
24	Clark		Arlo Huckstead	Rep.	Neillsville
27	Columbia		Robert Caldwell	Rep.	Lodi
16	Crawford		Archie J. McDowell	Rep.	Soldiers Grove
26	Dane	1	Herman W. Sachtjen (until Dec. 31, 1925)	Rep.	Madison
26	Dane	1	--Vacant from Jan. 1, 1926--		
26	Dane	2	James C. Hanson	Rep.	Deerfield
26	Dane	3	Carl M. Grimstad	Rep.	Mount Horeb
13	Dodge	1	John M. Dihring	Rep.	Brownsville
13	Dodge	2	Fred E. Moul	Rep.	Burnett
01	Door		Bert D. Thorp	Rep.	Ephraim
11	Douglas	1	C. S. Geraldson	Rep.	Superior
11	Douglas	2	R. Bruce Johnson	Rep.	Superior
29	Dunn		James D. Millar	Rep.	Menomonie
28	Eau Claire		C. N. Saugen	Rep.	Pleasant Valley
30	Florence, Forest, & Oneida		S. J. Gwidt	Rep.	Rhinelander
18	Fond du Lac	1	Math Koenigs	Rep.	Fond du Lac
18	Fond du Lac	2	Thomas Dieringer	Rep.	Campbellsport
16	Grant	1	George Slack	Rep.	Platteville
16	Grant	2	Charles E. Tuffley	Rep.	Boscobel
17	Green		William Olson	Rep.	Monroe
18	Green Lake & Waushara		Hellen M. Brooks	Rep.	Coloma
17	Iowa		Charles W. Hutchison	Rep.	Mineral Point
12	Iron & Vilas		Richard C. Trembath	Rep.	Hurley
32	Jackson		William F. Dettinger	Rep.	Hixton
33	Jefferson		Henry W. Stokes	Rep.	Waterloo
31	Juneau		Clinton G. Price	Rep.	Mauston
22	Kenosha	1	Conrad Shearer	Rep.	Kenosha
22	Kenosha	2	Don J. Vincent	Rep.	Genoa City
01	Kewaunee		Anton Holly	Rep.	Carlton
32	La Crosse	1	James D. H. Peterson	Rep.	La Crosse
32	La Crosse	2	John Larson	Rep.	West Salem
17	Lafayette		James U. Goodman	Rep.	Lamont
30	Langlade		James A. Cody	Dem.	Antigo
25	Lincoln		George Frederick	Rep.	Merrill
01	Manitowoc	1	Robert Naumann died Aug. 20, 1926)	Rep.	Manitowoc
01	Manitowoc	1	--Vacant from Aug. 20, 1926--		
01	Manitowoc	2	Fred A. Fredrich	Rep.	Maple Grove
25	Marathon	1	Mildred Barber	Rep.	Marathon
25	Marathon	2	Henry Ellenbecker	Rep.	Wausau
30	Marinette		Frank L. Kersten	Rep.	Crivitz
09	Milwaukee	1	Thomas H. Conway	Rep.	Milwaukee
09	Milwaukee	2	Michael Laffey	Rep.	Milwaukee
04	Milwaukee	3	Frank J. Weber	Soc.	Milwaukee
04	Milwaukee	4	Thomas Duncan	Soc.	Milwaukee
07	Milwaukee	5	Julius Jensen	Rep.	Milwaukee
06	Milwaukee	6	B. Z. Glass	Rep.	Milwaukee
06	Milwaukee	7	Alex C. Ruffing	Soc.	Milwaukee
03	Milwaukee	8	Frank Cieszynski	Soc.	Milwaukee
06	Milwaukee	9	Julius Kiesner	Soc.	Milwaukee
08	Milwaukee	10	John W. Eber	Rep.	Milwaukee
03	Milwaukee	11	Olaf C. Olsen	Soc.	Milwaukee
05	Milwaukee	12	Henry A. Staab	Rep.	Milwaukee
04	Milwaukee	13	Ernst Pahl	Rep.	Milwaukee
07	Milwaukee	14	Herbert H. Smith	Rep.	Milwaukee
05	Milwaukee	15	Theodore Engel	Rep.	Milwaukee
08	Milwaukee	16	Charles B. Perry	Rep.	Wauwatosa
07	Milwaukee	17	Clarence C. Krause	Rep.	Lake
04	Milwaukee	18	Frank L. Prescott	Rep.	Whitefish Bay
08	Milwaukee	19	George C. Hinkley	Rep.	West Allis
05	Milwaukee	20	William Coleman	Soc.	Milwaukee
31	Monroe		Earl D. Hall	Rep.	Greenfield
02	Oconto		Samuel P. Walsh	Rep.	Oconto
14	Outagamie	1	Fred A. Mueller	Rep.	Black Creek
14	Outagamie	2	Anton M. Miller	Rep.	Kaukauna
20	Ozaukee		Fred J. Busse	Rep.	Theinsville
10	Pierce		Theodore Swanson	Rep.	Ellsworth
29	Polk		George A. Nelson	Rep.	Milltown
23	Portage		Ben Halverson	Rep.	New Hope
12	Price		Helen F. Thompson	Rep.	Park Falls
21	Racine	1	Wallace Ingalls	Rep.	Racine
21	Racine	2	Edward F. Hilker	Rep.	Racine
21	Racine	3	John H. Kamper	Rep.	Raymond
27	Richland		Elias R. Cushman	Rep.	Viola
15	Rock	1	George W. Blanchard	Rep.	Edgerton
15	Rock	2	Herbert Moseley	Rep.	Beloit
12	Rusk & Sawyer		A. C. Schultz	Rep.	Bruce
27	Sauk		Carl Koenig	Rep.	Loganville
14	Shawano		August Beversdorf	Rep.	Belle Plaine
20	Sheboygan	1	Ernst A. Sonnemann	Rep.	Sheboygan
20	Sheboygan	2	John Mentink	Rep.	Cedar Grove
10	St. Croix		Ethan B. Minier	Rep.	New Richmond
24	Taylor		J. C. Hoffman	Rep.	Medford
32	Trempealeau		George Schmidt	Rep.	Arcadia
16	Vernon		August E. Smith	Rep.	Viroqua
22	Walworth		Frank E. Lawson	Rep.	Walworth
13	Washington		Jacob Leicht	Rep.	Germantown
33	Waukesha	1	Evan G. Davies	Rep.	Wales
33	Waukesha	2	W. H. Edwards	Rep.	Sussex
23	Waupaca		George W. Meggers	Rep.	Clintonville
19	Winnebago	1	John C. Thompson Jr.	Rep.	Oshkosh
19	Winnebago	2	Nels Larson	Rep.	Neenah
24	Wood		Elwyn E. Royce	Rep.	Marshfield

== Committees ==
=== Senate committees ===
- Senate Standing Committee on Agriculture, Labor, and Industries – H. J. Severson, chair
- Senate Standing Committee on Committees – A. E. Garey, chair
- Senate Standing Committee on Contingent Expenditures – H. J. F. Bilgrien, chair
- Senate Standing Committee on Corporations and Taxation – O. H. Johnson, chair
- Senate Standing Committee on Education and Public Welfare – C. B. Casperson, chair
- Senate Standing Committee on Highways – J. E. Cashman, chair
- Senate Standing Committee on the Judiciary – M. W. Heck, chair
- Senate Standing Committee on State and Local Government – J. L. Barber, chair

=== Assembly committees ===
- Assembly Standing Committee on Agriculture – A. Holly, chair
- Assembly Standing Committee on Commerce and Manufactures – A. M. Warden, chair
- Assembly Standing Committee on Contingent Expenditures – H. W. Stokes, chair
- Assembly Standing Committee on Education – G. Slack, chair
- Assembly Standing Committee on Elections – A. Beversdorf, chair
- Assembly Standing Committee on Engrossed Bills – E. E. Royce, chair
- Assembly Standing Committee on Enrolled Bills – T. Swanson, chair
- Assembly Standing Committee on Excise and Fees – G. W. Meggers, chair
- Assembly Standing Committee on Fish and Game – F. E. Moul, chair
- Assembly Standing Committee on Highways – F. A. Frederick, chair
- Assembly Standing Committee on Insurance and Banking – C. G. Price, chair
- Assembly Standing Committee on the Judiciary – J. W. Eber, chair
- Assembly Standing Committee on Labor – A. M. Miller, chair
- Assembly Standing Committee on Municipalities – T. Engel, chair
- Assembly Standing Committee on Printing – G. Zittlow, chair
- Assembly Standing Committee on Public Welfare – M. Koenigs, chair
- Assembly Standing Committee on Revision – C. Hillman, chair
- Assembly Standing Committee on Rules – C. G. Price, chair
- Assembly Standing Committee on State Affairs – J. Goodman, chair
- Assembly Standing Committee on Taxation – G. W. Schmidt, chair
- Assembly Standing Committee on Third Reading – R. Naumann, chair
- Assembly Standing Committee on Transportation – E. B. Minier, chair

=== Joint committees ===
- Joint Standing Committee on Finance – G. Staudenmayer (Sen.) & G. A. Nelson (Asm.), co-chairs

== Employees ==
=== Senate employees ===
- Chief Clerk: F. W. Schoenfeld
  - Assistant Chief Clerk: Charles E. Mullen
- Sergeant-at-Arms: Charles A. Leicht
  - Assistant Sergeant-at-Arms: Carl A. Pfeiffer
- Postmaster: William A. Kuehl

=== Assembly employees ===
- Chief Clerk: C. E. Shaffer
  - Journal Clerk: Max H. Albertz
- Sergeant-at-Arms: C. E. Hanson
  - Assistant Sergeant-at-Arms: Stephen P. Saunders
- Postmaster: Frank C. Densmore
