= MMPC =

MMPC may refer to:

- Michigan Mathematics Prize Competition, a math competition held in Michigan, U.S.
- Milwaukee Motion Picture Commission, the former film censor board of the city of Milwaukee, Wisconsin, U.S.
- Mitsubishi Motors Philippines, the Philippine operation of Mitsubishi Motors Corporation
- Monday Morning Podcast, a podcast by American comedian Bill Burr
- Multimedia PC, a recommended configuration for a personal computer with a CD-ROM drive
- The gene (mmpC) and protein (MmpC) involved in biosynthesis of Mupirocin
