= Leander J. Pierson =

American businessman

Leander J. Pierson (November 29, 1872 – October 21, 1935) was an American politician and quarryman.

Born in Oshkosh, Wisconsin, Pierson went to Oshkosh Normal School (now University of Wisconsin–Oshkosh). He was in the quarrying business in Milwaukee, Wisconsin. From 1908 to 1910, Pierson served on the Milwaukee Common Council. In 1918, he ran for the 13th district of the Wisconsin State Assembly (Milwaukee's 13th Ward) as a Democrat against Republican incumbent Hugo Jeske and Socialist John M. Sell, coming in second to Sells' 1,057 votes but ahead of Jeske's 677.

In 1920, Pierson ran against Sells again, this time as a Republican (there was no Democratic candidate), and beat Sells with 2,894 votes to Sells' 2,031. He was assigned to the standing committees on state affairs and on transportation, chairing the latter. He ran for re-election in 1922 as a Republican, but in a fierce contest (Victor Berger was reported to have said, "Mr. Leander Pierson belongs in the legislature of Pennsylvania, or New York, or Hell-- but not in Wisconsin!") was unseated by Socialist Richard Elsner, who won with 1,679 votes to Pierson's 1,667.

Pierson died of a stroke October 21, 1935 in Bedford, Virginia.
