= John M. Sell =

American politician

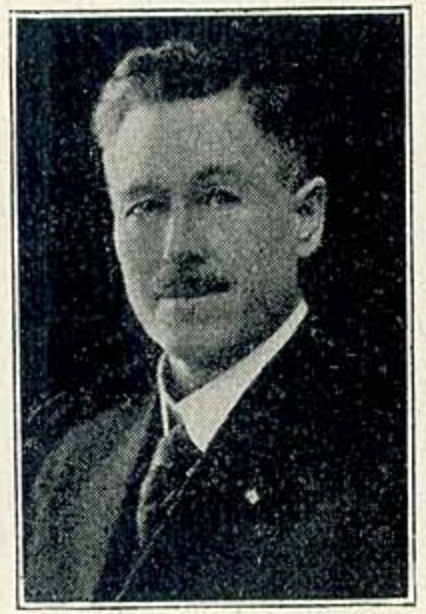
John M. Sell, painter, decorator, union activist and Socialist legislator

John M. Sell (October 9, 1863 – September 19, 1930) was an American house painter, interior decorator and trade union activist from Milwaukee, Wisconsin who served one term as a Socialist member of the Wisconsin State Assembly.

== Background ==
Sell was born October 9, 1863, in Concord, Wisconsin. He attended the Concord and Fifth Ward of Milwaukee public schools, and Hoffman's Business College in Milwaukee, after which he learned the house painting trade. He had been an interior decorator and a member of the Painter's Union for 19 years, had been a trustee for years, and was a member of the executive board, when elected to the Assembly.

== Legislative service ==
Sell was elected in 1918, to represent the Thirteenth Milwaukee County district (the 13th Ward of the City of Milwaukee), receiving 1,057 votes to 958 for Democrat Leander J. Pierson (Dem.) and 677 for incumbent Republican Assemblyman Hugo Jeske. He was assigned to the standing committee on transportation.

He ran for re-election in 1920, but was defeated by Pierson (now running as a Republican; there was no Democratic candidate), who won 2894 votes to 2031 for Sell.

== Death ==
He died Milwaukee in September 1930 from injuries sustained in a fall, and was buried on September 22.
