= Ephraim Moravian Church =

Historic church in Wisconsin, United States

- U.S. National Register of Historic Places
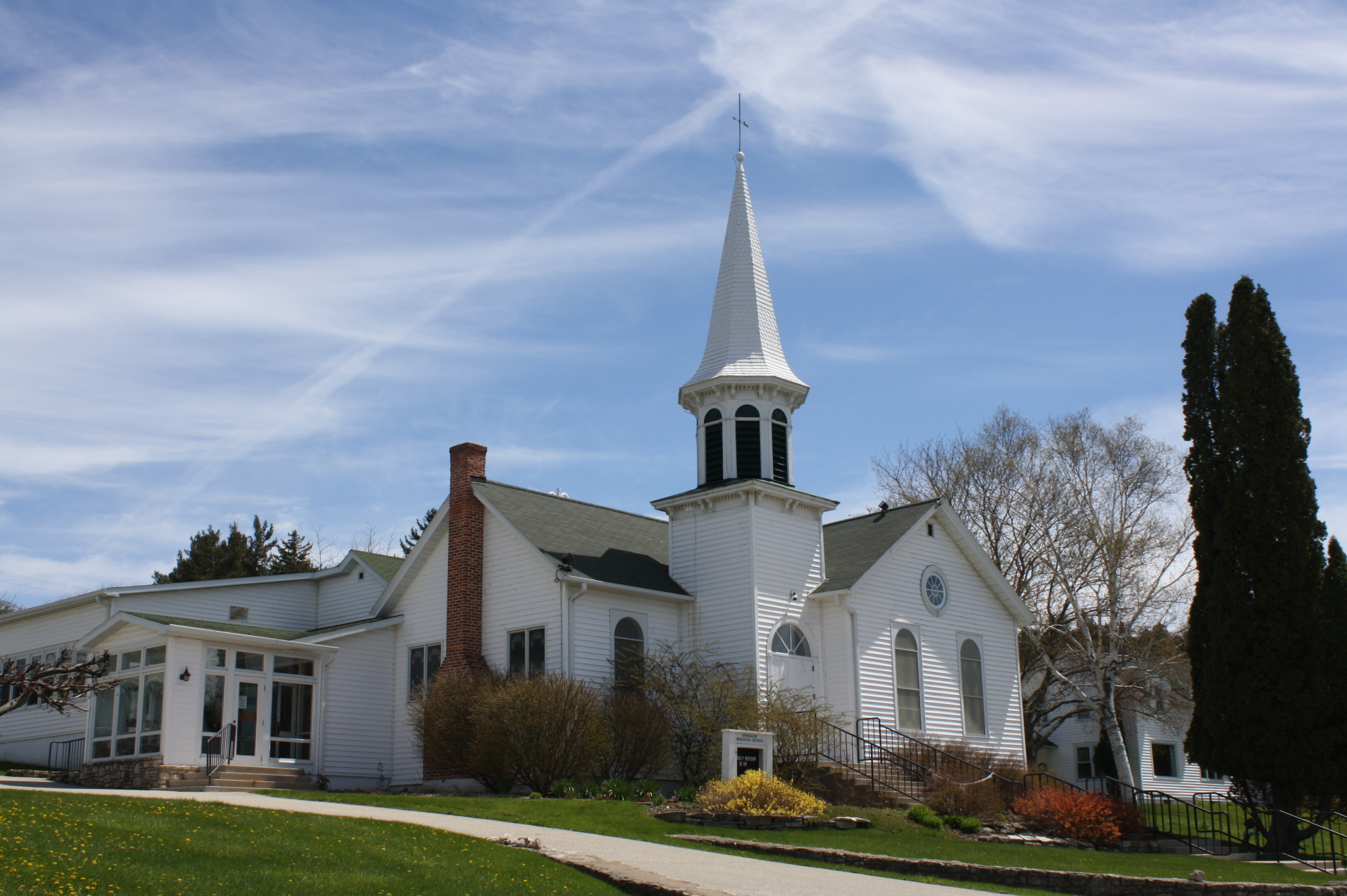
- Ephraim Moravian Church
- Location: 9970 Moravia St. Ephraim, Door County, Wisconsin
- Coordinates: 45.15475°N 87.1689°W
- Built: 1857-1859
- NRHP reference No.: 85000662
- Added to NRHP: March 27, 1985

Ephraim Moravian Church is located in Ephraim, Wisconsin. It was added to the National Register of Historic Places in 1985.

== History ==
The church was founded by Norwegian immigrant Andreas Iverson. Originally located on the shore of Eagle Harbor in Ephraim, the church was moved to its present location in 1883.
