= 1916 United States Senate election in Wisconsin =

- November 7, 1916
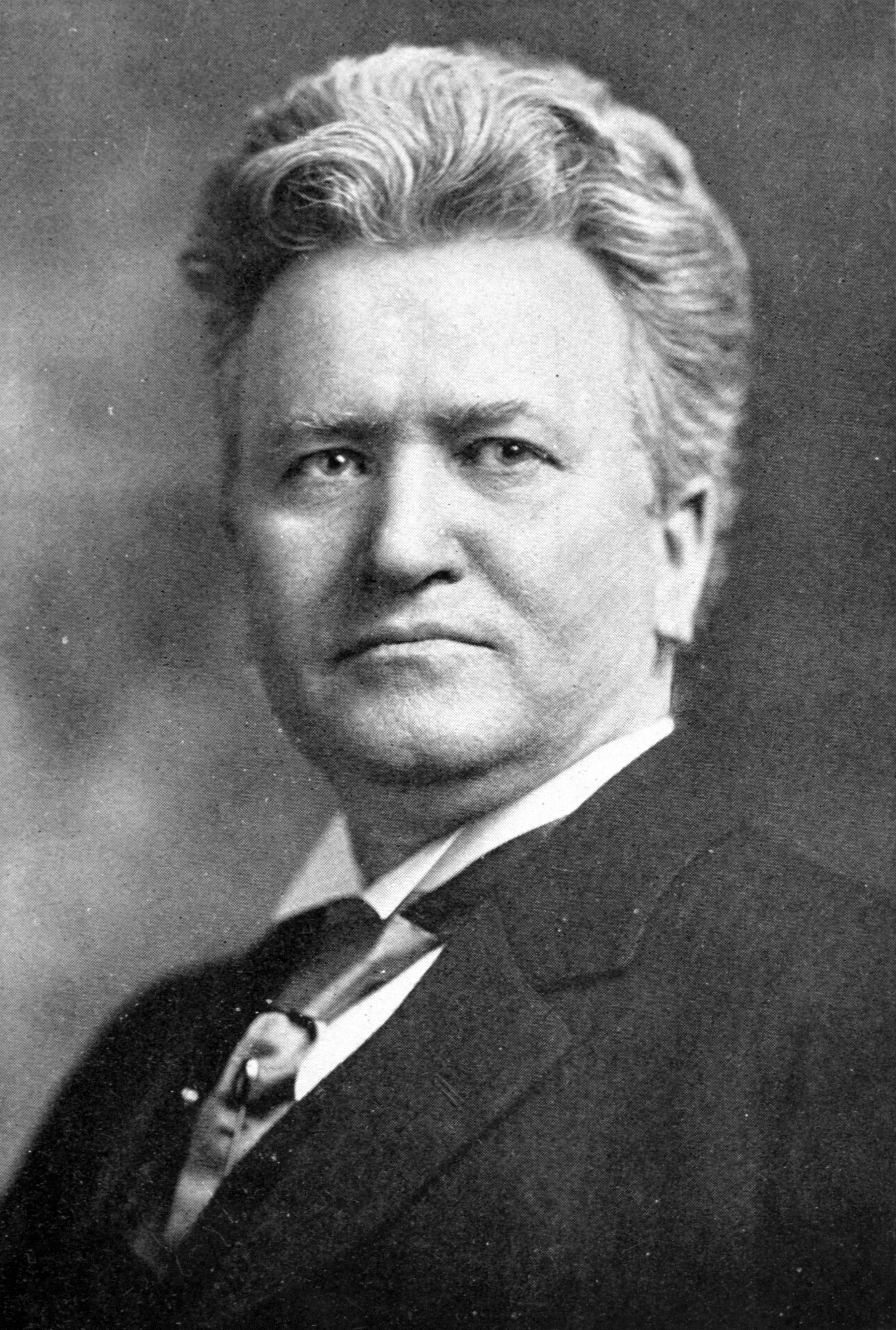

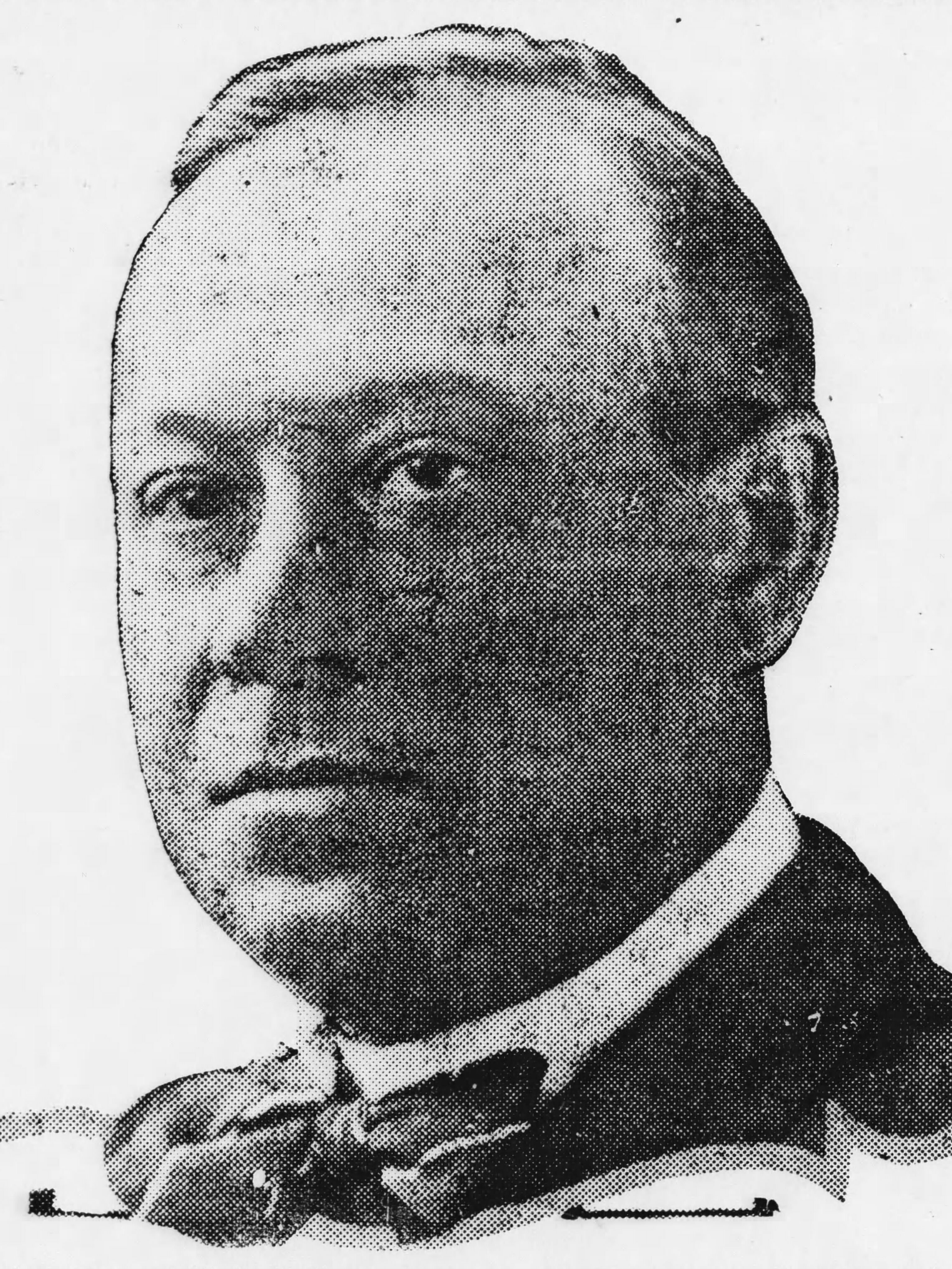

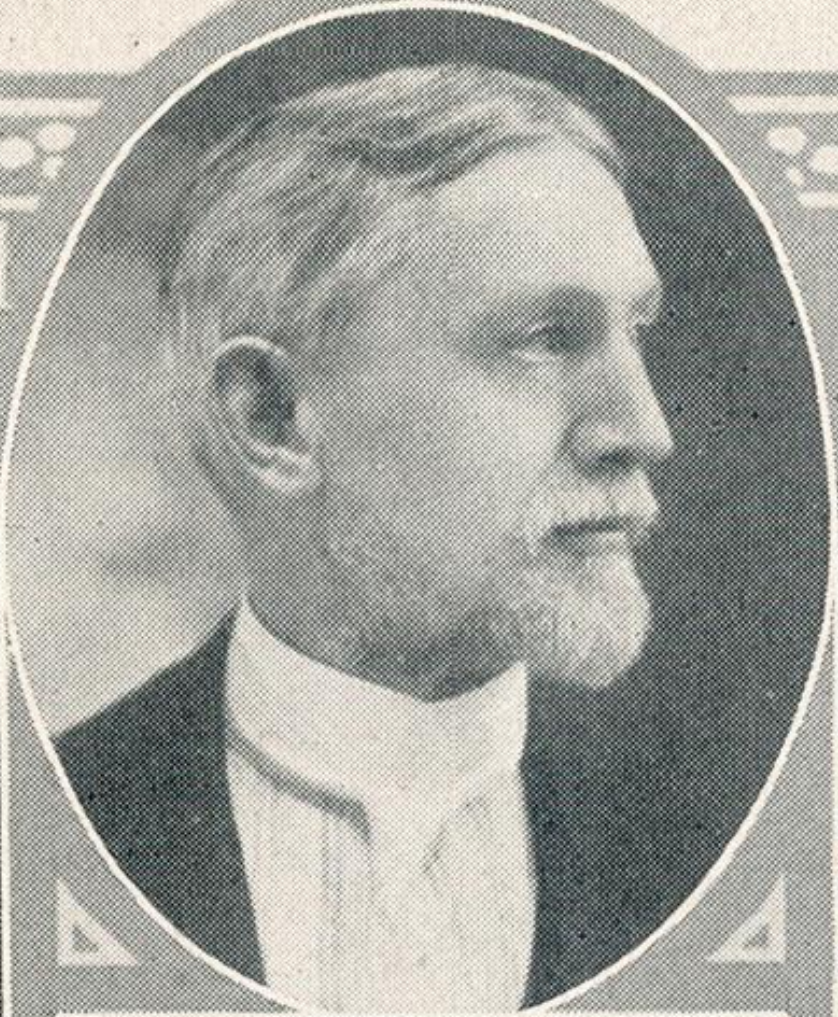
Nominee	Robert M. La Follette	William F. Wolfe	Richard Elsner
Party	Republican	Democratic	Social-Democratic
Popular vote	249,906	134,611	28,908
Percentage	59.23%	31.90%	6.85%
- County results La Follette: 40–50% 50–60% 60–70% 70–80% 80–90% Wolfe: 40–50% 50–60%
U.S. senator before election
Robert M. La Follette
Republican
Elected U.S. Senator
Robert M. La Follette
Republican

The 1916 United States Senate election in Wisconsin was held on November 7, 1916.

Incumbent Republican U.S. Senator Robert M. La Follette was re-elected to a third term in office over Democrat William F. Wolfe and Social-Democrat Richard Elsner.

== Republican primary ==
=== Candidates ===
- Malcomb G. Jeffris
- Robert M. La Follette, incumbent Senator since 1906

=== Results ===
1916 Republican U.S. Senate primary
Party	Candidate	Votes	%
Republican	Robert M. La Follette (incumbent)	99,720	59.97%
Republican	Malcomb G. Jeffris	66,576	40.03%
Total votes		166,296	100.00%

== Democratic primary ==
=== Candidates ===
- William F. Wolfe, U.S. Attorney for the Western District of Wisconsin

=== Results ===
1916 Democratic U.S. Senate primary
Party	Candidate	Votes	%
Democratic	William F. Wolfe	36,795	100.00%
Total votes		36,795	100.00%

== Social-Democratic primary ==
=== Candidates ===
- Richard Elsner, Milwaukee County judge

=== Results ===
1916 Social-Democratic U.S. Senate primary
Party	Candidate	Votes	%
Social-Democratic	Richard Elsner	11,479	100.00%
Total votes		11,479	100.00%

== Prohibition primary ==
=== Candidates ===
- Charles L. Hill

=== Results ===
1916 Prohibition U.S. Senate primary
Party	Candidate	Votes	%
Prohibition	Charles L. Hill	1,801	100.00%
Total votes		1,801	100.00%

== General election ==
=== Candidates ===
- Charles L. Hill (Prohibition)
- William F. Wolfe, U.S. Attorney for the Western District of Wisconsin (Democratic)
- Robert M. La Follette, incumbent Senator since 1906 (Republican)
- Richard Elsner, Milwaukee County judge (Social-Democratic)

=== Results ===
1916 U.S. Senate election in Wisconsin
Party	Candidate	Votes	%
Republican	Robert M. La Follette (incumbent)	251,303	59.23%
Democratic	William F. Wolfe	135,144	31.90%
Social-Democratic	Richard Elsner	28,908	6.85%
Prohibition	Charles L. Hill	3,523	2.39%
Write-in		66	0.02%
Total votes		423,949	100.00%
Republican hold			

== See also ==
- 1916 United States Senate elections
