= Bethany Lutheran Church, Ephraim =

Historic church in Wisconsin, United States

- Bethania Scandinavian Evangelical Lutheran Congregation
- U.S. National Register of Historic Places
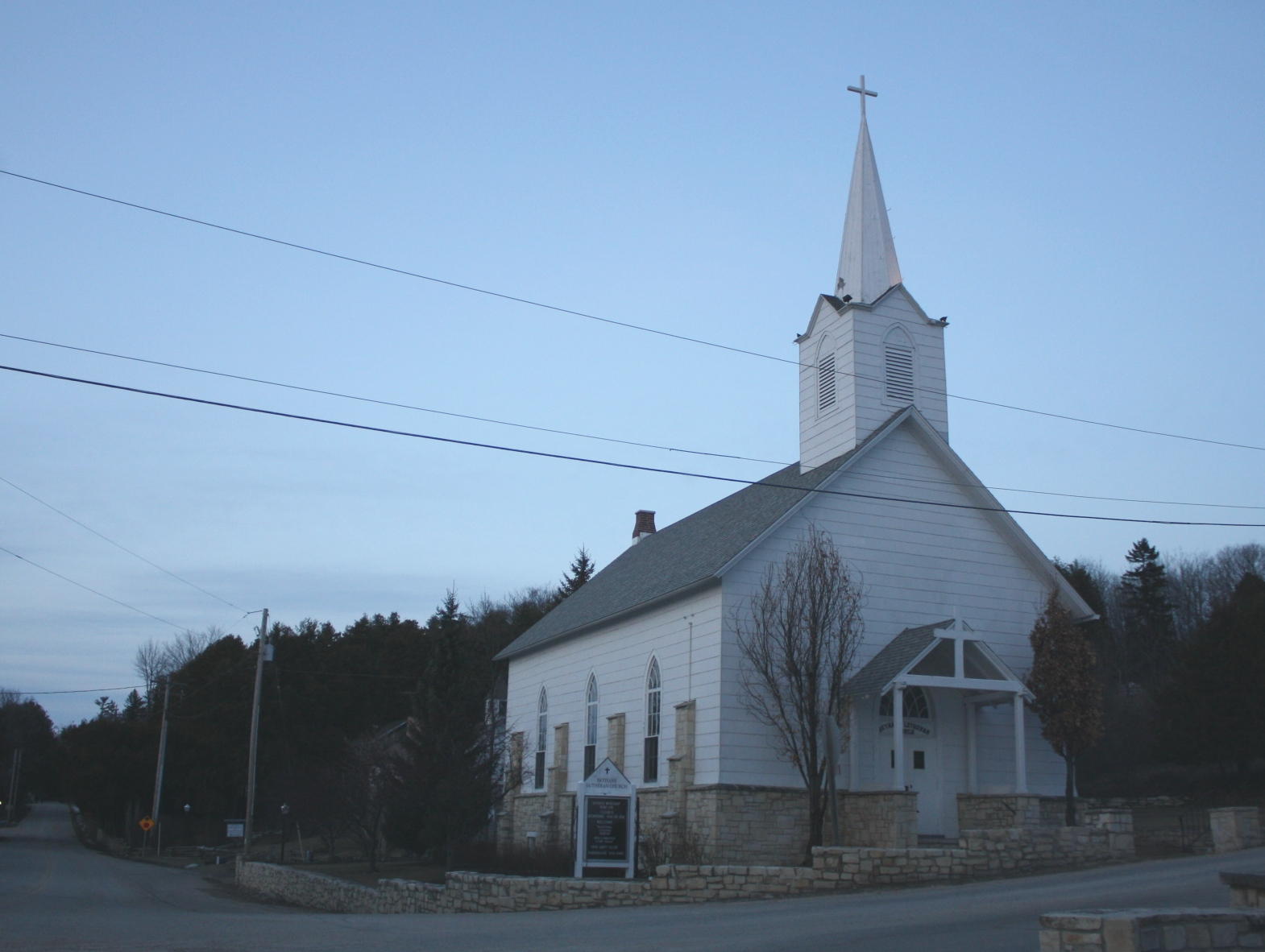
- Free Evangelical Lutheran Church-Bethania Scandinavian Evangelical Lutheran Congregation
- Location: 3028 Church St. Ephraim, Wisconsin
- Coordinates: 45.15553°N 87.1689°W
- Built: 1882
- Architectural style: Gothic Revival
- NRHP reference No.: 85000664
- Added to NRHP: March 27, 1985

Bethania Scandinavian Evangelical Lutheran Congregation is located in Ephraim, a village in Door County, Wisconsin. The church building was added to the National Register of Historic Places in 1985. Today, the church is known as Bethany Lutheran Church of Ephraim.

In 1882, six families established the Free Evangelical Lutheran Church. Within weeks, a new church building took shape. When the building was dedicated in 1882, Rev. John Torgerson, an independent Lutheran minister from Chicago, conducted the service. From 1895 to 1897, the church was affiliated with the Augustana Synod. In 1898, it became affiliated with the United Lutheran Church in America and the name of the church was changed officially to Bethania Scandinavian Evangelical Lutheran Congregation. By that date, services were conducted in the Norwegian language.
