= Peter Peterson House =

Historic house in Wisconsin, United States

- U.S. National Register of Historic Places
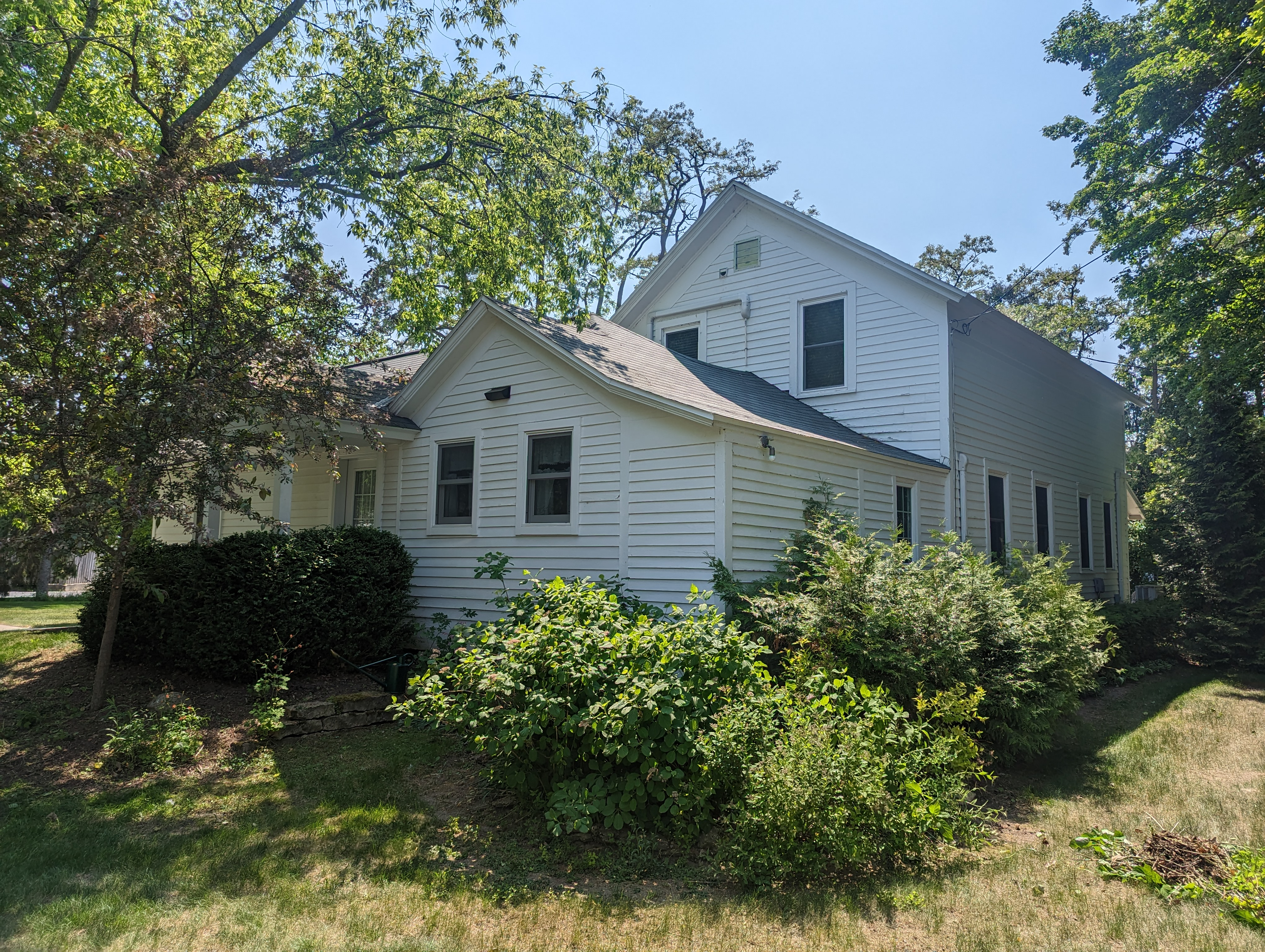
- The Peter Peterson House, also known as the Bethany Lutheran Parsonage
- Location: 10020 N. Cedar St., Ephraim, Wisconsin
- Coordinates: 45°09′28″N 87°10′14″W
- Area: less than one acre
- Built: 1874
- MPS: Ephraim MRA (Archived August 10, 2018)
- NRHP reference No.: 85000666
- Added to NRHP: March 27, 1985

The Peter Peterson House is located in Ephraim, Wisconsin.

== History ==
Peter Peterson was a Norwegian immigrant. He would become a prominent merchant and politician and would help to found a local Lutheran church. Originally his private residence, Peterson eventually donated the house to the church. Since then, it has been used as a parsonage. The building is commonly known as the Bethany Lutheran Parsonage.

It was listed on the National Register of Historic Places in 1985 and on the State Register of Historic Places in 1989.
