= Prairie Farm (town), Wisconsin =

Town in Barron County, Wisconsin

Prairie Farm, Wisconsin
- Town
- Town of Prairie Farm
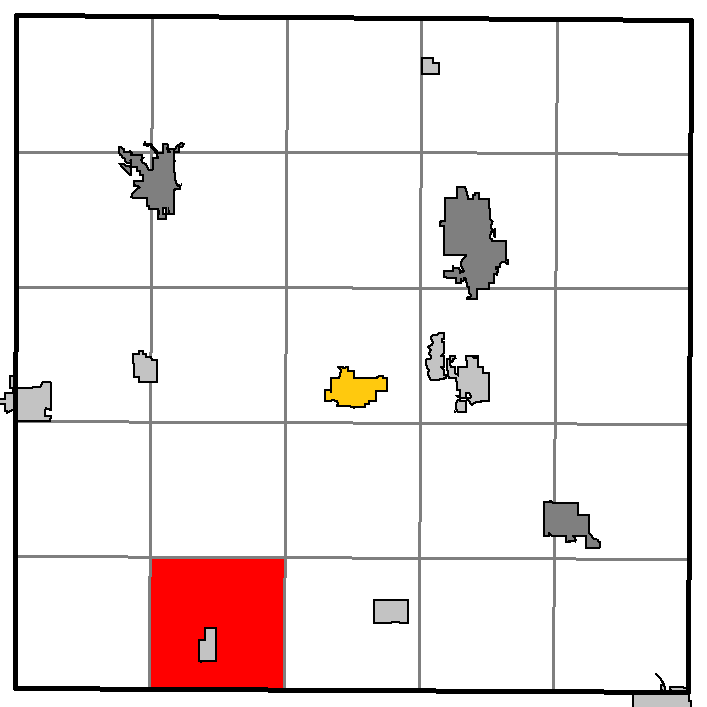
- Location of Prairie Farm, within Barron County, Wisconsin

- Location of Barron County, Wisconsin
- Coordinates: 45°15′26″N 91°57′56″W
- Country: United States
- State: Wisconsin
- County: Barron

Area
  - Total: 34.33 sq mi (88.9 km^{2})
  - Land: 34.33 sq mi (88.9 km^{2})
  - Water: 0.002 sq mi (0.0052 km^{2})

Population (2020)
  - Total: 566
  - Density: 16.5/sq mi (6.37/km^{2})
- Time zone: UTC-6 (Central (CST))
  - Summer (DST): UTC-5 (CDT)
- ZIP Code: 54762
- Area code(s): 715 & 534
- GNIS feature ID: 1583976

Prairie Farm is a town in Barron County in the U.S. state of Wisconsin. The population was 566 at the 2020 census, down from 573 at the 2010 census. The village of Prairie Farm is surrounded by the town.

== Geography ==
The town of Prairie Farm is located in southwestern Barron County, with its southern side bordered by Dunn County. The village of Prairie Farm is located south of the geographic center of the town and is a separate entity from the town. The Hay River, a tributary of the Red Cedar River, flows from north to south through the town.

According to the United States Census Bureau, the town has a total area of 34.5 square miles (89.3 km^{2}), all land.

== Demographics ==
As of the census of 2000, there were 603 people, 204 households, and 165 families residing in the town. The population density was 17.5 people per square mile (6.8/km^{2}). There were 222 housing units at an average density of 6.5 per square mile (2.5/km^{2}). The racial makeup of the town was 99% White, 0.5% Asian, and 0.5% from two or more races.

There were 204 households, out of which 40.7% had children under the age of 18 living with them, 74% were married couples living together, 3.4% had a female householder with no husband present, and 19.1% were non-families. 14.7% of all households were made up of individuals, and 6.4% had someone living alone who was 65 years of age or older. The average household size was 2.96 and the average family size was 3.31.

In the town, the population was spread out, with 30.3% under the age of 18, 6% from 18 to 24, 29.4% from 25 to 44, 25.2% from 45 to 64, and 9.1% who were 65 years of age or older. The median age was 37 years. For every 100 females, there were 110.1 males. For every 100 females age 18 and over, there were 104.9 males.

The median income for a household in the town was $45,417, and the median income for a family was $53,000. Males had a median income of $31,125 versus $23,056 for females. The per capita income for the town was $21,295. None of the families and 2.7% of the population were living below the poverty line, including no under eighteens and 18.6% of those over 64.

== Notable people ==
- Frank Roemhild, Wisconsin State Representative, farmer, and businessman, lived in the town
