= Henry A. Staab =

American politician

Henry A. Staab (born April 19, 1875), was an American politician from Milwaukee, Wisconsin, who served as a member of the Wisconsin State Assembly. A member of the Knights of Pythias, he would become Grand Chancellor of Wisconsin.

== Career ==
Staab was elected to the Assembly in 1924 and re-elected in 1926. Additionally, he was appointed to the Milwaukee Motion Picture Commission in 1920. He was a Republican.
