= Richard Elsner =

American politician

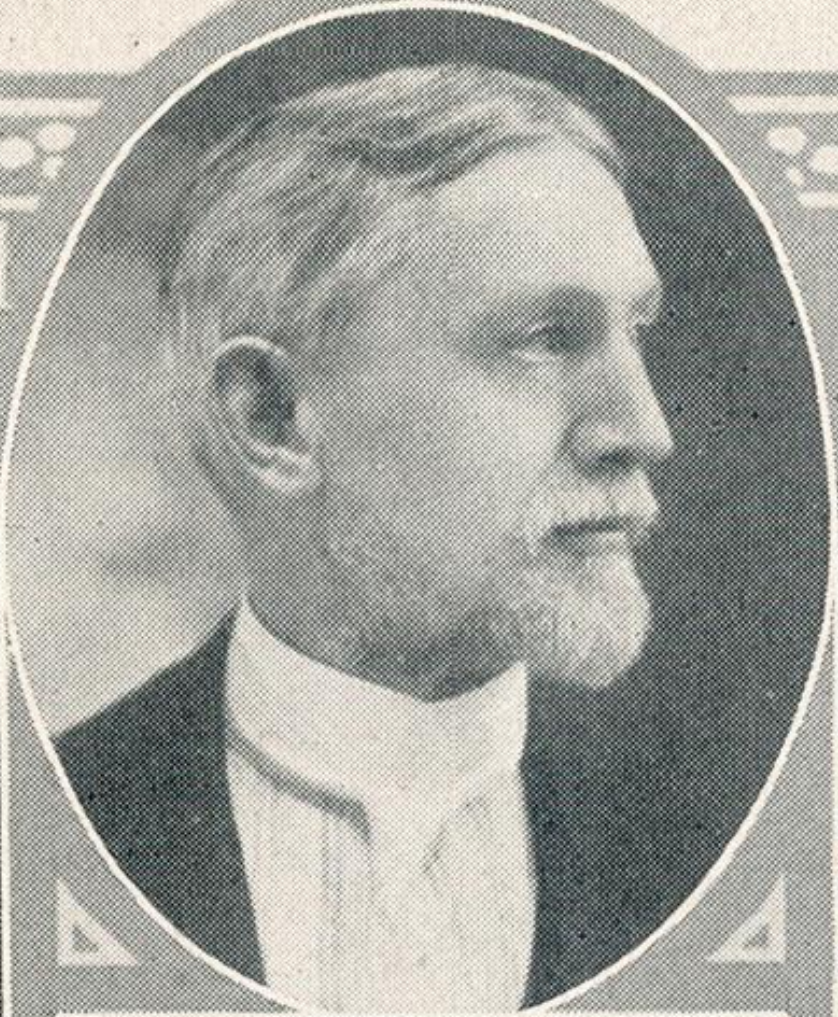
Richard Elsner

Richard Elsner (May 29, 1859 – January 18, 1938) was an American attorney and judge from Milwaukee, Wisconsin, who served one term as a Socialist member of the Wisconsin State Assembly.

== Background ==
Elsner was born May 29, 1859, in Silesia. He attended public school, gymnasium and technical college in Germany. He came to Milwaukee in 1880 and became a leader of the Brewery Workers Union by 1886. Later he attended Marquette University and the University of Wisconsin Law School where he graduated in 1894, becoming a self-described "practicing lawyer by profession."

== Politics and public office ==
By 1898, he was the Socialist nominee for Attorney General of Wisconsin, coming in fifth in a six-way race. In 1900, he was again the nominee, placing fourth in a five-way race; by 1902, he had moved up to third in another five-way race, repeating the performance in 1906.

He was a county judge of Milwaukee County from 1910 to 1916. In 1916 he was the Socialist nominee for the United States Senate, coming in third in a four-way race in which incumbent Republican Robert M. La Follette, Sr. was re-elected. In 1919 Elsner was elected register of deeds of Milwaukee County for the first of two terms. He was elected a member of the assembly in November, 1922 in a fierce contest (Victor Berger was reported to have said, "Mr. Leander Pierson belongs in the legislature of Pennsylvania, or New York, or Hell-- but not in Wisconsin!"), receiving 1,679 votes to incumbent Republican Leander J. Pierson's 1663 votes. He was appointed to the standing committees on the judiciary and on insurance and banking.

In 1924 he was not a candidate for re-election, and was succeeded by Republican Ernst F. Pahl.

== After legislative service ==
His papers are in the Special Collections of the Golda Meir Library of the University of Wisconsin–Milwaukee.
