= William F. Wolfe =

American lawyer (1868–1917)

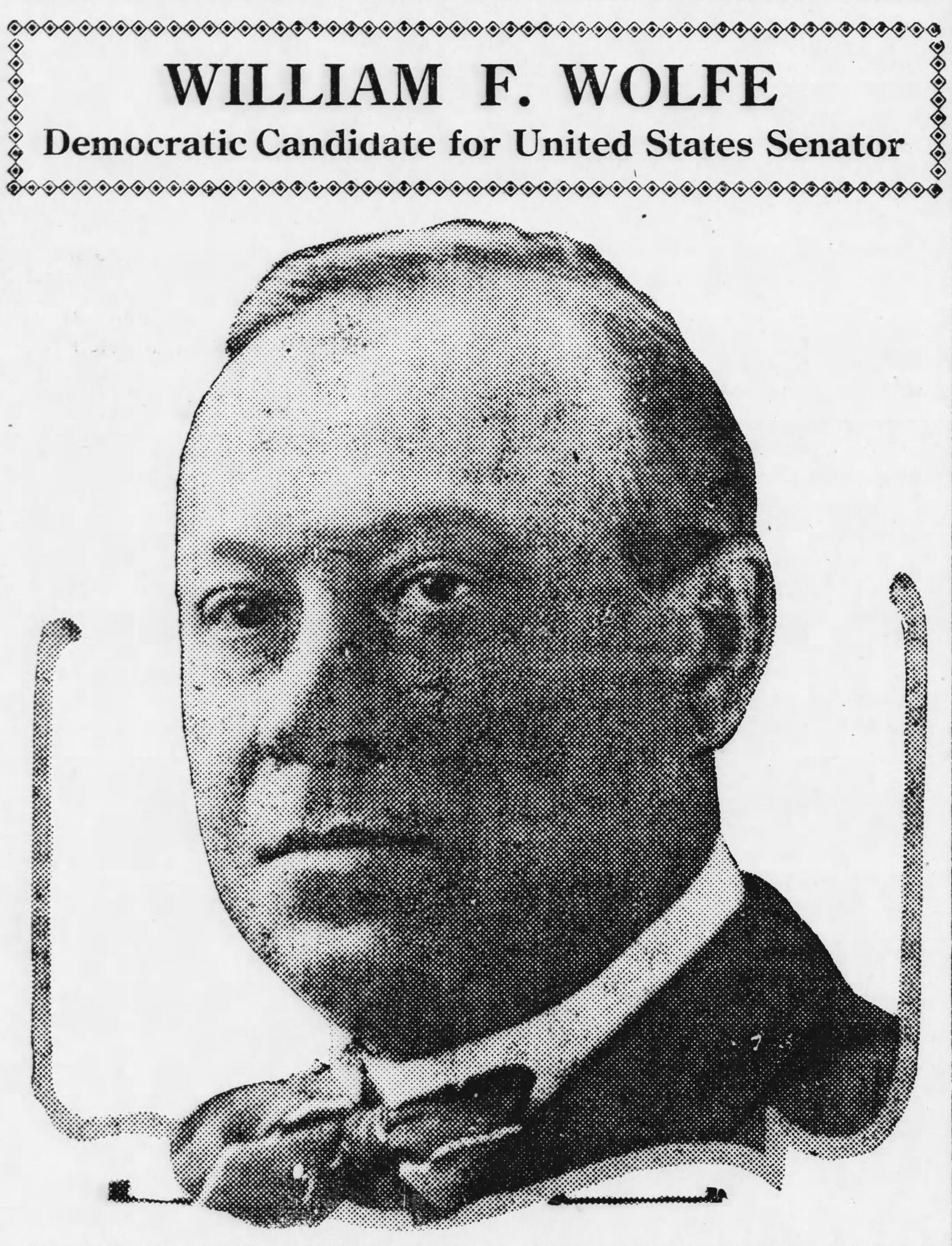
- Wolfe in 1916

United States Attorney for the Western District of Wisconsin
- In office December 1916 – January 10, 1917 (died)
- Appointed by: Woodrow Wilson
- Preceded by: Arthur Mulberger
- Succeeded by: Albert C. Wolfe

Personal details
- Born: August 30, 1868 Greenville, Wisconsin, U.S.
- Died: January 10, 1917 (aged 48) Madison, Wisconsin, U.S.
- Cause of death: Stroke
- Resting place: Oak Grove Cemetery, La Crosse
- Party: Democratic
- Spouse: Margaret Lamont (m. 1894–1917)
- Education: University of Wisconsin
- Profession: Lawyer

William Frederick Wolfe (August 30, 1868 – January 10, 1917) was an American lawyer and Democratic politician from La Crosse, Wisconsin. He was a leader of the Democratic Party of Wisconsin in his era, and was the Democratic nominee for U.S. Senate in 1916. He served briefly as United States Attorney for the Western District of Wisconsin from December 1916 until his sudden death in January 1917. Before completing his legal education, he was a political journalist, working as a correspondent for the Milwaukee Journal and an editor for the Madison Democrat.

== Biography ==
Wolfe was a member of the Platform and Resolutions Committee of the 1912 Democratic National Convention and would go on to be a member of the Committee on Rules and Order of Business of the 1916 Democratic National Convention. Also in 1916, Wolfe was a candidate for the United States Senate. He lost to incumbent Robert M. La Follette Sr.

Shortly after his loss in the 1916 election, his former law partner John A. Aylward died after having been nominated for United States Attorney; President Wilson then nominated Wolfe to become U.S. attorney for the Western District of Wisconsin. Wolfe was confirmed to the role in December 1916.

During that same time, Wolfe suffered from Appendicitis and underwent emergency surgery. He died of a stroke while giving a rousing political speech at a dinner for the Democratic Party of Wisconsin state central committee in Madison, Wisconsin, on the evening of January 10, 1917.

Party political offices
Preceded by Charles H. Weisse	Democratic nominee for U.S. Senator from Wisconsin (Class 1); 1916	Succeeded by Jessie Jack Hooper
