= Ephraim Village Hall =

- U.S. National Register of Historic Places
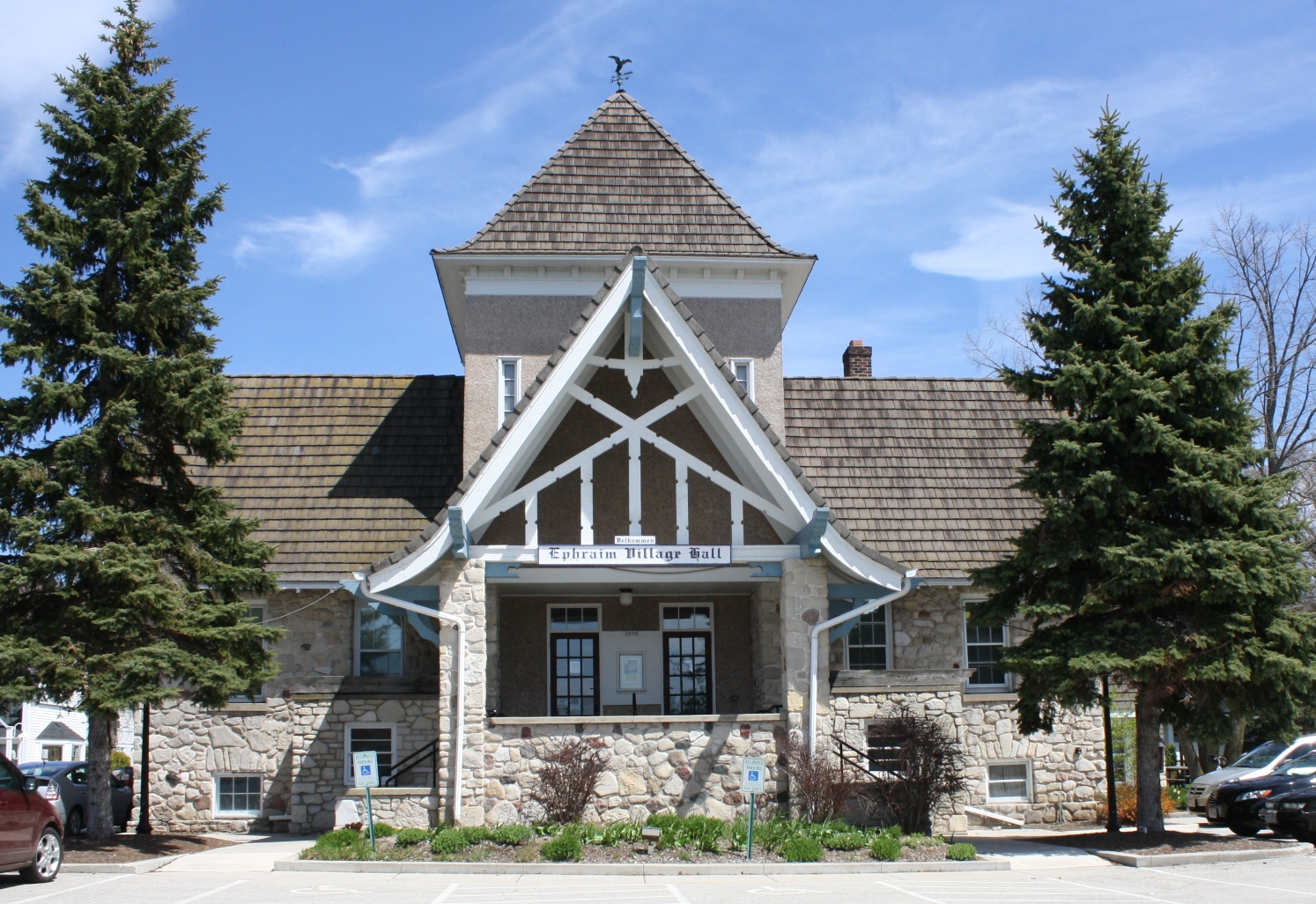
- Ephraim Village Hall
- Location: 9996 S. Water St., Ephraim, Door County, Wisconsin
- Coordinates: 45°09′22″N 87°10′16″W
- Area: less than one acre
- Built: 1927
- Architect: Henry Anschutz
- Architectural style: Arts and Crafts
- MPS: Ephraim MRA
- NRHP reference No.: 85000663
- Added to NRHP: March 27, 1985

The Ephraim Village Hall is located in Ephraim, Wisconsin.

== History ==
Originally to house municipal functions, the building has also been used as a library and for various social functions. It was listed on the National Register of Historic Places in 1985 and on the State Register of Historic Places in 1989.
