= Erick H. Johnson =

American politician

Erick H. Johnson (April 10, 1865 – January 3, 1926) was an American farmer, merchant, teacher, and politician.

Born in Hogfors, Finland, then part of the Russian Empire. Johnson emigrated with his family to the United States in 1868 and settled in Peshtigo, Wisconsin for one year. He went to the public school and then went to Gustavus Adolphus College for one year. Johnson taught school in Minnesota and Wisconsin. He lived in Frederic, Wisconsin and was a farmer and merchant. Johnson served as town clerk, town treasurer, and town assessor. He also served as justice of the peace and was postmaster of Frederic during the administration of President William McKinley. Johnson served on the county school committee in 1917 and 1918 and was a Republican. From 1921 until his death in 1926, he served in the Wisconsin State Assembly. Johnson died at his home after a long illness.
