= Eagle Harbor (Wisconsin) =

Small harbor in Wisconsin, United States

Coordinates: 45.158°N 87.182°W

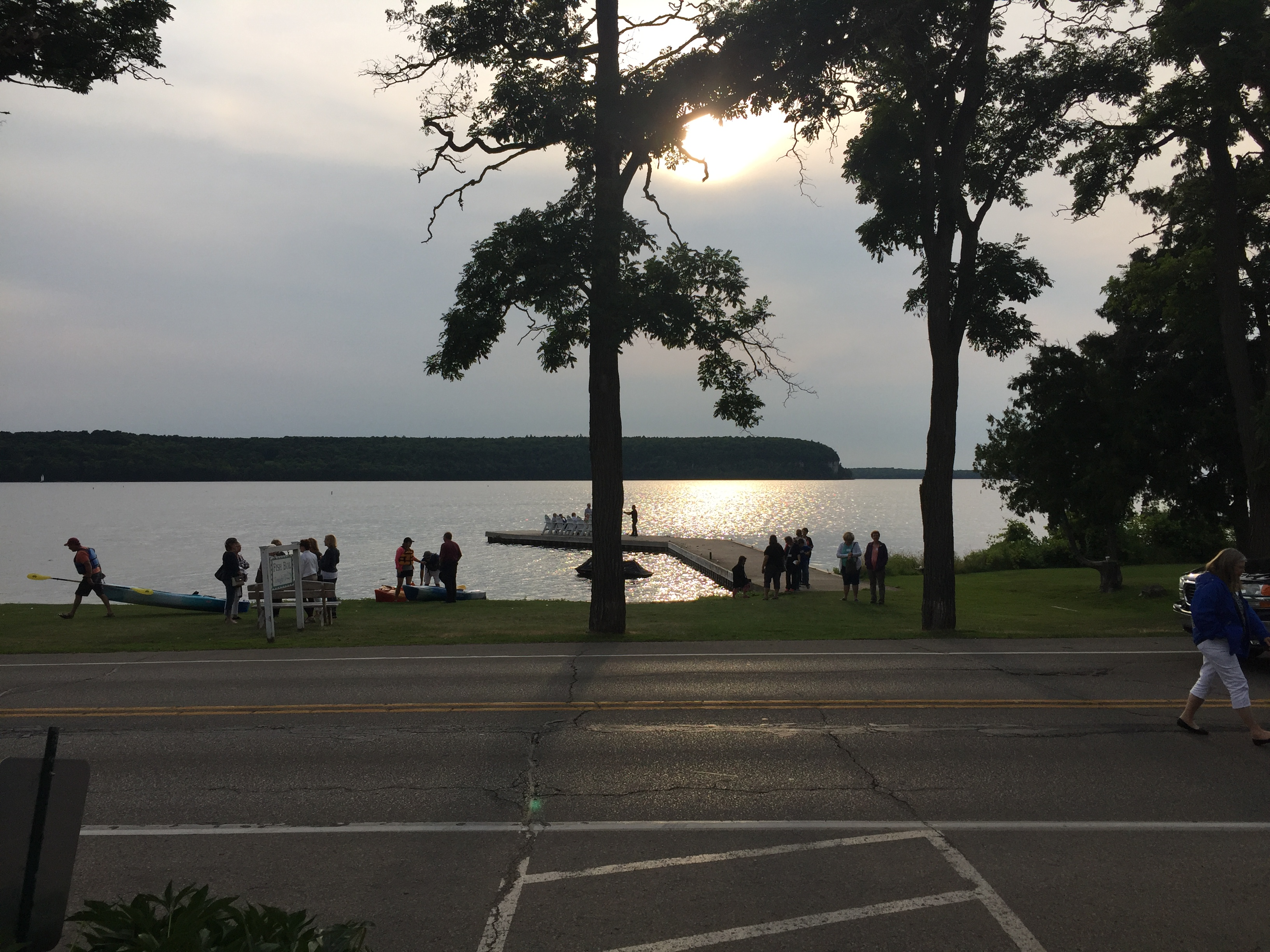
View from Ephraim, Wisconsin across Eagle Harbor, toward Peninsula State Park

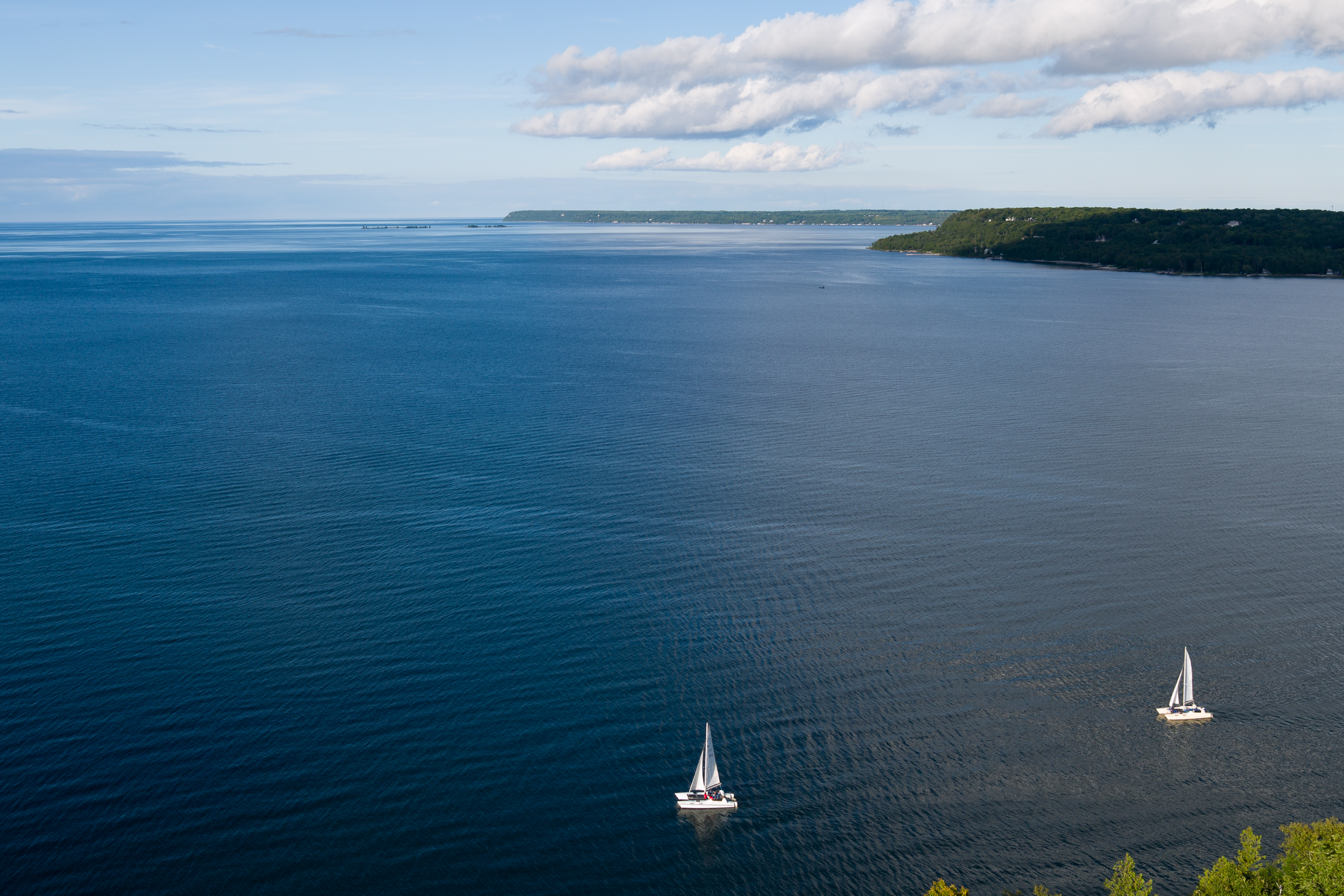
View from Peninsula State Park, from a former observation tower

Eagle Harbor is a small harbor in Door County in the U.S. state of Wisconsin. It is located on the eastern side of Green Bay, an arm of Lake Michigan. The harbor is approximately 2.5 square miles in area.

Ephraim, Wisconsin, is located on the east side of Eagle Harbor. Peninsula State Park has a coastline on the harbor.
