= Bert D. Thorp =

American politician

Bert D. Thorp (December 26, 1869 – August 18, 1937) was an American politician and businessman.

Born in Tomah, Wisconsin, Thorp went to high school. He was the assistant superintendent of the Sturgeon Bay Ship Canal and the superintendent of harbor improvements for the United States Army Corps of Engineers, Milwaukee division. Thorp operated the Eagle Inn in Ephraim, Wisconsin and the Door County Country Club in Sturgeon Bay, Wisconsin. Thorp served as president of the village of Ephraim, Wisconsin and on the Door County Board of Supervisors. In 1925, Thorp served in the Wisconsin State Assembly and was a Republican. Thorp died in Sturgeon Bay, Wisconsin.
