= Frederic, Wisconsin =

- Village
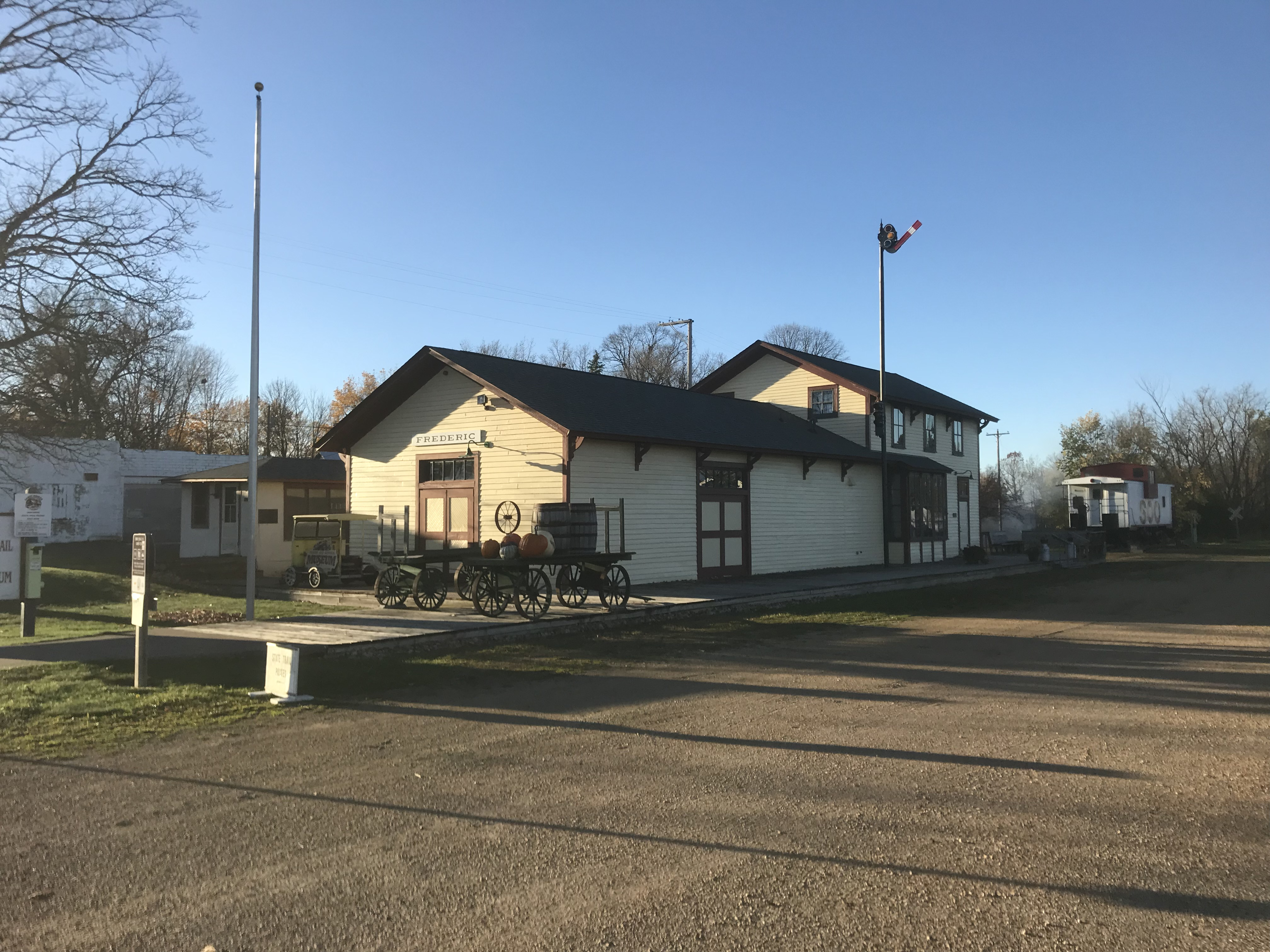
- Soo Line Depot Museum in Frederic

- Location of Frederic in Polk County, Wisconsin.
- Coordinates: 45°39′32″N 92°28′1″W
- Country: United States
- State: Wisconsin
- County: Polk

Area
  - Total: 1.76 sq mi (4.56 km^{2})
  - Land: 1.69 sq mi (4.38 km^{2})
  - Water: 0.069 sq mi (0.18 km^{2})
- Elevation: 1,210 ft (370 m)

Population (2020)
  - Total: 1,154
  - Density: 682/sq mi (263/km^{2})
- Time zone: UTC-6 (Central (CST))
  - Summer (DST): UTC-5 (CDT)
- Area codes: 715 & 534
- FIPS code: 55-27500
- GNIS feature ID: 1565283
- Website: www.fredericwi.com

Frederic is a village in Polk County, Wisconsin, United States. The population was 1,154 at the 2020 census. It was established as a village in 1901.

== Geography ==
Frederic is located at 45°39′32″N 92°28′1″W (45.658797, -92.466921).

According to the United States Census Bureau, the village has a total area of 1.79 square miles (4.64 km^{2}), of which 1.72 square miles (4.45 km^{2}) is land and 0.07 square miles (0.18 km^{2}) is water.

Frederic is along Wisconsin Highways 35 and 48, and Polk County Road W.

== Demographics ==
Historical population
| Census | Pop. | Note | %± |
|---|---|---|---|
| 1910 | 511 | | — |
| 1920 | 602 | | 17.8% |
| 1930 | 680 | | 13.0% |
| 1940 | 725 | | 6.6% |
| 1950 | 893 | | 23.2% |
| 1960 | 857 | | −4.0% |
| 1970 | 908 | | 6.0% |
| 1980 | 1,039 | | 14.4% |
| 1990 | 1,124 | | 8.2% |
| 2000 | 1,262 | | 12.3% |
| 2010 | 1,137 | | −9.9% |
| 2020 | 1,154 | | 1.5% |
U.S. Decennial Census

=== 2010 census ===
As of the census of 2010, there were 1,137 people, 496 households, and 274 families living in the village. The population density was 661.0 inhabitants per square mile (255.2/km^{2}). There were 567 housing units at an average density of 329.7 per square mile (127.3/km^{2}). The racial makeup of the village was 95.9% White, 0.3% African American, 1.7% Native American, 0.5% Asian, 0.4% from other races, and 1.3% from two or more races. Hispanic or Latino of any race were 1.1% of the population.

There were 496 households, of which 26.8% had children under the age of 18 living with them, 39.1% were married couples living together, 11.1% had a female householder with no husband present, 5.0% had a male householder with no wife present, and 44.8% were non-families. 38.9% of all households were made up of individuals, and 20.5% had someone living alone who was 65 years of age or older. The average household size was 2.16 and the average family size was 2.84.

The median age in the village was 41.4 years. 25.8% of residents were under the age of 18; 4.7% were between the ages of 18 and 24; 23.7% were from 25 to 44; 23.6% were from 45 to 64; and 22.3% were 65 years of age or older. The gender makeup of the village was 46.7% male and 53.3% female.

=== 2000 census ===
As of the census of 2000, there were 1,262 people, 536 households, and 286 families living in the village. The population density was 820.6 people per square mile (316.4/km^{2}). There were 586 housing units at an average density of 381.1 per square mile (146.9/km^{2}). The racial makeup of the village was 97.78% White, 0.08% African American, 1.19% Native American, 0.16% Asian, and 0.79% from two or more races. Hispanic or Latino of any race were 0.40% of the population.

There were 536 households, out of which 23.1% had children under the age of 18 living with them, 41.0% were married couples living together, 9.1% had a female householder with no husband present, and 46.5% were non-families. 42.2% of all households were made up of individuals, and 25.2% had someone living alone who was 65 years of age or older. The average household size was 2.15 and the average family size was 2.99.

In the village, the population was spread out, with 23.0% under the age of 18, 6.3% from 18 to 24, 22.3% from 25 to 44, 16.9% from 45 to 64, and 31.5% who were 65 years of age or older. The median age was 44 years. For every 100 females, there were 79.0 males. For every 100 females age 18 and over, there were 70.2 males.

The median income for a household in the village was $25,380, and the median income for a family was $40,000. Males had a median income of $30,987 versus $19,813 for females. The per capita income for the village was $15,685. About 5.6% of families and 10.9% of the population were below the poverty line, including 8.5% of those under age 18 and 21.1% of those age 65 or over.

== Education ==
The Frederic School District consists of Frederic Elementary School and Frederic 6-12 School, which contains Frederic Middle School and Frederic High School.

== Notable people ==
- Robert M. Dueholm, Wisconsin politician, was born in Frederic.
- Rodney Erickson, former president of Pennsylvania State University
- Nathan Heffernan, member of the Wisconsin Supreme Court, was born in Frederic.
- Erick H. Johnson, Wisconsin politician, lived in Frederic.
- Rita Lee, Playboy's Playmate for the Month of November 1977, was born in Frederic.
- Carol Merrill, a model for the original television game show Let's Make A Deal, was born in Frederic.
- Erin Gloria Ryan, writer and podcaster, was born in Frederic.
- Harvey Stower, Wisconsin politician, was born in Frederic.
