= Ephraim, Wisconsin =

- Village
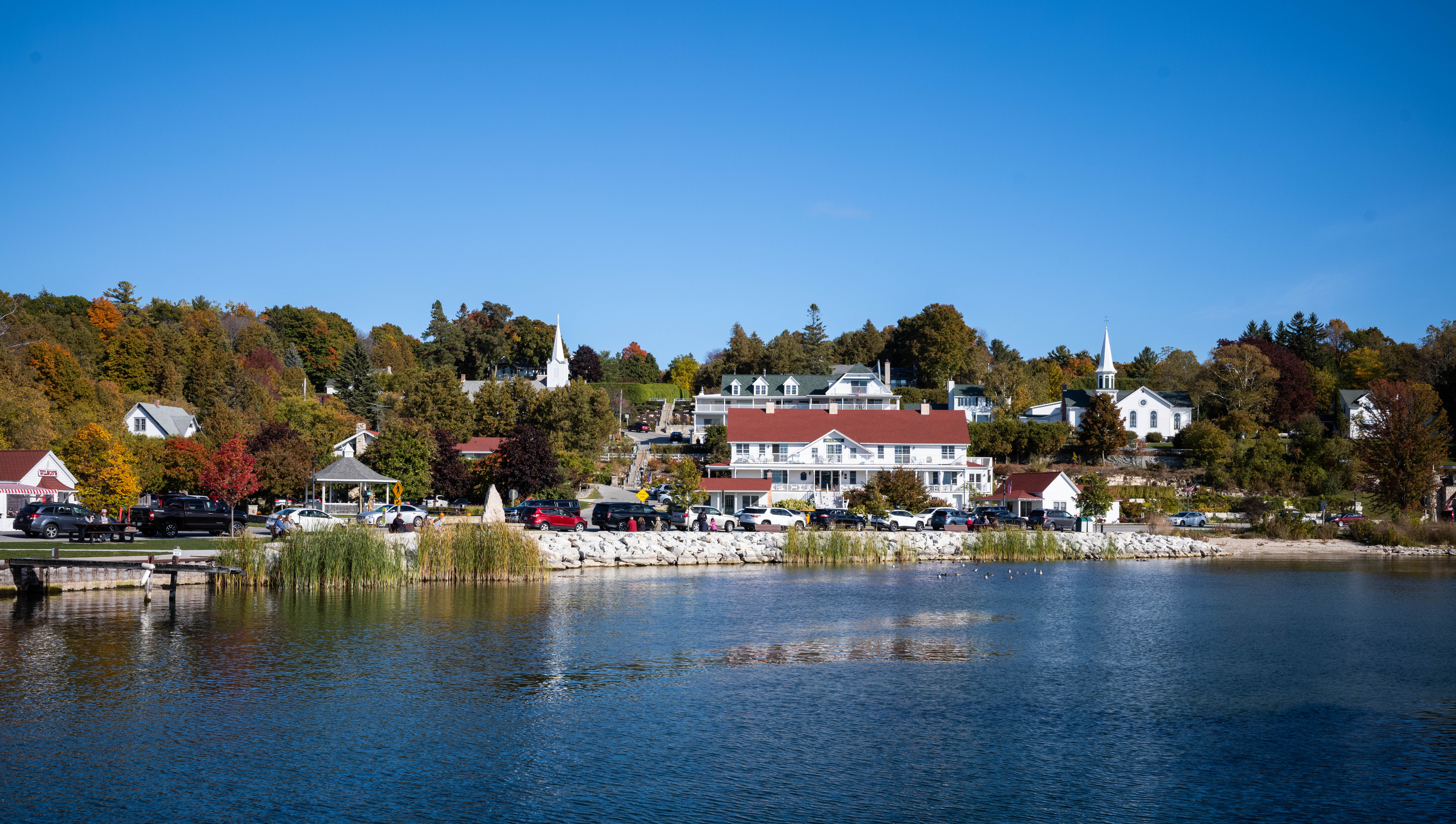
- Ephraim viewed from Eagle Harbor

- Location of Ephraim in Door County, Wisconsin.

- Location within Wisconsin Location within the United States
- Coordinates: 45°9′23″N 87°10′16″W
- Country: United States
- State: Wisconsin
- County: Door

Area
  - Total: 8.13 sq mi (21.06 km^{2})
  - Land: 3.79 sq mi (9.81 km^{2})
  - Water: 4.34 sq mi (11.25 km^{2})
- Elevation: 663 ft (202 m)

Population (2020)
  - Total: 345
  - Density: 91.1/sq mi (35.2/km^{2})
- Time zone: UTC-6 (Central (CST))
  - Summer (DST): UTC-5 (CDT)
- Area code: 920
- FIPS code: 55-24150
- GNIS feature ID: 1564680
- Website: ephraim.wi.gov

Ephraim (/ˈiːfrɑːm/ EEF-rahm) is a village in Door County, Wisconsin, United States. The population was 345 at the 2020 census. The village is known for its white buildings, its views of the bluffs across Eagle Harbor, and its shoreline along Green Bay. It is located across Eagle Harbor from Peninsula State Park.

== History ==
The village was founded in 1853 by the Reverend Andreas Iverson as a Moravian Church community. The steeples of the Ephraim Moravian Church and the Free Evangelical Lutheran Church-Bethania Scandinavian Evangelical Lutheran Congregation are the landmarks of the village as seen from Eagle Harbor. The home of Reverend Iverson, as well as the Anderson Store, the Anderson Barn and History Center, the Pioneer Schoolhouse and the Goodletson log cabin are preserved by the Ephraim Historical Foundation and open to visitors as museums. The Ephraim Historical Foundation also offers walking tours of the village.

Since its founding, the village prohibited alcohol sales or manufacture within the village; it was, until 2016, the only dry municipality in the state of Wisconsin. There were two referendums concerning the sale of liquor within the village, in 1934 and 1992. Both times the citizenry voted decisively to keep the village dry (with majorities of 59% and 74%, respectively). On April 5, 2016, village residents voted on two separate referendums to allow beer and/or wine sales within the village, both of which passed by 56% and 68% majorities.

== Geography ==
To the west is Peninsula State Park; to the east and south are unincorporated parts of the town of Gibraltar. Ephraim is located at 45°9′23″N 87°10′16″W (45.156509, -87.171047).

According to the United States Census Bureau, the village has a total area of 7.16 square miles (18.54 km^{2}), of which 3.79 square miles (9.82 km^{2}) is land and 3.37 square miles (8.73 km^{2}) is water.

The highest point in the village (at the north end of North Orchard Street) is approximately 788 feet (240 m) above sea level, or 210 feet (64 m) above the surface of Green Bay.

=== Climate ===
The climate in Ephraim is temperate, with warm summers and cold winters.

Peninsular Agricultural Research Station north of Sturgeon Bay

Climate chart (precipitation, max. and min. temperature)
J	F	M	A	M	J	J	A	S	O	N	D
1.8 24 8	1.1 28 11	2.1 38 21	2.7 50 32	2.9 64 43	3.5 74 53	3.4 79 59	3.6 77 57	3.4 69 50	2.7 56 39	2.5 42 28	1.8 30 16
- █ Average max. and min. temperatures in °F
- █ Precipitation totals in inches
- Source: Climate-Charts.com
Metric conversion
J	F	M	A	M	J	J	A	S	O	N	D
45 −4 −13	28 −2 −12	54 3 −6	68 10 0	74 18 6	89 23 11	87 26 15	92 25 14	87 20 10	68 13 4	64 5 −2	45 −1 −9
- █ Average max. and min. temperatures in °C
- █ Precipitation totals in mm

== Demographics ==
=== 2010 census ===
Historical population
Census	Pop.	Note	%±
1920	196		—
1930	191		−2.6%
1940	254		33.0%
1950	244		−3.9%
1960	221		−9.4%
1970	236		6.8%
1980	319		35.2%
1990	261		−18.2%
2000	353		35.2%
2010	288		−18.4%
2020	345		19.8%
U.S. Decennial Census

As of the census of 2010, there were 288 people, 138 households, and 92 families residing in the village. The population density was 76.0 inhabitants per square mile (29.3/km^{2}). There were 654 housing units at an average density of 172.6 per square mile (66.6/km^{2}). The racial makeup of the village was 99.0% White, 0.3% Native American, and 0.7% from other races. Hispanic or Latino of any race were 2.4% of the population.

There were 138 households, of which 17.4% had children under the age of 18 living with them, 56.5% were married couples living together, 7.2% had a female householder with no husband present, 2.9% had a male householder with no wife present, and 33.3% were non-families. 27.5% of all households were made up of individuals, and 15.9% had someone living alone who was 65 years of age or older. The average household size was 2.09 and the average family size was 2.52.

The median age in the village was 58.8 years. 14.9% of residents were under the age of 18; 2.5% were between the ages of 18 and 24; 16.7% were from 25 to 44; 33% were from 45 to 64; and 33% were 65 years of age or older. The gender makeup of the village was 46.9% male and 53.1% female.

=== 2000 census ===
As of the census of 2000, there were 353 people, 161 households, and 112 families residing in the village. The population density was 90.6 people per square mile (34.9/km^{2}). There were 771 housing units at an average density of 197.8 per square mile (76.3/km^{2}). The racial makeup of the village was 99.15% White, and 0.85% from two or more races. Hispanic or Latino of any race were 0.28% of the population.

There were 161 households, out of which 18.0% had children under the age of 18 living with them, 63.4% were married couples living together, 3.1% had a female householder with no husband present, and 30.4% were non-families. 27.3% of all households were made up of individuals, and 14.3% had someone living alone who was 65 years of age or older. The average household size was 2.19 and the average family size was 2.62.

In the village, the population was spread out, with 19.0% under the age of 18, 2.5% from 18 to 24, 17.6% from 25 to 44, 32.9% from 45 to 64, and 28.0% who were 65 years of age or older. The median age was 53 years. For every 100 females, there were 85.8 males. For every 100 females age 18 and over, there were 81.0 males.

The median income for a household in the village was $52,500, and the median income for a family was $60,227. Males had a median income of $37,813 versus $31,875 for females. The per capita income for the village was $30,579. About 2.7% of families and 5.2% of the population were below the poverty line, including 15.8% of those under age 18 and 3.2% of those age 65 or over.

== Events ==
The village's main festival is Fyr Bal, a Scandinavian celebration held near the solstice in mid-June to drive out the wicked winter witch. Each year a person is assigned the role of Chieftain. At sunset, this Chieftain travels across Eagle Harbor via a pontoon boat and once they land in Ephraim, lights a large bonfire. Bonfires burn along the shoreline as residents and visitors gather to celebrate the beginning of summer.

== Education ==
Gibraltar Area Schools serves the community. Gibraltar Elementary School and Gibraltar Secondary School are the two schools.

== Notable people ==
- Bert D. Thorp, Wisconsin State Assembly and businessman, lived in Ephraim; he served as president of the village of Ephraim.

== Images ==
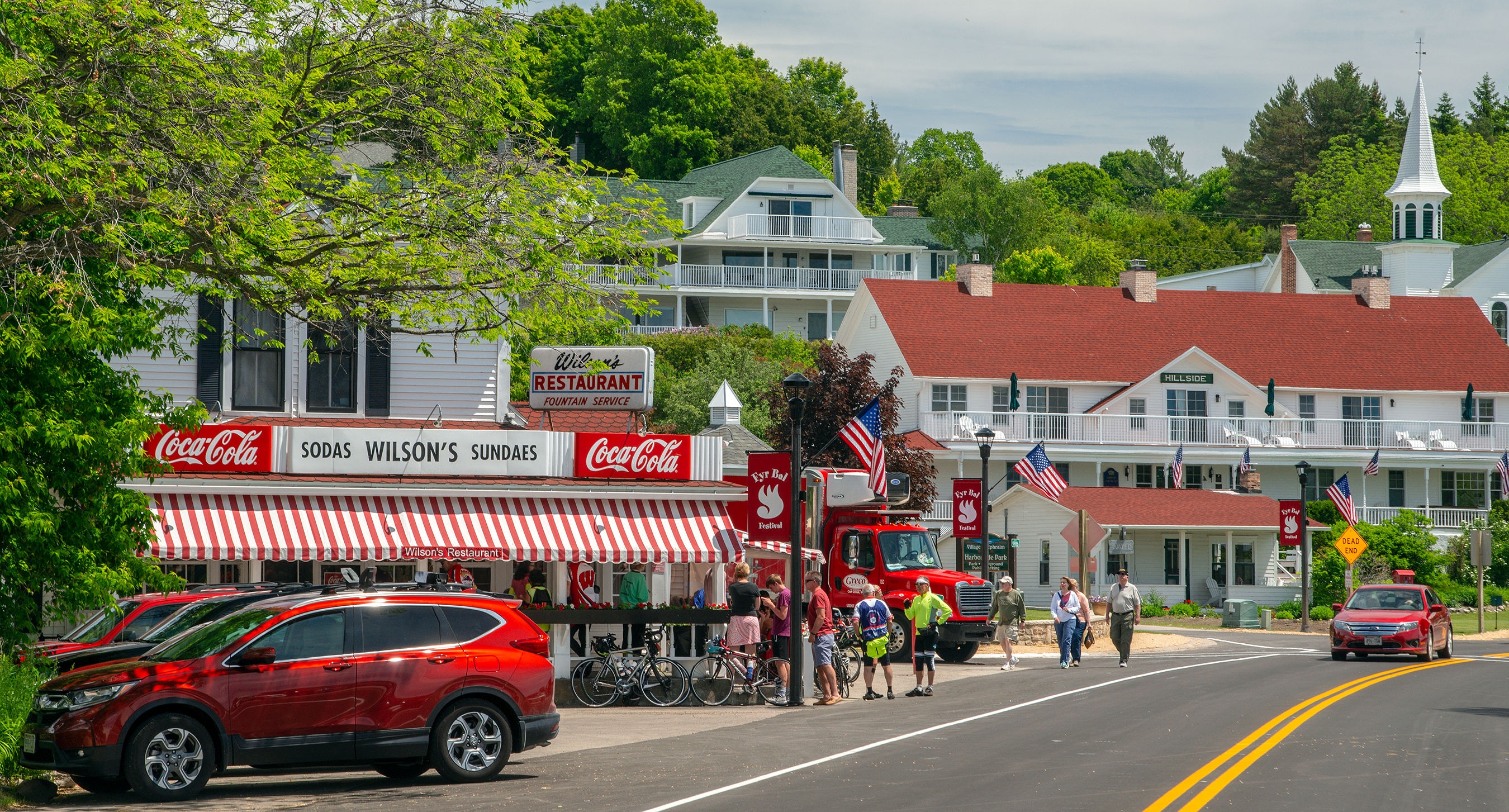
Architecture along Water Street

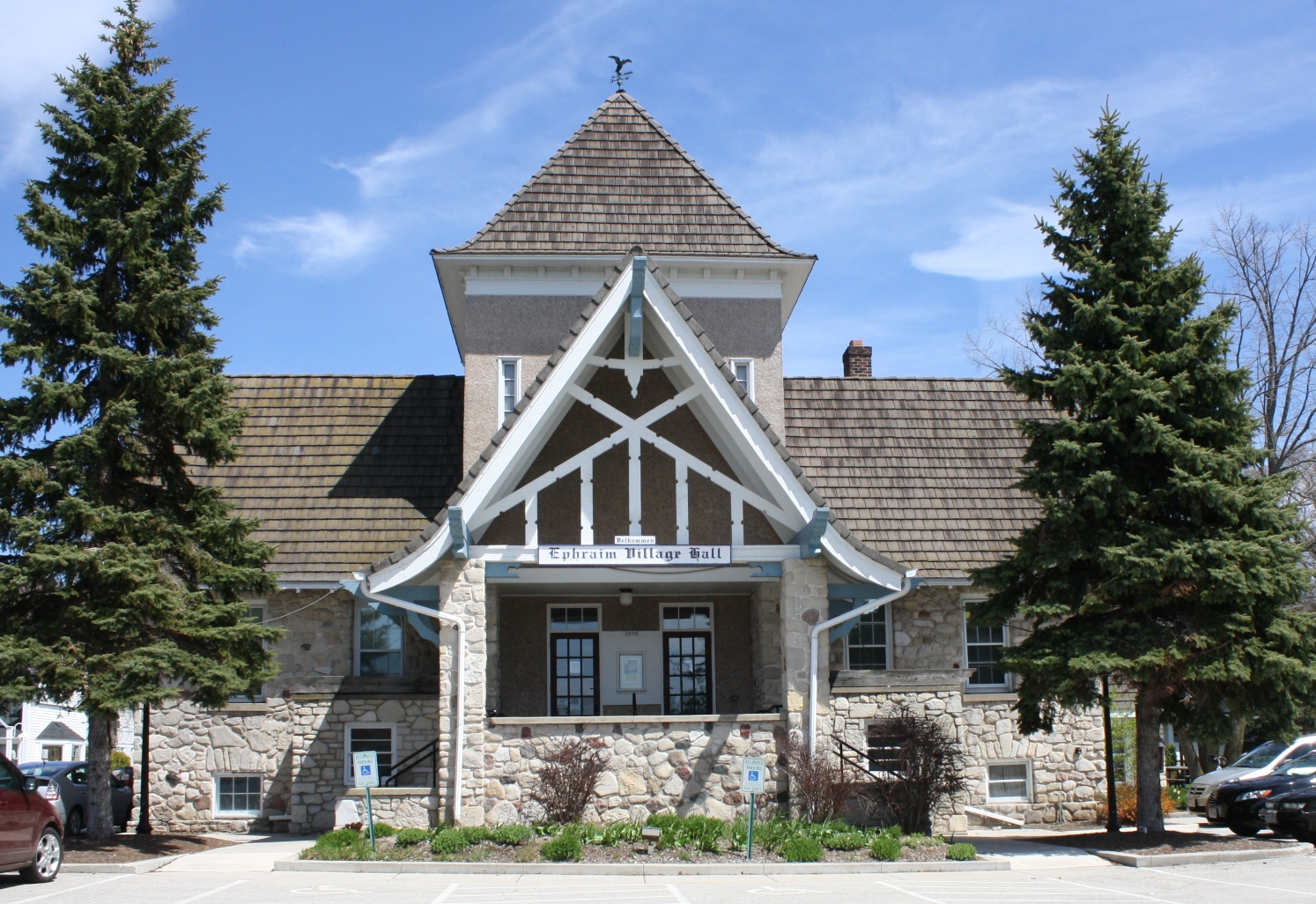
Ephraim Village Hall

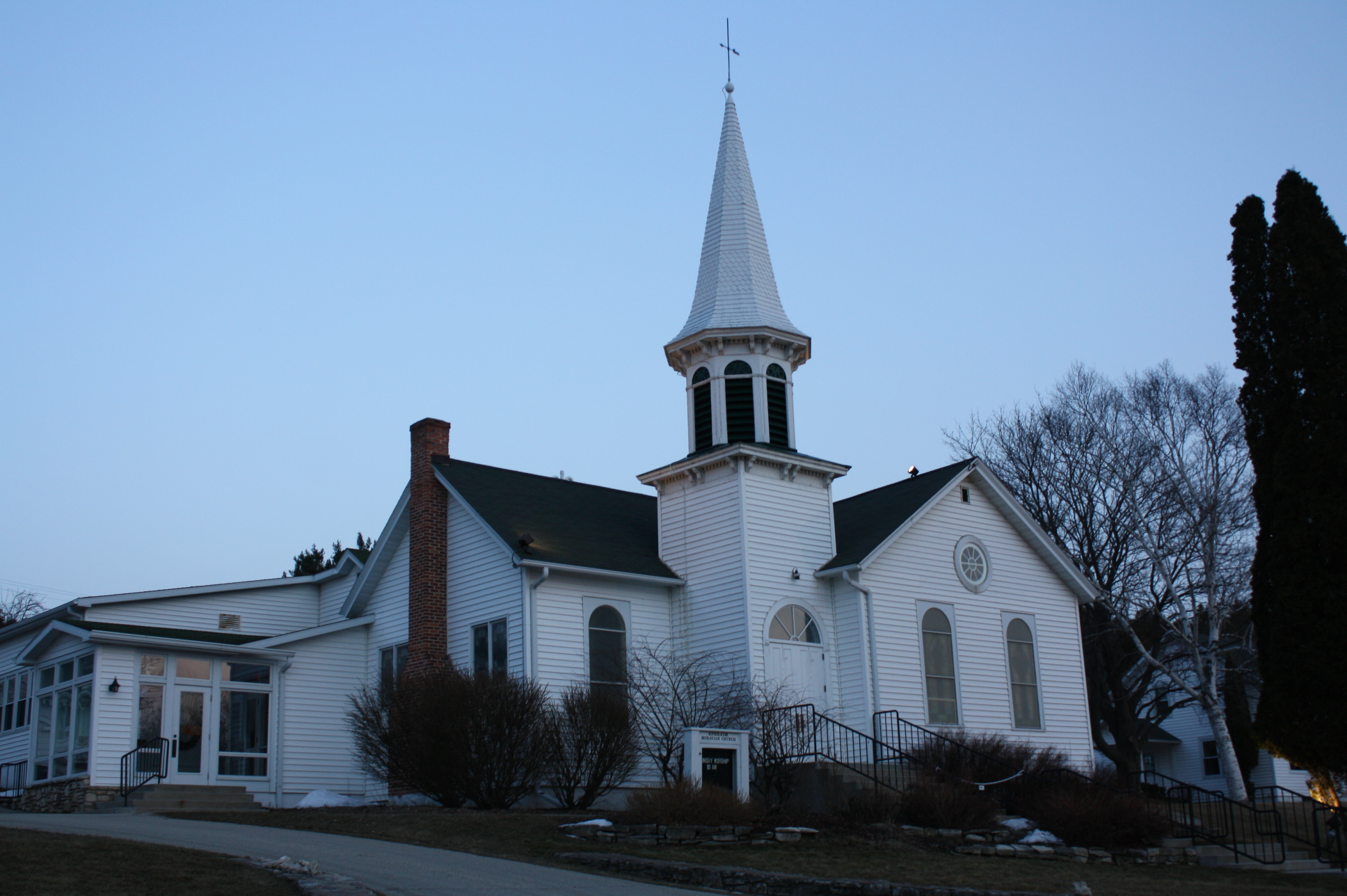
Ephraim Moravian Church

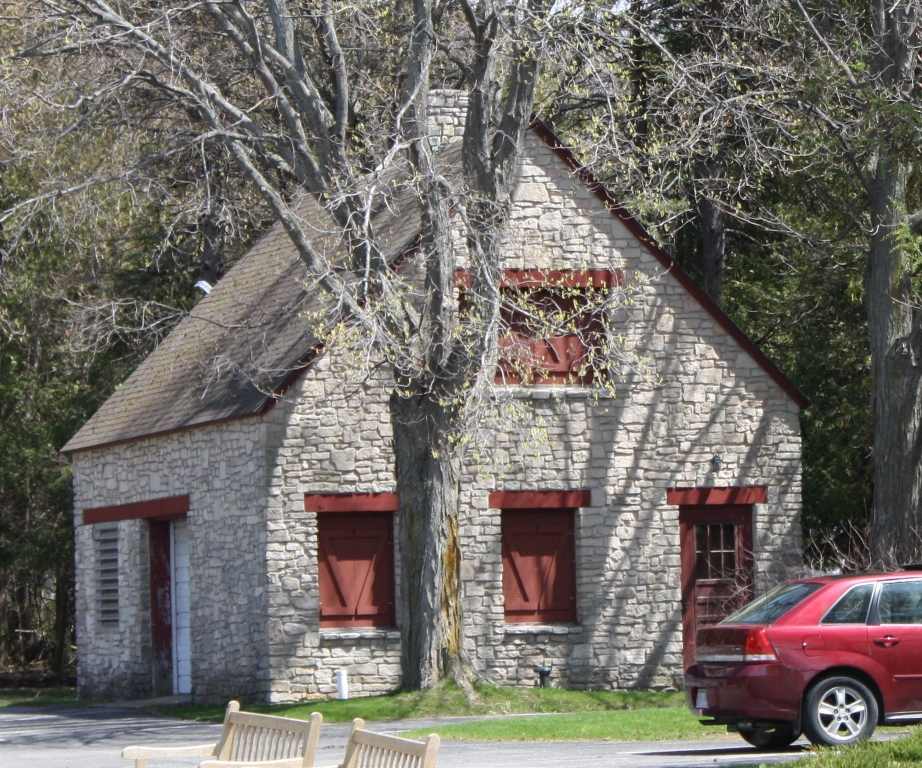
Peter Peterson House

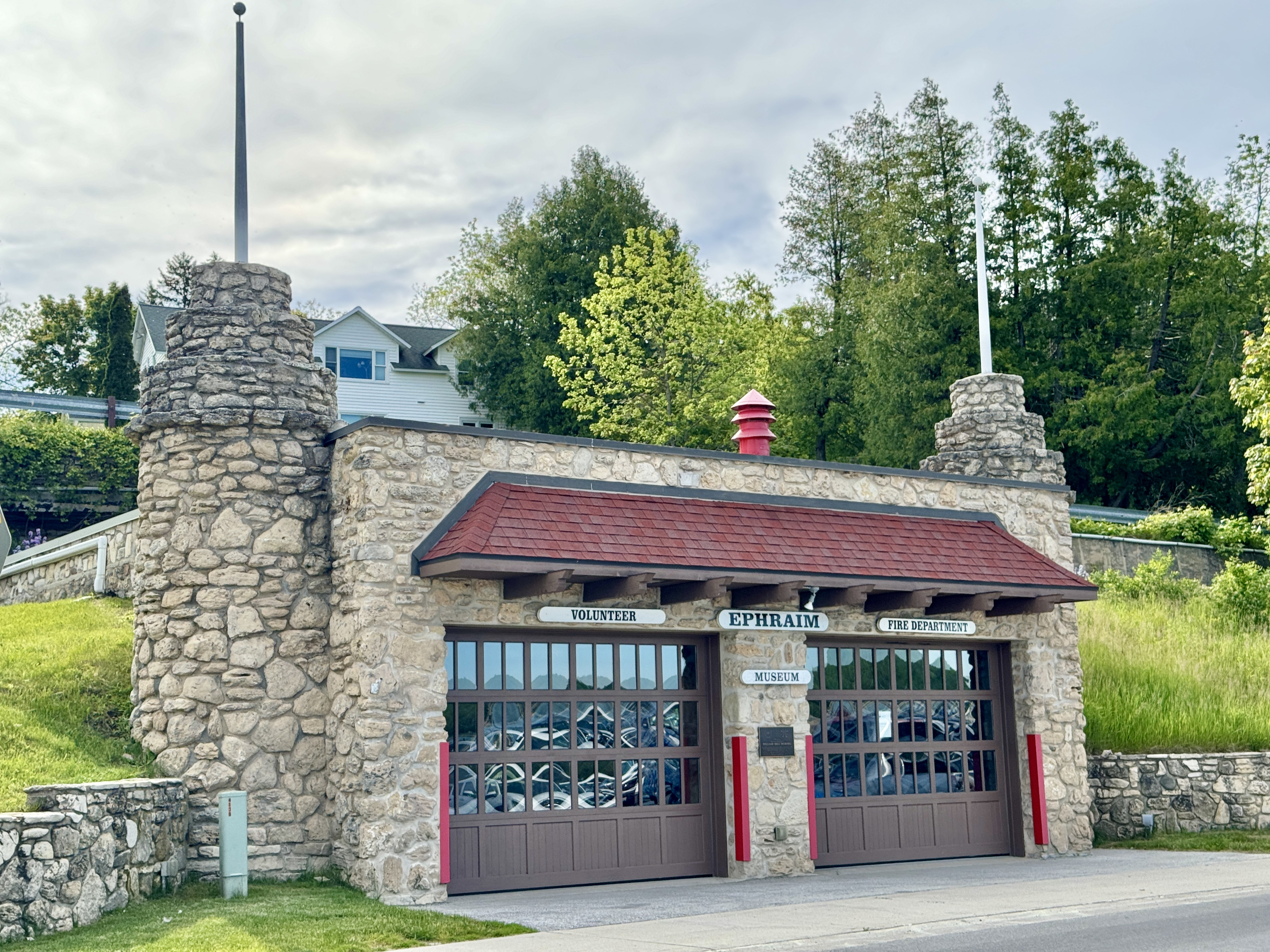
Former fire station

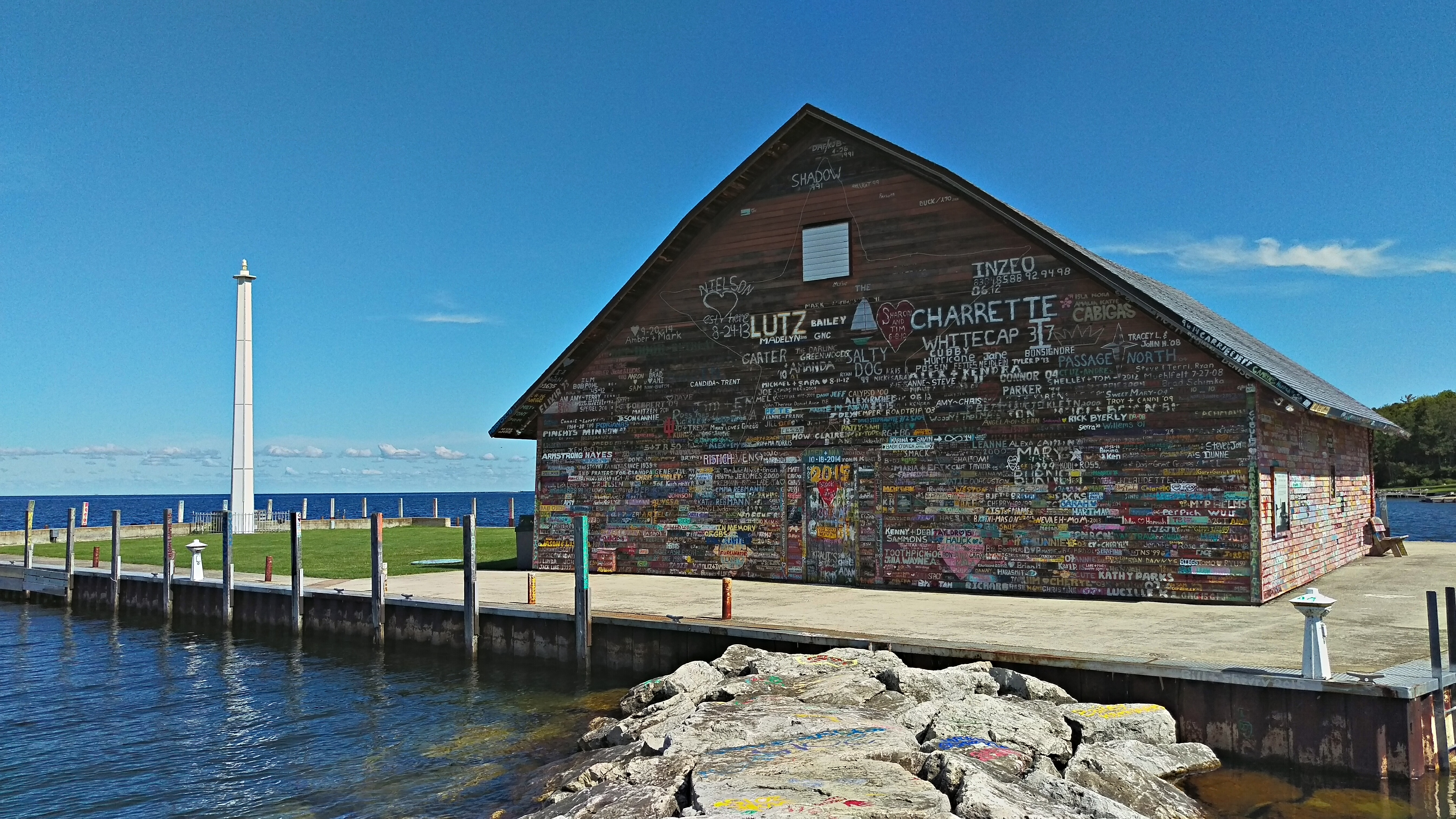
Anderson Dock; graffiti is permitted on the warehouse building within certain limits.

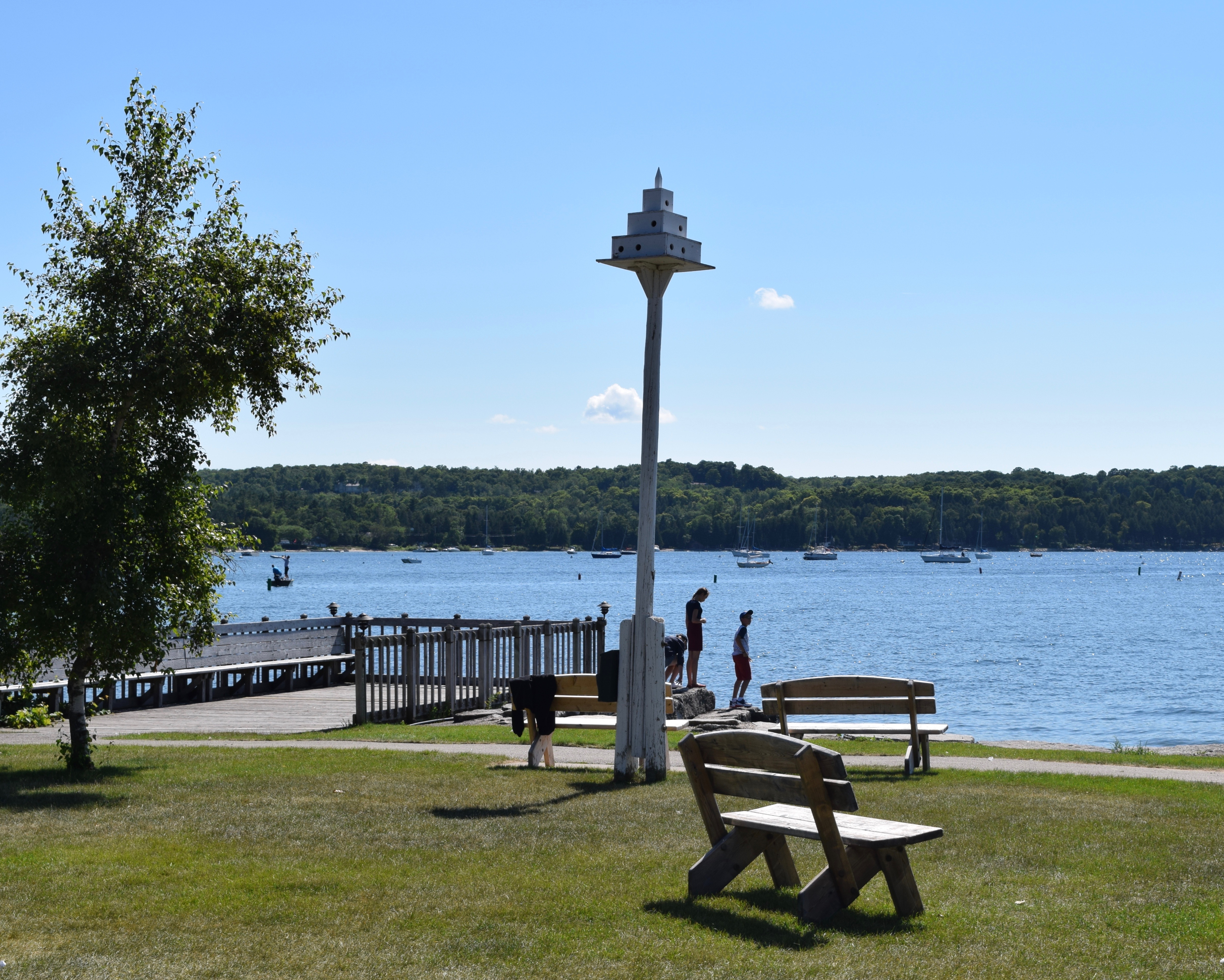
Harborside Park

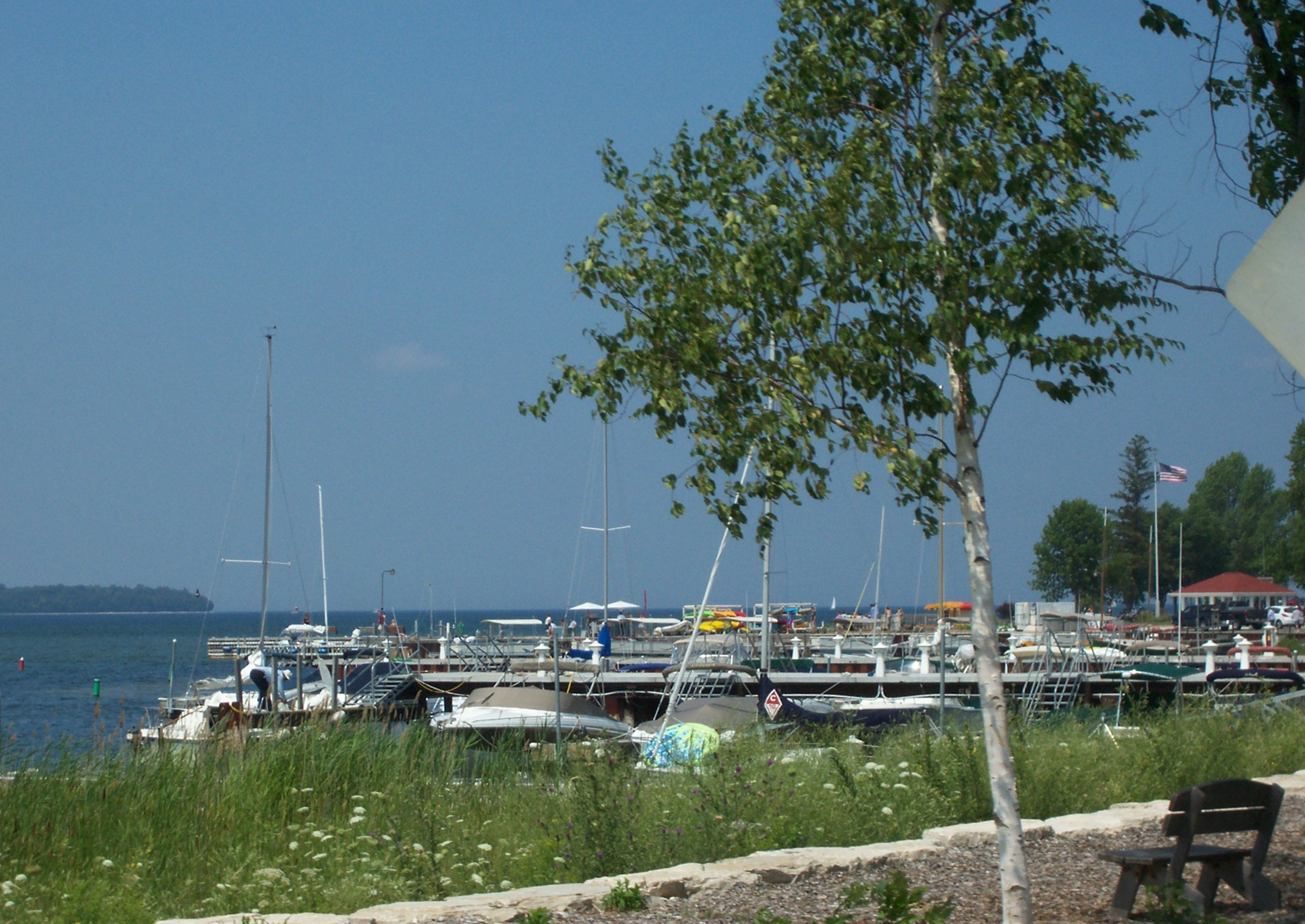
View of marina from Highway 42

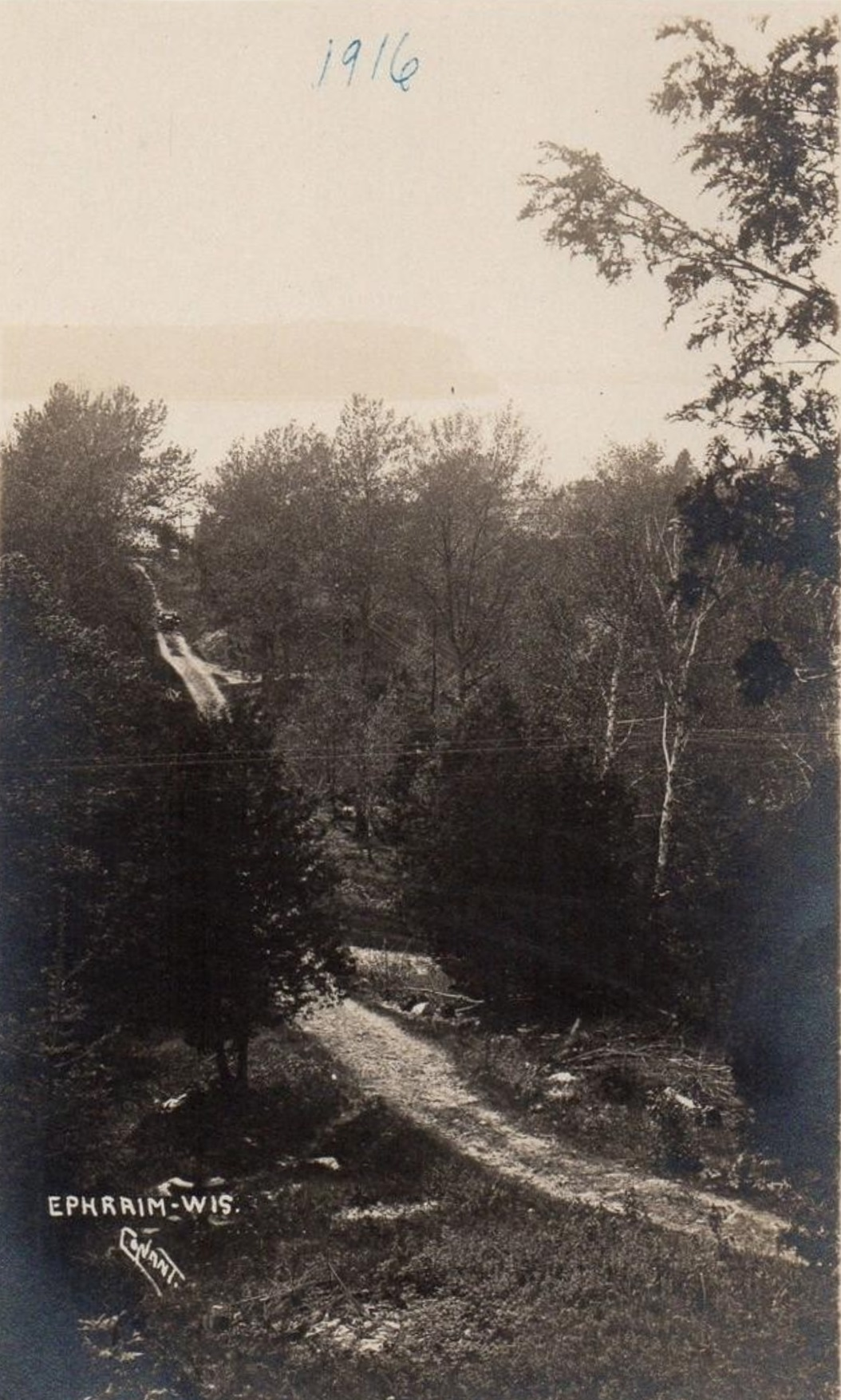
Car near the top of a dirt road near Ephraim; from a postcard postmarked in 1916
