= Robert Naumann =

American politician

Robert Naumann (July 31, 1862 – August 20, 1926) was an American farmer, businessman, and politician.

Born in Newton, Manitowoc County, Wisconsin, Naumann was a farmer. In 1895, he purchased a cheese factory of which he operated until 1916. Then, Naumann was involved in the taxi business. From 1923 until his death in 1925, Naumann served in the Wisconsin State Assembly and was a Republican. Naumann died in the Holy Family Hospital in Manitowoc, Wisconsin, where he had lived, following an operation.
