= Prairie Farm, Wisconsin =

- Village
- Location of Prairie Farm in Barron County, Wisconsin
- Coordinates: 45°15′7″N 91°58′39″W
- Country: United States
- State: Wisconsin
- County: Barron

Area
  - Total: 1.00 sq mi (2.58 km^{2})
  - Land: 0.96 sq mi (2.49 km^{2})
  - Water: 0.035 sq mi (0.09 km^{2})
- Elevation: 1,043 ft (318 m)

Population (2020)
  - Total: 494
  - Density: 514/sq mi (198/km^{2})
- Time zone: UTC-6 (Central (CST))
  - Summer (DST): UTC-5 (CDT)
- Area codes: 715 & 534
- FIPS code: 55-65150
- GNIS feature ID: 1571876

Prairie Farm is a village in Barron County in the U.S. state of Wisconsin. The population was 494 at the 2020 census. The village is located within the Town of Prairie Farm, on eastern shore of the Prairie Farm Flowage, a reservoir on the Hay River.

== Geography ==
Prairie Farm is located at 45°14′18″N 91°58′50″W (45.238443, -91.980591).

According to the United States Census Bureau, the village has a total area of 1.01 square miles (2.62 km^{2}), of which 0.97 square miles (2.51 km^{2}) is land and 0.04 square miles (0.10 km^{2}) is water.

Prairie Farm is located along County Roads A and F.

== Demographics ==
Historical population
Census	Pop.	Note	%±
1880	80		—
1910	368		—
1920	299		−18.7%
1930	301		0.7%
1940	335		11.3%
1950	343		2.4%
1960	350		2.0%
1970	426		21.7%
1980	387		−9.2%
1990	494		27.6%
2000	508		2.8%
2010	473		−6.9%
2020	494		4.4%
U.S. Decennial Census

=== 2010 census ===
As of the census of 2010, there were 473 people, 201 households, and 114 families living in the village. The population density was 487.6 inhabitants per square mile (188.3/km^{2}). There were 227 housing units at an average density of 234.0 per square mile (90.3/km^{2}). The racial makeup of the village was 98.5% White, 0.2% Native American, 0.8% from other races, and 0.4% from two or more races. Hispanic or Latino people of any race were 2.1% of the population.

There were 201 households, of which 26.9% had children under the age of 18 living with them, 43.3% were married couples living together, 8.5% had a female householder with no husband present, 5.0% had a male householder with no wife present, and 43.3% were non-families. 36.3% of all households were made up of individuals, and 16.9% had someone living alone who was 65 years of age or older. The average household size was 2.16 and the average family size was 2.83.

The median age in the village was 44.9 years. 21.1% of residents were under the age of 18; 5.2% were between the ages of 18 and 24; 24.1% were from 25 to 44; 26.2% were from 45 to 64; and 23.5% were 65 years of age or older. The gender makeup of the village was 45.9% male and 54.1% female.

=== 2000 census ===
As of the census of 2000, there were 508 people, 199 households, and 119 families living in the village. The population density was 524.1 people per square mile (202.2/km^{2}). There were 208 housing units at an average density of 214.6 per square mile (82.8/km^{2}). The racial makeup of the village was 99.41% White, 0.39% Native American, and 0.20% from two or more races. Hispanic or Latino people of any race were 3.15% of the population.

There were 199 households, out of which 27.6% had children under the age of 18 living with them, 50.3% were married couples living together, 5.5% had a female householder with no husband present, and 39.7% were non-families. 31.7% of all households were made up of individuals, and 17.6% had someone living alone who was 65 years of age or older. The average household size was 2.36 and the average family size was 3.03.

In the village, the population was spread out, with 22.2% under the age of 18, 6.9% from 18 to 24, 24.2% from 25 to 44, 23.4% from 45 to 64, and 23.2% who were 65 years of age or older. The median age was 42 years. For every 100 females, there were 92.4 males. For every 100 females age 18 and over, there were 89.9 males.

The median income for a household in the village was $38,000, and the median income for a family was $41,667. Males had a median income of $27,206 versus $21,917 for females. The per capita income for the village was $15,638. About 5.8% of families and 7.8% of the population were below the poverty line, including 3.6% of those under age 18 and 15.9% of those age 65 or over.
