= Helen F. Thompson =

American politician

Helen F. Thompson was an American businesswoman and politician.

Born in the town of Menasha in Winnebago County, Wisconsin, Thompson owned a hotel in Park Falls, Wisconsin and was also a teacher. She was also the President of the Red Cross chapter in Price County, Wisconsin. Thompson served on the Park Falls School Board. Then, she served on the Wisconsin State Assembly in 1925 and 1927 and was a Republican.
