= Howard Teasdale =

American politician

Howard Teasdale (August 9, 1855 – January 14, 1936) was a member of the Wisconsin State Senate.

== Biography ==
Teasdale was born on August 9, 1855, in Janesville, Wisconsin. He attended the University of Wisconsin-Madison and the University of Wisconsin Law School. Teasdale died on January 14, 1936, in San Antonio, Texas.

== Career ==
Teasdale graduated from University of Wisconsin Law School in 1881, and he was a member of the Senate from 1911 to 1931. Previously, he had been District Attorney of Monroe County, Wisconsin, from 1901 to 1905, Clerk of Sparta, Wisconsin, from 1891 to 1896 and a justice of the peace from 1891 to 1892. He was a Republican. Teasdale's Commission interrogated suspected prostitutes and Johns in Wisconsin. The commission is notable insofar as being an investigation of what was termed "vice". The Wisconsin Blue Book listed Teasdale in 1913 as "discouraging the evils of liquor traffic" and also opposing the teachers' pension law. Subsequent editions of the Wisconsin Blue Book have cited Teasdale's support for "progressive legislation," including regulation of rail lines and alerts being placed at all rail crossings in Wisconsin.
