= Frank Roemhild =

American politician (1866–1925)

Frank Roemhild (September 16, 1866 – April 15, 1925) was an American politician and farmer.

Born in Dane County, Wisconsin, Roemhild taught school and then farmed in the Town of Prairie Farm, Barron County, Wisconsin. He also was involved with the insurance business and the telephone company. Roemhild served as the Town of Prairie Farm Chairman, treasurer, and assessor. In 1924, Roemhild was elected to the Wisconsin State Assembly as a Republican, but illness prevented him from formally taking office. He died in 1925 while still in office.
