= Ernst Pahl =

American politician

Ernst Pahl (born September 21, 1860, in Germany) was a German-born American politician. He was a member of the Wisconsin State Assembly. He later moved to Milwaukee, Wisconsin.

== Career ==
Pahl was elected to the Assembly in 1924. He was a Republican.
