= Hugo Jeske =

American politician

Hugo Jeske was a member of the Wisconsin State Assembly.

== Biography ==
Jeske was born on August 3, 1873, in Milwaukee, Wisconsin. He attended Lutheran parochial schools and Concordia Theological College. (Note: Presumably this Concordia theological college was in Milwaukee because he apparently lived his entire life there. The sources do not specify which of the several Concordia colleges he attended.) Jeske died on March 3, 1920.

== Career ==
Jeske was elected to the Assembly in 1916. He was a Republican.
