= Milwaukee Motion Picture Commission =

Former film censor board of Milwaukee, Wisconsin

The Milwaukee Motion Picture Commission (MMPC) was the official film censor board of the city of Milwaukee, Wisconsin. The Board operated from 1914 to 1970 and kept dozens of films from playing in the city and struck hundreds of "objectionable" scenes from other films. It was unique among the large roster of city and state film censor boards in that it was never endowed with any legal powers, but enforced its rulings through the threat of theatre license revocation.

The Commission was founded in 1914 after several reform measures undertaken by the city government aimed at cleaning up the rapidly growing motion picture business in Milwaukee. Originally known as the Citizen's Commission on Motion Pictures, the board was tasked with reviewing all films booked to play in the city, asking for scenes to be removed or requesting that films not be played in Milwaukee. The board had no official mechanism of enforcement, but with the vow of the city's mayor to shutter any city theatre found to be in violation of commission rulings, the board managed to enforce its will into the early sound era.

With the major Hollywood studios now dominating both film production and exhibition by the 1930s, as well as the strict enforcement of the Hays Code, the commission found itself with little to do. Mayor Daniel Hoan had little interest in backing the board during this time, and it largely fell into irrelevance. The election of Carl Zeidler in 1940 offered a brief restoration of the board's power, as he vigorously backed their efforts at targeting crime pictures, but with the US's entrance into World War II – as well as Mayor Zeidler's resignation to join the fight – the board again found itself on the outskirts of power.

When Carl Zeidler's younger brother Frank P. Zeidler was elected Milwaukee's mayor in 1948, he took a keen interest in the aims of the commission. Zeidler's steady backing reinvigorated the board, and helped them in their crusades against art films like The Moon Is Blue (1953), Blackboard Jungle (1955), and Rebel Without a Cause (1955). In the late 1950s, the commission took on the new art film trend, banning several films booked into the city's Northside Coronet Theatre, once even nearly having the theatre's manager arrested for booking the French film The Snow Was Black (1957).

From 1960 on, the commission's main focus was sex. Their single-minded efforts to prevent racy material from Milwaukee's movie screens kept nearly all instances of nudity and sexual expression from the city for nearly a decade after it appeared elsewhere. It was not until theatre owners, emboldened by a series of national court rulings that had rolled back what would be legally banned from the movies, began flagrantly disregarding commission rulings in 1969 that the first wave of films showing nudity and strong sexual contact hit Milwaukee. Mayor Henry Maier was unwilling to threaten license revocation during this theatre rebellion, so the commission pushed through a bill granting them legal authority to enforce their rulings in late 1970. The bill was challenged by theatre owners before it could take effect, and in the summer of 1971, a federal court ruling tossed the law and rendered the commission effectively dead.

MMPC Executive Secretaries

- Guy Radley (1921)
- George Hampel (1921-1936)
- Frank Metcalfe (1937-1944)
- Frank Tupper (1944)
- Lester Bradshaw (1945-1946)
- Herbert Drissen (1946-1952)
- Valentine Wells (1952-1971)

Notable Films Ruled Not Suitable for Exhibition in Milwaukee

- His Night Out (1915)
- The Birth of a Nation (1915)
- Is Any Girl Safe (1916)
- Primrose Path (1930)
- The Public Enemy (1931)
- Freaks (1932)
- Road To Ruin (1934)
- The Outlaw (1943)
- Scarlet Street (1945)
- Mom and Dad (1945)
- The Moon is Blue (1953)
- Garden of Eden (1954)
- Blackboard Jungle (1955)
- Rebel Without a Cause (1955)
- Diabolique (1955)
- The Immoral Mr. Teas (1959)
- Mr. Peters’ Pets (1963)
- Lorna (1964)
- Vixen! (1968)
- I, A Woman, Part II (1969)
