= 55th Wisconsin Legislature =

Wisconsin legislative term for 1921–1922

←	54th	56th	→
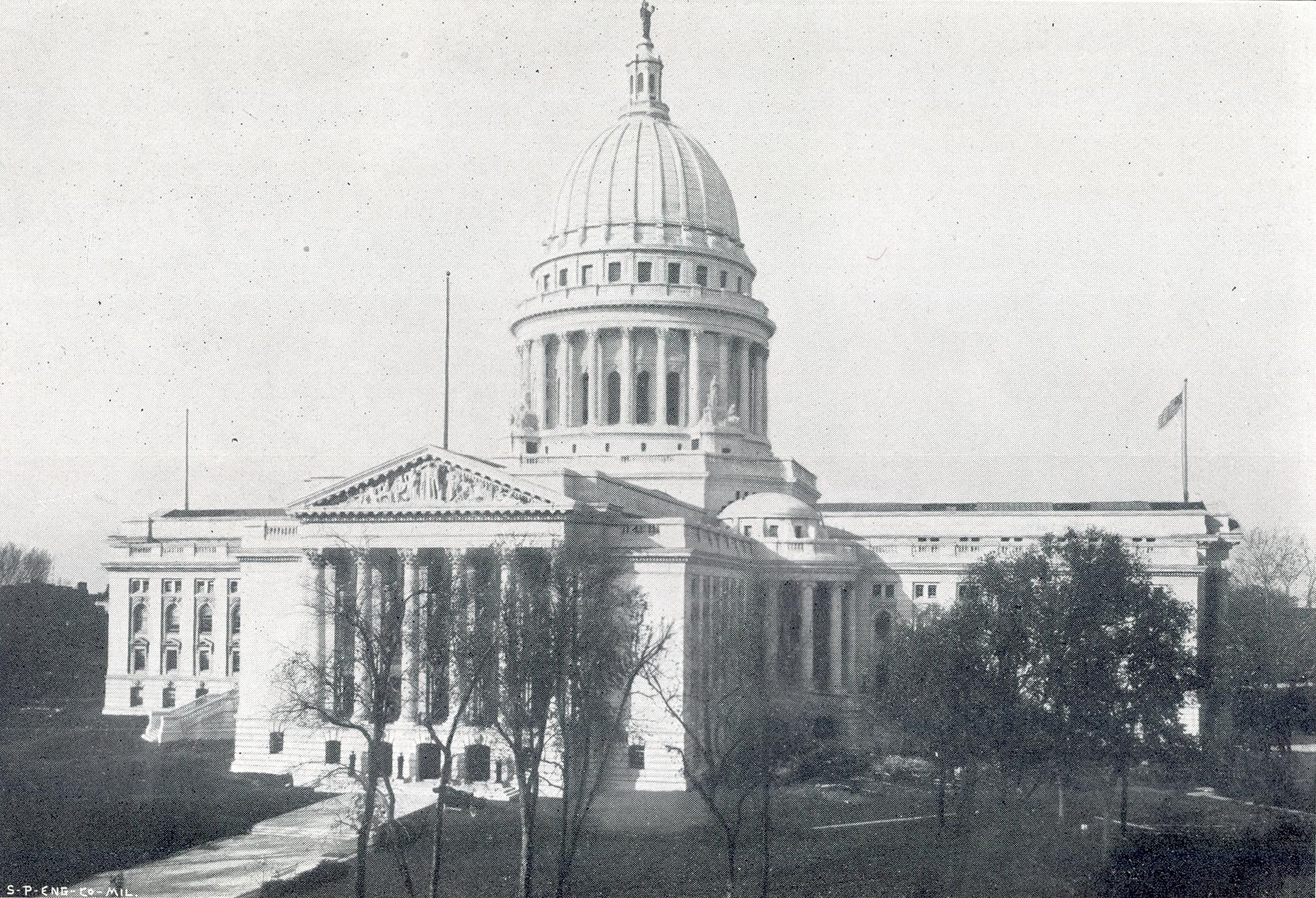
- Wisconsin State Capitol ca.1915

Overview
- Legislative body: Wisconsin Legislature
- Meeting place: Wisconsin State Capitol
- Term: January 3, 1921 – January 1, 1923
- Election: November 2, 1920

Senate
- Members: 33
- Senate President: George Comings (R)
- President pro tempore: Timothy Burke (R)
- Party control: Republican

Assembly
- Members: 100
- Assembly Speaker: Riley S. Young (R)
- Party control: Republican

Sessions
- Regular: January 12, 1921 – July 14, 1921

Special sessions
- Mar. 1921 Spec.: March 22, 1922 – March 28, 1922

The Fifty-Fifth Wisconsin Legislature convened from January 12, 1921, to July 14, 1921, in regular session, and re-convened in a special session in March 1922.

Senators representing even-numbered districts were newly elected for this session and were serving the first two years of a four-year term. Assembly members were elected to a two-year term. Assembly members and even-numbered senators were elected in the general election of November 3, 1920. Senators representing odd-numbered districts were serving the third and fourth year of a four-year term, having been elected in the general election of November 5, 1918.

The governor of Wisconsin during this entire term was Republican John J. Blaine, of Grant County, serving a two-year term, having won election in the 1920 Wisconsin gubernatorial election.

== Major events ==
- January 3, 1921: Inauguration of John J. Blaine as the 24th Governor of Wisconsin.
- January 29, 1921: Wisconsin Supreme Court justice James C. Kerwin died in office.
- March 4, 1921: Inauguration of Warren G. Harding as the 29th President of the United States.
- March 11, 1921: Christian Doerfler was appointed a justice of the Wisconsin Supreme Court by Governor John J. Blaine, to fill the vacancy caused by the death of justice James C. Kerwin.
- May 19, 1921: U.S. President Warren G. Harding signed the Emergency Quota Act into law, limiting the immigration of southern and eastern Europeans to the United States.
- December 6, 1921: The Anglo-Irish Treaty formally ends the Irish War of Independence, establishing the Irish Free State.
- February 6, 1922: The Five Power Naval Disarmament Treaty was signed between the United States, United Kingdom, Japan, France, and Italy. The treaty placed limits on construction of battleships and placed weight limitations on other naval ships.
- February 12, 1922: Wisconsin chief justice Robert G. Siebecker died in office. Justice Aad J. Vinje immediately succeeded to the position of chief justice due to the rule of seniority.
- April 3, 1922: Joseph Stalin was appointed General Secretary of the Central Committee of the Soviet Communist Party.
- April 4, 1922: Attorney Charles H. Crownhart was appointed a justice of the Wisconsin Supreme Court by Governor John J. Blaine, to fill the vacancy caused by the death of chief justice Robert G. Siebecker.
- May 15, 1922: The WCAY radio station began broadcasting in Milwaukee, Wisconsin.
- May 30, 1922: Dedication of the Lincoln Memorial in Washington, D.C.
- June 14, 1922: U.S. President Warren G. Harding made the first presidential speech over radio.
- October 31, 1922: Benito Mussolini became Prime Minister of Italy after leading a coup d'état with his National Fascist Party.
- November 7, 1922: 1922 United States general election:
  - John J. Blaine re-elected Governor of Wisconsin.
  - Robert M. La Follette re-elected United States senator from Wisconsin.
  - Wisconsin voters approved an amendment to the state constitution changing jury rules for civil trials, so that a verdict requires at least five-sixths majority.
  - Wisconsin voters rejected two other amendments to the state constitution:
    - to remove term limits from sheriffs
    - to allow municipalities to take on additional debt to pay for streetcars or power, water, or heat infrastructure
- November 11, 1922: The Lausanne Conference recognized the Republic of Turkey as having replaced the Ottoman sultanate as the legitimate government of Turkey.
- December 30, 1922: The Union of Soviet Socialist Republics was created by the union of Russia, Ukraine, Belarus, and the Transcaucasian Republic.

== Major legislation ==
- July 9, 1921: An Act ... relating to the re-apportionment of the state into assembly and senatorial districts, 1921 Act 470.
- Joint Resolution to amend section 5, article I of the constitution, relating to trial by jury, 1921 Joint Resolution 17. Second legislative passage of a proposed amendment to the state constitution to change jury rules for civil trials, so that a verdict requires a minimum of five-sixths of the jury. This amendment was ratified by voters in the November 1922 election.
- Joint Resolution to amend section 7 of article VII of the constitution, relating to circuit judges, 1921 Joint Resolution 24. First legislative passage of a proposed amendment to the state constitution to expand the number of circuits eligible for having multiple judges.
- Joint Resolution to amend section 21 of article IV of the constitution, relating to compensation or members of the legislature, 1921 Joint Resolution 28. First legislative passage of a proposed amendment to the state constitution to raise legislative pay to $750 per year ($12,000 adjusted for inflation to 2023). Voters had just defeated another amendment which would have given the Legislature control of their own salary in 1920. This amendment would also ultimately be defeated in April 1924.
- Joint Resolution to amend section 10 of article VIII of the constitution, relating to internal improvements, 1921 Joint Resolution 29. First legislative passage of a proposed amendment to the state constitution to allow state spending on forestry improvements.
- Joint Resolution to amend section 4 of article VI of the constitution, relating to county officers, 1921 Joint Resolution 36. Second legislative passage of a proposed amendment to the state constitution to remove term limits for sheriffs. This amendment was defeated by voters in the November 1922 election.
- Joint Resolution to create section 3b of article XI of the constitution, relating to the indebtedness of municipal corporations, 1921 Joint Resolution 37. Second legislative passage of a proposed amendment to the state constitution to allow municipalities to take on additional debt for street rail or other utilities. This amendment was defeated by voters in the November 1922 election.
- Joint Resolution to amend section 3 of article XI of the constitution, relating to powers of cities and villages, 1921 Joint Resolution 39. First legislative passage of a proposed amendment to the state constitution to grant home rule to all cities and villages in the state.

== Party summary ==
=== Senate summary ===
Senate partisan composition Democratic: 2 seats Socialist: 4 seats Republican: 27 seats

	Party (Shading indicates majority caucus)			Total	
	Dem.	Soc.	Rep.	Total	Vacant
End of previous Legislature	2	4	27	32	1
Start of 1st Session	2	4	27	33	0
Final voting share	18.18%		81.82%		
Beginning of the next Legislature	0	3	29	32	1

=== Assembly summary ===
Assembly partisan composition Democratic: 2 seats Socialist: 6 seats Republican: 92 seats

	Party (Shading indicates majority caucus)			Total	
	Dem.	Soc.	Rep.	Total	Vacant
End of previous Legislature	6	16	76	98	2
Start of 1st Session	2	6	92	100	0
From Jan. 15, 1921 (Note: Republican Samuel Owens (Green Lake County) died.)	2	6	91	99	1
From Mar. 8, 1921 (Note: Republican Ira W. Parker (Green Lake County) was sworn in to replace Samuel Owens.)	2	6	92	100	0
Final voting share	8%		92%		
Beginning of the next Legislature	1	10	89	100	0

== Sessions ==
- Regular session: January 12, 1921 – July 14, 1921
- March 1922 special session: March 22, 1922 – March 28, 1922

== Leaders ==
=== Senate leadership ===
- President of the Senate: George Comings (R)
- President pro tempore: Timothy Burke (R–Green Bay)

=== Assembly leadership ===
- Speaker of the Assembly: Riley S. Young (R–Darien)

== Members ==
=== Members of the Senate ===
Members of the Senate for the Fifty-Fifth Wisconsin Legislature:

Dist.	Counties	Senator	Residence	Party
01	Door, Kewaunee, & Marinette	Herbert Peterson	Sturgeon Bay	Rep.
02	Brown & Oconto	Timothy Burke	Green Bay	Rep.
03	Kenosha & Racine	George L. Buck	Racine	Rep.
04	Milwaukee (Northern Part)	Oscar Morris	Milwaukee	Rep.
05	Milwaukee (Middle-West County & Central-Western City)	Rudolph Beyer	Milwaukee	Soc.
06	Milwaukee (Northern City)	Joseph J. Hirsch	Milwaukee	Soc.
07	Milwaukee (Southern County)	Louis A. Arnold	Milwaukee	Soc.
08	Milwaukee (City South)	George Czerwinski	Milwaukee	Rep.
09	Milwaukee (City Downtown)	David V. Jennings	Milwaukee	Dem.
10	Buffalo, Pepin, Pierce, & St. Croix	George B. Skogmo	River Falls	Rep.
11	Burnett, Douglas, & Washburn	Ray J. Nye	Superior	Rep.
12	Ashland, Bayfield, Price, Rusk, & Sawyer	Chester H. Werden	Ashland	Rep.
13	Dodge & Washington	Herman J. F. Bilgrien	Iron Ridge	Rep.
14	Outagamie & Shawano	Antone Kuckuk	Shawano	Rep.
15	Calumet & Manitowoc	Henry Kleist	Rantoul	Soc.
16	Crawford, Grant, & Richland	Henry E. Roethe	Fennimore	Rep.
17	Green, Iowa, & Lafayette	Oscar R. Olson	Blanchardville	Rep.
18	Fond du Lac & Green Lake	William A. Titus	Fond du Lac	Rep.
19	Winnebago	Julius H. Dennhardt	Neenah	Rep.
20	Ozaukee & Sheboygan	Theodore Benfey	Sheboygan	Rep.
21	Adams, Juneau, Marquette, & Waushara	John A. Conant	Westfield	Rep.
22	Rock & Walworth	Eldo T. Ridgway	Elkhorn	Rep.
23	Portage & Waupaca	Herman J. Severson	Iola	Rep.
24	Clark & Wood	William L. Smith	Neillsville	Rep.
25	Langlade & Marathon	Claire B. Bird	Wausau	Rep.
26	Dane	Henry Huber	Stoughton	Rep.
27	Columbia & Sauk	George Staudenmayer	Caledonia	Rep.
28	Chippewa, & Eau Claire	Herman Lange	Eau Claire	Rep.
29	Barron, Dunn, & Polk	Algodt C. Anderson	Menomonie	Rep.
30	Florence, Forest, Iron, Lincoln, Oneida, Taylor, & Vilas	Bernard N. Moran	Rhinelander	Rep.
31	Jackson, Monroe, & Vernon	J. Henry Bennett	Viroqua	Rep.
32	La Crosse & Trempealeau	Eugene F. Clark	Galesville	Rep.
33	Jefferson & Waukesha	Charles Mulberger	Watertown	Dem.

=== Members of the Assembly ===
Members of the Assembly for the Fifty-Fifth Wisconsin Legislature:

Senate Dist.	County	Dist.	Representative	Party	Residence
21	Adams & Marquette		James F. McDowell	Rep.	Montello
12	Ashland		Abe L. Biglow	Rep.	Ashland
29	Barron		John L. Dahl	Rep.	Rice Lake
12	Bayfield		Frank W. Downs	Rep.	Washburn
02	Brown	1	James T. Oliver	Rep.	Green Bay
02	Brown	2	Gustav J. Zittlow	Rep.	Lawrence
10	Buffalo & Pepin		Elmer A. Kenyon	Rep.	Gilmanton
11	Burnett & Washburn		Erick H. Johnson	Rep.	
15	Calumet		George J. Schwalbach	Dem.	Harrison
28	Chippewa		Thomas W. Bartingale	Rep.	
24	Clark		John Verkuilen	Rep.	
27	Columbia		Robert Caldwell	Rep.	Lodi
16	Crawford		Albert C. Johnson	Rep.	Soldiers Grove
26	Dane	1	Herman W. Sachtjen	Rep.	Madison
26	Dane	2	James C. Hanson	Rep.	Christiana
26	Dane	3	Carl M. Grimstad	Rep.	Mount Horeb
13	Dodge	1	Herman A. Ziemer	Rep.	Emmet
13	Dodge	2	Fred E. Moul	Rep.	Burnett
01	Door		John Peltier	Rep.	
11	Douglas	1	James B. French	Rep.	Superior
11	Douglas	2	Charles Cole	Rep.	Parkland
29	Dunn		Alonzo L. Best	Rep.	Tiffany
28	Eau Claire		Rush Bullis	Rep.	Washington
30	Florence, Forest, & Oneida		Joseph D. Grandine	Rep.	Argonne
18	Fond du Lac	1	Joseph Lamb	Rep.	Friendship
18	Fond du Lac	2	John E. Johnson	Rep.	Brandon
16	Grant	1	Conrad J. Weittenhiller	Rep.	Platteville
16	Grant	2	Charles E. Tuffley	Rep.	Boscobel
17	Green		William Olson	Rep.	Jordan
18	Green Lake		Samuel Owens (died Jan. 15, 1921)	Rep.	Green Lake
18	Green Lake		Ira W. Parker (from Mar. 8, 1921)	Rep.	Markesan
17	Iowa		William M. Smith	Rep.	Linden
30	Iron & Vilas		Hyman M. Mark	Rep.	Hurley
31	Jackson		William F. Dettinger	Rep.	Hixton
33	Jefferson	1	Eugene H. Killian	Rep.	Watertown
33	Jefferson	2	Henry W. Stokes	Rep.	Waterloo
21	Juneau		Frank H. Hanson	Rep.	Mauston
03	Kenosha		Malcolm D. Farr	Rep.	Kenosha
01	Kewaunee		Anton Holly	Rep.	Carlton
32	La Crosse	1	Frank H. Fowler	Rep.	La Crosse
32	La Crosse	2	William F. Miller	Rep.	Barre
17	Lafayette		James U. Goodman	Rep.	Lamont
25	Langlade		Burt W. Rynders	Dem.	Antigo
30	Lincoln		Ray M. Atcherson	Rep.	Tomahawk
15	Manitowoc	1	John Lorfeld	Rep.	Meeme
15	Manitowoc	2	Thomas A. Sullivan	Rep.	Franklin
25	Marathon	1	Joseph Weix	Rep.	Colby
25	Marathon	2	Lewis H. Cook	Rep.	Wausau
01	Marinette		E. A. Burden	Rep.	
09	Milwaukee	1	Ben H. Mahon	Rep.	Milwaukee
09	Milwaukee	2	Martin M. Higgins	Rep.	Milwaukee
09	Milwaukee	3	Thomas H. Conway	Rep.	Milwaukee
05	Milwaukee	4	Charles Meising	Rep.	Milwaukee
08	Milwaukee	5	Edmund B. Grunwald	Rep.	Milwaukee
05	Milwaukee	6	Frederick Petersen	Rep.	Milwaukee
05	Milwaukee	7	Alex C. Ruffing	Soc.	Milwaukee
08	Milwaukee	8	Walter Polakowski	Soc.	Milwaukee
06	Milwaukee	9	Julius Kiesner	Soc.	Milwaukee
04	Milwaukee	10	Fred Hasley	Soc.	Milwaukee
08	Milwaukee	11	William E. Jordan	Soc.	Milwaukee
08	Milwaukee	12	Julius Jensen	Rep.	Milwaukee
04	Milwaukee	13	Leander J. Pierson	Rep.	Milwaukee
07	Milwaukee	14	Stephen Stolowski	Soc.	Milwaukee
05	Milwaukee	15	Theodore Engel	Rep.	Milwaukee
05	Milwaukee	16	John C. Schafer	Rep.	Milwaukee
07	Milwaukee	17	Edward Vollmer	Rep.	Milwaukee
04	Milwaukee	18	Frank L. Prescott	Rep.	Milwaukee
07	Milwaukee	19	Nicholas F. Lucas	Rep.	
31	Monroe		Miles Hineman	Rep.	Tomah
02	Oconto		Peter Ankerson	Rep.	Oconto
14	Outagamie	1	Mark S. Catlin	Rep.	Appleton
14	Outagamie	2	Anton M. Miller	Rep.	Kaukauna
20	Ozaukee		Louis L. Pierron	Rep.	Belgium
10	Pierce		Charles E. Hanson	Rep.	River Falls
29	Polk		George A. Nelson	Rep.	Milltown
23	Portage		William M. Scribner	Rep.	
12	Price		Joseph R. Farr	Rep.	Phillips
03	Racine	1	Wallace Ingalls	Rep.	Racine
03	Racine	2	Henry F. Johnson	Rep.	Norway
28	Richland		Elias R. Cushman	Rep.	Viola
22	Rock	1	Alexander E. Matheson	Rep.	Janesville
22	Rock	2	Edwin G. Fifield	Rep.	Beloit
12	Rusk & Sawyer		David J. Summerville	Rep.	
27	Sauk		Carl Koenig	Rep.	Westfield
14	Shawano		August Beversdorf	Rep.	Belle Plaine
20	Sheboygan	1	William G. Kaufmann	Rep.	Sheboygan
20	Sheboygan	2	Henry Ott	Rep.	Plymouth
10	St. Croix		George Oakes	Rep.	New Richmond
30	Taylor		John Gamper	Rep.	Medford
32	Trempealeau		Hans A. Anderson	Rep.	Whitehall
31	Vernon		Luther Roseland	Rep.	Viroqua
23	Walworth		Riley S. Young	Rep.	Darien
13	Washington		Alfred G. Becker	Rep.	Addison
33	Waukesha	1	William A. Freehoff	Rep.	Waukesha
33	Waukesha	2	W. H. Edwards	Rep.	Sussex
23	Waupaca		Fred Hess	Rep.	Clintonville
21	Waushara		Frank Ploetz	Rep.	Coloma
19	Winnebago	1	Clark M. Perry	Rep.	Oshkosh
19	Winnebago	2	Nels Larson	Rep.	Neenah
19	Winnebago	3	George H. Jones	Rep.	Algoma
24	Wood		William W. Clark	Rep.	Hansen

== Committees ==
=== Senate committees ===
- Senate Standing Committee on Committees – G. B. Skogmo, chair
- Senate Standing Committee on Contingent Expenditures – H. Huber, chair
- Senate Standing Committee on Corporations – G. B. Skogmo, chair
- Senate Standing Committee on Education and Public Welfare – A. Kuckuk, chair
- Senate Standing Committee on Highways – E. F. Clark, chair
- Senate Standing Committee on the Judiciary – J. A. Conant, chair
- Senate Standing Committee on Legislative Procedure – T. Burke, chair
- Senate Standing Committee on State Affairs – H. E. Roethe, chair

=== Assembly committees ===
- Assembly Standing Committee on Agriculture – W. Olson, chair
- Assembly Standing Committee on Commerce and Manufactures – J. E. Johnson, chair
- Assembly Standing Committee on Contingent Expenditures – J. C. Hanson, chair
- Assembly Standing Committee on Education – M. L. Hineman, chair
- Assembly Standing Committee on Elections – F. Hess, chair
- Assembly Standing Committee on Engrossed Bills – A. Becker, chair
- Assembly Standing Committee on Enrolled Bills – T. W. Bartingale, chair
- Assembly Standing Committee on Excise and Fees – R. M. Atcherson, chair
- Assembly Standing Committee on Fish and Game – M. S. Catlin, chair
- Assembly Standing Committee on Highways – R. Bullis, chair
- Assembly Standing Committee on Insurance and Banking – B. H. Mahon, chair
- Assembly Standing Committee on the Judiciary – J. B. French, chair
- Assembly Standing Committee on Labor – W. A. Freehoff, chair
- Assembly Standing Committee on Municipalities – C. M. Perry, chair
- Assembly Standing Committee on Printing – F. W. Downs, chair
- Assembly Standing Committee on Public Welfare – F. J. Petersen, chair
- Assembly Standing Committee on Revision – C. Weittenhiller, chair
- Assembly Standing Committee on Rules – J. B. French, chair
- Assembly Standing Committee on State Affairs – A. E. Matheson, chair
- Assembly Standing Committee on Taxation – W. H. Edwards, chair
- Assembly Standing Committee on Third Reading – J. T. Oliver, chair
- Assembly Standing Committee on Transportation – L. J. Pierson, chair

=== Joint committees ===
- Joint Standing Committee on Finance – R. J. Nye (Sen.) & G. Oakes (Asm.), co-chairs

== Employees ==
=== Senate employees ===
- Chief Clerk: Oliver G. Munson
  - Assistant Chief Clerk: Charles E. Mullen
- Sergeant-at-Arms: Vincent Kielpinski
  - Assistant Sergeant-at-Arms: Olaf Goldstrand
- Postmaster: Frank C. Densmore

=== Assembly employees ===
- Chief Clerk: C. E. Shaffer
  - Journal Clerk: W. A. Lawton
- Sergeant-at-Arms: Thomas Grant Cretney
  - Assistant Sergeant-at-Arms: Ernest F. Wright
- Postmaster: G. I. Brader
