= 56th Wisconsin Legislature =

Wisconsin legislative term for 1923–1924

←	55th	57th	→
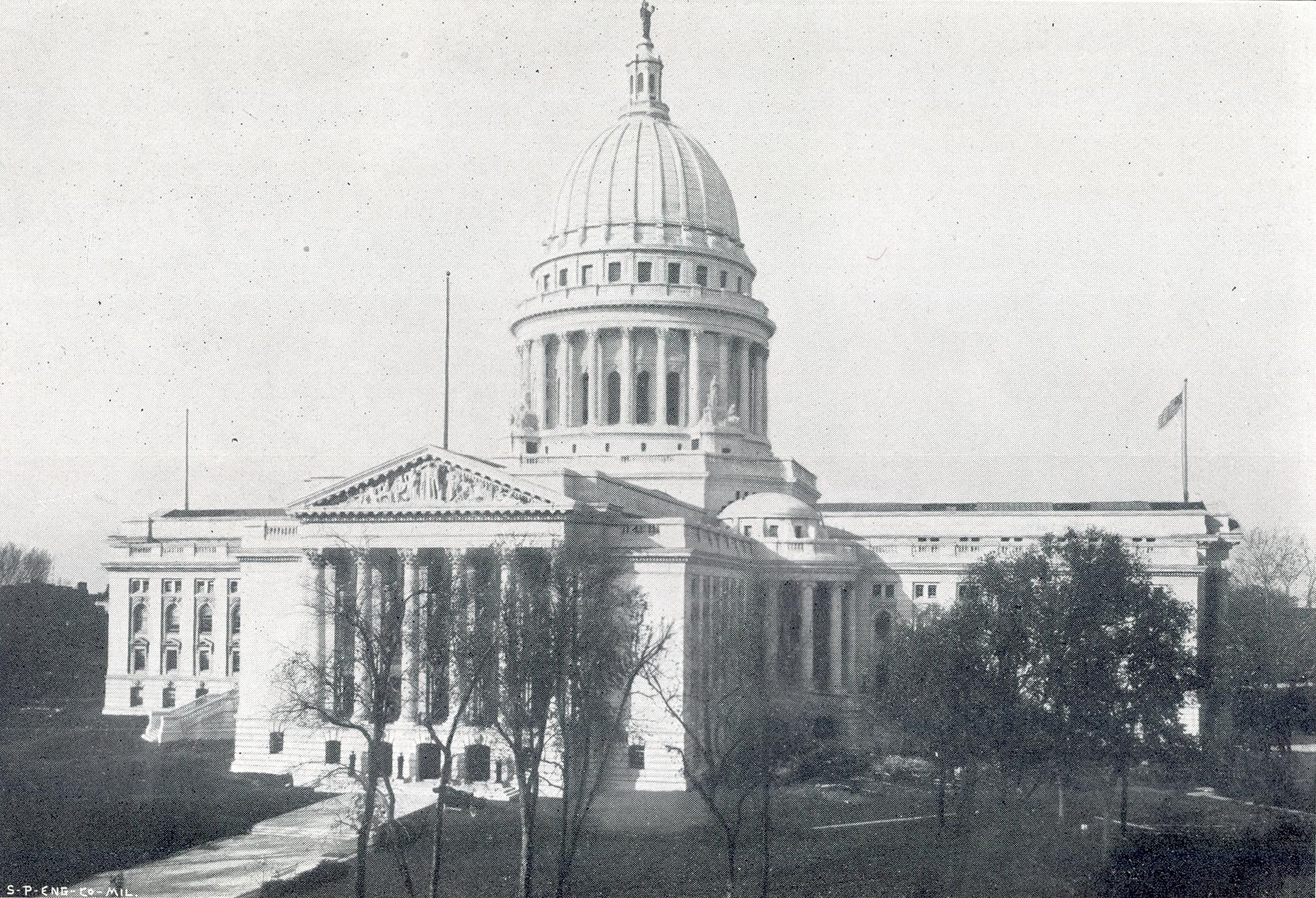
- Wisconsin State Capitol ca.1915

Overview
- Legislative body: Wisconsin Legislature
- Meeting place: Wisconsin State Capitol
- Term: January 1, 1923 – January 5, 1925
- Election: November 7, 1922

Senate
- Members: 33
- Senate President: George Comings (R)
- President pro tempore: Henry Huber (R)
- Party control: Republican

Assembly
- Members: 100
- Assembly Speaker: John L. Dahl (R)
- Party control: Republican

Sessions
- Regular: January 10, 1923 – July 14, 1923

The Fifty-Sixth Wisconsin Legislature convened from January 10, 1923, to July 14, 1923, in regular session.

This was the first legislative session after the redistricting of the Senate and Assembly according to an act of the previous session. This was the first session in Wisconsin history in which the Democratic Party held no seats in the State Senate, and with only one seat in the Assembly, this session represents the smallest legislative delegation for the Democratic Party of Wisconsin in its history (tied with 1925).

Senators representing odd-numbered districts were newly elected for this session and were serving the first two years of a four-year term. Assembly members were elected to a two-year term. Assembly members and odd-numbered senators were elected in the general election of November 7, 1922. Senators representing even-numbered districts were serving the third and fourth year of a four-year term, having been elected in the general election of November 3, 1920.

The governor of Wisconsin during this entire term was Republican John J. Blaine, of Grant County, serving his second two-year term, having won re-election in the 1922 Wisconsin gubernatorial election.

== Major events ==
- August 2, 1923: U.S. President Warren G. Harding died in office. He was immediately succeeded by Vice President Calvin Coolidge.
- April 1, 1924: Wisconsin voters rejected an amendment to the state constitution which would have raised legislator salary to $750 per year ($12,000 adjusted for inflation to 2023).
- May 24, 1924: U.S. President Calvin Coolidge signs the Immigration Act of 1924 into law. The law prohibited immigration from Asia and set limits on immigration from eastern and southern Europe, it also established visa requirements for travel to the United States.
- July 5, 1924: Wisconsin U.S. senator Robert M. La Follette accepted the nomination of the Progressive Party as their candidate for President of the United States.
- November 4, 1924: 1924 United States general election:
  - Calvin Coolidge elected to a full term as President of the United States. Wisconsin's electoral votes went to the Progressive nominee, home-state senator Robert M. La Follette.
  - John J. Blaine re-elected to a third term as Governor of Wisconsin.
  - Three women were elected to the Wisconsin State Assembly, the first in state history.
  - Wisconsin voters ratified three amendments to the state constitution:
    - to enable the Legislature to add judges to existing high-population circuits in the Wisconsin circuit courts system
    - to enable the Legislature to make appropriations for forestry improvements
    - to grant home rule to cities and villages

== Major legislation ==
- 1923 Joint Resolution 18. Second legislative passage of the proposed amendment to the state constitution to increase legislator pay to $750 per year. This was a second attempt to update legislator pay after Wisconsin voters rejected a different proposed amendment to allow legislators to set their own pay in 1920. This new amendment was also defeated by voters at the April 1924 election.
- 1923 Joint Resolution 34. Second legislative passage of the proposed amendment to the state constitution to allow the state to appropriate funds for forestry improvements. This amendment was ratified by voters at the November 1924 election.
- 1923 Joint Resolution 57. Second legislative passage of the proposed amendment to the state constitution to grant home rule to all cities and villages in the state. This amendment was ratified by voters at the November 1924 election.
- 1923 Joint Resolution 64. Second legislative passage of the proposed amendment to the state constitution to allow the legislature to add new Wisconsin ciruict court judges to high population circuits. This amendment was ratified by voters at the November 1924 election.

== Party summary ==
=== Senate summary ===
Senate partisan composition Socialist: 3 seats Republican: 30 seats

	Party (Shading indicates majority caucus)			Total	
	Dem.	Soc.	Rep.	Total	Vacant
End of previous Legislature	2	4	27	32	1
Start of 1st Session (Note: Republican Ole G. Kinney (District 11) died before the start of the term.)	0	3	29	32	1
From Feb. 27, 1923 (Note: Republican Marcus A. Kemp (District 11) was sworn in to replace Ole G. Kinney.)	0	3	30	33	0
From Oct. 25, 1924 (Note: Republican Ben H. Mahon (District 9) died.)	0	3	29	32	1
Final voting share	9.09%		90.91%		
Beginning of the next Legislature	0	4	29	33	0

=== Assembly summary ===
Assembly partisan composition Democratic: 1 seat Socialist: 10 seats Republican: 89 seats

	Party (Shading indicates majority caucus)			Total	
	Dem.	Soc.	Rep.	Total	Vacant
End of previous Legislature	2	6	92	100	0
Start of 1st Session	1	10	89	100	0
From Sep. 12, 1923 (Note: Republican James T. Oliver (Brown County) died.)	1	10	88	99	1
Final voting share	11%		89%		
Beginning of the next Legislature	1	7	92	100	0

== Sessions ==
- Regular session: January 10, 1923 – July 14, 1923

== Leaders ==
=== Senate leadership ===
- President of the Senate: George Comings (R)
- President pro tempore: Henry Huber (R–Stoughton)

=== Assembly leadership ===
- Speaker of the Assembly: John L. Dahl (R–Rice Lake)

== Members ==
=== Members of the Senate ===
Members of the Senate for the Fifty-Sixth Wisconsin Legislature:

Senate partisan representation Socialist: 3 seats Republican: 30 seats

Dist.	Counties	Senator	Residence	Party
01	Door, Kewaunee, & Manitowoc	John E. Cashman	Franklin	Rep.
02	Brown & Oconto	Timothy Burke	Green Bay	Rep.
03	Milwaukee (South City)	Walter Polakowski	Milwaukee	Soc.
04	Milwaukee (Northeast County & Northeast City)	Oscar Morris	Milwaukee	Rep.
05	Milwaukee (Northwest City)	Bernhard Gettelman	Milwaukee	Rep.
06	Milwaukee (North-Central City)	Joseph J. Hirsch	Milwaukee	Soc.
07	Milwaukee (Southeast County & Southeast City)	William F. Quick	Milwaukee	Soc.
08	Milwaukee (Western County)	George Czerwinski	Milwaukee	Rep.
09	Milwaukee (City Downtown)	Ben H. Mahon	Milwaukee	Rep.
10	Buffalo, Pepin, Pierce, & St. Croix	George B. Skogmo	River Falls	Rep.
11	Bayfield, Burnett, Douglas, & Washburn	--Vacant until Feb. 27, 1923--		
11	Bayfield, Burnett, Douglas, & Washburn	Marcus A. Kemp		Rep.
12	Ashland, Iron, Price, Rusk, Sawyer, & Vilas	Chester H. Werden	Ashland	Rep.
13	Dodge & Washington	Herman J. F. Bilgrien	Iron Ridge	Rep.
14	Outagamie & Shawano	Antone Kuckuk	Shawano	Rep.
15	Rock	Alva Garey	Edgerton	Rep.
16	Crawford, Grant, & Vernon	Henry E. Roethe	Fennimore	Rep.
17	Green, Iowa, & Lafayette	Olaf H. Johnson	Wiota	Rep.
18	Fond du Lac, Green Lake & Waushara	William A. Titus	Fond du Lac	Rep.
19	Calumet & Winnebago	Merritt F. White	Winneconne	Rep.
20	Ozaukee & Sheboygan	Theodore Benfey	Sheboygan	Rep.
21	Racine	Max W. Heck	Racine	Rep.
22	Kenosha & Walworth	Eldo T. Ridgway	Elkhorn	Rep.
23	Portage & Waupaca	Herman J. Severson	Iola	Rep.
24	Clark, Taylor, & Wood	William L. Smith	Neillsville	Rep.
25	Lincoln & Marathon	Joseph L. Barber	Marathon City	Rep.
26	Dane	Henry Huber	Stoughton	Rep.
27	Columbia, Richland, & Sauk	George Staudenmayer	Caledonia	Rep.
28	Chippewa & Eau Claire	Herman Lange	Eau Claire	Rep.
29	Barron, Dunn, & Polk	Carl B. Casperson	Frederic	Rep.
30	Florence, Forest, Langlade, Marinette, & Oneida	Bernard N. Moran	Rhinelander	Rep.
31	Adams, Juneau, Monroe, & Marquette	Howard Teasdale	Sparta	Rep.
32	Jackson, La Crosse, & Trempealeau	Eugene F. Clark	Galesville	Rep.
33	Jefferson & Waukesha	John C. Schumann	Watertown	Rep.

=== Members of the Assembly ===
Members of the Assembly for the Fifty-Sixth Wisconsin Legislature:

Assembly partisan composition Democratic: 1 seat Socialist: 10 seats Republican: 89 seats

Milwaukee County districts

Senate Dist.	County	Dist.	Representative	Party	Residence
31	Adams & Marquette		William Grahn	Rep.	Westfield
12	Ashland		Fred C. Smith	Rep.	Ashland
29	Barron		John L. Dahl	Rep.	Rice Lake
11	Bayfield		Alfred M. Warden	Rep.	Washburn
02	Brown	1	James T. Oliver	Rep.	Green Bay
02	Brown	2	Gustav J. Zittlow	Rep.	Lawrence
10	Buffalo & Pepin		Dutee A. Whelan	Rep.	Mondovi
11	Burnett & Washburn		Erick H. Johnson	Rep.	
19	Calumet		Carl Hillmann	Rep.	Rantoul
28	Chippewa		Charles Liehe	Rep.	Eagle Point
24	Clark		George W. Schmidt	Rep.	Delmar
27	Columbia		Robert Caldwell	Rep.	Lodi
16	Crawford		Albert C. Johnson	Rep.	Soldiers Grove
26	Dane	1	Herman W. Sachtjen	Rep.	Madison
26	Dane	2	James C. Hanson	Rep.	Christiana
26	Dane	3	Carl M. Grimstad	Rep.	Mount Horeb
13	Dodge	1	Herman A. Ziemer	Rep.	Emmet
13	Dodge	2	Fred E. Moul	Rep.	Burnett
01	Door		John Peltier	Rep.	
11	Douglas	1	Sextus Lindahl	Rep.	Superior
11	Douglas	2	Lewis H. Allen	Rep.	
29	Dunn		James D. Millar	Rep.	Red Cedar
28	Eau Claire		C. N. Saugen	Rep.	Pleasant Valley
30	Florence, Forest, & Oneida		Joseph D. Grandine	Rep.	Argonne
18	Fond du Lac	1	Math Koenigs	Rep.	
18	Fond du Lac	2	Thomas Dieringer	Rep.	Campbellsport
16	Grant	1	George Slack	Rep.	Platteville
16	Grant	2	Charles E. Tuffley	Rep.	Boscobel
17	Green		Fred K. Hefty	Rep.	
18	Green Lake & Waushara		Newcomb Spoor	Rep.	Berlin
17	Iowa		Charles W. Hutchison	Rep.	Mineral Point
12	Iron & Vilas		Hyman M. Mark	Rep.	Hurley
32	Jackson		William F. Dettinger	Rep.	Hixton
33	Jefferson		Eugene H. Killian	Rep.	Watertown
31	Juneau		Clinton G. Price	Rep.	Mauston
22	Kenosha	1	Conrad Shearer	Rep.	Kenosha
22	Kenosha	2	Don J. Vincent	Rep.	
01	Kewaunee		Anton Holly	Rep.	Carlton
32	La Crosse	1	Henry Nein	Rep.	La Crosse
32	La Crosse	2	William F. Miller	Rep.	Barre
17	Lafayette		James U. Goodman	Rep.	Lamont
30	Langlade		James A. Barker	Rep.	Antigo
25	Lincoln		Richard Kamke	Dem.	Merrill
01	Manitowoc	1	Robert Naumann	Rep.	
01	Manitowoc	2	Fred A. Fredrich	Rep.	Maple Grove
25	Marathon	1	John W. Salter	Rep.	Unity
25	Marathon	2	Henry Ellenbecker	Rep.	Wausau
30	Marinette		James Pedersen	Rep.	Marinette
09	Milwaukee	1	Thomas H. Conway	Rep.	Milwaukee
09	Milwaukee	2	Michael Laffey	Rep.	Milwaukee
04	Milwaukee	3	Frank J. Weber	Soc.	Milwaukee
04	Milwaukee	4	Thomas Duncan	Soc.	Milwaukee
07	Milwaukee	5	H. G. Tucker	Soc.	Milwaukee
06	Milwaukee	6	Frederick Petersen	Rep.	Milwaukee
06	Milwaukee	7	Alex C. Ruffing	Soc.	Milwaukee
03	Milwaukee	8	John Polakowski	Soc.	Milwaukee
06	Milwaukee	9	Julius Kiesner	Soc.	Milwaukee
08	Milwaukee	10	John W. Eber	Rep.	Milwaukee
03	Milwaukee	11	Olaf C. Olsen	Soc.	Milwaukee
05	Milwaukee	12	Lawrence J. Timmerman	Rep.	Milwaukee
04	Milwaukee	13	Richard Elsner	Soc.	Milwaukee
07	Milwaukee	14	George Gauer	Soc.	Milwaukee
05	Milwaukee	15	Theodore Engel	Rep.	Milwaukee
08	Milwaukee	16	Charles B. Perry	Rep.	Wauwatosa
07	Milwaukee	17	John Herman Koch	Rep.	Lake
04	Milwaukee	18	Frank L. Prescott	Rep.	Milwaukee
08	Milwaukee	19	George C. Hinkley	Rep.	West Allis
05	Milwaukee	20	Albert F. Woller	Soc.	Milwaukee
31	Monroe		Edward Eirschele	Rep.	Clifton
02	Oconto		Peter Ankerson	Rep.	Oconto
14	Outagamie	1	Charles M. Schrimpf	Rep.	Appleton
14	Outagamie	2	Anton M. Miller	Rep.	Kaukauna
20	Ozaukee		Fred J. Busse	Rep.	Mequon
10	Pierce		Charles E. Hanson	Rep.	River Falls
29	Polk		George A. Nelson	Rep.	Milltown
23	Portage		Ben Halverson	Rep.	New Hope
12	Price		Arvid Blomberg	Rep.	
21	Racine	1	W. Grant Nelson	Rep.	Racine
21	Racine	2	Jacob Stoffel Jr.	Rep.	Racine
21	Racine	3	John H. Kamper	Rep.	Raymond
27	Richland		Elias R. Cushman	Rep.	Viola
15	Rock	1	Alexander E. Matheson	Rep.	Janesville
15	Rock	2	Herbert Moseley	Rep.	Beloit
12	Rusk & Sawyer		David J. Summerville	Rep.	
27	Sauk		Dwight S. Welch	Rep.	
14	Shawano		August Beversdorf	Rep.	Belle Plaine
20	Sheboygan	1	Jacob Jung	Rep.	Sheboygan
20	Sheboygan	2	Henry Ott	Rep.	Plymouth
10	St. Croix		Ethan B. Minier	Rep.	New Richmond
24	Taylor		John Gamper	Rep.	Medford
32	Trempealeau		George Schmidt	Rep.	Arcadia
16	Vernon		August E. Smith	Rep.	Viroqua
22	Walworth		Frank E. Lawson	Rep.	Walworth
13	Washington		Alfred G. Becker	Rep.	Addison
33	Waukesha	1	William A. Freehoff	Rep.	Waukesha
33	Waukesha	2	Homer Dopp	Rep.	
23	Waupaca		George W. Meggers	Rep.	Clintonville
19	Winnebago	1	Charles Rahr	Rep.	Oshkosh
19	Winnebago	2	George H. Jones	Rep.	Algoma
24	Wood		Elwyn E. Royce	Rep.	Marshfield

== Committees ==
=== Senate committees ===
- Senate Standing Committee on Committees – H. J. Severson, chair
- Senate Standing Committee on Contingent Expenditures – H. E. Roethe, chair
- Senate Standing Committee on Corporations – H. J. Severson, chair
- Senate Standing Committee on Education and Public Welfare – E. T. Ridgway, chair
- Senate Standing Committee on Highways – J. E. Cashman, chair
- Senate Standing Committee on the Judiciary – H. Teasdale, chair
- Senate Standing Committee on State Affairs – W. A. Titus, chair

=== Assembly committees ===
- Assembly Standing Committee on Agriculture – J. C. Hanson, chair
- Assembly Standing Committee on Commerce and Manufactures – F. J. Petersen, chair
- Assembly Standing Committee on Contingent Expenditures – F. E. Moul, chair
- Assembly Standing Committee on Education – J. D. Millar, chair
- Assembly Standing Committee on Elections – W. F. Miller, chair
- Assembly Standing Committee on Engrossed Bills – W. F. Dettinger, chair
- Assembly Standing Committee on Enrolled Bills – P. Ankerson, chair
- Assembly Standing Committee on Excise and Fees – J. Peltier, chair
- Assembly Standing Committee on Fish and Game – N. Spoor, chair
- Assembly Standing Committee on Highways – G. A. Nelson, chair
- Assembly Standing Committee on Insurance and Banking – A. C. Johnson, chair
- Assembly Standing Committee on the Judiciary – H. W. Sachtjen, chair
- Assembly Standing Committee on Labor – E. H. Killian, chair
- Assembly Standing Committee on Municipalities – E. B. Minier, chair
- Assembly Standing Committee on Printing – A. Holly, chair
- Assembly Standing Committee on Public Welfare – C. M. Grimstad, chair
- Assembly Standing Committee on Revision – G. H. Jones, chair
- Assembly Standing Committee on Rules – H. W. Sachtjen, chair
- Assembly Standing Committee on State Affairs – J. Goodman, chair
- Assembly Standing Committee on Taxation – C. E. Hanson, chair
- Assembly Standing Committee on Third Reading – A. G. Becker, chair
- Assembly Standing Committee on Transportation – H. Ott, chair

=== Joint committees ===
- Joint Standing Committee on Finance – H. Huber (Sen.) & C. E. Tuffley (Asm.), co-chairs

== Employees ==
=== Senate employees ===
- Chief Clerk: F. W. Schoenfeld
  - Assistant Chief Clerk: Charles E. Mullen
- Sergeant-at-Arms: Charles A. Leicht
  - Assistant Sergeant-at-Arms: John J. Knudsen
- Postmaster: Joseph V. Janda

=== Assembly employees ===
- Chief Clerk: C. E. Shaffer
  - Journal Clerk: W. A. Lawton
- Sergeant-at-Arms: Thomas W. Bartingale
  - Assistant Sergeant-at-Arms: Olaf Goldstrand
- Postmaster: Frank C. Densmore

== Changes from the 55th Legislature ==
New districts for the 56th Legislature were defined in 1921 Wisconsin Act 470, passed into law in the 55th Wisconsin Legislature.

=== Senate redistricting ===
==== Summary of Senate changes ====
- 12 districts were left unchanged
- Milwaukee County went from having 6 districts to 7 (3, 4, 5, 6, 7, 8, 9).
- Racine County became a single district again (21) after previously having been in a shared district with Kenosha.
- Rock County became a single district again (15) after previously having been in a shared district with Walworth.

==== Senate districts ====
Dist.	55th Legislature	56th Legislature
1	Door, Kewaunee, Marinette counties	Door, Kewaunee, Manitowoc counties
2	Brown, Oconto counties	Brown, Oconto counties
3	Kenosha, Racine counties	Milwaukee County (city south)
4	Milwaukee County (northern quarter)	Milwaukee County (northeast)
5	Milwaukee County (central-west)	Milwaukee County (city northwest)
6	Milwaukee County (city north)	Milwaukee County (city north-central)
7	Milwaukee County (southern)	Milwaukee County (southeast)
8	Milwaukee County (city south)	Milwaukee County (west)
9	Milwaukee County (city center)	Milwaukee County (city center)
10	Buffalo, Pepin, Pierce, St. Croix counties	Buffalo, Pepin, Pierce, St. Croix counties
11	Burnett, Douglas, Washburn counties	Bayfield, Burnett, Douglas, Washburn counties
12	Ashland, Bayfield, Price, Rusk, Sawyer counties	Ashland, Iron, Price, Rusk, Sawyer, Vilas counties
13	Dodge, Washington counties	Dodge, Washington counties
14	Outagamie, Shawano counties	Outagamie, Shawano counties
15	Calumet, Manitowoc counties	Rock County
16	Crawford, Grant, Richland counties	Crawford, Grant, Vernon counties
17	Green, Iowa, Lafayette counties	Green, Iowa, Lafayette counties
18	Fond du Lac, Green Lake counties	Fond du Lac, Green Lake, Waushara counties
19	Winnebago County	Calumet, Winnebago counties
20	Ozaukee, Sheboygan counties	Ozaukee, Sheboygan counties
21	Adams, Juneau, Marquette, Waushara counties	Racine County
22	Rock, Walworth counties	Kenosha, Walworth counties
23	Portage, Waupaca counties	Portage, Waupaca counties
24	Clark, Wood counties	Clark, Taylor, Wood counties
25	Langlade, Marathon counties	Lincoln, Marathon counties
26	Dane County	Dane County
27	Columbia, Sauk counties	Columbia, Richland, Sauk counties
28	Chippewa, Eau Claire counties	Chippewa, Eau Claire counties
29	Barron, Dunn, Polk counties	Barron, Dunn, Polk counties
30	Florence, Forest, Iron, Lincoln, Oneida, Taylor, Vilas counties	Florence, Forest, Langlade, Marinette, Oneida counties
31	Jackson, Monroe, Vernon counties	Adams, Juneau, Monroe, Marquette counties
32	La Crosse, Trempealeau counties	Jackson, La Crosse, Trempealeau counties
33	Jefferson, Waukesha counties	Jefferson, Waukesha counties

=== Assembly redistricting ===
==== Summary of Assembly changes ====
- At least 56 districts were left unchanged.
- Green Lake and Waushara became a shared district after previously having been separate districts.
- Jefferson County went from having 2 districts to 1.
- Kenosha County went from having 1 district to 2.
- Milwaukee County went from having 19 districts to 20.
- Racine County went from having 2 districts to 3.
- Winnebago County went from having 3 districts to 2.

==== Assembly districts ====
County	Districts in 55th Legislature	Districts in 56th Legislature	Change
Adams	Shared with Marquette	Shared with Marquette	Steady
Ashland	1 District	1 District	Steady
Barron	1 District	1 District	Steady
Bayfield	1 District	1 District	Steady
Brown	2 Districts	2 Districts	Steady
Buffalo	Shared with Pepin	Shared with Pepin	Steady
Burnett	Shared with Washburn	Shared with Washburn	Steady
Calumet	1 District	1 District	Steady
Chippewa	1 District	1 District	Steady
Clark	1 District	1 District	Steady
Columbia	1 District	1 District	Steady
Crawford	1 District	1 District	Steady
Dane	3 Districts	3 Districts	Steady
Dodge	2 Districts	2 Districts	Steady
Door	1 District	1 District	Steady
Douglas	2 Districts	2 Districts	Steady
Dunn	1 District	1 District	Steady
Eau Claire	1 District	1 District	Steady
Florence	Shared with Forest & Oneida	Shared with Forest & Oneida	Steady
Fond du Lac	2 Districts	2 Districts	Steady
Forest	Shared with Florence & Oneida	Shared with Florence & Oneida	Steady
Grant	2 Districts	2 Districts	Steady
Green	1 District	1 District	Steady
Green Lake	1 District	Shared with Waushara	▼
Iowa	1 District	1 District	Steady
Iron	Shared with Vilas	Shared with Vilas	Steady
Jackson	1 District	1 District	Steady
Jefferson	2 Districts	1 District	▼
Juneau	1 District	1 District	Steady
Kenosha	1 District	2 Districts	▲
Kewaunee	1 District	1 District	Steady
La Crosse	2 Districts	2 Districts	Steady
Lafayette	1 District	1 District	Steady
Langlade	1 District	1 District	Steady
Lincoln	1 District	1 District	Steady
Manitowoc	2 Districts	2 Districts	Steady
Marathon	2 Districts	2 Districts	Steady
Marinette	1 District	1 District	Steady
Marquette	Shared with Adams	Shared with Adams	Steady
Milwaukee	19 Districts	20 Districts	▲
Monroe	1 District	1 District	Steady
Oconto	1 District	1 District	Steady
Oneida	Shared with Florence, Forest	Shared with Florence, Forest	Steady
Outagamie	2 Districts	2 Districts	Steady
Ozaukee	1 District	1 District	Steady
Pepin	Shared with Buffalo	Shared with Buffalo	Steady
Pierce	1 District	1 District	Steady
Polk	1 District	1 District	Steady
Portage	1 District	1 District	Steady
Price	1 District	1 District	Steady
Racine	2 Districts	3 Districts	▲
Richland	1 District	1 District	Steady
Rock	2 Districts	2 Districts	Steady
Rusk	Shared with Sawyer	Shared with Sawyer	Steady
Sauk	1 District	1 District	Steady
Sawyer	Shared with Rusk	Shared with Rusk	Steady
Shawano	1 District	1 District	Steady
Sheboygan	2 Districts	2 Districts	Steady
St. Croix	1 District	1 District	Steady
Taylor	1 District	1 District	Steady
Trempealeau	1 District	1 District	Steady
Vernon	1 District	1 District	Steady
Vilas	Shared with Iron	Shared with Iron	Steady
Walworth	1 District	1 District	Steady
Washburn	Shared with Burnett	Shared with Burnett	Steady
Washington	1 District	1 District	Steady
Waukesha	2 Districts	2 Districts	Steady
Waupaca	1 District	1 District	Steady
Waushara	1 District	Shared with Green Lake	▼
Winnebago	3 Districts	2 Districts	▼
Wood	1 District	1 District	Steady
