= Sonnemann =

Sonnemann is a surname. Notable people with the surname include:

- Emmy Göring (née Sonnemann; 1893–1973), German actress, and the second wife of Hermann Göring
- Ernest A. Sonnemann (1858–1927), American politician
- Leopold Sonnemann (1831–1909), German journalist, newspaper publisher, and political party leader
