= Senator Kemp =

Senator Kemp may refer to:

- Brian Kemp (born 1963), Georgia State Senate
- Marcus A. Kemp (1878–1957), Wisconsin State Senate
- RaShaun Kemp ((fl. 2020s), Georgia State Senate
- René D. Kemp (1935–2006), Georgia State Senate
- Rod Kemp (born 1944), Senate of Australia

== See also ==
- John J. Kempf (1857–?), Wisconsin State Senate
