= Jacob Jung =

American politician

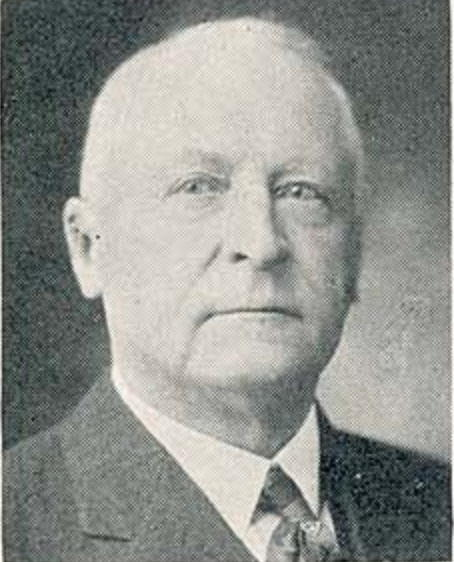
Jacob Jung, Wisconsin Assemblyman - 1923

Jacob Jung, Jr. (January 11, 1857 – May 3, 1931) was an businessman and politician from Sheboygan, Wisconsin.

== Early life ==
Jung was born January 11, 1857, son of German-born Jacob (originally Jakob) and Eleonore Jung, in the city of Sheboygan. He attended Lutheran parochial schools and Sheboygan High School.

== Career ==
He learned the carriage- and wagonmakers trade, and worked fourteen years at it before buying out his father's business, the Jung Carriage Company, and running it until 1917. In 1882, he married Louise Winter. In 1888 he also went into the mercantile business and founded the J. and W. Jung Company department store, which he ran with two of his sons.

== Public office ==
In 1922, he was elected to represent the 1st Sheboygan County district of the Wisconsin State Assembly (the City of Sheboygan) as a Republican, with 3,747 votes to 2,173 votes for Socialist Ernest Kreuter (the incumbent, Republican William G. Kaufmann, was not a candidate). He was assigned to the standing committees on municipalities and revision.

He did not seek re-election to the Assembly, and was succeeded by fellow Republican Ernst A. Sonnemann. Later, Jung served one term on the Sheboygan County Board of Supervisors.

== Death and heritage ==
Jung died at his home in Sheboygan, Wisconsin after being ill for a few months, leaving behind his widow and five children.

One of his descendants founded the Wesley W. Jung Carriage Museum, part of the Wade House Historic Site open-air museum in Greenbush, Wisconsin.
