= Malcolm A. Sellers =

American politician (1854-1930)

Member of the Wisconsin State Assembly from the Brown 1st district
- In office January 5, 1925 – January 7, 1929
- Preceded by: James T. Oliver
- Succeeded by: Harold C. Malchow

Personal details
- Born: October 26, 1854 Waukesha, Wisconsin, U.S.
- Died: April 22, 1930 (aged 75) Green Bay, Wisconsin, U.S.
- Resting place: Prairie Home Cemetery, Waukesha, Wisconsin
- Party: Republican
- Occupation: Mail carrier, livery business, lumber business

Malcolm A. Sellers (October 26, 1854 – April 22, 1930) was an American businessman, mail carrier, and Republican politician from Green Bay, Wisconsin. He represented Green Bay as a member of the Wisconsin State Assembly during the 1925 and 1927 sessions.

== Biography ==
Malcolm Sellers was born in Waukesha, Wisconsin, in October 1854. He received a common school education at Waukesha, but then moved Fort Howard, Wisconsin, with his parents in his teenage years. As a young man, he went into the lumber business with his father.

In 1883, he went west to the Arizona Territory, where he was employed by the federal government as a postal clerk for the Railway Mail Service. He returned to Green Bay in 1891 and went into the livery business. In 1894, he was elected to his first public office as a member of the Brown County board of supervisors. In 1895, he was appointed deputy sheriff of Brown County, and then became a rural mail carrier in the county, and then served as superintendent of the Brown County workhouse from 1904 to 1906. He then returned to the mail business as a contractor in Green Bay for most of the next decade, then served as a bridge inspector for the city.

He was elected to the Wisconsin State Assembly in 1924 and 1926 without facing any opposition. He represented Brown County's first Assembly district, which then comprised just the city of Green Bay.

He did not run for a third term in 1928 and returned to his post as bridge inspector. He died just a year after leaving office, after suffering several years from a disease. He died at his home in Green Bay on April 22, 1930.

== Personal life and family ==
Malcolm Sellers was never married and had no known children. At the time of his death, he lived with his sister, Margaret, who was his last known living relative.

Wisconsin State Assembly
Preceded by James T. Oliver	Member of the Wisconsin State Assembly from the Brown 1st district January 5, 1925 – January 7, 1929	Succeeded by Harold C. Malchow
