= Barre Mills, Wisconsin =

- Unincorporated community
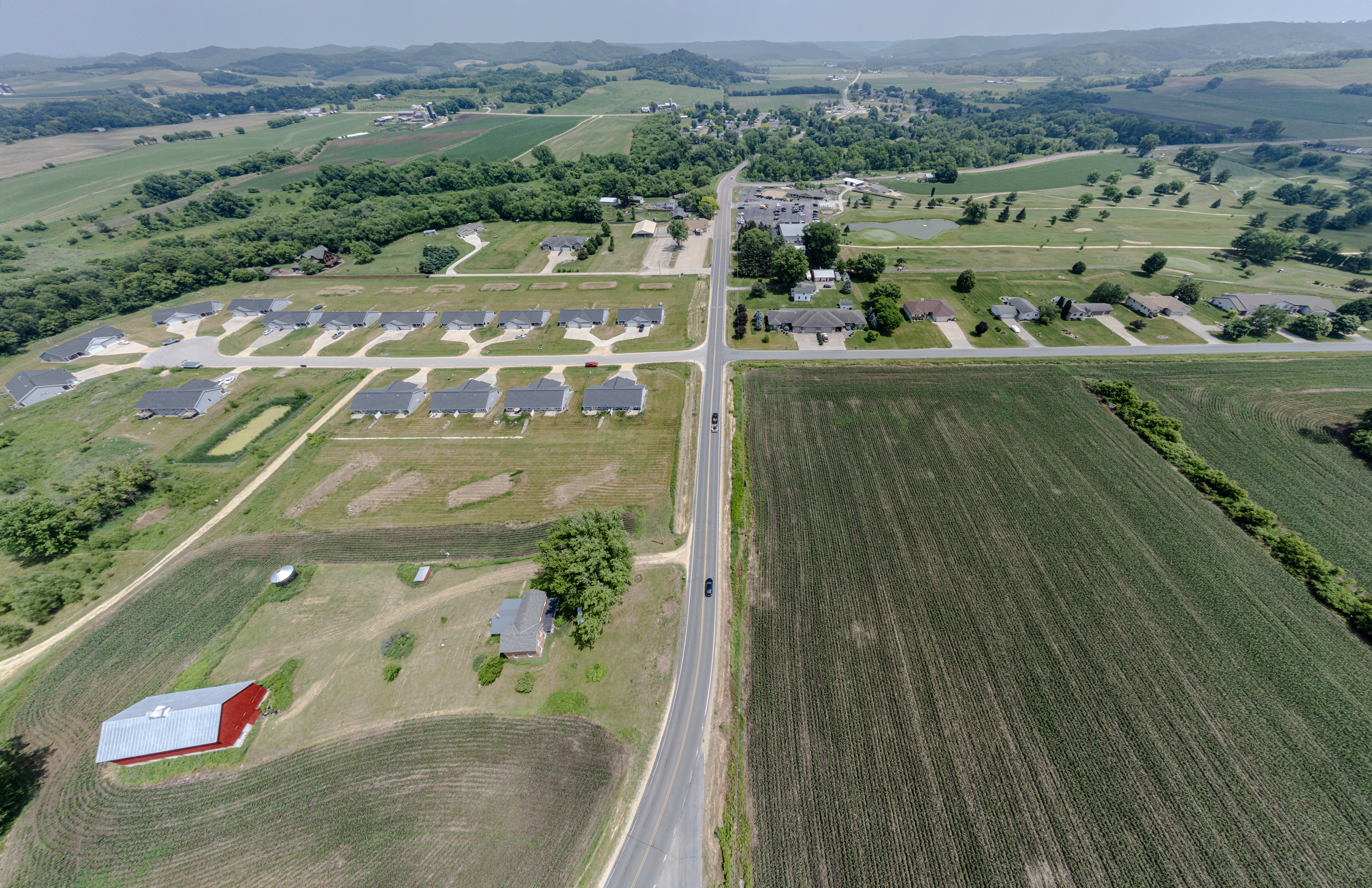

- Location within Wisconsin Location within the United States
- Coordinates: 43°50′29″N 91°06′50″W
- Country: United States
- State: Wisconsin
- County: La Crosse
- Town: Barre
- Elevation: 725 ft (221 m)
- Time zone: UTC-6 (Central (CST))
  - Summer (DST): UTC-5 (CDT)
- Area code: 608
- GNIS feature ID: 1561196

Barre Mills (/ˈbæri/ BARR-ee) is a small unincorporated community in the town of Barre in La Crosse County, Wisconsin, United States. It is part of the La Crosse Metropolitan Statistical Area.

== History ==
Samuels' Cave, an important rock shelter among ancient people, is located in Barre Mills. It is on the National Register of Historic Places.

Barre Mills was also home to a Freethinkers Society. The society hall is now the Barre town hall.
