= Whitehall School District =

School district in Whitehall Wisconsin, United States

Whitehall School District (WSD) is a school district based in Whitehall, Wisconsin. As of 2024 it has about 720 students in all grades (K-12), and has elementary and high school levels.

Mike Beighly began as superintendent in 2003.

Response To Pandemic (2020) To deal with the COVID-19 pandemic in Wisconsin the district enacted live video and co-op models so the district could continue doing in-person instruction. The students were able to connect together as a class from their homes on chromebooks, while being able to complete assigned work for their classes, in organized google classrooms. The students were still able to see each other, just not physically, which helped students be more included with each other and the class.

WSD's Tech Center In mid 2024, the school recently bought a building across the street from the main school, and is now a tech center for students and the school's new esports team. The new building consists of technological machinery throughout the building that is used to teach students how to manage and operate the machinery. Thanks to the help of the Wanek family's donations to provide for the cost of the building, and the machines. Many of the new classes involve helping students take a deeper look into the new technology, and the many opportunities inside the workforce. The school is one of the most advanced in the area for this addition and will continue to educate kids for a long time. The building is truly an astonishing accomplishment for the school and is greatly appreciated by the students and educators of WSD.
