= Whitehall station (Wisconsin) =

Historic building

Whitehall
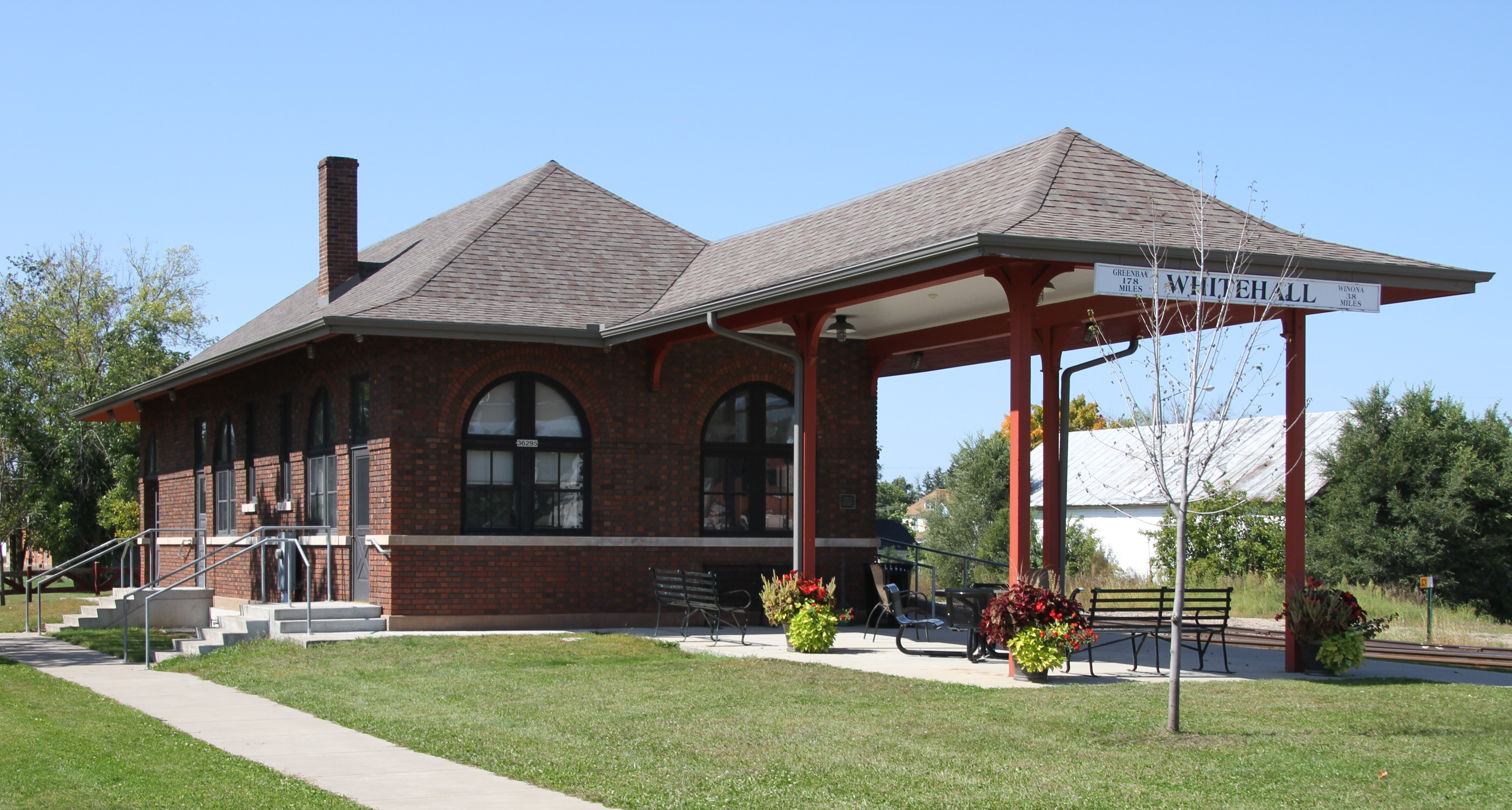
- Whitehall station in September 2017.

General information
- Location: 36295 Main Street; Whitehall, Wisconsin
- Coordinates: 44°22′6″N 91°19′3″W
- System: Former Green Bay and Western passenger rail station
- Line: CN Whitehall Subdivision

History
- Opened: 1914
- Closed: April 13, 1949
- Green Bay and Western Railroad Depot
- U.S. National Register of Historic Places
- Location within Wisconsin
- Location: 36295 Main Street; Whitehall, Wisconsin
- Coordinates: 44°22′6″N 91°19′3″W
- Built: 1914
- NRHP reference No.: 06000302
Location

The Green Bay and Western Railroad Depot is located in Whitehall, Wisconsin. It was added to the National Register of Historic Places in 2006.

== History ==
The small brick depot was built in 1914 by the Green Bay and Western Railroad with separate waiting rooms for men and women. It replaced an earlier wooden depot built in 1877 by the Green Bay and Lake Pepin Railroad. Passenger train service to Whitehall ended on April 13, 1949, when the GB&W discontinued service between Green Bay and Winona.
