= James S. Towers =

American politician

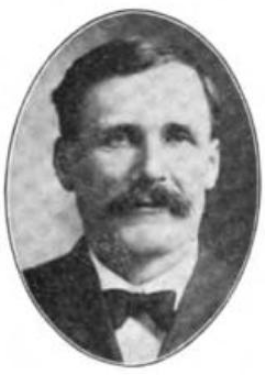

Member of the Wisconsin State Assembly
- In office 1908–1910
- Constituency: Columbia County First District

Personal details
- Born: James Shanks Towers; April 24, 1859 Caledonia, Columbia County, Wisconsin
- Died: April 18, 1926 (aged 66) Portage, Wisconsin
- Party: Republican
- Occupation: Farmer, businessman, politician

James Shanks Towers (April 24, 1859 – April 18, 1926) was an American farmer, businessman, and politician.

Born in the town of Caledonia, Columbia County, Wisconsin, Towers went to Portage High School in Portage, Wisconsin. Towers was a farmer and served on the board of directors of the Merrimac State Bank. Towers served as chairman of the Caledonia Town Board and on the Columbia County Board of Supervisors. He also served on the school board. In 1909, Towers served in the Wisconsin State Assembly and was a Republican. Towers died at his home in Portage, Wisconsin from a long illness.
