= Samuels' Cave =

Archeological site in Wisconsin, US

- U.S. National Register of Historic Places
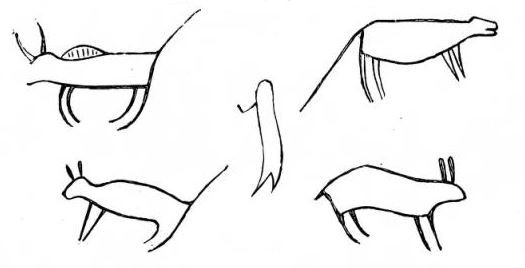
- Some of Brown's tracings from the cave, not in their original arrangement
- Nearest city: Barre Mills, Wisconsin
- NRHP reference No.: 86003275
- Added to NRHP: June 11, 1991

Samuels' Cave, also known as Brown's Cave, Pictured Cave, or Mystery Cave, is a prehistoric, naturally formed rock shelter located in La Crosse County, Wisconsin. The cave contains petroglyphs and pictographs from the Native Americans who lived in the area. It was listed on the National Register of Historic Places in 1991.

The cave is a 30-foot (9.1 m) deep hole in the sandstone, discovered by 18-year-old Frank Samuel while trapping raccoons in 1878. He squeezed into a hole that an animal had dug in a bank and emerged into a dark cavity. On the walls, the young coon-hunter found simple images left by people before him. That winter some local boys built fires inside their secret cave and carved their own names on the walls.

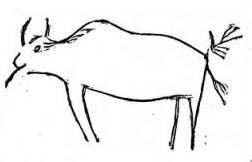
Brown's tracing of one of the carvings, as it appeared in 1879.

The following summer the Rev. Edward Brown visited Samuels' cave. He traced the carvings and persuaded Frank's father to open the mouth of the cave and protect the interior. Brown reported the finding to the State Geologist and the State Historical Society, and they sent antiquarian archaeologist John Rice to direct the excavation of the floor. They uncovered four layers of ashes separated by layers of clean sand ten to fourteen inches thick. The second layer contained sherds of pottery made from clay and ground shells. The third layer contained more elaborate pottery, bivalve shells, and a bone tool. Brown and Rice interpreted the layers as four occupations of the cave with long intervals of vacancy between. When the rock shelter was occupied, its mouth had been fifteen feet wide, but a landslide had sealed it until the animal burrowed through. Based on trees growing on the landslide, Brown and Rice estimated the landslide had occurred at least 150 years before. Modern archeologists recognize the shell-tempered pottery that Brown described as a hallmark of the Oneota people, so at least some of the artwork was probably produced by them, which places it from 1300 to 1625 A.D.

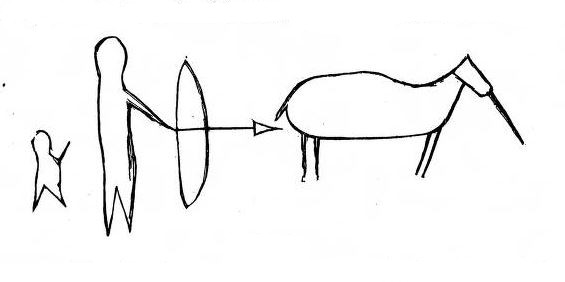

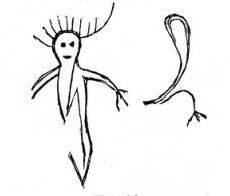

Some images on the walls were carved and some were painted. There were animals which Brown interpreted as bisons, lynx, rabbit, otter, badger, elk and heron. One panel showed a hunter and an elk. Another showed a hunter pointing a bow and arrow at a deer, with a child behind him. Another showed a human figure with a head-dress, which Brown interpreted as a chief. Other designs were indecipherable.

In 1984 archaeologists from the Mississippi Valley Archaeological Center at the University of Wisconsin–La Crosse visited Samuels' Cave and noticed a panel of charcoal drawings on the back wall which had not been recorded before. (Photos of some of these drawings are online at MVAC's Rock Art website, linked among the notes below.)

Many of the images in the cave were pretty intact when Frank Samuel found them in 1878, since they had been protected by the landslide for many years. But once the mouth of the cave was reopened, moisture and temperature changes resumed working away at the sandstone. Over the years many people visited the cave, some carving their own marks on the walls. After all this, many of the prehistoric images have been badly damaged, so the cave is no longer open to the public.

More of Brown's tracings from the cave, as the images appeared in 1879:

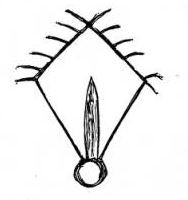

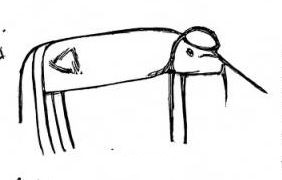

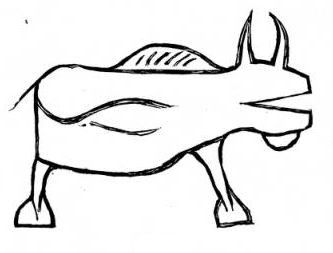

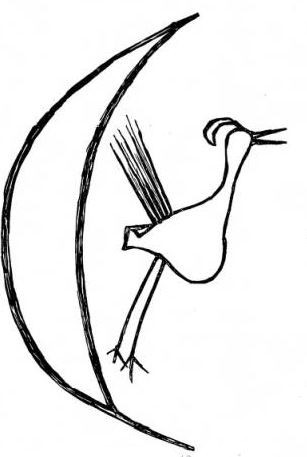

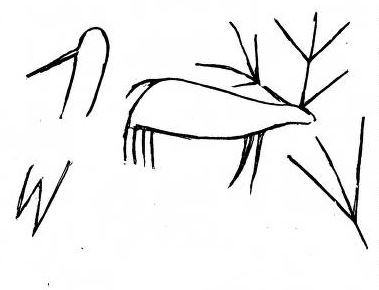

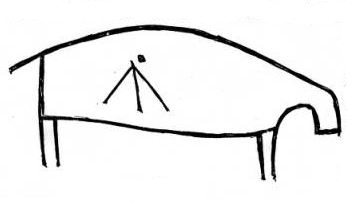

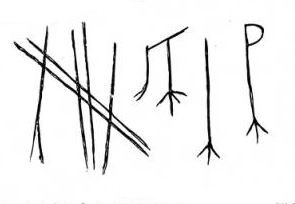

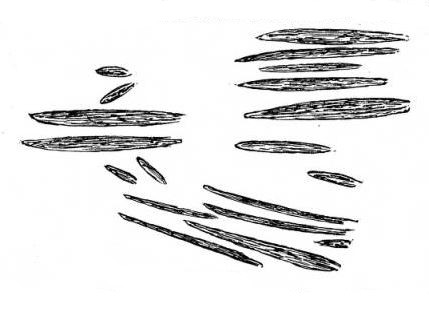
