= Conrad J. Weittenhiller =

American politician and businessman (1855–1927)

Conrad J. Weittenhiller (September 27, 1855 – November 7, 1927) was an American businessman, farmer, politician.

== Personal life ==
Born in Platteville, Wisconsin, Weittenhiller went to public school and to Platteville Normal School. He worked as a cooper and was a farmer. He was also involved with the creamery cooperative and the mining business. Weittenhiller died in his home, in Platteville, Wisconsin, from a fall.

== Political career ==
Wettemhiller served on the Grant County, Wisconsin, Board of Supervisors and on the school board. In 1921, Weittenhiller served in the Wisconsin State Assembly and was a Republican. During his time in office, he introduced a bill seeking to make out-of-state marriages subject to registration and the Wisconsin eugenics law.
