= Hansen, Wisconsin =

Town of Hansen, Wisconsin
- Town
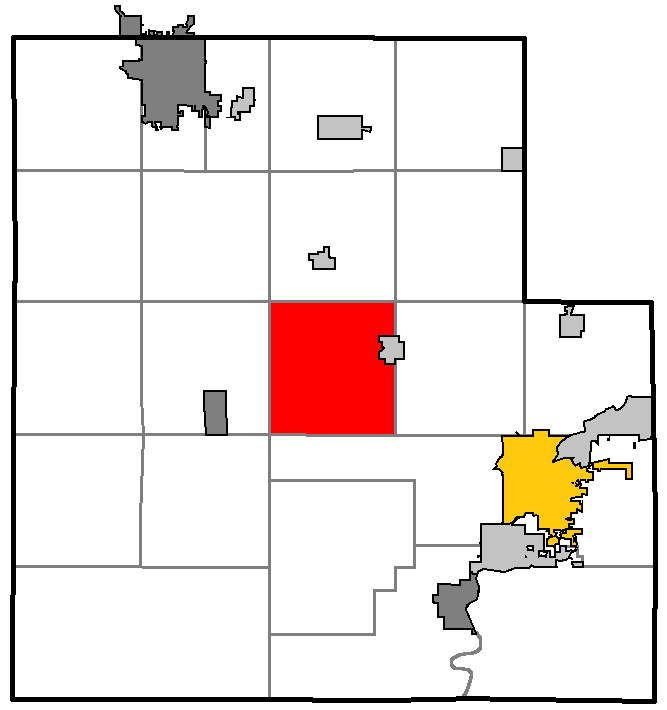
- Location of the Town of Hansen, Wood County

- Location of Wood County, Wisconsin
- Coordinates: 44°27′49″N 90°01′32″W
- Country: United States
- State: Wisconsin
- County: Wood

Area
  - Total: 33.9 sq mi (87.7 km^{2})
  - Land: 33.9 sq mi (87.7 km^{2})
  - Water: 0 sq mi (0.0 km^{2})
- Elevation: 1,070 ft (326 m)

Population (2020)
  - Total: 747
  - Density: 22.1/sq mi (8.52/km^{2})
- Time zone: UTC-6 (Central (CST))
  - Summer (DST): UTC-5 (CDT)
- Area codes: 715 & 534
- FIPS code: 55-32575
- GNIS feature ID: 1583348
- PLSS township: T23N R4E
- Website: https://townofhansen.gov/

The Town of Hansen is located in Wood County, Wisconsin, United States. The population was 747 at the 2020 census.

== History ==
In the summer of 1851 crews working for the U.S. government surveyed the outline of the six-mile square that would become Hansen. That November another crew marked all the section corners, walking through the woods and wading the swamps, measuring with chain and compass. When done, the deputy surveyor filed this general description:

The general character of this Township is swampy although there is some good land in it the soil is poor & being somewhat stony renders it almost valueless for farming purposes the timber is large & generally of (?) growth except the Pine which is mostly 2d growth & very poor. the streams are fed by the swamps and are subject to very sudden rise & fall the timber is of various kinds such as soft-maple sugar Pine (TamaracK & alder in the swamps) Linn Oak Ash Ironwood +c, the stone are a Blue Flint.

The Town of Hansen was established in 1901 and named after the now-extinct railroad hamlet of Hansen.

== Geography ==
The town comprises roughly a six-mile square. According to the United States Census Bureau, the town has a total area of 33.9 square miles (88 km^{2}), all land.

== Demographics ==
As of the census of 2000, there were 707 people, 255 households, and 197 families residing in the town. The population density was 20.9 people per square mile (8.1/km^{2}). There were 272 housing units at an average density of 8.0 per square mile (3.1/km^{2}). The racial makeup of the town was 99.43% White, 0.14% African American, and 0.42% from two or more races. Hispanic or Latino of any race were 0.57% of the population.

There were 255 households, out of which 34.5% had children under the age of 18 living with them, 69.8% were married couples living together, 3.5% had a female householder with no husband present, and 22.4% were non-families. 20.4% of all households were made up of individuals, and 7.5% had someone living alone who was 65 years of age or older. The average household size was 2.77 and the average family size was 3.20.

In the town, the population was spread out, with 27.0% under the age of 18, 8.8% from 18 to 24, 27.7% from 25 to 44, 23.6% from 45 to 64, and 12.9% who were 65 years of age or older. The median age was 38 years. For every 100 females, there were 109.2 males. For every 100 females age 18 and over, there were 111.5 males.

The median income for a household in the town was $41,932, and the median income for a family was $44,773. Males had a median income of $31,719 versus $24,861 for females. The per capita income for the town was $16,159. About 3.9% of families and 5.3% of the population were below the poverty line, including 6.8% of those under age 18 and 4.6% of those age 65 or over.
