= Hans A. Anderson =

American politician

Hans Alfred Anderson (March 4, 1855 – October 9, 1939) was an American jurist and politician.

Born in Norway, Anderson emigrated with his parents to the United States in 1867. He studied law at the University of Wisconsin Law School and then practiced law in Whitehall, Wisconsin. He served as district attorney for Trempealeau County, Wisconsin in 1889 and 1890 and served as county judge for Trempealeau County from 1910 to 1920. In 1921, Anderson served in the Wisconsin State Assembly and was a Republican. Anderson died at his home in Whitehall, Wisconsin.
