= George C. Hinkley =

American businessman and politician

George C. Hinkley (August 13, 1862 – September 12, 1936) was an American businessman and politician.

Hinkley was born in Saginaw County, Michigan. He went to the Milwaukee, Wisconsin public schools. He was involved in the flour mill business and lived in West Allis, Wisconsin. Hinkley was also involved in the real estate, insurance, and banking business. He served in the Wisconsin Assembly from 1923 to 1929 and was a Republican. He died at his home in West Allis, Wisconsin after a long illness.
