= James T. Oliver =

American engineer and politician

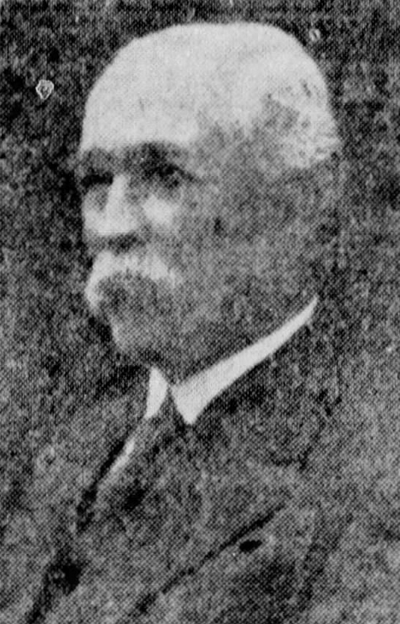

Member of the Wisconsin State Assembly from the Brown 1st district
- In office January 3, 1921 – September 12, 1923 (died)
- Preceded by: Thomas A. Delaney
- Succeeded by: Malcolm A. Sellers

Personal details
- Born: August 18, 1849 Yorkshire, England, UK
- Died: September 12, 1923 (aged 74) Green Bay, Wisconsin, U.S.
- Cause of death: Heart attack
- Party: Republican
- Profession: Marine engineer

James T. Oliver (August 18, 1849 – September 12, 1923) was an English American immigrant, marine engineer, and Republican politician. He was a member of the Wisconsin State Assembly, representing Brown County during the 1921 and 1923 sessions.

== Biography ==
Born in Yorkshire, England, Oliver was educated in Yorkshire. In 1864, Oliver emigrated to the United States. He worked on the railroad in Massachusetts, Rhode Island, New Jersey, and Pennsylvania. In 1872, he moved to De Pere, Wisconsin, and worked in the railroad car shops. He then went to Green Bay, Wisconsin, and then to Wisconsin Rapids, Wisconsin. Oliver finally returned to Green Bay. He was a marine engineer for many years. From 1921 until his death in 1923, Oliver served in the Wisconsin State Assembly and was a Republican. Oliver died suddenly of a heart attack at his home in Green Bay, Wisconsin.
