= William F. Miller (politician) =

American politician (1869–1954)

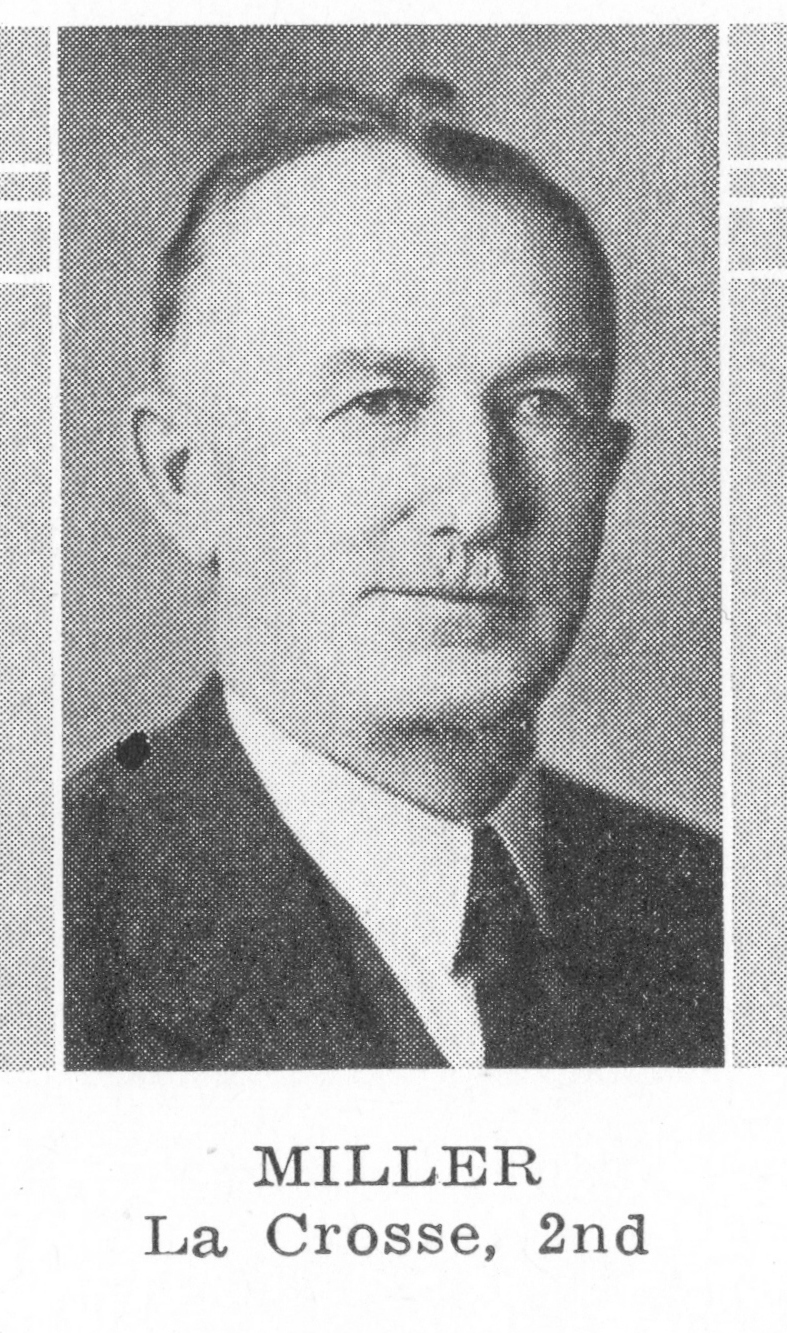

Member of the Wisconsin State Assembly
- In office 1939–1944
- In office 1929–1932
- In office 1921–1924

Personal details
- Born: September 24, 1869 Barre, Wisconsin, US
- Died: September 7, 1954 (aged 84) La Crosse, Wisconsin, US
- Party: Republican

William F. Miller (1869–1954) was a member of the Wisconsin State Assembly.

Miller was born on September 24, 1869, in Barre, Wisconsin. He later resided in West Salem, Wisconsin. Miller was a member of the state assembly three times. First, from 1921 to 1924, second, from 1929 to 1932 and third, from 1939 to 1944. He was a Republican. He died in La Crosse on September 7, 1954.
