= William Grahn =

American politician

William A. Grahn or Grahm (February 15, 1874 - ?) was an American farmer, storekeeper and miller who served a single term in the Wisconsin State Assembly as a Republican from 1923 to 1924.

== Background ==
Grahn was born near Montello in Marquette County, Wisconsin on February 15, 1874. He received a public school education. For a number of years he was engaged in farming and in 1922 was operating a store and mill at Lawrence, Marquette county. Grahn was one of the early organizers for the Wisconsin section of the American Society of Equity. He was the first member of the organization in Chippewa County and organized the local at Bob Creek. He lived in Chippewa County from 1898 to 1911. He then moved to Marquette County.

== Public office ==
Grahn served one term as town clerk of Westfield and from 1917 to 1918 was undersheriff of Marquette county. He was elected to the assembly in November, 1922, without opposition from the district which included Adams and Marquette counties.

He was defeated in the 1924 general election by Robert B. Wood, who had taken the Republican nomination, with 3,042 votes to 1,111 for W. A. Crothers (who had also run in the Republican primary), 880 for Democrat Earl Stafford, and 389 for Grahn. He ran again in 1932, coming in third in a four-person Republican primary. In 1934, he came in second in a three-way race for the nomination of the newly organized Wisconsin Progressive Party to Edwin Blomquist, who would go on to win the general election. He tried again in 1938, coming in second once more to Blomquist in the Progressive primary, although Blomquist would be unable to retain his seat.
