= Edwin G. Fifield =

American businessman and politician

Edwin G. Fifield (June 15, 1862 – December 19, 1925) was an American businessman and politician.

Born in Janesville, Wisconsin, Fifield operated a lumber and fuel business in Pewaukee, Wisconsin in 1879 and 1880 for his father. Fifield then worked as a bookkeeper and assistant manager for his family's lumber business in Janesville. In 1887, Fifield was involved in the jewelry business. In 1904, Fifield moved to Beloit, Wisconsin to manage his family's real estate business. During World War I, Fifield was the government appeals agent for the local draft board. In 1921, Fifield served in the Wisconsin State Assembly and was a Republican. Fifield worked in ticket sales for the Wisconsin State Fair. In 1925, his body was found in the Rock River in Beloit, Wisconsin. It was not known how he drowned although Fifield had recently suffered a nervous breakdown.
