= Samuel Owens =

American politician

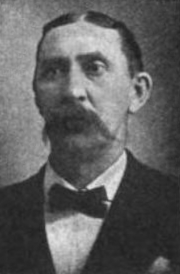

Member of the Wisconsin State Assembly
- In office 1919–1921

Personal details
- Born: April 23, 1856 Cambria, Wisconsin, US
- Died: January 15, 1921 (aged 64) Green Lake, Wisconsin
- Party: Republican
- Occupation: Architect, builder, politician

Samuel Owens (April 23, 1856 – January 15, 1921) was an American architect, builder, and politician.

== Biography ==
Born in Cambria, Wisconsin, Owens was an architect and builder in Green Lake, Wisconsin. He served as Green Lake County, Wisconsin clerk and register of deeds. From 1919 until his death in 1921, Owens served in the Wisconsin State Assembly and was a Republican. Owens died of heart disease at his home in Green Lake, Wisconsin after a long illness. Ira W. Parker was elected to the Wisconsin Assembly to fill the vacancy cause by Owens's death.
