= Edward Vollmer =

American politician

Edward F. Vollmer (June 1, 1877 – November 4, 1939) was an American politician who was a member of the Wisconsin State Assembly in Wisconsin during the 1921 Session. He was a Republican.

Vollmer went to Spencerian Business School, learned telegraphy, and worked in his father's grocery business. He was the chief timekeeper at the Milwaukee plant to the Illinois Steel Company.
