= Marcus A. Kemp =

American politician (1878–1957)

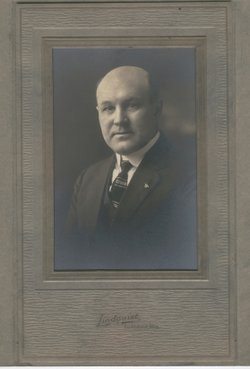

Member of the Wisconsin Senate from the 11th district
- In office Feb. 27, 1923 – January 3, 1927
- Preceded by: Ray J. Nye
- Succeeded by: R. Bruce Johnson

Personal details
- Born: November 25, 1878 Colborne, Ontario, Canada
- Died: October 17, 1957 (aged 78) Proctor, Minnesota, U.S.
- Resting place: Oneota Cemetery, Duluth, Minnesota
- Party: Republican
- Spouse: Dessie Irans “Jessie” Howenstine Kemp (m. 1921–1957)

Marcus Arnold Kemp (September 25, 1878 – October 17, 1957) was a Canadian American immigrant, machinist, and Republican politician. He was a member of the Wisconsin Senate, representing Wisconsin's 11th Senate district during the 1923 and 1925 sessions.

== Early life ==
Marcus Arnold Kemp was born on September 25, 1878, in Colborne, Ontario.

== Career ==
On February 3, 1923, Kemp was elected to the Senate in a special election to fill the vacancy caused by the death of Ole G. Kinney. Kemp was a member of the Republican Party of Wisconsin.

== Personal life ==
Kemp married Dessie Howenstine in 1921. The two remained married until his death on October 17, 1957, in Proctor, Minnesota. He was buried in the Oneota Cemetery, located in St. Louis County, Minnesota.
