= Ira W. Parker =

American politician

Ira Willard Parker (April 9, 1877 – August 23, 1960) was an American businessman and politician.

Born in Kingston, Green Lake County, Wisconsin, Parker went to the public schools in Markesan, Wisconsin and St. Cloud, Minnesota. Parker was president of Markesan State Bank. He married Margie Wood in 1915 and, following her death in 1939, married Irma Hill in 1940. On February 28, 1921, Parker was elected to the Wisconsin State Assembly, as a Republican, in a special election caused by the death of Samuel Owens, who had served in the Wisconsin Assembly since 1919. Parker later served on the Green Lake County Board of Supervisors. Parker died at his home in Markesan, Wisconsin after a long illness.
