= Jacob Stoffel Jr. =

American politician (1861–1927)

Jacob Stoffel Jr. (July 2, 1861 – March 30, 1927) was an American businessman and politician.

Born in Racine, Wisconsin, Stoffel went to the public schools and to the Parson Business College. Stoffel was in the dry goods business and was involved with the Stoffel Brothers business. He was also involved with the banking business. He served on the Racine Common Council. Stoffel also served on the Racine School Board and was the president of the school board. Stoffel served on the Racine Parks Board. In 1923, Stoffel served in the Wisconsin State Assembly as a Republican. Stoffel died in Racine, Wisconsin from a long illness.
