= Charles M. Schrimpf =

American politician and businessman

Charles Max Schrimpf (May 31, 1890 – January 22, 1932) was an American politician and businessman.

Schrimpf was born in Milwaukee, Wisconsin. He went to the public schools and was a farmer, clerk, and cigar manufacturer. Schrimpf and his wife lived in Appleton, Wisconsin. Schrimpf served in the Wisconsin Assembly from 1923 to 1925 and was a Republican. He died suddenly from a heart attack at his home in Appleton, Wisconsin.
