= Whitehall, Wisconsin =

- City
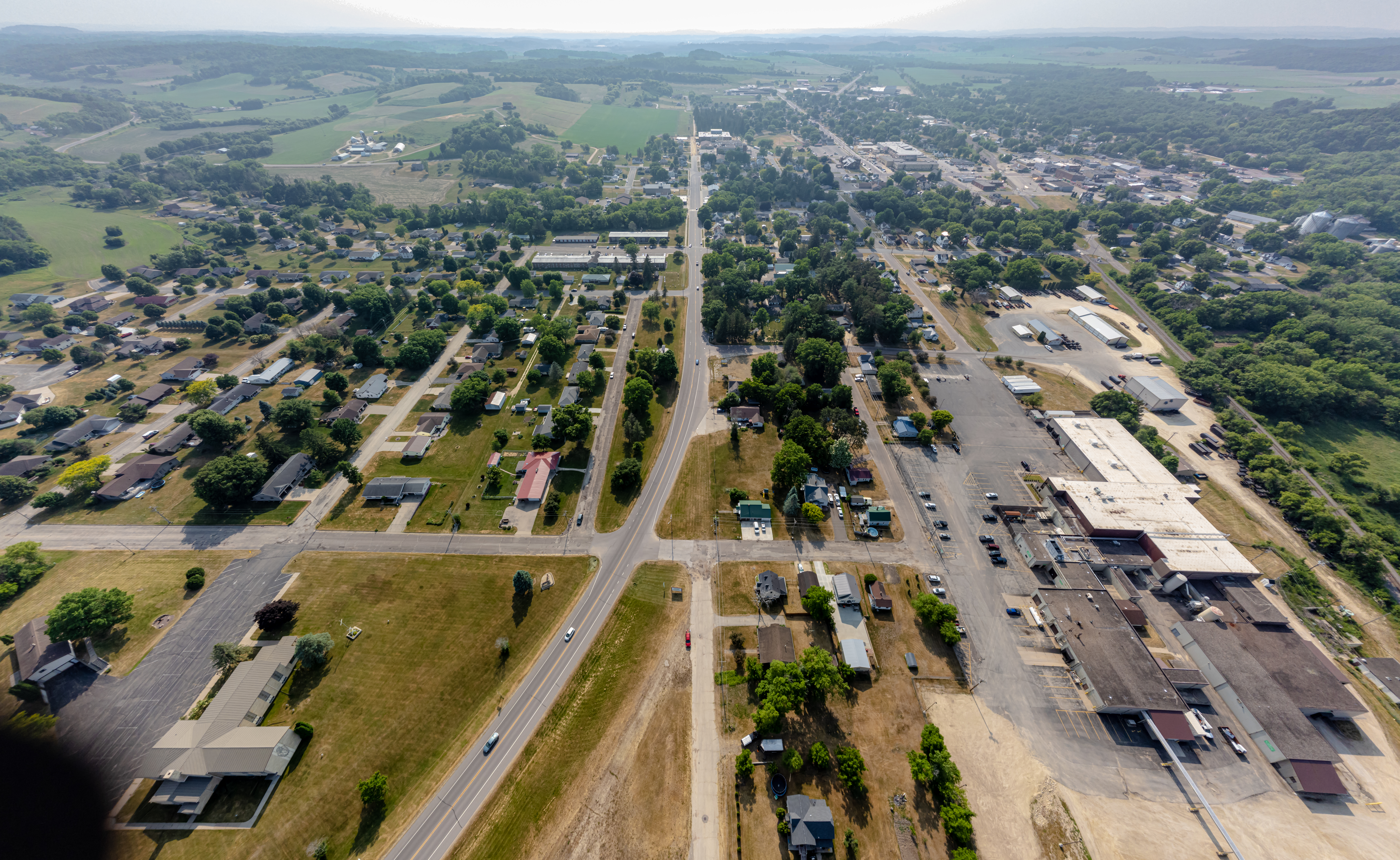

- Location of Whitehall in Trempealeau County, Wisconsin.

- Location within Wisconsin Location within the United States
- Coordinates: 44°22′0″N 91°18′59″W
- Country: United States
- State: Wisconsin
- County: Trempealeau

Area
  - Total: 3.80 sq mi (9.85 km^{2})
  - Land: 3.80 sq mi (9.85 km^{2})
  - Water: 0 sq mi (0.00 km^{2})
- Elevation: 817 ft (249 m)

Population (2020)
  - Total: 1,645
  - Density: 413.2/sq mi (159.53/km^{2})
- Time zone: UTC-6 (Central (CST))
  - Summer (DST): UTC-5 (CDT)
- ZIP Code: 54773
- Area codes: 715 & 534
- FIPS code: 55-86725
- GNIS feature ID: 1576681
- Website: www.whitehallwi.com

Whitehall is a city and the county seat of Trempealeau County, Wisconsin, United States, along the Trempealeau River. The population was 1,645 at the 2020 census.

Whitehall is situated on the former Green Bay and Western Railroad midway between La Crosse and Eau Claire.

== History ==
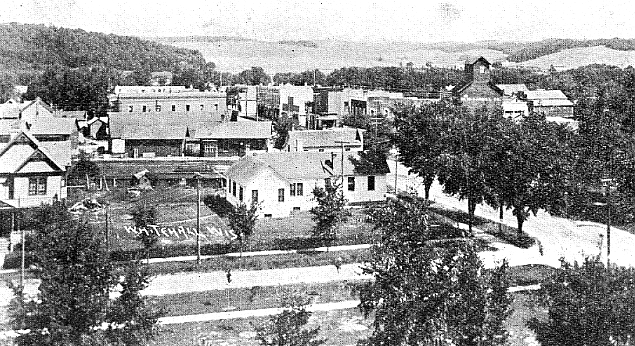
Whitehall, 1911

Whitehall was started in 1860 or 1861, in an area later known as Old Whitehall about a mile from the center of the current city, by Ole Knudtson. He came to Whitehall June 25, 1860, and opened a hotel and blacksmith shop. The proprietors of the town site were Benjamin Franklin Wing and Mr. Georges. A post office called Whitehall was first established in 1861. The city was named by Benjamin F. Wing, possibly after White Hall, Illinois and Whitehall, New York.

The Green Bay railroad was built through the valley of the Trempealeau River in 1873. "The tracks were laid through the wheat field that is now Whitehall, on Sept. 2, 1873. ... Where the courthouse now stands, the harvesters were gathering wheat. ... On New Year's Day, 1874, the first passenger train passed Whitehall on regular schedule. That same day the lumber was unloaded for the first depot ..." Whitehall was incorporated in 1887.

== Geography ==
According to the United States Census Bureau, the city has a total area of 2.80 square miles (7.25 km^{2}), all land.

== Demographics ==
Historical population
Census	Pop.	Note	%±
1880	267		—
1890	304		13.9%
1900	600		97.4%
1910	703		17.2%
1920	851		21.1%
1930	915		7.5%
1940	1,035		13.1%
1950	1,379		33.2%
1960	1,446		4.9%
1970	1,486		2.8%
1980	1,530		3.0%
1990	1,494		−2.4%
2000	1,651		10.5%
2010	1,558		−5.6%
2020	1,645		5.6%
U.S. Decennial Census

=== 2010 census ===
As of the census of 2010, there were 1,558 people, 665 households, and 382 families living in the city. The population density was 556.4 inhabitants per square mile (214.8/km^{2}). There were 741 housing units at an average density of 264.6 per square mile (102.2/km^{2}). The racial makeup of the city was 96.9% White, 0.4% African American, 0.1% Native American, 0.4% Asian, 1.5% from other races, and 0.6% from two or more races. Hispanic or Latino of any race were 4.2% of the population.

There were 665 households, of which 27.4% had children under the age of 18 living with them, 43.8% were married couples living together, 9.5% had a female householder with no husband present, 4.2% had a male householder with no wife present, and 42.6% were non-families. 36.4% of all households were made up of individuals, and 16.5% had someone living alone who was 65 years of age or older. The average household size was 2.24 and the average family size was 2.92.

The median age in the city was 42 years. 23.2% of residents were under the age of 18; 7.6% were between the ages of 18 and 24; 22.7% were from 25 to 44; 26.7% were from 45 to 64; and 19.7% were 65 years of age or older. The gender makeup of the city was 48.8% male and 51.2% female.

=== 2000 census ===
As of the census of 2000, there were 1,651 people, 693 households, and 415 families living in the city. The population density was 991.2 people per square mile (381.7/km^{2}). There were 733 housing units at an average density of 440.1 per square mile (169.5/km^{2}). The racial makeup of the city- fairly typical for its locality- was 99.64% White, 0.12% African American, 0.06% Native American, 0.06% Asian, 0.06% from other races, and 0.06% from two or more races. Hispanic or Latino of any race were 0.30% of the population.

There were 693 households, out of which 29.9% had children under the age of 18 living with them, 48.3% were married couples living together, 8.5% had a female householder with no husband present, and 40.0% were non-families. 35.6% of all households were made up of individuals, and 20.6% had someone living alone who was 65 years of age or older. The average household size was 2.25 and the average family size was 2.95.

In the city, the population was spread out, with 23.7% under the age of 18, 6.7% from 18 to 24, 26.3% from 25 to 44, 21.4% from 45 to 64, and 21.9% who were 65 years of age or older. The median age was 40 years. For every 100 females, there were 92.4 males. For every 100 females age 18 and over, there were 89.5 males.

The median income for a household in the city was $33,958, and the median income for a family was $48,047. Males had a median income of $28,643 versus $21,332 for females. The per capita income for the city was $17,743. About 4.1% of families and 7.3% of the population were below the poverty line, including 7.3% of those under age 18 and 7.6% of those age 65 or over.

== Education ==
Whitehall School District operates area public schools.

== Infrastructure ==
Whitehall previously had passenger rail service at the Whitehall Depot.

== Notable people ==
- Hans A. Anderson, jurist and politician
- Kathy Charmaz, educator
- Joe Diffie, musician
- Mary Forsythe, Minnesota State Representative
- Callista Gingrich, United States Ambassador to the Holy See and wife of Newt Gingrich
- Steve Gunderson, U.S. Representative
- John F. Hager, Wisconsin State Representative
- Rodney C. Moen, Wisconsin State

== See also ==
- Independence, Wisconsin
