= George Staudenmayer =

American politician

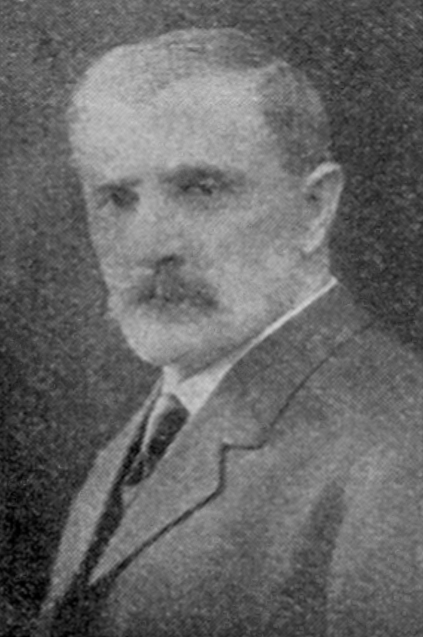

Member of the Wisconsin State Senate
- In office 1914–1926

Personal details
- Born: December 3, 1857 Caledonia, Wisconsin
- Died: November 27, 1939 (aged 81) Caledonia, Wisconsin
- Political party: Democratic; Republican
- Spouse: Margaret McLeish
- Education: Farmer

George Staudenmayer (December 3, 1857 – November 27, 1939) was a member of the Wisconsin State Senate.

== Biography ==
Staudenmayer was born on December 3, 1857, in Caledonia, Columbia County, Wisconsin to Eva Margarethe Naser and John G. Staudenmayer. He made his living farming and threshing. He married Margaret McLeish (1864–1914), with whom he raised at least nine children. Staudenmayer died at his home in Caledonia on November 27, 1939, and is interred in Portage, Wisconsin.

== Political career ==
Staudenmayer was first elected to the Senate in 1914 as a Democrat. In 1918 and 1922, he was re-elected as a Republican. In addition, he was chairman of Caledonia.
