= Belle Plaine, Wisconsin =

- Town
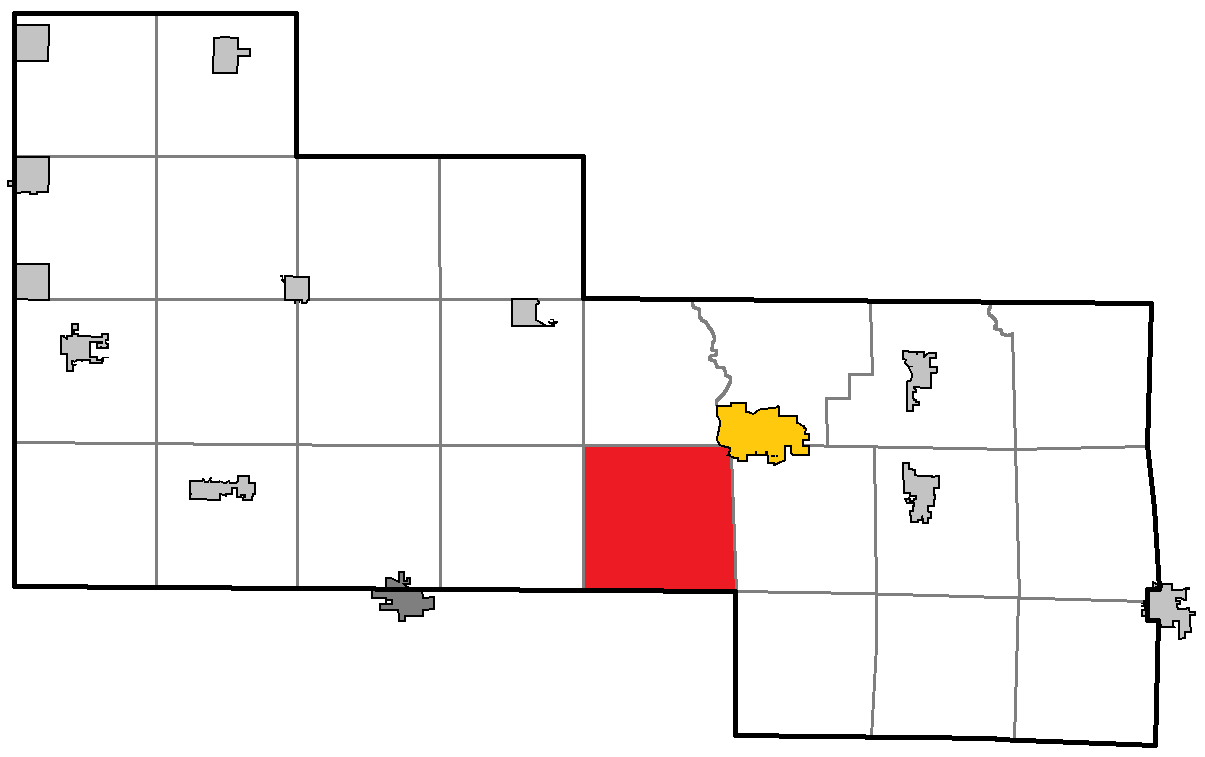
- Location of Belle Plaine, within Shawano County
- Coordinates: 44°42′16″N 88°39′32″W
- Country: United States
- State: Wisconsin
- County: Shawano

Area
  - Total: 39.2 sq mi (101.4 km^{2})
  - Land: 38.4 sq mi (99.4 km^{2})
  - Water: 0.77 sq mi (2.0 km^{2})
- Elevation: 840 ft (256 m)

Population (2020)
  - Total: 1,800
  - Density: 47/sq mi (18/km^{2})
- Time zone: UTC-6 (Central (CST))
  - Summer (DST): UTC-5 (CDT)
- FIPS code: 55-06275
- GNIS feature ID: 1582785
- Website: http://belleplainewi.com/

Belle Plaine is a town in Shawano County, Wisconsin, United States. The population was 1,800 at the 2020 census. The unincorporated communities of Adams Beach and Belle Plaine are located in the town. The former unincorporated community of Hunting was located partially in the town.

== History ==
Belle Plaine is derived from the French meaning "beautiful plain."

== Geography ==
According to the United States Census Bureau, the town has a total area of 39.2 square miles (101.4 km^{2}), of which 38.4 square miles (99.4 km^{2}) is land and 0.8 square mile (2.0 km^{2}) (1.97%) is water.

== Demographics ==
As of the census of 2000, there were 1,867 people, 738 households, and 543 families residing in the town. The population density was 48.6 people per square mile (18.8/km^{2}). There were 964 housing units at an average density of 25.1 per square mile (9.7/km^{2}). The racial makeup of the town was 96.73% White, 2.04% Native American, 0.43% Asian, 0.05% Pacific Islander, and 0.75% from two or more races. Hispanic or Latino of any race were 0.21% of the population.

There were 738 households, out of which 26.6% had children under the age of 18 living with them, 66.0% were married couples living together, 4.3% had a female householder with no husband present, and 26.3% were non-families. 22.2% of all households were made up of individuals, and 9.2% had someone living alone who was 65 years of age or older. The average household size was 2.41 and the average family size was 2.80.

In the town, the population was spread out, with 19.8% under the age of 18, 6.2% from 18 to 24, 24.7% from 25 to 44, 30.9% from 45 to 64, and 18.4% who were 65 years of age or older. The median age was 45 years. For every 100 females, there were 101.4 males. For every 100 females age 18 and over, there were 99.5 males.

The median income for a household in the town was $44,100, and the median income for a family was $49,353. Males had a median income of $33,269 versus $21,875 for females. The per capita income for the town was $20,381. About 3.8% of families and 5.6% of the population were below the poverty line, including 6.4% of those under age 18 and 7.0% of those age 65 or over.

== Notable people ==
- August Beversdorf (1864–1928), Wisconsin State Assembly and farmer, lived on a farm in the town; Beversdorf served as chairman of the Belle Plaine Town Board
