= Ernst A. Sonnemann =

American politician

Ernst A. Sonnemann (April 29, 1858 – November 15, 1927) was an American politician and was in the fishing business.

Born in Germany, Sonnemann emigrated with his parents to the United States in 1858 and settled in Sheboygan, Wisconsin. He was in the fishing business until his retirement. Sonnemann served on the Sheboygan Common Council and was a Republican. From 1925 until his death in 1927, Sonnemann served in the Wisconsin State Assembly. Sonnemann died in Chicago, Illinois after a short illness.
