= August Beversdorf =

American politician

August Beversdorf (September 22, 1864 – November 2, 1928) was an American farmer and businessman.

Born in Germany, Beversdorf emigrated with his parents to the United States and settled in Milwaukee, Wisconsin in 1867. In 1874, Beversdorf moved to the town of Richmond, Shawano County, Wisconsin and in 1885, bought a farm in the town of Belle Plaine in Shawano County. Beversdorf served as Belle Plaine town clerk and town chairman. He also served on the school board and was the clerk. Beversdorf served on the Shawano County asylum building committee and also was president of the Shawano County Agriculture Society. Beversdorf served in the Wisconsin State Assembly in 1923 and 1925 and was a Republican. Beversdorf died of cancer in a hospital in Green Bay, Wisconsin.
