= Peter Ankerson =

Peter Ankerson (January 21, 1874 – February 12, 1952) was an American farmer from Oconto, Wisconsin who served two terms as a Republican member of the Wisconsin State Assembly, as well as holding various local offices. He was active in the American Society of Equity.
