= William G. Kaufmann =

American businessman and politician

William G. Kaufmann (December 10, 1869 – January 16, 1947) was an American businessman and politician.

== Biography ==
Born in Sheboygan, Wisconsin, Kaufmann was in the meat retail business until retirement. He also worked in a logging camp and owned a fishing tug. Kaufmann served on the Sheboygan Fire and Police Commission and the Welfare Bureau. Kaufmann served in the Wisconsin State Assembly in 1921 and was a Republican. Kaufmann died in Sheboygan, Wisconsin.
