= Caledonia, Columbia County, Wisconsin =

Caledonia, Wisconsin
- Town
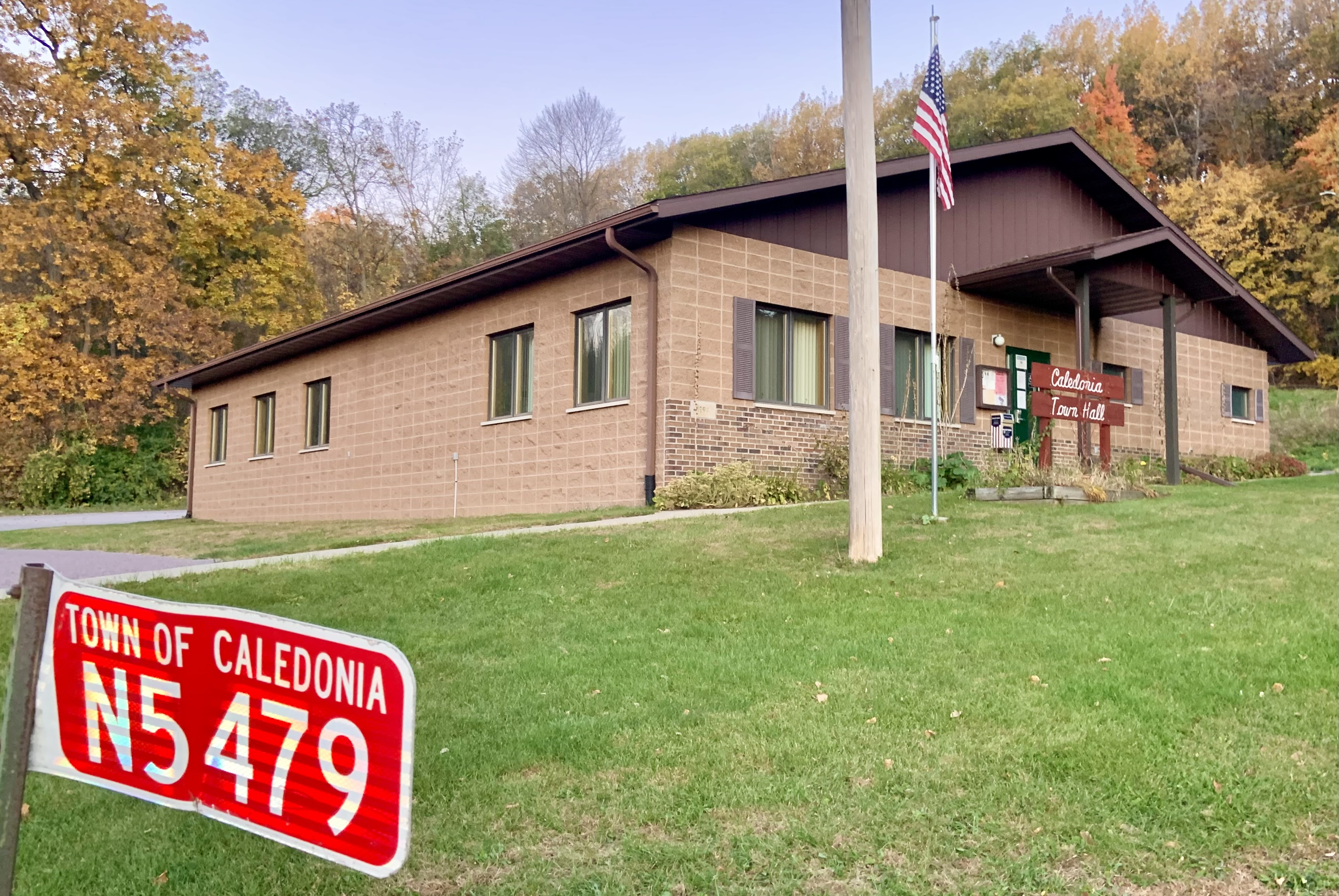
- Town hall

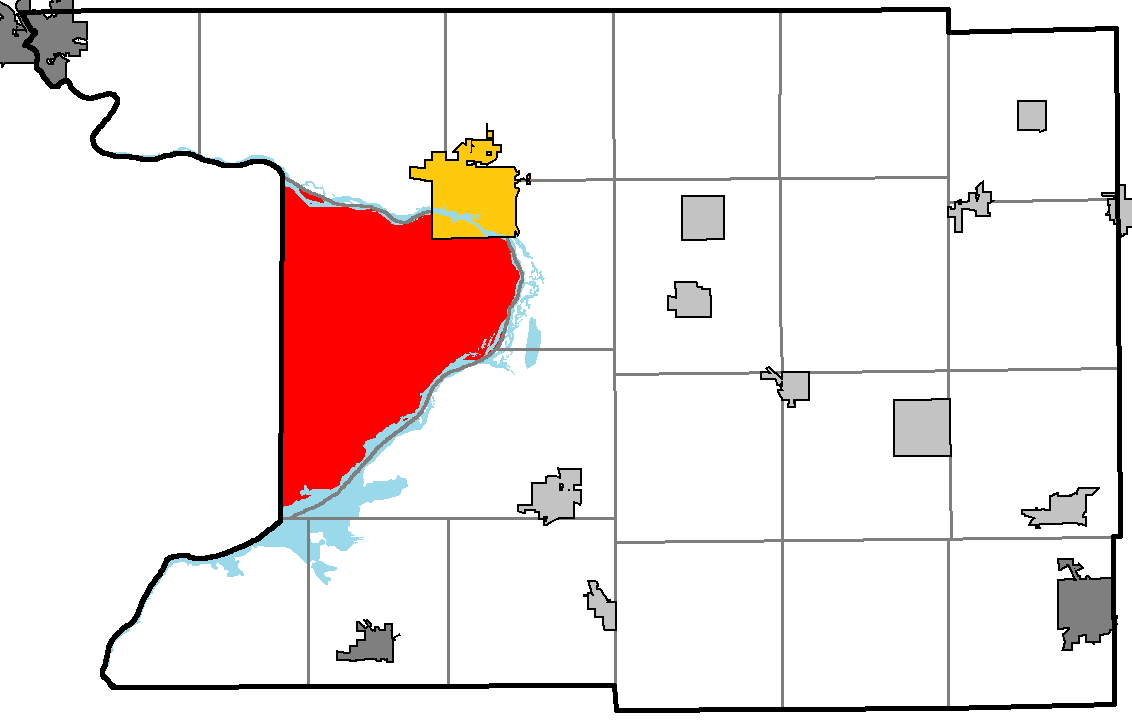
- Location of Caledonia, within Columbia County, Wisconsin

- Location of Columbia County, Wisconsin
- Coordinates: 43°29′1″N 89°30′51″W
- Country: United States
- State: Wisconsin
- County: Columbia

Area
  - Total: 63.6 sq mi (164.8 km^{2})
  - Land: 59.5 sq mi (154.1 km^{2})
  - Water: 4.1 sq mi (10.6 km^{2})
- Elevation: 1,073 ft (327 m)

Population (2020)
  - Total: 1,495
  - Density: 20/sq mi (7.6/km^{2})
- Time zone: UTC-6 (Central (CST))
  - Summer (DST): UTC-5 (CDT)
- FIPS code: 55-11900
- GNIS feature ID: 1582903
- Website: https://www.townofcaledonia.org

Caledonia is a town in Columbia County, Wisconsin, United States. The population was 1,495 at the 2020 census. The unincorporated community of Durwards Glen is located in the town.

== History ==
The town was named by Scottish settlers after the Latin name for Scotland.

== Geography ==
According to the United States Census Bureau, the town has a total area of 63.6 square miles (164.8 km^{2}), of which 59.5 square miles (154.2 km^{2}) is land and 4.1 square miles (10.6 km^{2}) (6.46%) is water.

The Wisconsin River bends over in Caledonia, then moves northward.

== Demographics ==
Historical population
Census	Pop.	Note	%±
1990	1,031		—
2000	1,171		13.6%
2010	1,378		17.7%
2020	1,495		8.5%

As of the census of 2000, there were 1,171 people, 451 households, and 343 families residing in the town. The population density was 19.7 people per square mile (7.6/km^{2}). There were 713 housing units at an average density of 12 per square mile (4.6/km^{2}). The racial makeup of the town was 98.63% White, 0.17% African American, 0.26% Native American, 0.17% Asian, 0.51% from other races, and 0.26% from two or more races. Hispanic or Latino of any race were 0.43% of the population.

There were 451 households, out of which 29.9% had children under the age of 18 living with them, 67.8% were married couples living together, 4.4% had a female householder with no husband present, and 23.9% were non-families. 17.3% of all households were made up of individuals, and 7.5% had someone living alone who was 65 years of age or older. The average household size was 2.6 and the average family size was 2.97.

In the town, the population was spread out, with 24.2% under the age of 18, 5.4% from 18 to 24, 27.7% from 25 to 44, 30% from 45 to 64, and 12.8% who were 65 years of age or older. The median age was 41 years. For every 100 females, there were 108.4 males. For every 100 females age 18 and over, there were 114.5 males.

The median income for a household in the town was $48,750, and the median income for a family was $56,042. Males had a median income of $35,156 versus $26,023 for females. The per capita income for the town was $23,278. About 4.4% of families and 6.7% of the population were below the poverty line, including 7.8% of those under age 18 and 15.8% of those age 65 or over.

== Historical sites ==
- Durward's Glen, historic place and retreatment center

== Notable people ==
- James S. Towers, farmer, businessman, and Wisconsin State Representative; born in the town
