= Barre, Wisconsin =

- Town
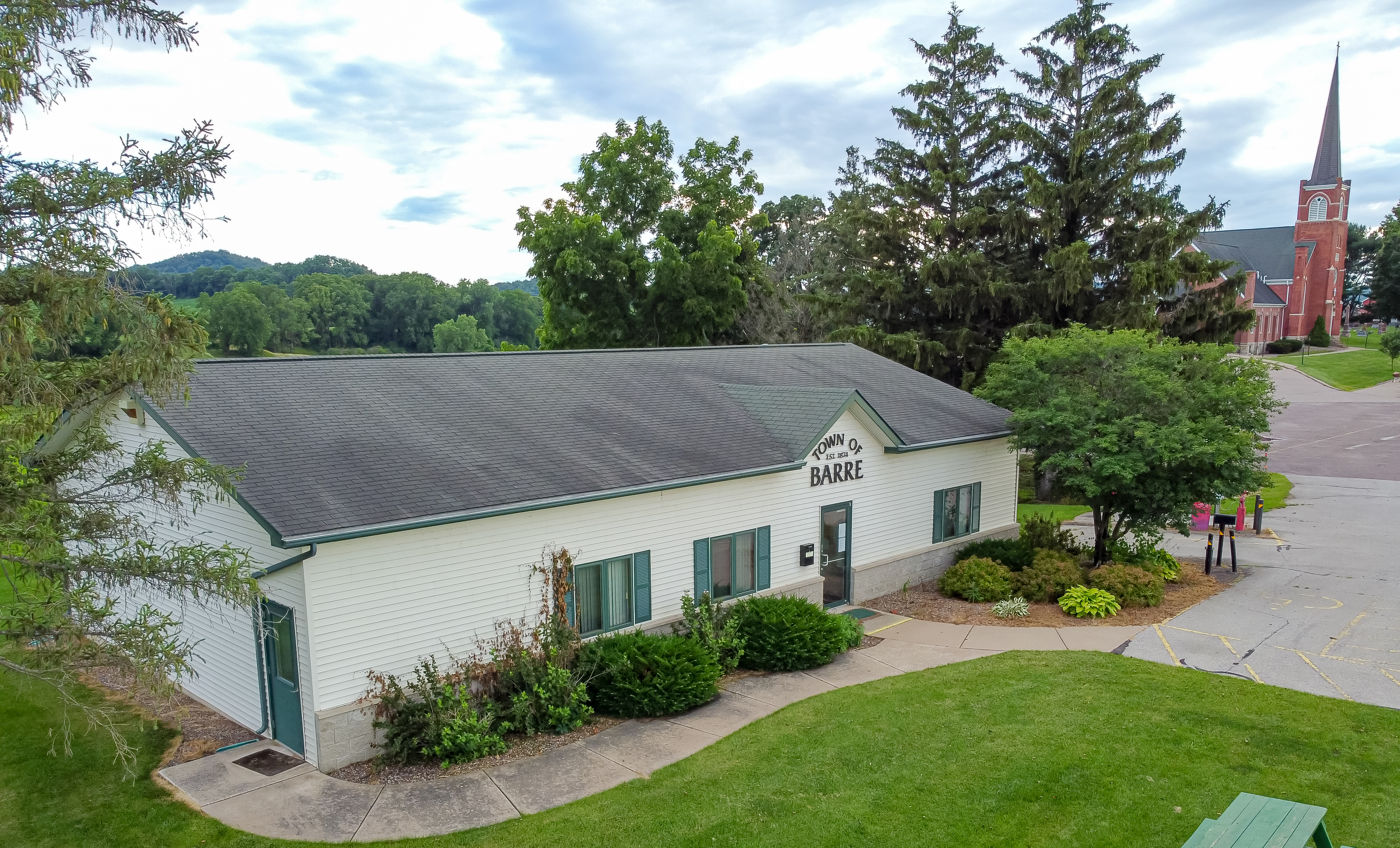
- Town hall

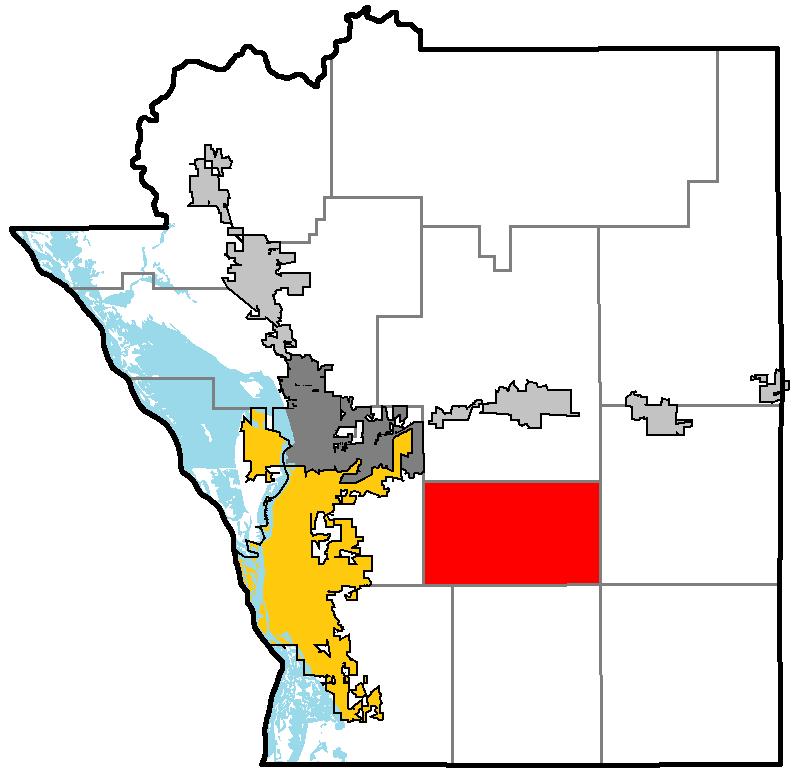
- Location of Barre, La Crosse County

- Location of La Crosse County, Wisconsin
- Coordinates: 43°50′15″N 91°6′11″W
- Country: United States
- State: Wisconsin
- County: La Crosse

Area
  - Total: 20.7 sq mi (53.5 km^{2})
  - Land: 20.7 sq mi (53.5 km^{2})
  - Water: 0 sq mi (0.0 km^{2})
- Elevation: 719 ft (219 m)

Population (2020)
  - Total: 1,267
  - Density: 61.3/sq mi (23.7/km^{2})
- Time zone: UTC-6 (Central (CST))
  - Summer (DST): UTC-5 (CDT)
- Area code: 608
- FIPS code: 55-04825
- GNIS feature ID: 1582754
- Website: https://www.townofbarre.org/

Barre (/ˈbæri/ BARR-ee) is a town in La Crosse County, Wisconsin, United States. The population was 1,267 at the 2020 census. It is part of the La Crosse, Wisconsin Metropolitan Statistical Area. The town hall is in the unincorporated community of Barre Mills.

== History ==
The town was most likely named for Barre, Vermont, as a portion of the area's early settlers came from that area.

== Geography ==
According to the United States Census Bureau, the town has a total area of 20.7 square miles (53.5 km^{2}), all land.

== Demographics ==
Historical population
Year	Pop.	±%
1990	908	—
2000	1,014	+11.7%
2010	1,234	+21.7%

As of the census of 2000, there were 1,014 people, 347 households, and 275 families residing in the town. The population density was 49.1 people per square mile (18.9/km^{2}). There were 354 housing units at an average density of 17.1 per square mile (6.6/km^{2}). The racial makeup of the town was 98.72% White, 0.39% African American, 0.50% Asian, 0.10% from other races, and 0.20% from two or more races. Hispanic or Latino of any race were 1.48% of the population.

There were 347 households, out of which 43.5% had children under the age of 18 living with them, 66.9% were married couples living together, 7.5% had a female householder with no husband present, and 20.7% were non-families. 17.0% of all households were made up of individuals, and 5.2% had someone living alone who was 65 years of age or older. The average household size was 2.92 and the average family size was 3.29.

In the town, the population was spread out, with 33.3% under the age of 18, 5.9% from 18 to 24, 30.9% from 25 to 44, 22.5% from 45 to 64, and 7.4% who were 65 years of age or older. The median age was 33 years. For every 100 females, there were 96.9 males. For every 100 females age 18 and over, there were 102.4 males.

The median income for a household in the town was $49,474, and the median income for a family was $53,250. Males had a median income of $34,519 versus $27,109 for females. The per capita income for the town was $21,609. About 2.0% of families and 2.9% of the population were below the poverty line, including 3.8% of those under age 18 and none of those age 65 or over.
