= Carol Kelso =

American politician (born 1945)

Brown County Executive
- In office April 15, 2003 – April 17, 2007
- Preceded by: Nancy Nusbaum
- Succeeded by: Tom Hinz

Member of the Wisconsin State Assembly from the 88th district
- In office January 2, 1995 – January 1, 2001
- Preceded by: Rosemary Hinkfuss
- Succeeded by: Judy Krawczyk

Personal details
- Born: May 26, 1945 (age 81) Fort Smith, Arkansas
- Party: Republican
- Children: 2
- Education: Iowa State University (BS)

Carol Kelso (born May 26, 1945) is an American politician who served as the Brown County Executive from 2003 to 2007, and as a Republican State Representative in the Wisconsin State Assembly from 1995 to 2001 from the 88th District.

== Early life and education ==
Kelso was born on May 26, 1945, in Fort Smith, Arkansas. She graduated from Iowa City High School in Iowa City, Iowa, and earned a bachelor's degree from Iowa State University.

== Career ==
After graduating from college, Kelso moved to Green Bay, Wisconsin. She served as the Vice President of Governmental Affairs of the Green Bay Area Chamber of Commerce.

== Political career ==
In 1994, Kelso ran for the State Assembly against Democratic State Representative Rosemary Hinkfuss. She defeated chiropractor Robert Menner in the Republican primary by a wide margin, and advanced to the general election against Hinkfuss. She defeated Hinkfuss by a wide margin, winning 56 percent of the vote.

She was unopposed for re-election in 1996, and in 1998 was challenged by Democrat Lori Nelson. She defeated Nelson with 57 percent of the vote. She declined to run for re-election to a fourth term in 2000.

Kelso was first elected to the Wisconsin State Assembly in 1994 and served until 2001. In 2003, Kelso ran for Brown County Executive. She ran against Hobart Village President Len Teresinski and trucker Roy Leyendecker. In the primary election, Kelso placed first with 58 percent of the vote, and advanced to the general election with Teresinski, who received 33 percent of the vote. She ultimately defeated Teresinski with 56 percent of the vote in the general election. Kelso declined to run for a second term as County Executive in 2007.
