= KHTL (disambiguation) =

KHTL is a radio station licensed to Fort Smith, Arkansas, United States.

KHTL may refer to:

- The ICAO airport code for Roscommon County–Blodgett Memorial Airport in Houghton Lake, Michigan, United States
- KVBM-LP, a low-power radio station (104.7 FM) licensed to serve Killeen, Texas, United States, which held the call sign KHTL-LP from 2006 to 2022
- KSNB-TV, a television station (channel 4) licensed to serve Superior, Nebraska, United States, which formerly used the call sign KHTL from 1965 to 1974
