= 2003 Brown County, Wisconsin Executive election =

- April 1, 2003

| Nominee | Carol Kelso | Len Teresinski |
| Party | Nonpartisan | Nonpartisan |
| Popular vote | 26,117 | 20,776 |
| Percentage | 55.59% | 44.22% |
County Executive before election
Nancy Nusbaum
Nonpartisan
Elected County Executive
Carol Kelso
Nonpartisan

The 2003 Brown County, Wisconsin Executive election took place on April 1, 2003, following a primary election on February 18, 2003. Incumbent County Executive Nancy Nusbaum declined to seek re-election to a third term. Three candidates ran to succeed her: former State Representative Carol Kelso, Hobart Village President Len Teresinski, and trucker Roy Leyendecker.

Kelso and Teresinski placed first and second in the primary election, with Kelso receiving 58 percent of the vote and Teresinski receiving 33 percent of the vote to Leyendecker's 8 percent. Though Kelso had an early financial lead after she transferred leftover funds from her state legislative campaign account, Teresinski made up ground as the campaign continued. The Green Bay Press-Gazette praised both candidates as "veteran politicians who are qualified for the post," but ultimately endorsed Teresinski, praising "his hands-on, common-sense and proactive approach to doing the public's business."

Ultimately, Kelso defeated Teresinski by a wide margin, winning 56 percent of the vote to Teresinski's 44 percent.

== Primary election ==
=== Candidates ===
- Carol Kelso, former State Representative
- Len Teresinski, Hobart Village President
- Roy Leyendecker, truck driver

==== Declined ====
- Nancy Nusbaum, incumbent County Executive

=== Results ===
Primary election results
| Party | Candidate | Votes | % |
|---|---|---|---|
| Nonpartisan | Carol Kelso | 10,652 | 58.43% |
| Nonpartisan | Len Teresinski | 5,986 | 32.83% |
| Nonpartisan | Roy Leyendecker | 1,445 | 7.93% |
| Write-in | | 148 | 0.81% |
| Total votes | | 18,231 | 100.00% |

== General election ==
=== Results ===
2003 Brown County Executive election
| Party | Candidate | Votes | % |
|---|---|---|---|
| Nonpartisan | Carol Kelso | 26,117 | 55.59% |
| Nonpartisan | Len Teresinski | 20,776 | 44.22% |
| Write-in | | 91 | 0.19% |
| Total votes | | 46,984 | 100.00% |
