= B98 =

B98 may refer to:

- B98, a postcode district in the B postcode area
- Sicilian Defence, Najdorf Variation, according to the list of chess openings
- Lola B98/10, a Le Mans Prototype
- B98 FM, the former name of Classic Hits FM, a radio station in Christchurch, New Zealand
- KZBB, a commercial radio station located in Poteau, Oklahoma, broadcasting to the Fort Smith, Arkansas, area
