= 2007 Brown County, Wisconsin Executive election =

- April 3, 2007

Nominee	Tom Hinz	Alan Lasee
Party	Nonpartisan	Nonpartisan
Popular vote	22,324	16,228
Percentage	57.84%	42.05%
County Executive before election
Carol Kelso
Nonpartisan
Elected County Executive
Tom Hinz
Nonpartisan

The 2007 Brown County, Wisconsin Executive election took place on April 3, 2007, following a primary election on February 20, 2007. Incumbent County Executive Carol Kelso did not run for a second term.

Three candidates ran to succeed her: former Sheriff Tom Hinz, State Senator Alan Lasee, and County Supervisor Patrick Evans. Though the race was formally nonpartisan, all three were Republicans, though Hinz, was a moderate Republican who endorsed former County Executive Nancy Nusbaum, a Democrat, in her 2006 bid for Congress and attracted support from local Democrats. In the primary election, Hinz placed first by a wide margin, winning 52 percent of the vote to Lasee's 27 percent and Evans's 21 percent.

In the general election, Lasee was endorsed by the Green Bay Press-Gazette, which praised him for his "straight-from-the-shoulder approach," "his proven commitment to both fiscal conservatism and property rights," and "proven ability to lead." The Press-Gazette noted that while Hinz "has proven his commitment" to the county, he "seemed content to do little to distinguish himself or show leadership" as a member of the County Board.

Hinz ultimately defeated Lasee in a landslide, winning the election with 58 percent of the vote.

== Primary election ==
=== Candidates ===
- Tom Hinz, former County Sheriff, former County Supervisor
- Alan Lasee, State Senator
- Patrick Evans, County Supervisor

==== Declined ====
- Carol Kelso, incumbent County Executive

=== Results ===
Primary election results
Party	Candidate	Votes	%
Nonpartisan	Tom Hinz	16,099	51.56%
Nonpartisan	Alan Lasee	8,505	27.24%
Nonpartisan	Patrick Evans	6,560	21.01%
Write-in		60	0.19%
Total votes		31,224	100.00%

== General election ==
=== Results ===
2007 Brown County Executive election
Party	Candidate	Votes	%
Nonpartisan	Tom Hinz	22,324	57.84%
Nonpartisan	Alan Lasee	16,228	42.05%
Write-in		43	0.11%
Total votes		38,595	100.00%
