= John R. Clarke (scientist) =

American scientist and underwater breathing apparatus authority

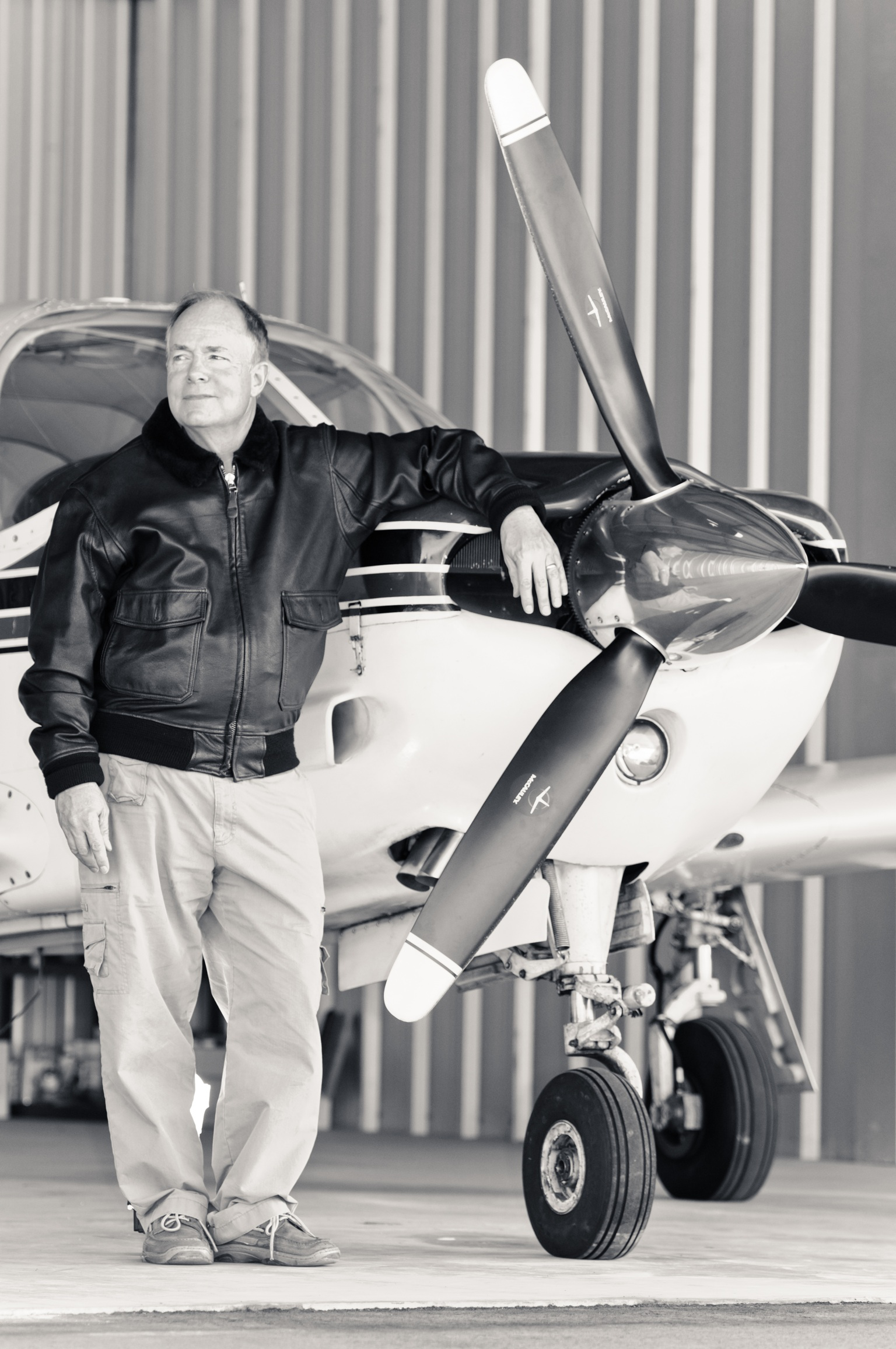
- Born: November 20, 1945 (age 80); Fort Smith, Arkansas, U.S.
- Allegiance: United States of America
- Branch: United States Army Reserve
- Service years: 11
- Rank: Captain
- Other work: United States Navy Experimental Diving Unit, University of Wollongong

John R. Clarke (born November 20, 1945) is an American scientist, private pilot and author. He is currently the Scientific Director at the United States Navy Experimental Diving Unit (NEDU). Clarke is recognized as a leading authority on underwater breathing apparatus engineering.

== Background ==
Clarke is the youngest of four children; his siblings are now deceased.

In 1969, Clarke volunteered for the United States Army Reserves. He was promoted to first lieutenant in 1974 then Captain in 1979. Clarke was honorably discharged in September 1980.

While at Georgia Tech in 1965, Clarke earned his scuba diving certification. He later participated in the NOAA/ Navy Scientist in the Sea program in 1972. He then went to the Navy Dive School in 1980. Clarke has remained an active scuba diver throughout his career.

Clarke received his private pilot license in 1974 and instrument rating in 1978. He currently owns a Piper Arrow and volunteers as a pilot for Angel Flight Southeast.

== Education ==
Clarke graduated from Shawnee Mission East High School in Prairie Village, Kansas in 1964. He received a BS degree in applied biology (1969), and an MS degree (1971) from Georgia Tech. His master's thesis studied the impact of pressure on Sacchromyces cerevisiae.

Physiology continued to drive Clarke and in 1976 he completed his Doctor of Philosophy by evaluating changes in physiology and pharmacology in bivalve molluscs hearts at Florida State University (FSU).

== Academic career ==
While completing his doctorate at FSU, Clarke worked as instructor and director of development in the Department of Biological and Physical Sciences at Thomas County Community College from 1975 to 1976.

Later in 1976, Clarke assumed a position as instructor and research associate in the Department of Physiology at Case Western Reserve University School of Medicine.

In 1977, Clarke left Case Western for a two–year Parker B. Francis Foundation Fellowship in the Department of Physiology at the University of Florida College of Medicine. The fellowship is named after the founder of Puritan Bennett and supports pulmonary research.

While working for the US Navy, Clarke accepted an appointment as an Adjunct Assistant Professor with Graduate Advisory Status for the Uniformed Services University of the Health Sciences from 1984 to 1990.

Clarke accepted an appointment as a Visiting Principal Fellow at the University of Wollongong in April 1998 to advise on a doctoral project. As of 2015, Clarke has served on five thesis committees from various institutions. Advisees have included Margie E. Bolton, Elizabeth Jane McCarthy, Rungchai Chaunchaiyakul, Erich C. Frandrup, and Adam J. Smith.

== US Navy career ==
In 1979, Clarke joined the team at the Naval Medical Research Institute (NMRI), now called the Naval Medical Research Center in Bethesda, Maryland. He was the head of the Respiratory Physiology Branch of the Physiology Division in the Diving Medicine Department. When Clarke left NMRI in 1991, he was the Diving Life Support Equipment Program Director GM-14.

Clarke led a team of researchers, scientists and engineers while at NMRI. The projects included work on diving equipment and physiology that included high frequency ventilation experiments.

From 1983 to 1991, Clark served as a National Research Council mentor for PhD research fellows. Clarke also mentored students from the Research Science Institute with some students winning the nationwide Westinghouse science competition.

Since 1991, Clarke has served as the Scientific Director GM-15 at the United States Navy Experimental Diving Unit (NEDU) in Panama City, Florida.

At NEDU, Clarke provides scientific oversight over engineering and physiological studies RDT&E for US Navy diving operations. He also serves as an advisor for Naval Sea Systems Command policy regarding technical challenges. This work includes equipment evaluations and physiology experimentation.

== Writing ==
Clarke's interest in writing began early. He published his first scientific article at age fifteen. While an undergraduate engineering student, he was paid for two of his articles in the Georgia Tech Engineer.

Clarke assisted his writing mentor, author Max McCoy, with a chapter taking place at NEDU in McCoy's 2004 book Moon Pool.

=== Middle Waters ===
In 2014, Clarke published his first novel, Middle Waters. It deals with two divers that set out to rescue aliens stranded on their spacecraft at the bottom of the sea. The government is aware of their presence and very interested in the alien technology. The divers soon find themselves caught between the alien civilization and their own government as they work to avert disaster while unknowingly competing with their friends in the recovery.

Award winning author and physician Rachel Scott suggested readers not "start this read at bedtime, if you plan to get any sleep!".

Max McCoy, author for the Indiana Jones franchise from 1995 on, claimed that Middle Waters was a book he had wished he'd written and would read over and over again. This was based partially on the fact that the main character is a diving scientist, a role that Clarke knows well and expertly conveys his knowledge to the reader.

== Professional societies and service ==
Clarke is a member of the American Academy of Underwater Sciences, the American Physiological Society, Sigma XI, and the Undersea and Hyperbaric Medical Society (UHMS). He served as the Chair of UHMS's Membership Committee from 1989 to 1991 and was elected as a member at large to their executive committee, serving in that role from 1998 to 2001.

Clarke also serves as a reviewer for research journals including the Journal of Applied Physiology, Ergonomics, Undersea Biomedical Research, and Annals of Biomedical Engineering.

Diving safety is a passion and Clarke volunteers as an advisor to the National Association of Underwater Instructors Rebreather Advisory Committee and Florida State University Diving Control Board. Clarke also lectures to the general diving public about issues impacting diver safety.

== Awards ==
In 1998, Clarke was selected as a Naval Sea Systems Command Spring 1998 trainee for "Leadership for a Democratic Society" course at the Office of Personnel Management's Federal Executive Institute in Charlottesville, Virginia.

Clarke won first place in the 2010 "best first line in a comic vampire novel" contest held by the Ozark Creative Writers' Conference in Eureka Springs, Arkansas.

== Bibliography ==
=== Book chapters ===
- Morrison JB, Clarke JR (2008). "Diving Physiology: free diving, breathing apparatus, saturation diving". In: Eds., NAS Taylor, H Groeller, Physiological Bases of Human Performance During Work and Exercise.
- Clarke JR (2003). "Future of US Navy Diving". In: Naval Forces Under the Sea – A Look Back, A Look Ahead: 3–90 to 3–94.
- Clarke JR, Flook V (1999). "Respiratory Function at Depth". In: The Lung at Depth, ed. CEG Lundgren and J Miller. In Series, Lung Biology in Health and Disease, ed. Claude Enfant. New York, Marcel Dekker: 1–71.
- Clarke JR (1999). "Underwater Breathing Apparatus". In: The Lung at Depth, ed. CEG Lundgren and J Miller. In Series, Lung Biology in Health and Disease, ed. Claude Enfant. New York, Marcel Dekker: 429–527.
- Clarke JR (1996). "Measurement of average resistance in underwater breathing apparatus". In: Book III, Drilling & Production Economics: 227–230.
- Clarke JR (1992). "Diver tolerance to respiratory loading during wet and dry dives from 0 to 450 msw". In: Lung Physiology and Divers' Breathing Apparatus. Ed. V. Flook and A.O. Brubakk., BPCC-AUD, Aberdeen: 33–40.
- Clarke JR (1992). "Impedance and power measurements in the testing of closed circuit UBA". In: Lung Physiology and Divers' Breathing Apparatus. Ed. V. Flook and A.O. Brubakk., BPCC-AUD, Aberdeen: 85–93.
- Clarke JR, Joye D (1989). "Formal descriptions of elastic loads encountered in the use of underwater breathing systems". In: Lundgren and Warkander, Eds. UHMS Workshop, Physiological and Human Engineering Aspects of Underwater Breathing Apparatus, Buffalo, NY, Undersea and Hyperbaric Medical Society, Bethesda: 59–76.
- Clarke JR, Survanshi S, Thalmann ED, Flynn ET (1989). "Limits for mouth pressure in underwater breathing apparatus (UBA)". In: Eds. Lundgren and Warkander, Physiological and Human Engineering Aspects of Underwater Breathing Apparatus. Undersea and Hyperbaric Medical Society, Inc. Bethesda, MD.
- Casey L, Clarke JR, Fletcher J, Ramwell P (1982). "Cardiovascular, Respiratory, and Hematologic Effects of Leukotriene D4 in Primates". In: Samuelsson and Paoletti, Eds. Advances in Prostaglandin, Thromboxane, and Leukotrien Research Series, Vol. 9, Leukotrienes and Other Lipoxygenase Products. Raven Press, New York. 9: 201–10. PMID 6211952.

=== Refereed Journals ===
- O'Connor P, Hyde D, Clarke J (2009). "Torso heating of divers in cold water". Aviation, Space, and Environmental Medicine. 80 (7): 603–9. doi:10.3357/asem.2488.2009. hdl:10379/2574. PMID 19601501. S2CID 8601644.
- Chaunchaiyakul R, Groeller H, Clarke JR, Taylor NA (2004). "The impact of aging and habitual physical activity on static respiratory work at rest and during exercise". American Journal of Physiology. Lung Cellular and Molecular Physiology. 287 (6): L1098–106. doi:10.1152/ajplung.00399.2003. PMID 15246978. S2CID 1448707.
- Nuckols ML, Clarke JR, Marr WJ (1999). "Assessment of oxygen levels in alternative designs of semiclosed underwater breathing apparatus". Life Support & Biosphere Science: International Journal of Earth Space. 6 (3): 239–49. PMID 11542685.
- Nuckols ML, Clarke J, Grupe C (1998). "Maintaining safe oxygen levels in semiclosed underwater breathing apparatus". Life Support & Biosphere Science: International Journal of Earth Space. 5 (1): 87–95. PMID 11540469.
- Clarke JR (1996). "A priori models in the testing of diving life support equipment". Life Support & Biosphere Science: International Journal of Earth Space. 2 (3–4): 125–31. PMID 11538561.
- Joye DD, Clarke JR, Carlson NA, Thalmann ED (1994). "Characterization and measurement of elastance with application to underwater breathing apparatus". Undersea & Hyperbaric Medicine. 21 (1): 53–65. PMID 8180567. Archived from the original on August 11, 2011.
- Taylor NA, Clarke JR (1993). "Pulmonary function hysteresis during compression to, and decompression from 31.3 ATA". Acta Physiologica Scandinavica. 148 (4): 371–8. doi:10.1111/j.1748-1716.1993.tb09572.x. PMID 8213192.
- Clarke JR, Homer LD, Flynn ET, Bradley ME (1987). "Tracheal pressure and impedance as determinants of gas exchange during high frequency ventilation" (PDF). Respiration Physiology. 68 (1): 121–36. doi:10.1016/0034-5687(87)90081-8. PMID 3602610. Archived from the original on September 24, 2017.
- Clarke JR, Jaeger MJ, Zumrick JL, O'Bryan R, Spaur WH (1982). "Respiratory resistance from 1 to 46 ATA measured with the interrupter technique". Journal of Applied Physiology: Respiratory, Environmental and Exercise Physiology. 52 (3): 549–55. doi:10.1152/jappl.1982.52.3.549. PMID 6461620.
- Clarke JR, Rogers J (1982). "Barotrauma susceptibility in hamster lungs following elastase exposure". Undersea Biomedical Research. 9 (1): 21–35. PMID 6920206.
- Clarke JR (1978). "The effect of high pressure on the rhythmicity of bivalve hearts". Comp. Biochem. Physiol. 60A (2): 151–160. doi:10.1016/0300-9629(78)90221-9.
- Clarke JR (1978). "The response of an intertidal bivalve heart to hypo osmotic and ionic stress at high pressure". Comp. Biochem. Physiol. 61A: 35–42. doi:10.1016/0300-9629(78)90273-6.
- Clarke JR (1977). "Fluidity-induced changes in diffusion through membranes: a predictive model". Journal of Theoretical Biology. 68 (2): 293–8. Bibcode:1977JThBi..68..293C. doi:10.1016/0022-5193(77)90166-7. PMID 926799.
- Clarke JR (1960). "Light spectra and glucose relationships in plants". Proceedings of the Kansas Academy of Science.

=== Non-Refereed Journals and Reports ===
- Clarke JR, Ferris V (2012). "The Use of One-Sample Prediction Intervals for Estimating CO2 Scrubber Canister Durations". Navy Experimental Diving Unit Technical Report 12-03.
- Clarke JR (2007). "Review of MARCORSYSCOM operational requirements for Enhanced Underwater Breathing Apparatus (EUBA) using simulation software". Navy Experimental Diving Unit Technical Report 07-11 (Classified).
- Clarke JR, O'Connor PE (2004). "Testing of a prototype Special Operations gas mask". Navy Experimental Diving Unit Technical Report 04-27(Classified).
- Clarke JR, Schultz B, Crepeau L, Lowe M (2003). "Evaluating the effects of high-dose melatonin on mental and somatic status of normal subjects". Navy Experimental Diving Unit Technical Report 03-20.
- Clarke JR (2003). "Gas flows supporting umbilical diving – requirements and measurements". Navy Experimental Diving Unit Technical Report 03-09.
- Warkander DE, Clarke JR (2002). "Method for estimating the remaining capacity of the carbon dioxide scrubber in the Hyperbaric Oxygen Treatment Pack". Navy Experimental Diving Unit Technical Report 02-13.
- Clarke JR (2002). "The analysis of sodalime granule size distributions". Navy Experimental Diving Unit Technical Report 02-08.
- Naggiar ER, Sanchack KE, Clarke JR (2002). "Comparison of Draeger Divesorb Pro to Sofnolime 812 in the MK 25 Mod 2 SEAL Delivery Vehicle, MK 16 Mod 0, and Viper VSW canisters". Navy Experimental Diving Unit Technical Report 02-02 (Classified).
- Clarke JR (2002). "Evaluation of the pre-production model self-contained operational utility tank (SCOUT) high pressure air system. Navy Experimental Diving Unit Technical Report 02-01 (Classified)".
- Clarke JR (2001). "Evaluation of the Self-Contained Operational Utility Tank (SCOUT) high pressure air system". Navy Experimental Diving Unit Technical Report 8-01 (Classified).
- Clarke JR (1999). "Statistically Based CO2 Canister Duration Limits for Closed-Circuit Underwater Breathing Apparatus". Navy Experimental Diving Unit Technical Report 2-99.
- Crepeau L, Clarke JR (1998). "Recommended canister limits for the Draeger LAR V/MK 25 UBA using 408 L-grade and 812 D-grade Sofnolime". Navy Experimental Diving Unit Technical Report 9-97 (Classified).
- Clarke JR, Thompson LD, Godfrey RJ (1998). "Lot variability of Sofnolime 408 carbon dioxide absorbent when tested in the cold". Navy Experimental Diving Unit Technical Report 1-98.
- Morgan KR, Cowgill DE, Clarke JR (1997). "MK 24 Full face mask diaphragm retainer shroud modification with the EBS I and II". Navy Experimental Diving Unit Technical Report 11-97.
- Crepeau L, Clarke JR (1997). "CBR protective respirator-induced performance decrements during Navy-relevant operational tasks". Navy Experimental Diving Unit Technical Report 2-97 (Classified).
- Clarke JR, Maurer J, Southerland DE, Junker DL (1997). "Evaluation of the Diving Systems International EXO-26 BR full face mask". Navy Experimental Diving Unit Technical Report 1-97 (Classified).
- Clarke JR, Maurer J, Junker DL (1996). "Evaluation of the SIVA 55 (S-55) semi-closed underwater breathing apparatus". Navy Experimental Diving Unit Technical Report 14-96 (Classified).
- Clarke JR, Junker DL, Rainone M (1996). "Evaluation of the US Divers Nordic SCUBA regulator for use in cold water". Navy Experimental Diving Unit Technical Report 11-96.
- Clarke JR, Knafelc M, Junker DL, Allain SC (1996). "Evaluation of the Fullerton Sherwood S-24 (SIVA) semi-closed underwater breathing apparatus". Navy Experimental Diving Unit Technical Report 9-96 (Classified).
- Clarke JR, Knafelc M, Junker DL, Allain SC (1996). "Evaluation of the Draeger LAR V Nitrox (LAR 7) semi-closed underwater breathing apparatus". Navy Experimental Diving Unit Technical Report 8-96 (Classified).
- Clarke JR, Knafelc M, Junker DL, Allain SC (1996). "Evaluation of the Draeger Extreme semi-closed underwater breathing apparatus". Navy Experimental Diving Unit Technical Report 7-96 (Classified).
- Clarke JR, Junker DL, Allain SC (1996). "Evaluation of the US Divers DC-55 semi-closed underwater breathing apparatus". Navy Experimental Diving Unit Technical Report 5-96 (Classified).
- Clarke JR, Rainone M (1996). "Evaluation of the Scuba Pro MK 10 and MK 20 SCUBA regulators for use in cold water". Navy Experimental Diving Unit Technical Report 1-96.
- Clarke JR, Rainone M (1995). "Evaluation of the Poseidon Odin SCUBA regulator for use in cold water". Navy Experimental Diving Unit Technical Report 14-95.
- Baiss D, Southerland DG, Clarke JR (1995). "MK 3 Mod 0 Lightweight Dive System (LWDS) air flow capacity". Navy Experimental Diving Unit Technical Report 12-95 (Classified).
- Clarke JR, Rainone M (1995). "Evaluation of Sherwood SCUBA regulators for use in cold water". Navy Experimental Diving Unit Technical Report 9-95.
- Clarke JR (1994). "US Navy Unmanned Test Methods and Performance Goals for Underwater Breathing Apparatus". Navy Experimental Diving Unit Technical Manual 01-94.
- Clarke JR, Russell K, Crepeau L (1993). "MK 16 canister limits for SDV operations". Navy Experimental Diving Unit Report 2-93.
- Clarke JR (1989). "Formulation of elastic loading parameters for studies of closed-circuit underwater breathing systems". Navy Medical Research Institute Technical Report 89-89, Bethesda.
- Clarke JR, Homer LD, Flynn ET (1983). "Efficiency of high frequency ventilation as determined by nitrogen washouts: a model study". Navy Medical Research Institute Technical Report 83–09.
- Clarke JR, Mints Jr WE, Bradley ME (1981). "An improved method of compensating whole body plethysmographs". Navy Medical Research Institute Report 81-10.
- Clarke JR (1979). "Smoking and Diving". Public Information Brochure for Florida Sea Grant. MAFS 7.
- Clarke JR (1968). "Holography the crystal ball of sound". Georgia Tech Engineer. 25 (4): 26–29.
- Clarke JR (1967). "The Depth Challenger glass spheres for use in research submersibles". Georgia Tech Engineer. 29 (6): 12–17.

=== Patents ===
- 1994 US 5315988 "Reactive, closed-circuit underwater breathing apparatus"
- 1996 US 5485834 "Manually tunable, closed-circuit underwater breathing apparatus"
