= KISR =

- Fort Smith, Arkansas; United States
- Frequency: 950 kHz
- Branding: KISR 93 (pronounced as "Kisser 93")

Programming
- Format: Contemporary hit radio

Ownership
- Owner: Fred H. Baker, Jr.; (Star 92, Co.)
- Sister stations: KREU

History
- First air date: February 23, 1947
- Call sign meaning: "Kisser"

Technical information
- Licensing authority: FCC
- Facility ID: 22413
- Class: B
- Power: 1,000 watts (day); 500 watts (night)
- Transmitter coordinates: 35°25′58″N 94°28′13″W
- Translators: 93.1 K226BS (Fort Smith); 104.9 K285AY (Havana)

Links
- Public license information: Public file; LMS
- Webcast: Listen live
- Website: outlaw931.com

KISR (950 AM) is a radio station broadcasting a country music format. Licensed to Fort Smith, Arkansas, United States, it serves the Fort Smith area. The station is owned by Fred H. Baker, Jr., through licensee Star 92, Co.

== History ==
This station went on the air on February 23, 1947, as KFSA ("Know Fort Smith, Arkansas"). It later became an affiliate with ABC Radio on March 3.

In August 1981, the station was sold to Stereo 93, Inc., which owns KISR.

On January 11, 2021, KFSA changed its format from country to conservative talk.

On April 16, 2022, KFSA changed its format back to country branded as "Outlaw 93.1". This format moved to the HD2 subchannel of then-KISR and translator K231BS to make way for KISR's contemporary hit radio format, which moved here when the KISR facility was sold to Pearson Broadcasting in 2026.
