= KMAG (FM) =

Coordinates: 35.0740°N 94.6802°W

- Fort Smith, Arkansas; United States
- Broadcast area: Fort Smith, Arkansas
- Frequency: 99.1 MHz
- Branding: KMAG 99.1

Programming
- Format: Country
- Affiliations: Premiere Networks

Ownership
- Owner: iHeartMedia, Inc.; (iHM Licenses, LLC)
- Sister stations: KKBD, KWHN, KZBB

History
- First air date: 1964
- Call sign meaning: Magazine Mountain

Technical information
- Licensing authority: FCC
- Facility ID: 22098
- Class: C
- ERP: 94,000 watts
- HAAT: 600 meters (2,000 ft)

Links
- Public license information: Public file; LMS
- Webcast: Listen live (via iHeartRadio)
- Website: kmag991.iheart.com

KMAG (99.1 FM) is a commercial radio station located in Fort Smith, Arkansas. KMAG airs a country format.

The station's "KMAG" call letters were derived from Magazine Mountain, the former site of the station's transmitter.
