= Roger Lee Steele =

American artist (1945–2012)

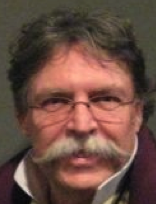
- Born: Roger Lee Steele; 12 June 1945; Fort Smith, Arkansas
- Died: 4 August 2012 (aged 67); Beaufort, South Carolina
- Known for: Printmaker
- Notable work: Moronbu II, Kaminari Hue in Rain

Roger Lee Steele (12 June 1945 – 4 August 2012). Raised in Wichita Falls, Texas, Steele was an American-born graphic artist/printmaker living in South Carolina best known for his lithography, an artistic process also known as relief printing. He was a printmaker specializing in the color-blend or split fountain technique, often incorporating traditional chine-collé gold leaf techniques in his work. His abstract color graphics are frequently suggestive of an artistic link between mid-late Japanese motifs and the modern world.

== Biography ==
As an exchange student at Tokyo's Sophia University, Steele studied graphic art and painting and was strongly attracted to the culture and artistic aesthetic of the late Edo period and early Meiji period. His studies at Sophia made a lasting impression and continued to inform his work throughout his life. Steele completed his studies at Texas Christian University, graduating in 1974 with a Master's degree in Fine Arts.

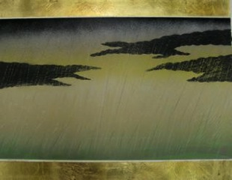
"Kaminari Hue in Rain", gold leaf chine-collé treatment

Eventually, his style came to strongly feature late-period Japanese elements and techniques, evoking the “floating world” of the 18th and 19th centuries. His highly recognizable, occasionally “militaristic” approach was developed over decades to its current status as a point of reference for the genre. His earliest works featured landscape vistas fused with broadly martial representations, alternatively peaceful, then vaguely soldierly and even bellicose in composition.

Throughout his career, Steele played an active role in art education both as an educator and as a lecturer and curator, maintaining affiliations with the University of South Carolina, the Southern Graphics Council, American Print Alliance, and the World Print Council. He was a significant contributor to the Southern Graphics Council International, with service to that organization spanning nearly forty years. He held nearly every position on the board and continued to be artistically active up to his death in 2012. His works are to be found in a number of permanent museum and corporate collections as well as in private hands. His life and art were celebrated from March–April 2013 in an exhibition of his whimsical Valentine Collection at THE Fine Art Gallery, Milwaukee, Wisconsin. Steele's contributions to the educational community of his hometown of Beaufort, South Carolina were the subject of a posthumous tribute in the Hilton Head Island News, February 2–8, 2017.

== Affiliations ==
- Southern Graphics Council: Treasurer (1978-1980), SC Representative at Large (2002-2004), Vice President for Internal Affairs (2004-2006), Curator of the Traveling Exhibition (2006-2009)
- American Print Alliance
- World Print Council
- Southeastern College Art Conference
- South Carolina Arts Commission

== Exhibitions ==
- Prints by Robert Steele-Special Exhibition, The Fine Art Gallery LLC, Milwaukee, WI, March–April 2013
- Southern Graphics Council Traveling Exhibition 2006-2009
- Corcoran Museum School of Art, Washington, DC 2005
- Mason Gross School of the Arts, Rutgers, New Brunswick, NJ 2004
- Expect the Unexpected: Charles Street Gallery, Dec, 2003. Beaufort, SC
- Revolutions and Representation, Boston University, Boston, Ma 2003
- Steele on Paper: Charles Street Gallery, Dec, 2002, Beaufort, SC
- The History and Techniques of Printmaking (Traveling exhibition) McMaster Gallery, USC, Columbia, SC 2002
- Fresh Paint: USCB, May, 2002
- Print Gumbo, New Orleans, La 2002
- Border Crossings, University of Texas, Austin, 2001
- Edo Vision: Converse College, Spartanburg, SC, May, 1999
- Edo Vision: USCB, Jan, 1999
- Southern Graphics Council Traveling Show: 1998-2001
- Exchange Portfolio Exhibition, University of Tennessee, Knoxville, 1995
- Portfolio Exhibition, Texas Christian University, Fort Worth, 1994
- Emergency Art Call: Beaufort Memorial Hospital, 1992
- Piccolo Spoleto: Charleston, SC, 1991
- National Works on Paper: University of Mississippi, 1990
- Gibbes Art Museum, Charleston, SC, 1989
- Columbia College, Columbia, SC, 1988
- 16 South Carolina Printmakers, Furman University, Greenville, SC, 1988
- Invitational: Century Center, Charlotte, NC, 1987
- Colorblend USA: Texas Tech, Lubbock, Texas, 1987
- Beaufort Art Association Spring show, Beaufort, SC, 1985
- Hyde-Malone Corporation Traveling Exhibition, 1985-1986
- NCNB Corporation Traveling Exhibition, 1985-1987
- 2nd Regional Lauren Rogers Library and Museum of Art Competition, Laurel, Mississippi, 1984
- National Print Competition 79: Edinboro, State College, Pa.
- Spokane National 1979 Works on/with PAPER
- A3A Gallery, Savannah, Ga., 1979
- Wash Art 79, 4th International Art Fair, Washington, DC
- Comparisons and Contrasts 1980-1982: Exchange exhibition between Printmakers of the Soviet Union and Southern US Juror: Fritz Eichenberg
- Artistic Sass: Hilton Head Island, SC, 1981
- Colorprint USA: Texas Tech, Lubbock, Texas, 1983
- Kate Skipworth Museum, University of Mississippi, 1979
- McKissick Museum, USC, Columbia, SC, 1978
- Stockton National 1978: Stockton, Ca. Juror: Henry Hopkins
- Colorprint USA: Texas Tech, Lubbock, Texas, 1978 Juror: Warrington Colescott
- Works of Art on Paper/Clay: Memphis State University, 1978 Juror: Garo Antreasian
- National Juried ColorBlend Exhibition: Georgia Southern College, Statesboro, Ga., 1978 Jurors: Dr. Tom Dewey and Bernard E. Solomon
- Charlotte Printmakers Society 2nd Annual Print Exhibition: Charlotte, NC, 1978 Juror: Robert A. Nelson
- Image South Gallery, Atlanta, Ga., 1977
- Foxgrape Gallery, Hilton Head Island, SC, 1977
- Armstrong College, Savannah, Ga., 1977
- Nine South Carolina Printmakers: The Gallery, Spartanburg, SC, 1976
- Western Kentucky University, Bowling Green, Ky., 1976
- Georgia College, Milledgeville, Ga., 1976
- Stetson University, DeLand, Fla., 1975
- University of Northern Iowa, Cedar Falls, Ia., 1975
- Minot State College, Minot, ND, 1975
- Kirkwood Community College, Cedar Rapids, Ia., 1975
- South Carolina Arts Commission Invitational: Clemson, SC, 1975 Juror: Jack Perlmutter
- USCB, Beaufort, SC, 1975
- Texas College Art Show: Mountain View College, Dallas, Tx. 1974 Juror: Edmund Burke Feldman
- Young Texas Printmakers: Dallas, Tx., 1974
- TCU Art Exhibition, Fort Worth, Tx., 1974 Juror: William Wiman
- Texas Fine Arts Association Regional Show: Fort Worth, Tx, 1974 Juror: Chris Goble
- Tyler Museum of Fine Art, Tyler, Tx., 1974
- 19th National Invitational Print Exhibition: Brooklyn Museum, NY, 1974
- Wichita Falls Museum and Art Center, Wichita Falls, Tx, 1974
- Mount Holyoke College National Prints and Drawings Competition: South Hadley, Ma, 1974 Jurors: Alfred Leslie and Robert Mallary
- Purdue University, West LaFayette, In., 1974
- DePauw University, Greencastle, In., 1974
