= KHTL =

- Fort Smith, Arkansas; United States
- Broadcast area: Western Arkansas and Eastern Oklahoma (Fort Smith/Fayetteville)
- Frequency: 93.7 MHz (HD Radio)
- Branding: ESPN Arkansas

Programming
- Language: English
- Format: Sports radio
- Subchannels: HD2: Outlaw 94.1 (Country); HD3: 101.9 The River (Classic rock); HD4: 105.5 The Rooster (Classic country)

Ownership
- Owner: Stereo 93, Inc.

History
- First air date: August 16, 1971
- Former call signs: KISR (1971–2026); KFSA (May–June 2026)
- Call sign meaning: Hit That Line, the name of ESPN Arkansas's website and in turn a passage from the University of Arkansas fight song "Arkansas Fight"

Technical information
- Licensing authority: FCC
- Facility ID: 63336
- Class: C
- ERP: 88,000 watts
- HAAT: 316 meters (1,037 ft)
- Transmitter coordinates: 35°42′36″N 94°8′16.0″W
- Translator: 96.1 K241CE (Fayetteville) see below for HD Radio subchannel translators

Links
- Public license information: Public file; LMS
- Website: hitthatline.com; HD2: www.rock941.com; HD3: www.theriver1019.com; HD4: www.therooster1055.com

KHTL (93.7 MHz) is a radio station licensed to Fort Smith, Arkansas, United States. It is part of the ESPN Arkansas sports radio network owned by Pearson Broadcasting.

== History ==
KISR was started in 1971, by Fred Baker, Jr., Bernie Baker, and Ed Hopkins III. Its original offices, studio, and transmitter were in the front three rooms of Fred and Bernie Baker's home at 605 North Greenwood in Fort Smith, and the antenna was hung on a utility pole in the backyard. In the market's first Arbitron ratings, KISR had a 32-share compared to the next closest station's 13 share. The transmitter is located in Young Mountain, north of Van Buren, Arkansas. Its studios and offices are in Central Mall in Fort Smith.

On April 10, 2026, after a $1.235 million sale filing of Fred Baker’s Stereo 93 Inc. to Pearson Broadcasting, it was announced that KISR would drop its CHR format and flip to ESPN Radio as part of the statewide ESPN Arkansas network, with the former CHR format moving to 950 kHz. KISR founder Fred Baker noted that the station had been intended to be local, not regional, but a 2024 tower site change had given the station regional coverage including Fayetteville. The move expands Pearson's ESPN coverage throughout the entirety of Northwest Arkansas and Western Arkansas and into much of Eastern Oklahoma, bringing clear signal coverage of Arkansas Razorbacks games and ESPN programming. The KISR call sign was moved to the AM facility on May 26, 2026, and this station became KFSA. The call sign was changed again on June 27, 2026, to KHTL.

== KISR-HD2 ==
On September 20, 2018, KISR launched an active rock format on its HD2 subchannel, branded as "Rock 94.1" (simulcast on translator K231BS Fort Smith). The country format that had been on 950 moved to the HD2 subchannel ahead of the sale of 93.7 to Pearson.

== KISR-HD3 ==
On September 17, 2018 (after stunting with Free's "All Right Now"), KISR launched a classic rock format on its HD3 subchannel, branded as "101.9 The River" (simulcast on translator K270BR 101.9 FM Fort Smith). In December '23, the station became an affiliate of the syndicated Pink Floyd program "Floydian Slip".

== Translators ==
Call sign	Frequency	City of license	FID	ERP (W)	Class	FCC info	Notes
K241CE	96.1 FM	Fayetteville, Arkansas	22394	62	D	LMS	Relays KISR FM/HD1
K231BS	94.1 FM	Fort Smith, Arkansas	22386	250	D	LMS	Relays KISR-HD2
K270BR	101.9 FM	Fort Smith, Arkansas	22418	250	D	LMS	Relays KISR-HD3
K288GO	105.5 FM	Fort Smith, Arkansas	22385	243	D	LMS	Relays KISR-HD4
