= Fort Smith, Arkansas =

- City
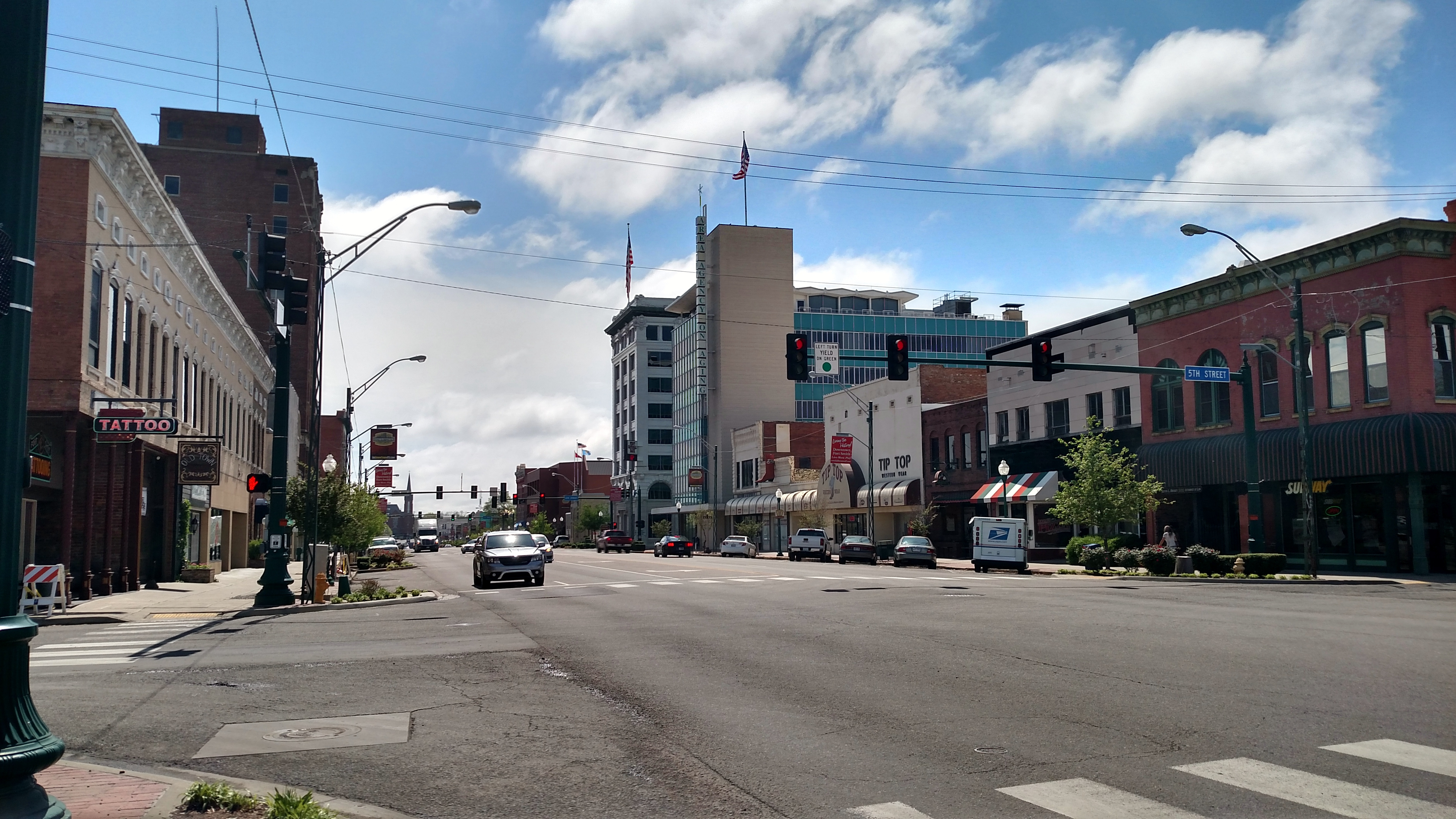
- Downtown Fort Smith

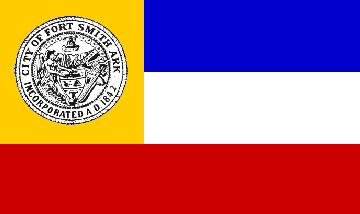
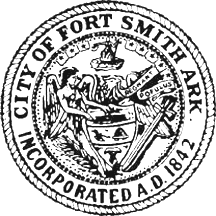
- Flag Seal
- Interactive map of Fort Smith, Arkansas
- Location within Arkansas Location within the United States
- Coordinates: 35°22′47″N 94°22′55″W
- Country: United States
- State: Arkansas
- County: Sebastian
- Founded: 1817
- Incorporated: December 24, 1842

Government
  - Mayor: George B. McGill (D)

Area
  - City: 68.23 sq mi (176.72 km^{2})
  - Land: 63.99 sq mi (165.74 km^{2})
  - Water: 4.24 sq mi (10.98 km^{2})
- Elevation: 463 ft (141 m)

Population (2020)
  - City: 89,142
  - Estimate (2025): 90,855 ▲
  - Density: 1,393.0/sq mi (537.83/km^{2})
  - Urban: 122,947 (US: 257th)
  - Metro: 279,974 (US: 165th)

GDP
  - Metro: $12.024 billion (2022)
- Time zone: UTC−6 (CST)
  - Summer (DST): UTC−5 (CDT)
- ZIP codes: 72901-72906, 72908, 72913-72914, 72916-72919
- Area code: 479
- FIPS code: 05-24550
- GNIS feature ID: 2403647
- Interstate Highways: I-40, I-49, I-540
- Other major highways: US 64, US 71, US 271
- Website: fortsmithar.gov

Fort Smith is the third-most populous city in Arkansas, United States, and one of the two county seats of Sebastian County. As of the 2020 census, the population was 89,142. It is the principal city of the Fort Smith, Arkansas–Oklahoma Metropolitan Statistical Area, a region of 298,592 residents that encompasses the Arkansas counties of Crawford, Franklin, and Sebastian, and the Oklahoma counties of LeFlore and Sequoyah.

Fort Smith lies on the Arkansas–Oklahoma state border, situated in the Arkansas Valley at the confluence of the Arkansas and Poteau rivers, also known as Belle Point. Fort Smith was established as a western frontier military post in 1817, when it was also a center of fur trading. The city developed there. Strategically located between the Ozarks to the north and the Ouachita Mountains to the south, it became well known as a base for migrants' settling of the "Wild West" and for its law enforcement heritage, as it was the hub for white law enforcement of the adjacent Indian Territory.

The city government is led by Mayor George McGill (D), who in 2018 was elected as the city's mayor (the first African American in its history), and a city Board of Directors composed of three members elected at-large and four members elected by ward.

== History ==
=== Pre-European exploration ===
No evidence indicates permanent indigenous settlements at the time of European contact in what became Fort Smith. In southern Fort Smith, a platform mound known as the Cavanaugh Mound exists in isolation and may have served as a vantage point from which the Spiro Mounds in present-day Oklahoma could be seen in earlier centuries.

=== European exploration and early settlement ===
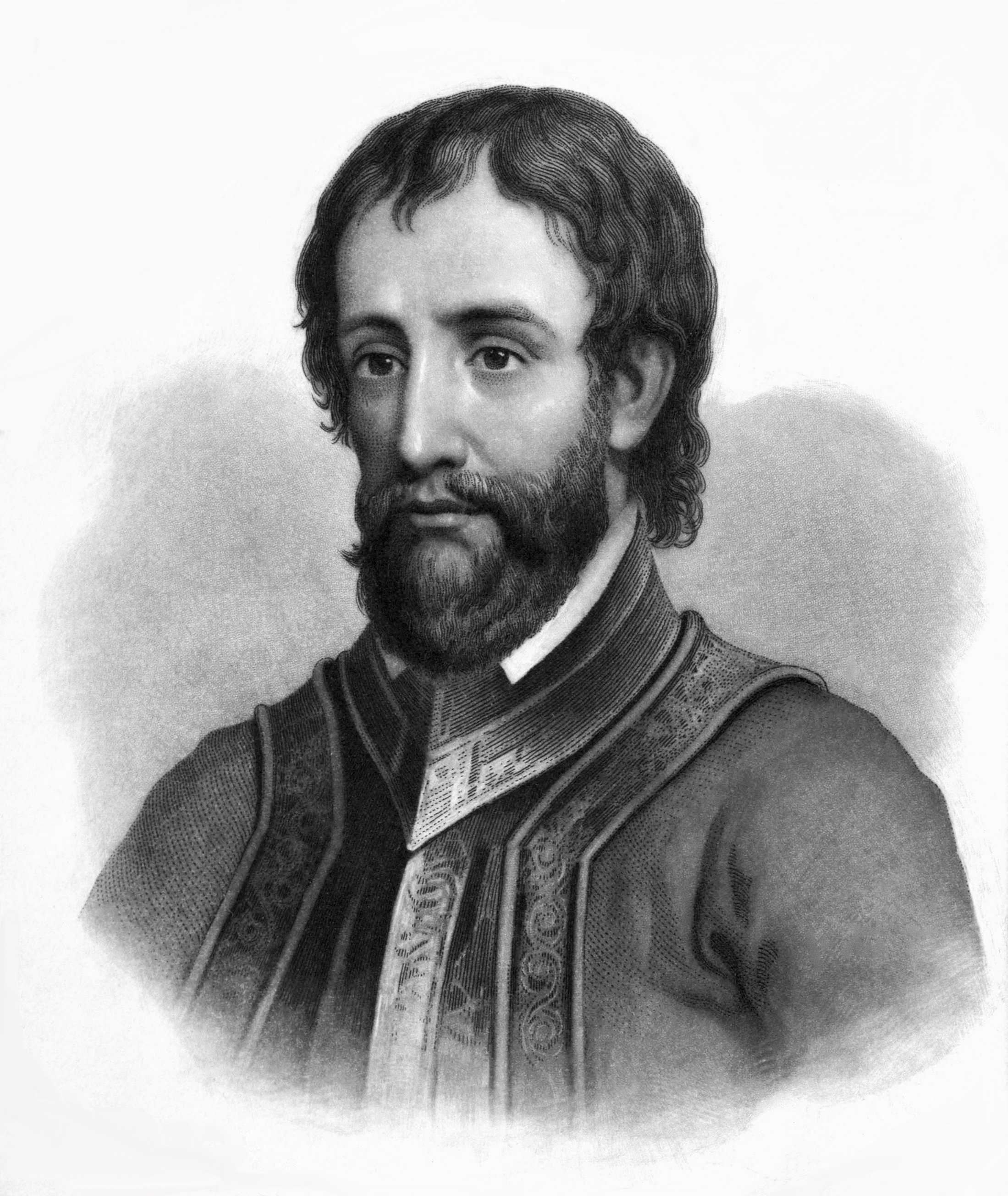
European explorer Hernando de Soto reached the Fort Smith area circa 1541

Hernando de Soto’s 1541 expedition into Arkansas may have reached as far west as the Fort Smith area. Place names such as Poteau, Belle Point, and Massard Prairie suggest later activity by French trappers who used the Arkansas River and its tributaries. The fertile Arkansas River Valley attracted early settlers, and Belle Point, a river bluff near the confluence of the Arkansas and Poteau rivers, provided a defensible location and broad visibility to the west.

=== Louisiana Purchase and early 19th century ===
In 1803, the United States acquired the region through the Louisiana Purchase. While the Lewis and Clark Expedition explored northern portions of the territory, the Pike Expedition of 1806 surveyed the southern areas along the Arkansas River.

In November 1817, U.S. Army troops established the first Fort Smith at Belle Point. The post was named for General Thomas Adams Smith, commander of the United States Army Rifle Regiment, although he never visited the site. The fort was initially intended to maintain peace between the Osage and Cherokee peoples. A small civilian settlement developed nearby. Major William Bradford commanded the post until its abandonment in 1824, when the Army relocated west to Fort Gibson.

John Rogers, an Army sutler and land speculator, purchased former government lands and promoted civilian growth. During the 1830s, amid federal Indian removal policies, the Army returned to Fort Smith and expanded the post. From this base, troops enforced the forced relocation of Southeastern tribes, including the Choctaw and Cherokee, to Indian Territory. The Cherokee later referred to this migration as the Trail of Tears. Many displaced people temporarily settled in Fort Smith and Van Buren.

=== Mid-19th century ===
Fort Smith served as a military and supply center during the Mexican–American War (1846–1848) and as an outfitting point for westward migrants during the California Gold Rush. One of the earliest overland wagon trains to California departed from Fort Smith in 1849. That same year, St. Andrew’s College was established, though it closed by 1860.

Sebastian County, Arkansas was created in 1851. In 1858, Fort Smith became a division center for the Butterfield Overland Mail and a junction for routes connecting to Memphis, Tennessee.

=== Civil War and Reconstruction ===
During the American Civil War, Confederate forces occupied Fort Smith until Union troops under General Frederick Steele captured it following the Battle of Devil's Backbone on September 1, 1863. Although Confederate raids continued, the Union Army retained control until 1865. The city became a refuge for formerly enslaved people, Unionists, and war refugees. Enslaved people were legally freed under the Emancipation Proclamation of 1863. Federal troops permanently withdrew from the fort in 1871.

After the war, Fort Smith hosted the Fort Smith Conference of 1865, which addressed relations between the federal government and tribes that had allied with the Confederacy. Military farm colonies were also established to support displaced populations.

=== Late 19th century ===
In 1874, W. H. H. Clayton was appointed U.S. Attorney for the United States District Court for the Western District of Arkansas by President Ulysses S. Grant. Clayton, with support from Grant and Senator Powell Clayton, secured the appointment of Judge Isaac C. Parker in 1875.

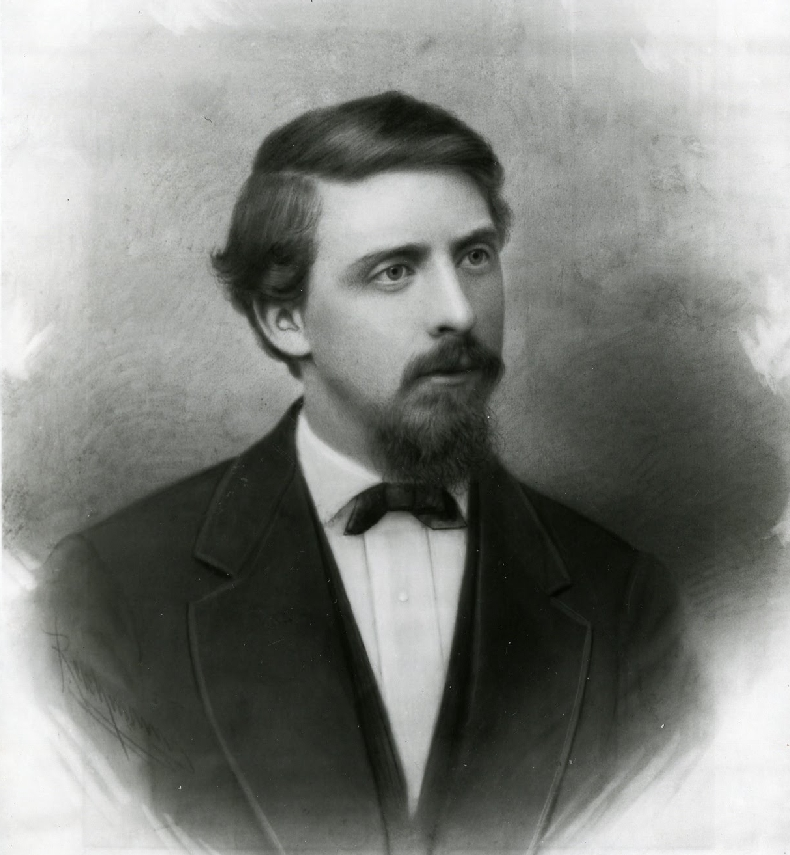
"The hanging Judge" Isaac C. Parker precided over Fort Smith in the early 19th century

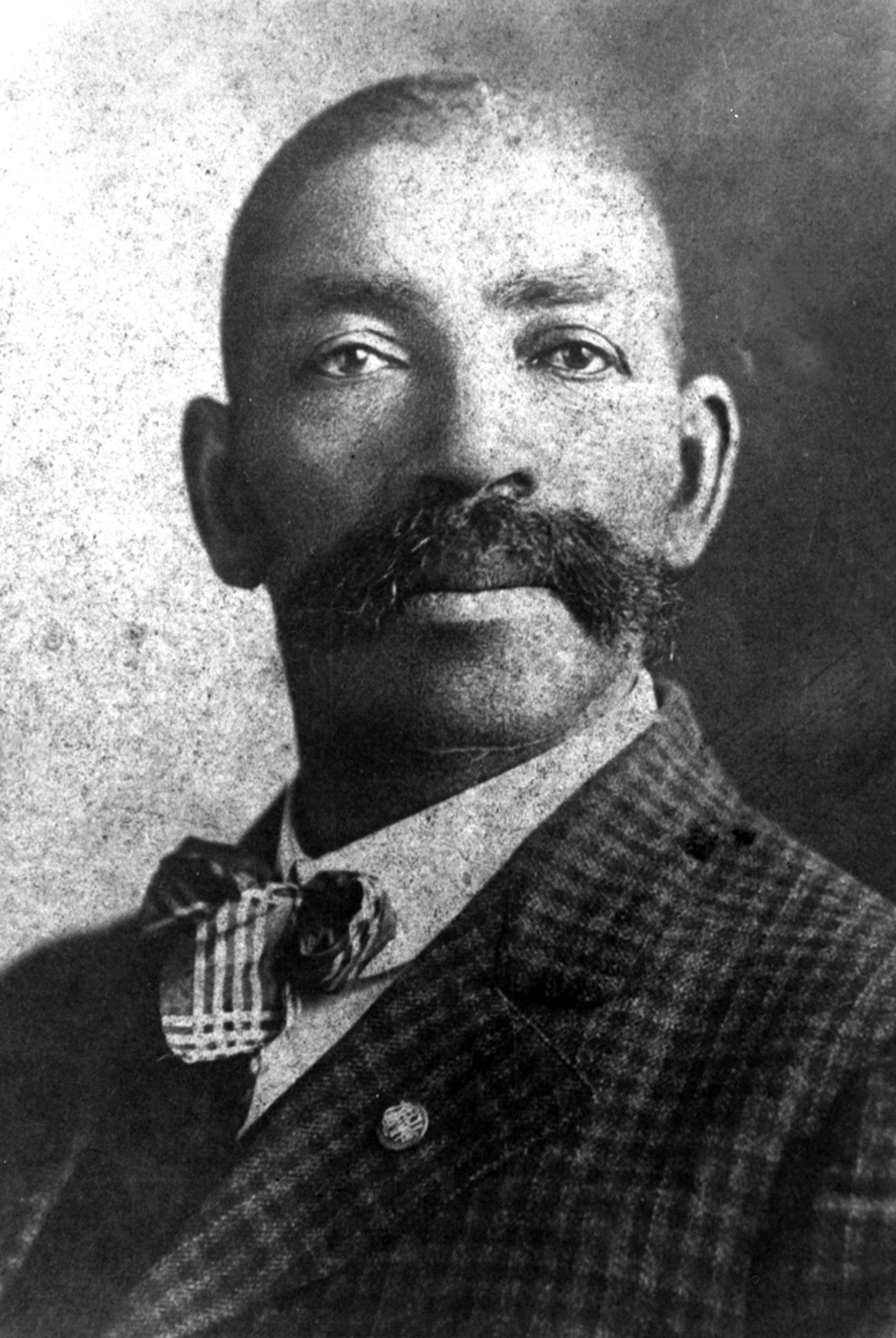
Lawman Bass Reeves was one of the first African-American law enforcers to work west of the Mississippi, and did so from his base in Fort Smith

Parker served until 1896 and became known as the "Hanging Judge". He sentenced 160 people to death, with 79 executions carried out. His courthouse is now part of the Fort Smith National Historic Site, noted as the location where more executions were conducted by the U.S. government than anywhere else in American history. Parker worked closely with African-American deputy marshal Bass Reeves.

The late nineteenth century saw rapid growth, aided by railroad expansion. In 1890, Sebastian County established a poor farm near the city, now marked by the Elmwood Poor Farm Cemetery. A tornado in 1898 killed more than fifty residents.

=== Early 20th century ===
Between 1907 and 1924, Fort Smith became one of the few U.S. cities to legalize and regulate prostitution in a designated district. Jim Crow laws enforced racial segregation in public facilities and transportation. On March 23, 1912, Sanford Lewis, an African American man, was lynched by a mob. Several police officers were later convicted for failing to intervene.

Natural gas discoveries and manufacturing, particularly glass and furniture, expanded the local economy. In 1917, telephone operators initiated a strike that escalated into a nine-day general strike. In 1922, an automobile bridge was completed across the Arkansas River.

=== Great Depression and World War II ===
During the Great Depression, Fort Smith was affected by economic hardship. The New Deal brought public works projects, including construction of Lake Fort Smith. In 1941, the Army established Fort Chaffee east of the city. Activated in 1942, it trained armored divisions and housed German prisoners of war.

=== Postwar era ===
Fort Chaffee was intermittently activated after the war. KFSM-TV, Arkansas’s second television station, began broadcasting in 1953. Manufacturing expanded during the 1950s and 1960s, with companies such as Baldor Electric and ABF Freight System growing alongside Whirlpool’s appliance factory, which opened as Norge in 1962.

Fort Smith pursued gradual school desegregation, avoiding the level of conflict seen elsewhere but maintaining de facto inequalities. Population and industrial growth continued into the 1970s.

=== Modern era ===
In 1975, Fort Chaffee served as a resettlement center for Vietnamese refugees. Additional Hispanic and Laotian communities settled in subsequent decades, establishing religious and cultural institutions.

On April 21, 1996, a tornado struck Fort Smith and Van Buren, killing four people and damaging much of downtown Fort Smith.

In early 1988, Fort Smith hosted the Fort Smith sedition trial involving fourteen right-wing extremists charged primarily with seditious conspiracy and related crimes, including alleged plots to overthrow the U.S. government and assassinate a federal judge and an FBI agent. Prosecutors presented extensive evidence and testimony describing a nationwide network of white supremacist groups allegedly involved in robberies, bombings, and planned attacks on federal institutions. Despite the scope of the case and testimony from nearly 200 witnesses, the jury acquitted all defendants of all charges on April 7, 1988. The verdict prompted widespread debate, with critics viewing it as a setback in efforts to combat organized extremism and supporters framing it as a defense of free speech.

== Geography ==
According to the United States Census Bureau, the city has a total area of 64.6 square miles (167 km^{2}), of which 61.7 square miles (160 km^{2}) is land and 3.9 square miles (10 km^{2}) (6.3%) is water.

=== Climate ===
Fort Smith has a humid subtropical climate with generally mild winters and hot, humid summers. The monthly mean temperature ranges from 40.4 °F (4.7 °C) in January to 83.1 °F (28.4 °C) in July; on average, the high stays at or below freezing on 3.8 days, reaches 90 °F (32 °C) on 77.8 days, and 100 °F (38 °C) on 11.1 days annually. The average first and last occurrences for freezing temperatures are November 6 and March 25, respectively. Extreme temperatures range from −15 °F (−26 °C) on February 12, 1899 to 115 °F (46 °C) on August 3, 2011. Fort Smith is situated near an area known as Tornado Alley in the central United States. The city has been struck by three major tornadoes, which occurred in the years of 1898, 1927 and 1996.

Climate data for Fort Smith Regional Airport, Arkansas (1991–2020 normals, (Note: Mean monthly maxima and minima (i.e. the highest and lowest temperature readings during an entire month or year) calculated based on data at said location from 1991 to 2020.) extremes 1882–present)
Month	Jan	Feb	Mar	Apr	May	Jun	Jul	Aug	Sep	Oct	Nov	Dec	Year
Record high °F (°C)	81 (27)	88 (31)	95 (35)	96 (36)	99 (37)	106 (41)	111 (44)	115 (46)	109 (43)	96 (36)	89 (32)	84 (29)	115 (46)
Mean maximum °F (°C)	72.7 (22.6)	75.9 (24.4)	83.5 (28.6)	87.6 (30.9)	91.7 (33.2)	95.9 (35.5)	101.6 (38.7)	101.5 (38.6)	96.5 (35.8)	89.6 (32.0)	79.8 (26.6)	72.7 (22.6)	103.3 (39.6)
Mean daily maximum °F (°C)	51.3 (10.7)	56.6 (13.7)	65.6 (18.7)	74.5 (23.6)	81.4 (27.4)	89.4 (31.9)	94.1 (34.5)	93.7 (34.3)	86.5 (30.3)	75.9 (24.4)	63.4 (17.4)	53.3 (11.8)	73.8 (23.2)
Daily mean °F (°C)	40.4 (4.7)	45.0 (7.2)	53.5 (11.9)	62.1 (16.7)	70.4 (21.3)	78.8 (26.0)	83.1 (28.4)	82.3 (27.9)	74.8 (23.8)	63.5 (17.5)	51.7 (10.9)	42.8 (6.0)	62.4 (16.9)
Mean daily minimum °F (°C)	29.6 (−1.3)	33.4 (0.8)	41.5 (5.3)	49.8 (9.9)	59.5 (15.3)	68.3 (20.2)	72.1 (22.3)	70.9 (21.6)	63.1 (17.3)	51.0 (10.6)	40.0 (4.4)	32.3 (0.2)	51.0 (10.6)
Mean minimum °F (°C)	14.8 (−9.6)	19.2 (−7.1)	24.2 (−4.3)	34.2 (1.2)	44.7 (7.1)	58.7 (14.8)	64.9 (18.3)	62.7 (17.1)	49.3 (9.6)	35.1 (1.7)	24.2 (−4.3)	18.5 (−7.5)	11.7 (−11.3)
Record low °F (°C)	−11 (−24)	−15 (−26)	7 (−14)	22 (−6)	34 (1)	47 (8)	50 (10)	45 (7)	33 (1)	22 (−6)	8 (−13)	−5 (−21)	−15 (−26)
Average precipitation inches (mm)	2.91 (74)	2.69 (68)	3.90 (99)	4.87 (124)	5.63 (143)	4.56 (116)	3.39 (86)	3.60 (91)	4.04 (103)	4.42 (112)	3.85 (98)	3.48 (88)	47.34 (1,202)
Average snowfall inches (cm)	1.4 (3.6)	0.6 (1.5)	0.3 (0.76)	0.0 (0.0)	0.0 (0.0)	0.0 (0.0)	0.0 (0.0)	0.0 (0.0)	0.0 (0.0)	0.0 (0.0)	0.0 (0.0)	0.6 (1.5)	2.9 (7.4)
Average precipitation days (≥ 0.01 in)	7.5	7.6	10.1	9.2	10.9	9.0	7.0	7.2	7.1	8.1	7.4	7.9	99.0
Average snowy days (≥ 0.1 in)	0.6	0.5	0.3	0.0	0.0	0.0	0.0	0.0	0.0	0.0	0.0	0.3	1.7
Average relative humidity (%)	69.5	67.6	63.9	63.8	70.7	70.9	68.9	68.6	71.8	69.4	70.3	71.2	68.9
Average dew point °F (°C)	26.1 (−3.3)	30.0 (−1.1)	37.8 (3.2)	47.1 (8.4)	57.7 (14.3)	65.5 (18.6)	68.5 (20.3)	66.9 (19.4)	61.5 (16.4)	49.5 (9.7)	39.4 (4.1)	30.0 (−1.1)	48.3 (9.1)
Mean monthly sunshine hours	173.5	172.5	215.2	236.1	274.8	304.0	327.6	294.5	233.1	220.7	162.5	156.3	2,770.8
Percentage possible sunshine	55	56	58	60	63	70	74	71	63	63	52	51	62
Source: NOAA (relative humidity, dew point, and sun 1961–1990)

== Demographics ==
Historical population
Census	Pop.	Note	%±
1840	144		—
1850	964		569.4%
1860	1,532		58.9%
1870	2,227		45.4%
1880	3,099		39.2%
1890	11,311		265.0%
1900	11,587		2.4%
1910	23,975		106.9%
1920	28,870		20.4%
1930	31,429		8.9%
1940	36,584		16.4%
1950	47,942		31.0%
1960	52,991		10.5%
1970	62,802		18.5%
1980	71,626		14.1%
1990	72,798		1.6%
2000	80,268		10.3%
2010	86,209		7.4%
2020	89,142		3.4%
2025 (est.)	90,855	▲	1.9%
U.S. Decennial Census

=== Racial and ethnic composition ===
Fort Smith, Arkansas – Racial and ethnic composition Note: the US Census treats Hispanic/Latino as an ethnic category. This table excludes Latinos from the racial categories and assigns them to a separate category. Hispanics/Latinos may be of any race.
Race / Ethnicity (NH = Non-Hispanic)	Pop. 2000	Pop. 2010	Pop. 2020	% 2000	% 2010	% 2020
White alone (NH)	59,436	55,654	50,728	74.05%	64.56%	56.91%
Black or African American alone (NH)	6,874	7,621	7,602	8.56%	8.84%	8.53%
Native American or Alaska Native alone (NH)	1,254	1,408	1,555	1.56%	1.63%	1.74%
Asian alone (NH)	3,661	4,524	5,103	4.56%	5.25%	5.72%
Pacific Islander or Native Hawaiian alone (NH)	29	59	65	0.04%	0.07%	0.07%
Other race alone (NH)	48	66	227	0.06%	0.08%	0.25%
Mixed race or Multiracial (NH)	1,918	2,687	6,396	2.39%	3.12%	7.18%
Hispanic or Latino (any race)	7,048	14,190	17,466	8.78%	16.46%	19.59%
Total	80,268	86,209	89,142	100.00%	100.00%	100.00%

=== 2020 census ===
As of the 2020 census, Fort Smith had a population of 89,142. A total of 22,349 families resided in the city.

The median age was 36.9 years. 23.7% of residents were under the age of 18 and 15.9% of residents were 65 years of age or older. For every 100 females there were 94.4 males, and for every 100 females age 18 and over there were 92.1 males age 18 and over.

98.8% of residents lived in urban areas, while 1.2% lived in rural areas.

There were 36,266 households in Fort Smith, of which 29.8% had children under the age of 18 living in them. Of all households, 39.4% were married-couple households, 21.3% were households with a male householder and no spouse or partner present, and 31.2% were households with a female householder and no spouse or partner present. About 32.6% of all households were made up of individuals and 12.1% had someone living alone who was 65 years of age or older.

There were 40,327 housing units, of which 10.1% were vacant. The homeowner vacancy rate was 2.3% and the rental vacancy rate was 10.1%.

Racial composition as of the 2020 census
Race	Number	Percent
White	54,222	60.8%
Black or African American	7,758	8.7%
American Indian and Alaska Native	1,994	2.2%
Asian	5,181	5.8%
Native Hawaiian and Other Pacific Islander	79	0.1%
Some other race	9,721	10.9%
Two or more races	10,187	11.4%

=== 2010 census ===
As of the 2010 census, there were 86,209 people, 34,352 households, and 21,367 families residing in the city. The population density was 1,391.2 inhabitants per square mile (537.1/km^{2}). There were 37,899 housing units at an average density of 612.3 per square mile (236.4/km^{2}). The racial makeup of the city was 69.3% White, 9.0% Black or African American, 1.8% Native American, 5.3% Asian (2.2% Vietnamese, 1.7% Laotian, 0.3% Asian Indian, 0.2% Filipino, 0.1% Korean, 0.1% Chinese, 0.1% Hmong, 0.1% Pakistani), 0.1% Pacific Islander, 10.3% from other races, and 4.2% from two or more races. 16.5% of the population were Hispanic or Latino of any race (11.6% Mexican, 2.2% Salvadoran, 0.4% Guatemalan, 0.3% Puerto Rican, 0.2% Honduran, 0.1% Cuban, 0.1% Peruvian, 0.1% Colombian).

=== Language ===
More than ten Asian languages spoken by more than two percent of the population. Also, the increase in immigration from Latin American countries in the late 20th century increased the number of residents who speak Spanish. 7.10% reported speaking Spanish at home, while 3.38% speak Vietnamese and Lao, and 2.50% speak Tagalog.

=== 2000 census ===
In 2000, there were 32,398 households, of which 30.8% had children under the age of 18 living with them, 47.1% were married couples living together, 12.3% had a female householder with no husband present, and 36.3% were non-families. 30.7% of all households were made up of individuals, and 10.9% had someone living alone who was 65 years of age or older. The average household size was 2.42 and the average family size was 3.03.

In the city, the population was spread out, with 25.4% under the age of 18, 9.8% from 18 to 24, 29.3% from 25 to 44, 21.8% from 45 to 64, and 13.7% who were 65 years of age or older. The median age was 35 years. For every 100 females, there were 94.1 males. For every 100 females age 18 and over, there were 91.0 males.

The median income for a household in the city was $32,157, and the median income for a family was $41,012. Males had a median income of $29,799 versus $22,276 for females. The per capita income for the city was $18,994. About 12.1% of families and 15.8% of the population were below the poverty line, including 22.2% of those under age 18 and 9.6% of those age 65 or over.

== Economy ==
Fort Smith has long been a regional manufacturing center, with major plants located in the city operated by Rheem, Trane, Georgia-Pacific, Gerber, Kraft Heinz Company-Planters Peanuts, Mars Petcare, Umarex USA, Graphic Packaging, International Paper, Pernod Ricard-USA, and many others.

Fort Smith is home to several corporations, including ABB Motors & Mechanical, ArcBest and poultry company OK Foods.

According to the city's 2024 Annual Comprehensive Financial Report, the top employers in the city are:

#	Employer	# of Employees
1	Mercy-Fort Smith	3,413
2	Fort Smith Public Schools	2,424
3	ArcBest	2,020
4	OK Foods	1,900
5	Baptist Health (formerly Sparks Health)	1,850
6	ABB Motors & Mechanical	1,632
7	Walmart	1,561
10	Rheem Manufacturing	1,171
9	City of Fort Smith	1,119
10	University of Arkansas at Fort Smith	1,089

== Culture ==
Various television programs and movies have been filmed in Fort Smith, including The Blue and The Gray (1982), A Soldier's Story (1984), Biloxi Blues (1988) Trespass and Tuskegee Airmen (1995)

=== Museums ===
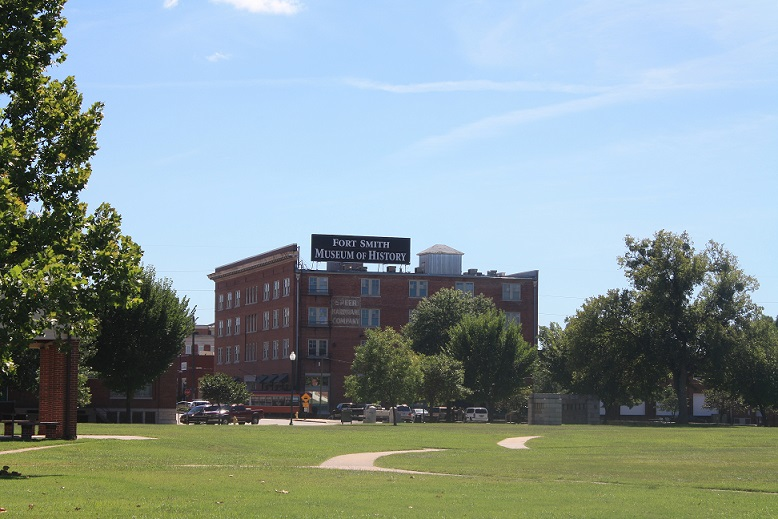
The Fort Smith Museum of History

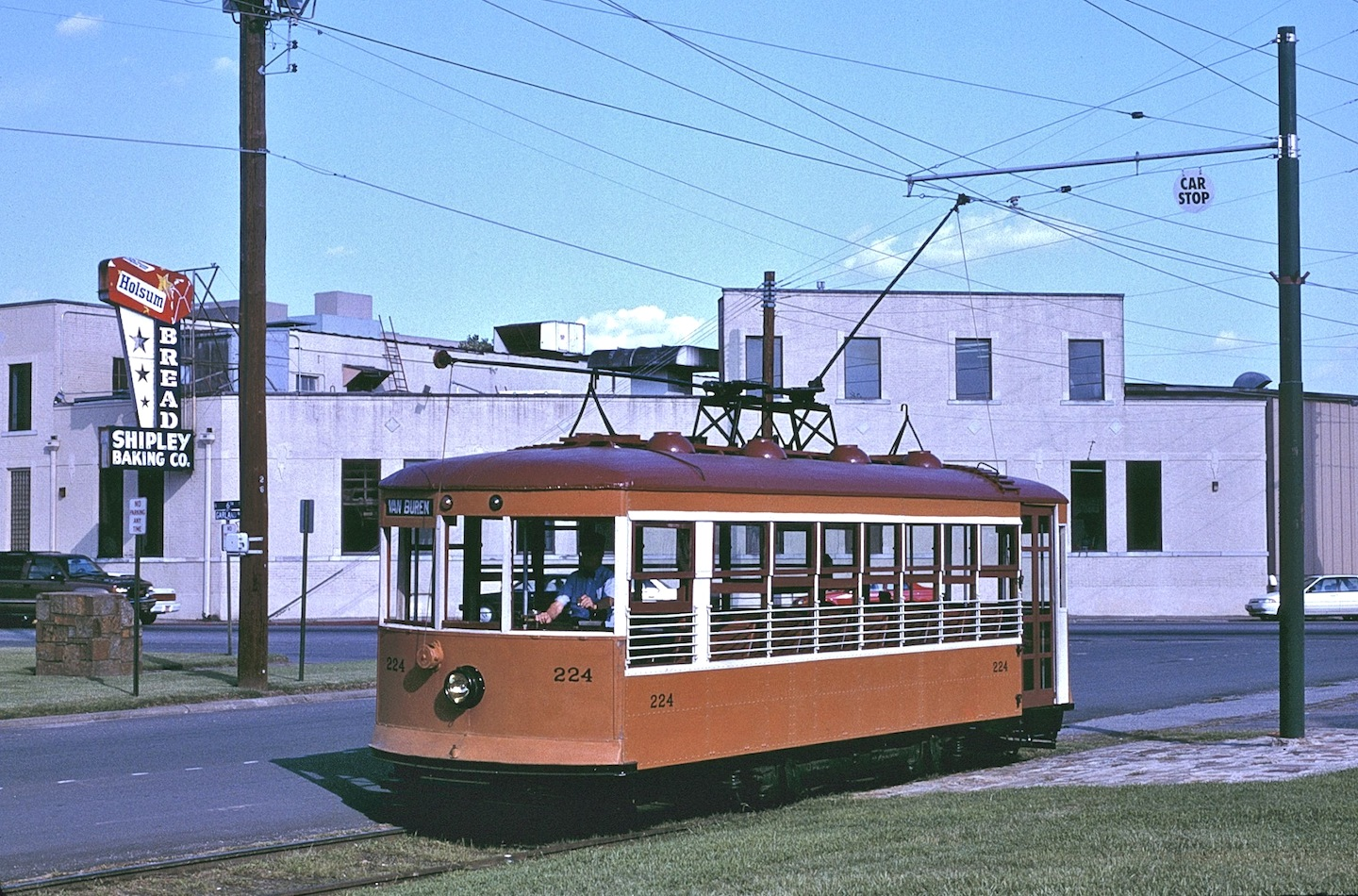
The Fort Smith Trolley Museum offers trolley rides year-round.

There are several museums in Fort Smith, located primarily in the downtown area and the Chaffee Crossing Historic District.

- Fort Smith Regional Art Museum opened to the public on January 19, 2013.
- Fort Smith Museum of History, located almost adjacent to the National Historic Site. The museum contains numerous exhibits, displays and artifacts that tell the story of Fort Smith's history—from the first fort in 1817, through the westward expansion, and on to the Civil War, the Gay Nineties, Fort Chaffee, and the emergence of a modern city.
- Fort Smith Trolley Museum is a railroad museum which displays a number of antique trolleys and related items. One of the trolley cars and three of the locomotives in its collection are listed on the National Register of Historic Places.
- Fort Smith Air Museum is dedicated to preserving the history of the development of aviation in Western Arkansas and Eastern Oklahoma.
- The Clayton House Museum is the original home of William H.H. Clayton. It is open for tours and rentals for weddings, meetings, events, and much more. The house holds many Clayton artifacts, and boldly tells the history of Mr. Clayton as well as the western frontier
- Chaffee Barbershop Museum - located in the Chaffee Crossing Historic District in east Fort Smith, this museum was the location where, on March 25, 1958, Elvis Presley received his iconic G.I buzz cut
- The United States Marshals Museum documents the heritage and legacy of the United States Marshals Service, America's oldest federal law enforcement agency.

=== Music ===
Fort Smith has an active music scene. There are frequent live performances in the downtown area by local and national Jazz, Blues, Country, Americana and Rock bands. Local bands regularly frequent the riverfront area highlighting the river valley's finest.

- Fort Smith Symphony - the symphony is a per-service professional orchestra composed of musicians from Fort Smith, Fayetteville, Springfield, Tulsa, Oklahoma City, Norman, Dallas, Little Rock, New York, Florida and other communities. The Fort Smith Symphony, conducted by John Jeter, regularly performs at the ArcBest Performing Arts Center.

== Attractions ==
As the third largest city in Arkansas, Fort Smith offers many activities and attractions. Fort Smith's theater and event venues regularly host major concerts and touring theater companies.

=== Event venues ===
- Riverfront Amphitheater - Located next to the Arkansas River, the Riverfront Amphitheater represents one-third of the River Park Complex.
- Fort Smith Convention Center, with 140,000 square feet of space, is one of the largest convention centers in the region, second only to Little Rock's Statehouse Convention Center, with 225,000 square feet. Fort Smith Convention Center has more than 40,000 square feet (3,700 m^{2}) of exhibition space. Many trade shows, conventions, and other events are held here each year. The performing arts theater is home to the Fort Smith Symphony and has seating for 1,331 people.
- Kay Rodgers Park - site of the Expo Center, with 24,000 square feet (2,200 m^{2}) of meeting and exhibition space, and the Harper Arena, which is a covered open-air stadium that can seat 7,000 to 14,000 attendees for a variety of events.
- The Blue Lion - This Performing and Visual Arts Center has an intimate 250-seat theater and 1,500 square feet (100 m^{2}) Art Gallery.

=== Shopping ===
Fort Smith is the main shopping destination of Western Arkansas and Eastern Oklahoma. Central Mall is the city's largest indoor shopping center in terms of area.

Some notable shopping locations in the city of Fort Smith are:

- Rogers Avenue
  - Central Mall
  - GreenPointe Shopping Center
  - Massard Crossing
  - Stonewood Village
  - Williamsburg Square
- Phoenix Avenue/Greenwood Ave.
  - Fort Smith Pavilion
  - May Branch Square
  - Phoenix Center

=== Landmarks ===
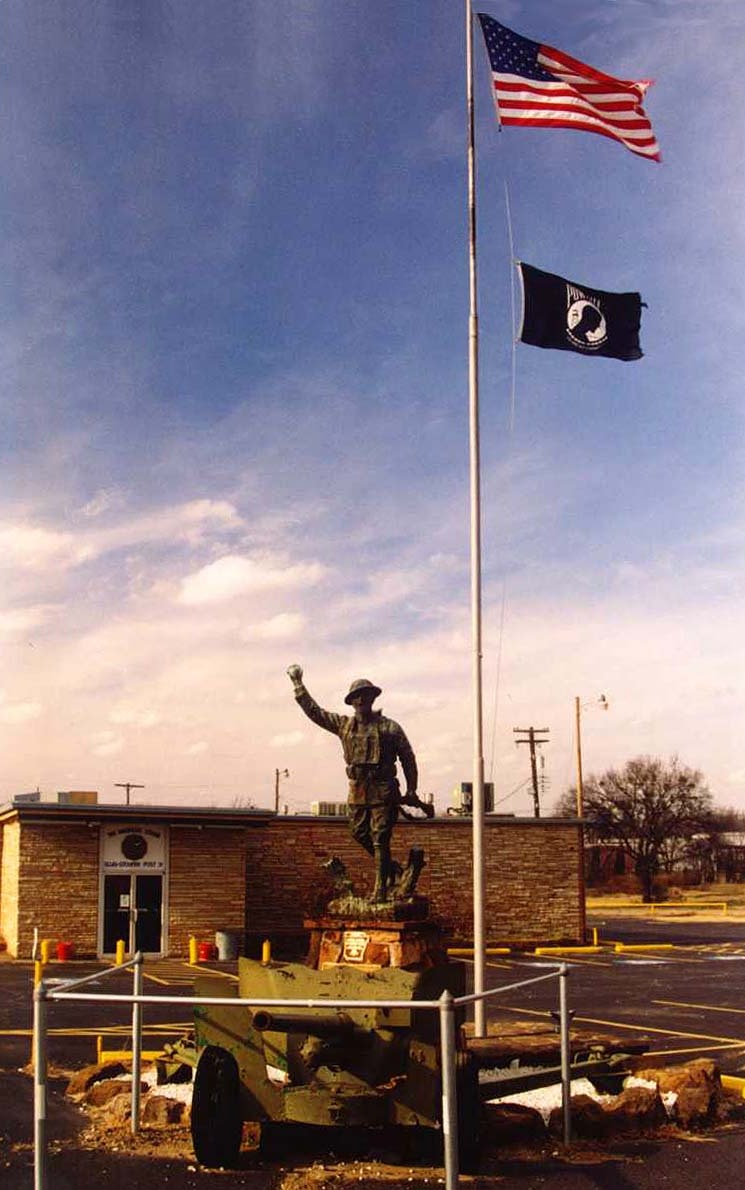
Spirit of the American Doughboy

- Fort Smith National Historic Site, the most prominent landmark, which includes the remains of the original 1817 fort on the Arkansas River. Inside is the restored courtroom of the famed "Hangin' Judge" Isaac C. Parker, and the dingy frontier jail aptly named "Hell on the Border." Eventually, this would become the unofficial nickname for all of Fort Smith.
- Belle Grove Historic District, a 22-block area in downtown Fort Smith comprises nearly 25 restored homes that span 130 years of varying architectural styles.
- Clayton House Museum, formerly the home of W. H. H. Clayton, United States Attorney for the United States District Court for the Western District of Arkansas and chief prosecutor in the court of "hanging judge" Isaac Parker, was built for Clayton in 1882 and owned by him until 1912. The house was listed on the National Register of Historic Places in 1970.
- Miss Laura's Social Club, a former brothel and the only remaining building from the Row, is home to the city's Convention and Visitors Bureau and the only former house of prostitution on the National Register of Historic Places.
- Fort Chaffee, primarily used as a training facility by regional National Guard and Reserve Corps units as well as active military units from other installations. In 1958, the entertainer Elvis Presley stopped off at Fort Chaffee en route to his basic training in Texas. It was here that the public information officer John J. Mawn told a news conference that Presley would receive the standard "G.I. haircut" and would resemble a "peeled onion".

=== Annual attractions ===
- Peacemaker Music Fest - held each summer since 2015 at the Riverfront Amphitheater, performers have included Jason Isbell, Grace Potter, Lucero, The Revivalists, Anderson East, Samantha Fish and Ryan Bingham
- Unexpected - Urban Contemporary Art Festival - held each fall since 2015, artists have included D*Face, Okuda San Miguel, Maser, Alexis Diaz, Add Fuel and Ana Maria
- Fort Smith Riverfront Blues Fest - held since 1991 along the Arkansas River in downtown Fort Smith
- Steel Horse Rally - a motorcycle rally held each spring since 2015 to raise money for local charities
- Arkansas-Oklahoma State Fair - this bi-state fair occurs over a ten-day period in late September
- Old Fort Days Rodeo - Fort Smith's annual Old Fort Days Rodeo and Barrel-Racing Futurity offers nearly ten days of Wild West activities. It has been held every May since the mid-1930s
- Fort Smith Brewing Anniversary - Held the last Saturday of September every year since 2017, this festival showcases Fort Smith's only Brewery and is a celebration of the new economic zone known as the Chaffee Crossing Historic District.
- Hanging Judge Border Feud High School Rodeo is held every March or April, schedule permitting. This event is held at Kay Rodgers Park, and includes rodeo events as well as a spring livestock show. The events are open to any high school students
- Fort Smith Juneteenth Community Festival - Juneteenth is the oldest nationally celebrated commemoration of the ending of slavery in the United States

== Sports and recreation ==
In addition to sports teams sponsored by Fort Smith Public Schools and University of Arkansas-Fort Smith, Fort Smith has several independent recreational sports programs and annual tournaments administered by local organizations:

- Fort Smith Marshals (Mid America Baseball League)
- Fort Smith Marathon
- Battle at the Fort Volleyball Tournament - held each January at the Fort Smith Convention Center
- United Way Charity Golf Classic - May 2020 at Hardscrabble Country Club
- Fort Smith Tournament of Champions - high school basketball tournament
- Fort Smith Church League Baseball
- Ben Geren Softball Association
- River Valley Futbol Club
- River Valley Cycling Club
- Western Arkansas Pickleball Association
- Wamer Shopping League

== Education ==
=== Higher education ===
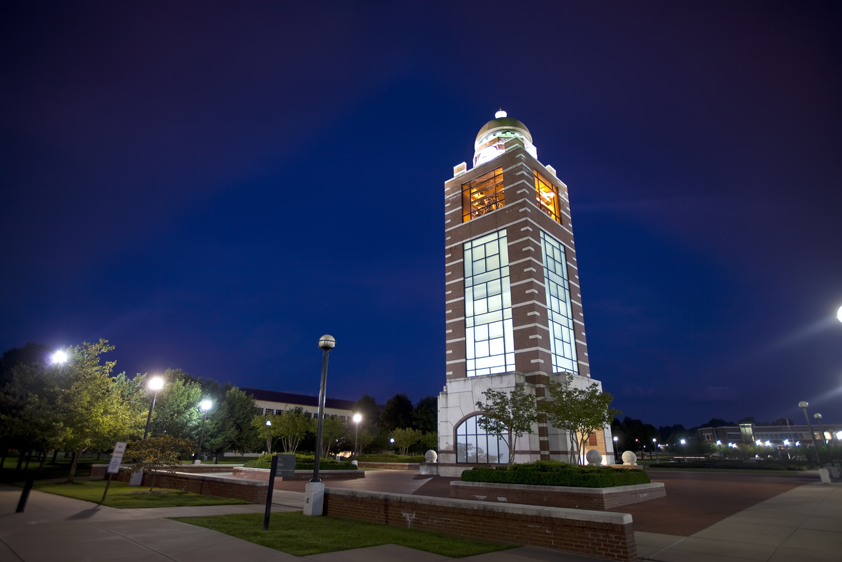
Reynolds Bell Tower

The city has one major university that is part of the University of Arkansas System. The University of Arkansas at Fort Smith was founded in 1928 as an extension of the Fort Smith Public School system, with the superintendent, James William Ramsey, acting as the college president and the high school principal as dean. Known originally as Fort Smith Junior College, the institution operated within the Fort Smith public school system until 1950, when the school was incorporated as a private, nonprofit institution with its own governing board. In September 1952, the college moved from borrowed facilities in the high school to its current site, initially occupying 15 acres (6.07 ha).

In 1966, the institution's name was changed from Fort Smith Junior College to Westark Junior College and in 1972, it was renamed Westark Community College, indicating the larger area to be served and reflecting the more comprehensive mission.

The name of the college was changed yet again in February 1998 to Westark College, more accurately portraying the role and scope of the institution.

On December 15, 2000, the Board of Trustees of Westark College entered into an agreement with the Board of Trustees of the University of Arkansas to merge with the University of Arkansas System as a four-year institution. In 2001, the Sebastian County electorate voted to support the merger. A formal request to change affiliation status to that of a bachelor's degree-granting institution under the name of the University of Arkansas at Fort Smith was submitted to the Higher Learning Commission in August 2001 and approved by the Institutional Actions Council on November 19, 2001.

The merger, which became official on January 1, 2002, endorsed the concept of UA-Fort Smith as a unique university, one that offers applied and traditional baccalaureate degree programs, one- and two-year associate and technical programs, and noncredit business and industry training programs. While the University of Arkansas at Fort Smith is the city's only state supported institution of higher learning.

In addition to the University of Arkansas-Fort Smith (UAFS), the Arkansas College of Osteopathic Medicine (ARCOM), a private, non-profit institution, welcomed its inaugural class in August 2017. Graduates of ARCOM receive a Doctor of Osteopathic Medicine (DO) degree.

=== Elementary and secondary education ===
The public schools in the majority of Fort Smith, as well as a section of Barling, are operated by the Fort Smith School District. Currently, the district includes 26 schools. During the 2019–2020 school year, the district had an enrollment of more than 14,748 students. It has 2 high schools, 4 middle schools, 19 elementary schools, and 1 alternative learning center.

Fort Smith public schools provide education from kindergarten through the 12th grade, as do some private Protestant schools. Catholic parochial schools offer education through the ninth grade.

Middle Schools in Fort Smith include Chaffin Middle School, Ramsey Middle School, Kimmons Middle School, and Darby Middle School. Private schools covering the same grade range include Trinity Catholic School, Union Christian Academy, and Northside Christian Academy.

High schools in Fort Smith include the public Northside High School and Southside High School, along with the private Union Christian Academy and Northside Christian Academy.

Parts of Fort Smith in the south are zoned to Greenwood School District.

Fort Smith previously had a Catholic grade school for black children, St. John the Baptist School; it closed in 1968.

== Media ==
=== Print ===
The Southwest Times Record is the largest newspaper in the city, as well as the region. It is owned by the USA Today Co.. The Hispanos Unidos is the only Spanish-language publication in the region. Other publications in the Fort Smith area include Entertainment Fort Smith and Do South Magazine.

=== Radio ===
AM radio Stations in the Fort Smith area include:

Call letters	Frequency	Format
KFSA	950	Christian
KFPW	1230	Nostalgia
KWHN	1320	News Talk
KFSW	1650	Southern Gospel

FM Radio Stations in the Fort Smith area include:

Call letters	Frequency	Format
KAOW	88.9	Religious
KBHN	89.7	Christian
KLFS	90.3	Christian
KLFH	90.7	Contemporary Christian
KUAF	91.3	Public Radio
KREU	92.3	Spanish
KISR	93.7	Top 40
KFPW	94.5	Hard Rock
KERX	95.3	Sports
KKBD	95.9	Classic Rock
KZBB	97.9	Variety
KMAG	99.1	Country
KTCS	99.9	Country
KNSH	100.7	Country
KGDA-LP	102.3	Spanish Christian
KBBQ-FM	102.7	Urban/Hip Hop
KHGG	103.5	Sports
KQBK	104.7	Oldies
KZKZ	106.3	Christian
KEZA	107.9	Adult Contemporary

=== Television ===
Television stations in the Fort Smith area include:

Call letters	Number	Network
KFSM	5	CBS
KAFT	13	PBS
KFTA	24	Fox
KWNL	31	Univision
KXNW	34	MyNetworkTV
KHBS	40	ABC; The CW Plus (DT2)
KFDF	44	Estrella TV
KNWA	51	NBC

== Infrastructure ==
=== Transportation ===
Fort Smith is a major transportation hub for the surrounding region. It sits at the crossroads of two major interstate highways, is surrounded on three sides by the Arkansas River, is served by 1 major and 2 regional/switching railroad companies, and is the home of a regional airport.

The city sits just southwest of the intersection of Interstate 40 and Interstate 49. Interstate 49 will extend southward to meet Interstate 30 in Texarkana, Texas. US 71 and US 64 also run through the community.

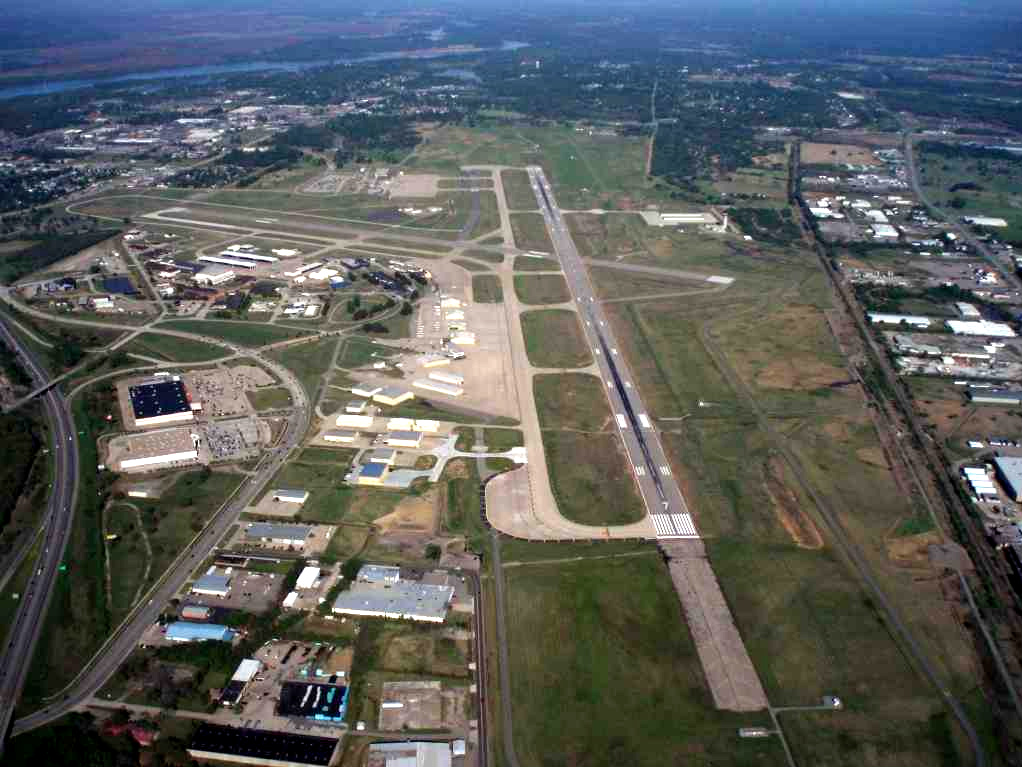
Fort Smith Regional Airport

Fort Smith is served by the Fort Smith Regional Airport (FSM), which is used for military aviation for Fort Chaffee and home of the 188th Fighter Wing of the Arkansas Air National Guard, and is served by one commercial airline with flights to Dallas/Fort Worth.

Jefferson Lines bus service also links Fort Smith to other communities such as Little Rock, Kansas City, and Oklahoma City, as well as intermediate points, with numerous connections to other cities and towns.

The city is located on the Arkansas River, part of the McClellan-Kerr Navigation System and is served by the Port of Fort Smith.

Fort Smith is served by the Kansas City Southern Railway from a branch connection on the mainline at Poteau, Oklahoma, and affords connections to other railroads at Kansas City, Missouri, and at New Orleans, Louisiana. In addition, the regional railroad company, the Arkansas and Missouri Railroad directly serves Fort Smith and provides connections through the St. Louis, Missouri, and Memphis gateways to the east. The Fort Smith Railroad provides local switching service to a variety of businesses as well as providing haulage for the Union Pacific Railway with which it connects at Van Buren, Arkansas. At this time, there is no direct passenger service from Amtrak. The closest point for such service is Little Rock.

Within the city, public bus service is provided by Fort Smith Transit (FST). As of January 2015, FST operates 6 fixed routes, as well as paratransit service for disabled persons and Demand Buses.

A trolley-replica bus operates in the downtown area, providing transportation between the Belle Grove Historic District and the Fort Smith National Historic Site. The Fort Smith Trolley Museum operates genuine trolleys, but as a historic attraction, rather than as transportation.

=== Utilities ===
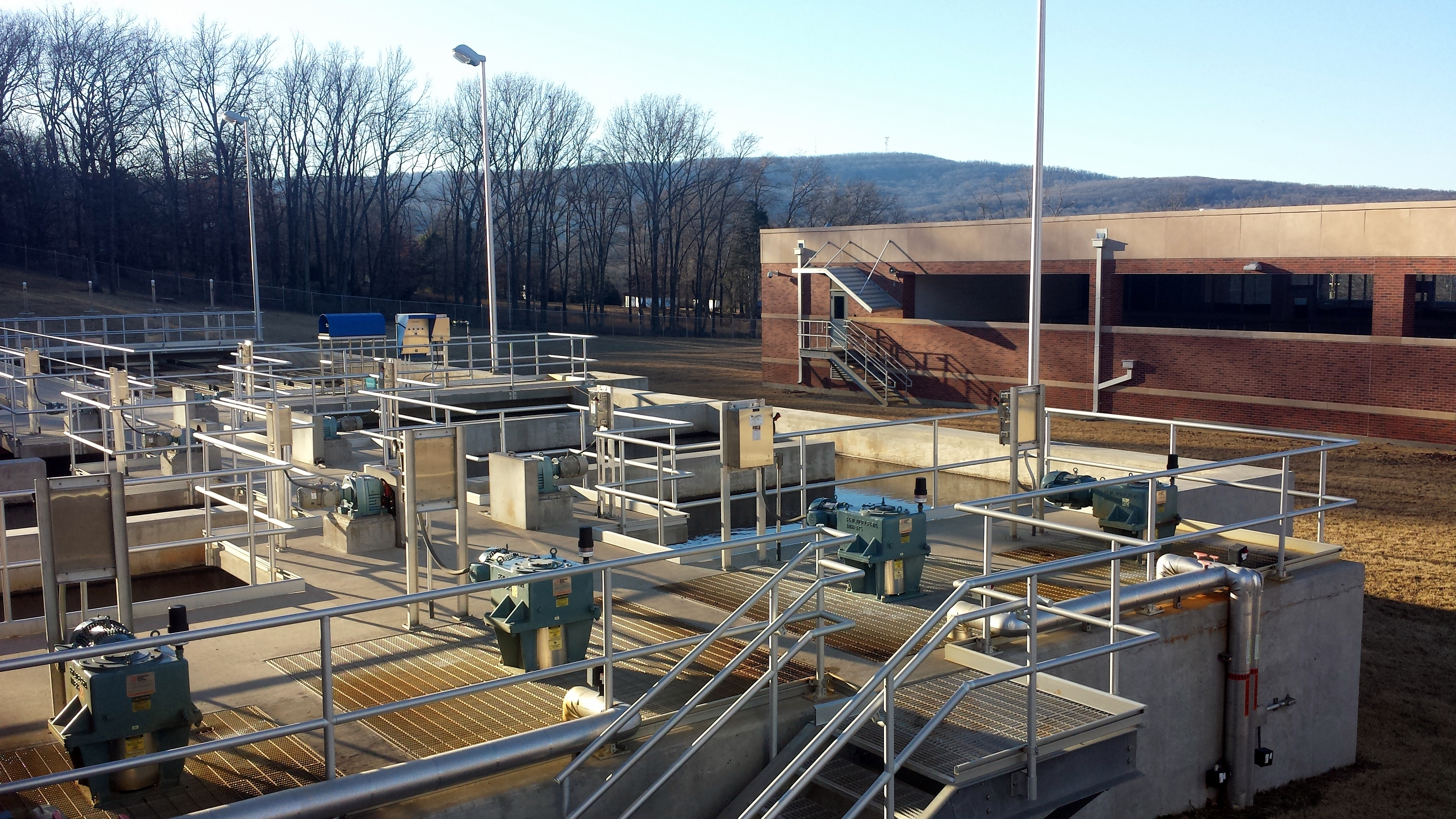
View of the coagulation and flocculation processes at the Lake Fort Smith WTP

Fort Smith uses two water treatment plants (WTPs) for its drinking water; one near Lake Fort Smith in Mountainburg and one on Lee Creek. The city announced August 12, 2021, that the Massard Water Reclamation Facility would need to undergo a $22 million upgrade to avoid failure. If failure occurs, nearly all of East Fort Smith and surrounding towns would be without wastewater treatment, causing wastewater to flow into the Arkansas River. It has had little to no upgrades since built in 1966.

=== Healthcare ===
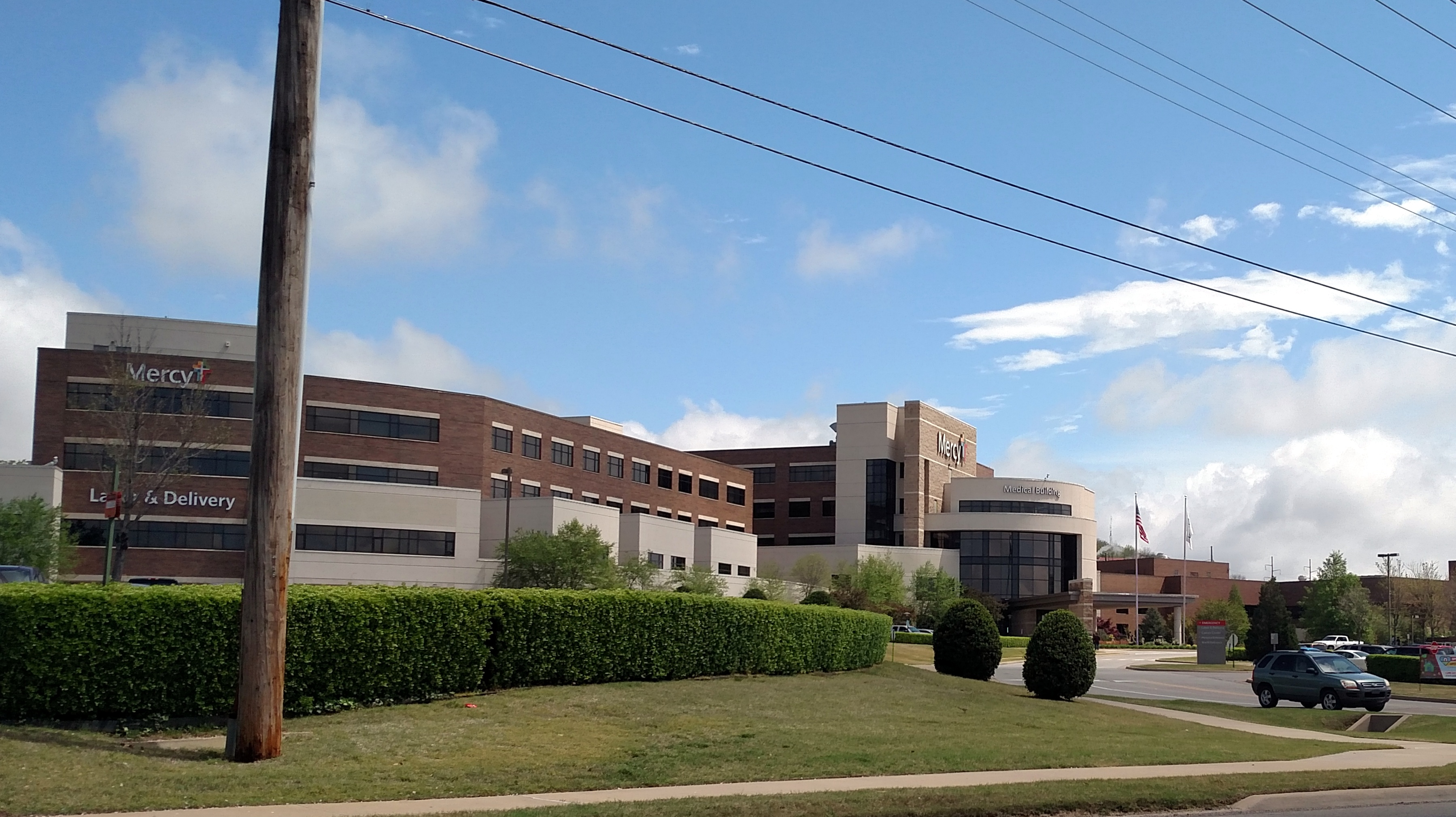
Mercy Hospital in Fort Smith

Hospitals in Fort Smith include:

- Mercy Hospital Fort Smith
- Baptist Health-Fort Smith (Formerly Sparks Regional Medical Center)
- HealthSouth Rehabilitation Hospital
- Valley Behavioral Health System
- Mercy Orthopedic Hospital
- Select Specialty Hospital

== Notable people ==
Notable figures who were born in, lived in, or are otherwise associated with Fort Smith.

=== Athletes ===
- Martine Bercher, former University of Arkansas All-American defensive back
- Ron Brewer, former University of Arkansas shooting guard, drafted by the Portland Trail Blazers
- Kodi Burns, former Auburn University quarterback, coach for the New Orleans Saints
- Ravin Caldwell, former National Football League player
- Glen Condren, former National Football League player, New York Giants and Atlanta Falcons; born in Fort Smith, 1942
- Harry Feldman, former Major League Baseball player
- Jim Files, former National Football League player
- Jack Fleck, professional golfer, 1955 US Open winner.
- Ryan Franklin, pitcher for St. Louis Cardinals and Olympic gold medalist
- Craig Gentry, Major League Baseball player
- Brett Goode, former National Football League player with the Green Bay Packers
- Neale Henderson, Negro League baseball player
- Priest Holmes, former National Football League player
- Isaiah Joe, former University of Arkansas Shooting Guard, drafted by the Philadelphia 76ers
- Jim King, former National Basketball Association player and NBA All-Star
- Gus Malzahn, college football coach
- Dat Nguyen, former linebacker for the Dallas Cowboys
- Jahlil Okafor, basketball player, Philadelphia 76ers and Brooklyn Nets; born in Fort Smith
- Scotty Robertson, coached at C.E. Byrd High School in Shreveport, Louisiana, Louisiana Tech University in Ruston, and for four NBA teams; born in Fort Smith in 1930
- Cole Rouse, American auto racing driver
- Carson Wiggins, baseball player in the New York Mets organization
- Jaylin Williams, former University of Arkansas center, drafted by the Oklahoma City Thunder

=== Actors, musicians, and media ===
- Katharine Alexander (1898–1981), actress
- James Cotten, film director, actor, writer, producer
- Juliette Danielle, actress
- Hunter Doohan, actor
- Charlie Jones (1930–2008), sportscaster
- Douglas C. Jones (1924–1998), author of historical fiction
- Brandon Keener, actor
- Jerry Keller, singer
- Laurence Luckinbill, actor
- Rudy Ray Moore (1927–2008), singer and actor
- Brad Neely, modern web artist
- Marty Stouffer, creator of Wild America TV series
- Alphonso Trent (1902–1959), jazz bandleader and musician

=== Politicians, lawyers, and judges ===
- H. H. Atherton (1833–1904), Minnesota state senator
- Hugh M. Bland (1898–1967), associate justice of the Arkansas Supreme Court in 1966
- John Boozman (born 1950), United States Senator and former United States Representative for Arkansas's 3rd congressional district; Northside High School graduate and football player for the Arkansas Razorbacks; brother of Fay Boozman
- Virgil Bozeman (1912–2007), Illinois state representative and lawyer
- Charles Winchester Breedlove, Los Angeles City Council member, 1933–45, born in Fort Smith
- Clifton R. Breckinridge (1846–1932), Democratic alderman, congressman, diplomat, businessman and veteran of the Confederate States of America Army and Navy
- William Lee Cazort (1887–1969), former Lieutenant Governor of Arkansas, graduated from high school in Fort Smith
- W. H. H. Clayton (1840–1920), soldier, attorney, judge, justice of the Central District Court in Indian Territory; lived in Fort Smith 1873–1893, while serving under Judge Isaac Parker, before moving to McAlester, Oklahoma; buried in Fort Smith National Cemetery
- Mark Darr (born 1973), former Lieutenant Governor of Arkansas, was born in Fort Smith
- Jake Files (born 1972), state senator from Fort Smith since 2011; former member of the Arkansas House of Representatives
- William Meade Fishback (1831–1903) was a Democratic Governor of Arkansas and selected to be a member of the United States Senate but was not allowed to serve
- Charlene Fite (born 1950), educator in Fort Smith and Republican state representative from Crawford and Washington counties
- B. G. Hendrix (1922–2020), former state representative for Fort Smith
- John H. Holland (1857–1934), state representative and senator
- Asa Hutchinson (born 1950), Republican Governor of Arkansas from 2015 to 2023, former U.S. representative, Drug Enforcement Administration head, Under Secretary of Homeland Security, U.S. Senate nominee in 1986, and Arkansas gubernatorial nominee in 2006
- Carol Kelso (born 1945), former member of the Wisconsin State Assembly and Executive of Brown County, Wisconsin
- Marilyn Lloyd (1929–2018), Democratic Congresswoman from Tennessee's 3rd congressional district, 1975–1995; was born in Fort Smith
- George E. Nowotny (born 1932), Republican member of the Arkansas House of Representatives for Sebastian County from 1967 to 1972; resident of Tulsa, Oklahoma
- Carolyn Pollan (born 1937), former member of Arkansas House of Representatives, longest-serving Republican and longest-serving woman member of the chamber
- Isaac C. Parker (1838–1896), the "Hanging Judge"
- William L. Spicer (1918–1991), chairman of the Arkansas Republican Party from 1962 to 1964, who quarreled with Winthrop Rockefeller; owner of a chain of drive-in theaters

=== Other ===
- Benjamin Bonneville (1796–1878), explorer of the American West
- John R. Clarke, author and scientific director at the United States Navy Experimental Diving Unit
- Charles M. Cooke, Jr., World War II admiral, naval strategist, commander of the USS Pennsylvania during the attack at Pearl Harbor
- Max C. Currick (1877–1947), rabbi
- William O. Darby (1911–1945), heroic World War II general
- Alyse Eady (born 1988), Miss Arkansas, 2011 Miss America-first runner-up
- Kelly J. Ford, novelist
- Jeff Gillan (born 1957), journalist
- Ozro Thurston "O.T." Jones, Sr. (1891–1972), second senior bishop of the Church of God in Christ
- Mame Stewart Josenberger (c1870–1964), businesswoman and club leader in Fort Smith
- Madison Marsh (born 2001), second lieutenant in the U.S. Air Force, crowned as Miss Colorado 2023, and Miss America 2024
- Ralph O. Mott, architect
- E. Chester Nelson, architect
- Bass Reeves (1838–1910), thought to be one of the first African Americans to have received a commission as a U.S. Deputy Marshal west of the Mississippi River
- Roger Lee Steele (1945–2012), graphic artist/printmaker
- Cap Tilles (1865–1951), capitalist and philanthropist
- Frederick Hinde Zimmerman (1864–1924), businessman, and founder of the Grand Rapids Hotel

== Sister cities ==
Fort Smith has a sister city relationship with Cisterna di Latina, Italy, site of the World War II Battle of Cisterna, fought by United States Army Rangers commanded by Fort Smith native William Orlando Darby. The city also has a mutual friendship-city relationship with Jining, China.

- Cisterna di Latina, Italy – 1983
- Nago-Torbole, Italy
- Jining, Shandong, China

== See also ==
- List of cities and towns in Arkansas
