= KKBD =

Radio station in Sallisaw, Oklahoma (Fort Smith, Arkansas)

Coordinates: 35.407°N 94.691°W

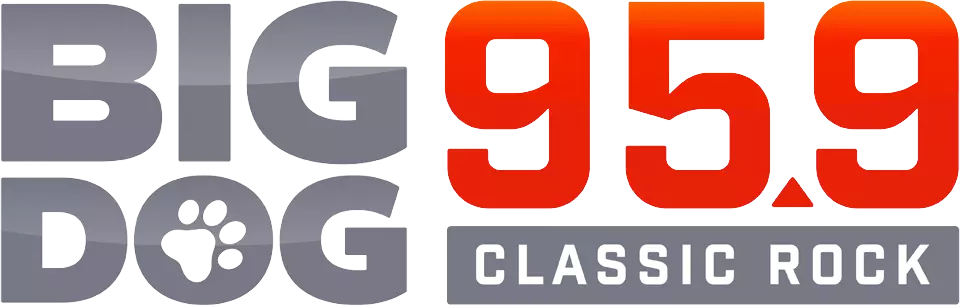
- Sallisaw, Oklahoma; United States
- Broadcast area: Fort Smith, Arkansas
- Frequency: 95.9 MHz
- Branding: Big Dog 95.9

Programming
- Format: Classic rock
- Affiliations: Westwood One

Ownership
- Owner: iHeartMedia, Inc.; (iHM Licenses, LLC)
- Sister stations: KMAG; KWHN; KZBB

History
- First air date: May 18, 1972 (as KRBB-FM)
- Former call signs: KRBB-FM (1972–1981); KAZZ (1981–1985); KKID-FM (1985–1993); KKUZ-FM (1993–1996); KMXJ (1996–1999)
- Call sign meaning: "Big Dog"

Technical information
- Licensing authority: FCC
- Facility ID: 26909
- Class: C2
- ERP: 30,000 watts
- HAAT: 90 meters (300 ft)

Links
- Public license information: Public file; LMS
- Webcast: Listen live (via iHeartRadio)
- Website: bigdog959.iheart.com

KKBD (95.9 FM) is a commercial radio station located in Sallisaw, Oklahoma, broadcasting to the Fort Smith, Arkansas, area. KKBD airs a classic rock music format branded as "Big Dog 95.9", and is owned by iHeartMedia.
