= KWHN =

Radio station in Fort Smith, Arkansas

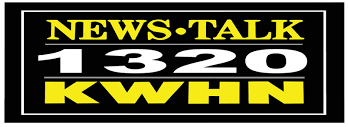
- Fort Smith, Arkansas; United States
- Frequency: 1320 kHz
- Branding: News Talk 1320 KWHN

Programming
- Format: News/talk
- Network: Fox News Radio
- Affiliations: Premiere Networks; Compass Media Networks; Westwood One

Ownership
- Owner: iHeartMedia, Inc.; (iHM Licenses, LLC)
- Sister stations: KKBD; KMAG; KZBB

History
- First air date: November 22, 1947
- Former call signs: KWHN (1947–2000); KYHN (2000–2008)

Technical information
- Licensing authority: FCC
- Facility ID: 22099
- Class: B
- Power: 5,000 watts

Links
- Public license information: Public file; LMS
- Webcast: Listen live (via iHeartRadio)
- Website: kwhn.iheart.com

KWHN (1320 AM) is a commercial radio station in Fort Smith, Arkansas, known as "News Talk 1320 KWHN". It airs a talk radio format and is owned by iHeartMedia, Inc. The studios and offices are on Lexington Avenue in Fort Smith.

KWHN transmits with 5,000 watts; by day, it has a non-directional signal, but at night, to protect other stations on 1320 AM, it uses a directional antenna with a four-tower array. The transmitter is off Plum Street in Fort Smith, near Interstate 540 and the Arkansas River.

== Programming ==
KWHN carries mostly nationally syndicated programming. Weekdays begin with Walton & Johnson from co-owned KPRC in Houston. They are followed by The Glenn Beck Radio Program, The Clay Travis and Buck Sexton Show, The Sean Hannity Show, The Mark Levin Show, The Ramsey Show with Dave Ramsey, Coast to Coast AM with George Noory and This Morning, America's First News with Gordon Deal.

Weekends feature repeats of weekday shows, as well as Kim Komando, The Weekend with Michael Brown, Gun Talk with Tom Gresham, Somewhere in Time with Art Bell and Sunday Night Live with Bill Cunningham. Most hours begin with world and national news from Fox News Radio.

== History ==
On November 22, 1947, KWHN signed on the air as the fourth radio station in Fort Smith, Arkansas. It was owned by the KWHN Broadcasting Company with studios at 421 Garrison Avenue. Allan Whiteside served as the president and general manager.

=== Expanded Band assignment ===
On March 17, 1997, the Federal Communications Commission (FCC) announced that 88 stations had been given permission to move to newly available "Expanded Band" transmitting frequencies, ranging from 1610 to 1700 kHz, with KWHN authorized to move from 1320 to 1650 kHz. On November 10, 1997, the new station on 1650 AM, also in Fort Smith, was assigned the call sign KHFS. The FCC's initial policy was that both the original station and its expanded band counterpart could operate simultaneously for up to five years, after which owners would have to turn in one of the two licenses, depending on whether they preferred the new assignment or elected to remain on the original frequency. However, this deadline has been extended multiple times, and both stations have remained authorized.

In 2000, the stations were acquired by Clear Channel Communications, forerunner to iHeartMedia. On November 22, 2000, the KWHN call sign was transferred from 1320 AM to 1650 AM, and the same day 1320 AM changed its call letters to KYHN. At this time, 1650 AM was simulcasting the 1320 AM programming.

In the spring of 2008, after extensive rain and flooding in western Arkansas, the transmitter site for 1650 AM suffered heavy water damage, and on April 2, 2008, that station filed a "Notification of Suspension of Operations/Request for Silent STA" with the FCC. The next day a call letter swap was made, with KWHN moving back to 1320 AM from 1650 AM after seven and one-half years, and KYHN transferred from 1320 AM to 1650 AM.

In 2010 Capstar TX LLC proposed including the silent KYHN on 1650 AM to be one of four stations to be transferred to MMTC (Minority Media and Telecommunications Council) Broadcasting LLC. However, this was in conflict with FCC's general policy that original AM band stations and their expanded band counterparts had to remain under common ownership. An exception to this policy was approved, on the grounds that "Capstar's donation of the facility to MMTC, which planned to use KYHN to train women and minority group members in broadcasting and broadcast management, advanced the diversity goals set forth in the pending proceeding Promoting Diversification of Ownership in the Broadcasting Services". Since then, the stations on 1320 AM and 1650 AM have had different owners.
