= ABB Motors and Mechanical =

Motor manufacturer

ABB Motors and Mechanical Inc.
- Industry: Manufacturing
- Founded: St. Louis, Missouri (1920)
- Headquarters: Fort Smith, Arkansas, United States
- Key people: Ron Tucker, CEO, President
- Products: Electric motors Mechanical Power Transmission; Industrial automation Generators
- Revenue: ▲US$1.52B (FY 2009)
- Operating income: ▲US$178M (FY 2009)
- Net income: ▲US$59.8M (FY 2009)
- Total assets: ▼US$2.65B (FY 2009)
- Total equity: ▲US$924M (FY 2009)
- Number of employees: 5500
- Website: www.baldor.com

As the US Motors and Generators Business Unit of ABB, ABB Motors and Mechanical Inc. markets, designs, manufactures, and provides service for industrial electric motors, generators and mechanical power transmission products. This business was formerly known as Baldor Electric Company until its company name was merged into ABB on March 1, 2018.

The US business unit, headquartered in Fort Smith, Arkansas, oversees 15 manufacturing locations in 8 states.

The company sells Baldor-Reliance and ABB branded industrial electric motors. Products are available in both IEC and NEMA configurations and range from fractional to 100,000 horsepower.

The company also sells the Dodge brand of mechanical power transmission products, including mounted bearings, enclosed gearing, couplings, sheaves, and bushings.

== History ==
Baldor Electric was founded in 1920 by Edwin Ballman and Emil Doerr. The name of the company was derived using part of each of their names. In 1967 the Company's headquarters were moved from St. Louis, Missouri to Fort Smith, Arkansas.

In 2007, Baldor Electric acquired the Dodge and Reliance Electric brands from Rockwell Automation for $1.8 billion. This more than doubled the size of the company, taking it from $800 million in annual revenue to $1.8 billion.

In 2011, Baldor was acquired by ABB Ltd of Switzerland in an all-cash deal of US$4.2 billion ($1.1 billion debt included). The company continued to operate as Baldor Electric Company A Member of the ABB Group.

On March 1, 2018, Baldor Electric Company's name was dissolved into the ABB brand, becoming ABB across all of its locations.

== Products ==
=== Industrial electric motors ===
- ABB and Baldor-Reliance brands
- DC
- AC Induction
- Grinders / Buffers
- DC Servo
- AC Servo
- Variable speed
- Industry specific solutions

=== Dodge bearings ===
- Mounted bearings
- Tapered roller bearings
- Spherical roller bearings
- Sleeve bearings
- Sleeveoil hydrodynamic bearings
- Take up frames

=== Dodge gear reducers ===
- Shaft mount helical
- Helical screw conveyor
- Right angle worm
- Helical inline
- Planetary
- Energy efficient gear motor / reducer

=== Dodge power transmission components ===
- Couplings
- Clutches
- Brakes
- Bushings
- Hubs
- Sheaves
- Pulleys
