= Central Mall (Fort Smith, Arkansas) =

Shopping mall in Fort Smith, Arkansas

- Location: Fort Smith, Arkansas
- Coordinates: 35.3668°N 94.3749°W
- Address: 5111 Rogers Avenue Fort Smith, Arkansas
- Opened: 1971
- Developer: Warmack Company
- Manager: Mason Asset Management
- Owner: Namdar Realty Group
- Num. of anchor tenants: 4 (2 open, 1 converted, 1 Demolished 1999)
- Floor area: 864,000 square feet
- Floors: 1 retail, 1 non-retail, 4 in Dillards including 2 non-retail floors, 2 in JC Penny including 1 non-retail floor.
- Public transit: Fort Smith Transit
- Website: centralmallfortsmith.com

Central Mall is a shopping mall located in Fort Smith, Arkansas. It opened in 1971 and was originally anchored by Dillard's, JCPenney, Sears, and The Boston Store; the latter of which was a locally owned department store that had moved to the site from their original downtown location when the mall opened. The former Sears anchor store has been converted into a local membership gym, and the former Boston Store was partially demolished and completely reconfigured during the remodel of 1999 to provide for an additional direct mall entrance, this original anchor location is unrecognizable today. The mall is owned and managed by Namdar Realty Group.

== History ==
Central Mall opened in 1971 and was developed by Warmack Company.

The mall underwent a major renovation in 1999, which included new flooring, skylights, interior finishes and site lighting, and an additional mall entrance where the former Boston Store anchor was located. Other improvements include a domed food court with an outside dining area, a seating capacity of 350, and a children's soft play area constructed in 2002.

On January 28, 2018, the mall lost one of its anchor tenants when Sears permanently closed.

In January 2020, it was announced that Namdar Realty Group and its subsidiary, Manson Asset Management, had acquired the Central Mall for $17 million.

As of May 2026, the retail areas of the mall are at approximately 70% occupancy with 25% of that being locally owned businesses. Much of the second level of the mall which is exclusively office space and workspace, and has not been remodeled since it was opened in 1971, is vacant today.
