= Fort Smith Transit =

- Headquarters: 6821 Jenny Lind Rd.
- Locale: Fort Smith, Arkansas
- Service area: Sebastian County, Arkansas
- Service type: Bus service
- Routes: 6
- Annual ridership: 205,460 (2022)
- Website: https://www.fortsmithar.gov/government/departments/transit

Fort Smith Transit is the primary provider of mass transportation in Sebastian County, Arkansas. Fixed routes are operated Monday through Saturday on an hourly schedule with two timed-transfer points. One additional route operates Monday through Friday and has a timed-transfer point with one other route.

All routes except Rogers-Supercenter and Zero Street converge on the Downtown Transfer Station and depart at the top of the hour. The two Rogers routes and the Grand route converge at 20 minutes after the hour at the Grand & Rogers Transfer Point near the intersection of Kinkead Ave and N 58th St. The Zero Street route meets the Towson route at 15 minutes after the hour near the intersection of Jenny Lind Rd. and Zero St. Transfers are free at designated transfer points with a transfer issued from the driver.

Demand-response and paratransit service is also provided, but must be scheduled at least one day ahead of time.

== Operations ==
=== Transfer Station ===
The Downtown Transfer Station at 200 Wheeler Avenue serves as the primary transfer point for the system. The $750,000 facility was designed by Guest Reddick Architects and broke ground in March 2009. Opening on December 30, 2009, the transfer station provided an immediate improvement for passengers with a 1,200 square foot indoor waiting area, benches, restrooms, and vending machines. On November 28, 2022, a canopy was opened to allow passengers to avoid inclement weather while boarding the bus. Simultaneously, the city introduced six new 35 and 40 foot CNG buses with more seating and USB charging ports to provide better service.

=== Routes ===
- Rogers - Downtown (DT)
- Rogers - Supercenter (SC)
- Midland
- Grand
- Towson
- Zero Street (No Saturday service)

=== Service Hours ===
- Fixed route: Monday through Saturday: 7:00 a.m. – 6:00 p.m. (Last downtown transfer at 5:00 p.m.)
- Demand-response: Monday through Friday 5:30 a.m. – 7:00 p.m.; Saturday 7:00 a.m. – 7:00 p.m.

=== Fares ===
- Fixed route: $1.25
- Demand-response: $2.50 ($3.00 outside of normal fixed route service hours)

=== Holidays ===
Fixed route service is not provided on the following holidays. Demand-response service may be available if scheduled ahead of time.

- New Years Day
- MLK Day
- Good Friday
- Memorial Day
- July 4
- Labor Day
- Veteran's Day
- Thanksgiving
- Christmas

== Fixed route ridership ==
The ridership statistics shown here are of fixed route services only and do not include demand response services.

== See also ==
- Ozark Regional Transit
- List of bus transit systems in the United States
