= KZBB =

Coordinates: 35.072°N 94.680°W

- Poteau, Oklahoma; United States
- Broadcast area: Fort Smith, Arkansas
- Frequency: 97.9 MHz
- Branding: B98

Programming
- Format: Hot adult contemporary
- Affiliations: Premiere Networks

Ownership
- Owner: iHeartMedia, Inc.; (iHM Licenses, LLC)
- Sister stations: KKBD, KMAG, KWHN

History
- First air date: 1967 (as KLCO-FM at 98.3)
- Former call signs: KLCO-FM (1967–1979); KLUP (1979–1984); KZZE (1984-86); KZZE-FM (4/1986-7/1986)
- Former frequencies: 98.3 MHz (1967–1975)
- Call sign meaning: Zebra (former brand)

Technical information
- Licensing authority: FCC
- Facility ID: 72715
- Class: C
- ERP: 100,000 watts
- HAAT: 610 meters (2,000 ft)

Links
- Public license information: Public file; LMS
- Webcast: Listen Live
- Website: kzbb.iheart.com

KZBB (97.9 FM) is a commercial radio station in Poteau, Oklahoma, broadcasting to the Fort Smith, Arkansas, area. KZBB airs a hot adult contemporary music format. Before it rebrand back to its B-98 name, it was known as The Zebra 97.9, and had a Mainstream Rock format beginning in the mid-1990s.

== History ==
KZBB is formerly known as "B-98", airing a CHR format beginning from 1986 until 1992. In 1992, the station became an adult contemporary format known as "Star 98", and then rock a few years later, initially as "Red Hot Radio 97.9, Star 98", and later as "Zebra 98." In October 1997, KZBB flipped back to Top 40 and rebranded back to its former "B98" name.
