= Hobart, Wisconsin =

- Village
- Location of Hobart in Brown County, Wisconsin.
- Coordinates: 44°30′49″N 88°8′35″W
- Country: United States
- State: Wisconsin
- County: Brown

Area
  - Total: 33.14 sq mi (85.83 km^{2})
  - Land: 33.02 sq mi (85.53 km^{2})
  - Water: 0.12 sq mi (0.31 km^{2})
- Elevation: 676 ft (206 m)

Population (2020)
  - Total: 10,211
  - Density: 309.2/sq mi (119.4/km^{2})
- Time zone: UTC-6 (Central (CST))
  - Summer (DST): UTC-5 (CDT)
- Area code: 920
- FIPS code: 55-35150
- GNIS feature ID: 2013444
- Website: www.hobartwi.gov

Hobart is a village in Brown County in the U.S. state of Wisconsin. The population was 10,211 at the 2020 census. It is a suburb of Green Bay and is part of the Green Bay Metropolitan Statistical Area. The village is located entirely within the treaty boundaries of the Oneida Nation of Wisconsin.

== History ==
On May 13, 2002, the Town of Hobart incorporated as a village. Hobart is named for Episcopal Bishop John Henry Hobart of New York who sent missionaries to the Oneida people and ministered to them after removal from New York to Wisconsin.

== Tribal relations ==
Hobart's local political scene has been characterized by numerous clashes with the Oneida Nation regarding their sovereignty over the reservation land on which Hobart sits. In 2008, a federal judge upheld restrictive property covenants added to deeds by the Village of Hobart to prevent transfer of certain reservation properties into Oneida federal trust land. In 2010, the village denied a liquor license to an Oneida business on the grounds that the tribe had not paid over $100,000 in stormwater fees for parcels held in tribal trust land; the tribe held that the village had no jurisdiction to charge such fees on tribal trust land. The federal court ruled in favor of the Oneida, and the village's appeal was not taken up by the US Supreme Court.

In 2016, the village of Hobart fined the tribe for holding their annual Big Apple Fest on Oneida-owned non-trust land, without first obtaining a village permit. The Oneida Nation sued Hobart in US District Court, and appealed the initial ruling in favor of the village. In 2020, the U.S. 7th Circuit Court of Appeals reversed the ruling in the wake of the landmark McGirt v. Oklahoma decision, holding that the tribe had the right to hold its annual event whether or not it received a permit from the village. Public records indicate that in the nine-year period from 2011–2020, Hobart spent nearly $1,000,000 in litigation costs for these court cases.

== Geography ==
According to the United States Census Bureau, the village has a total area of 33.06 square miles (85.63 km^{2}), of which 32.95 square miles (85.34 km^{2}) is land and 0.11 square miles (0.28 km^{2}) is water.

== Demographics ==
Historical population
Census	Pop.	Note	%±
2000	5,090		—
2010	6,182		21.5%
2020	10,211		65.2%
U.S. Decennial Census

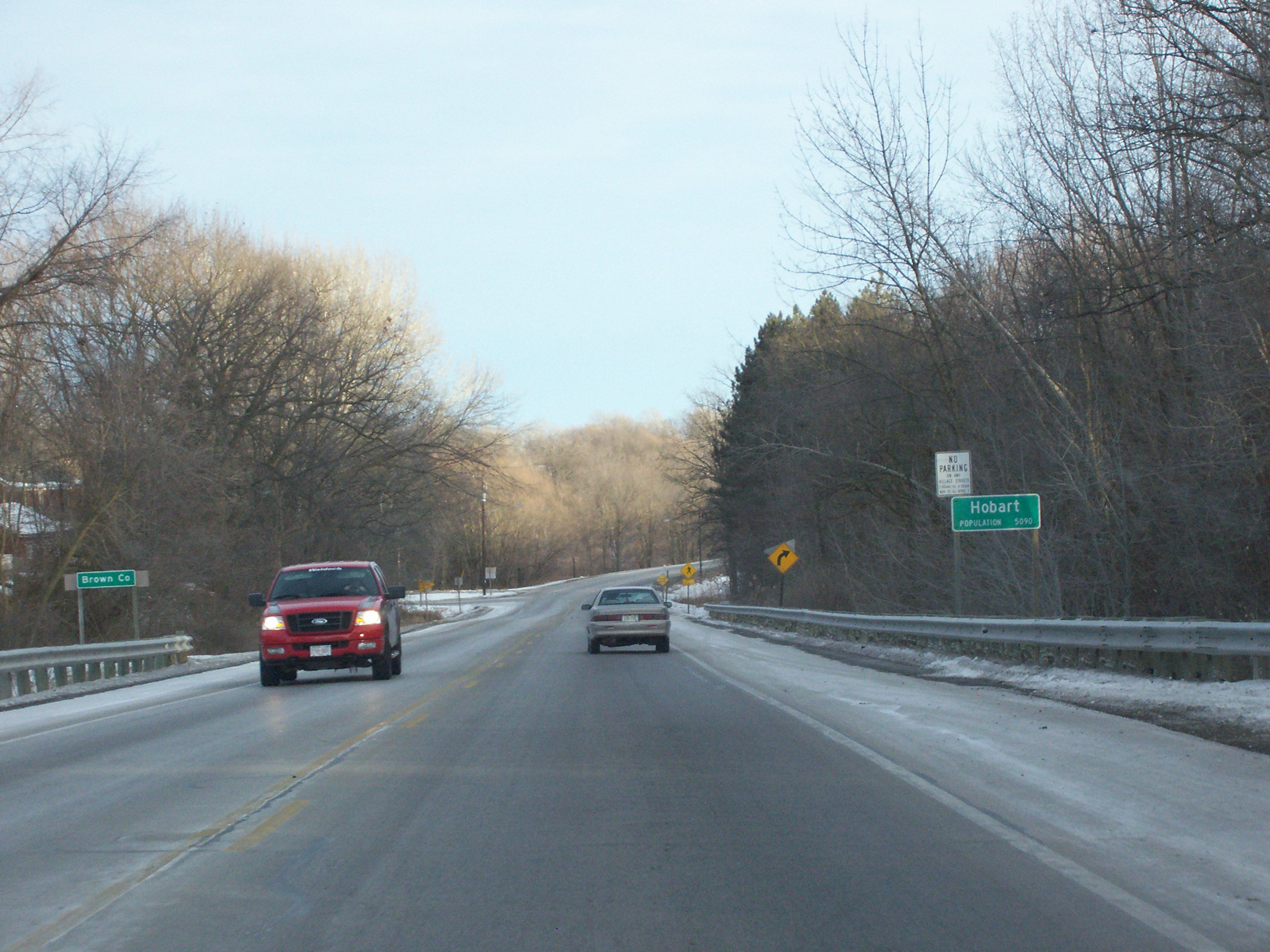
DOT sign for Hobart

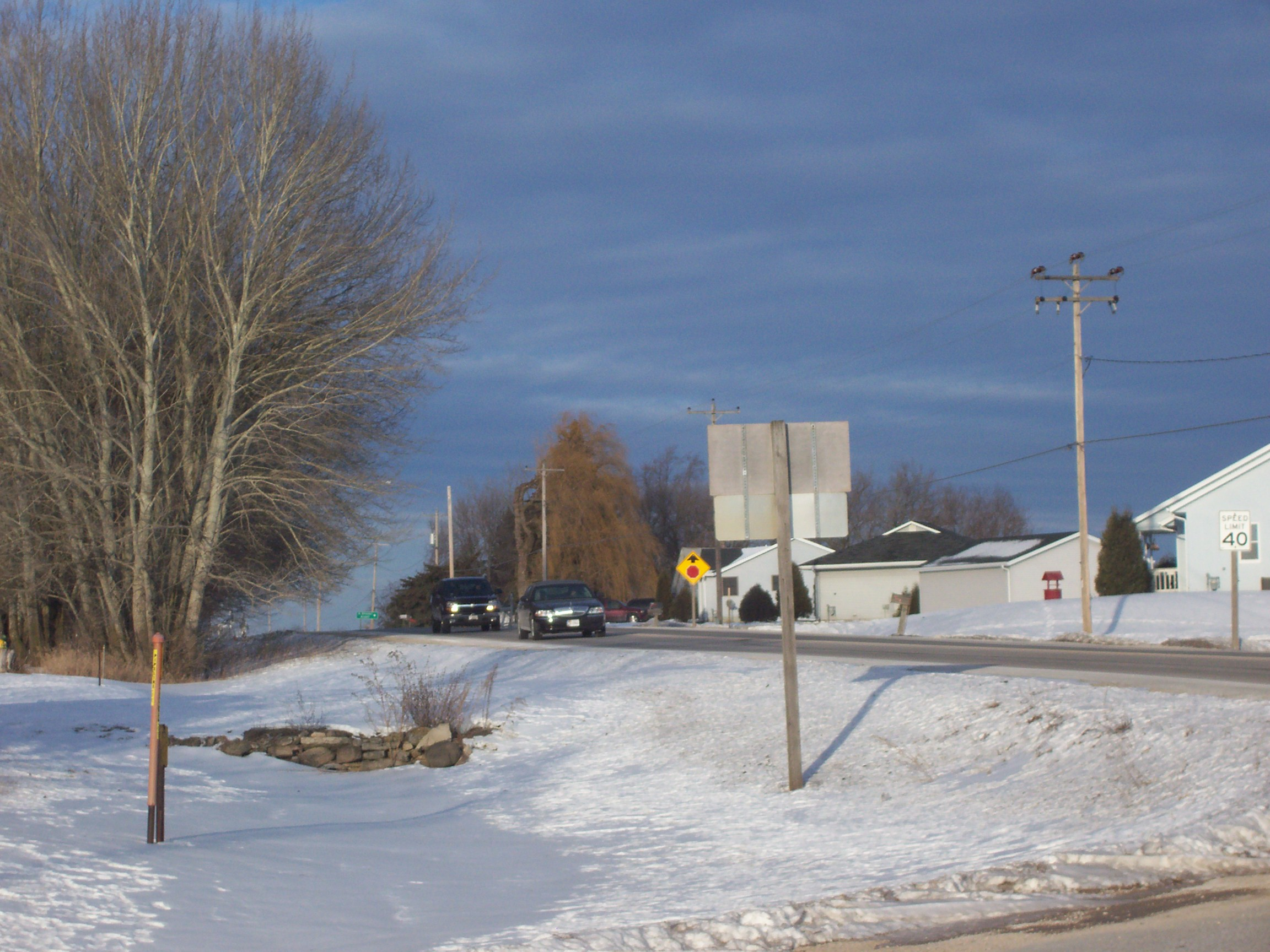
Several houses in Hobart

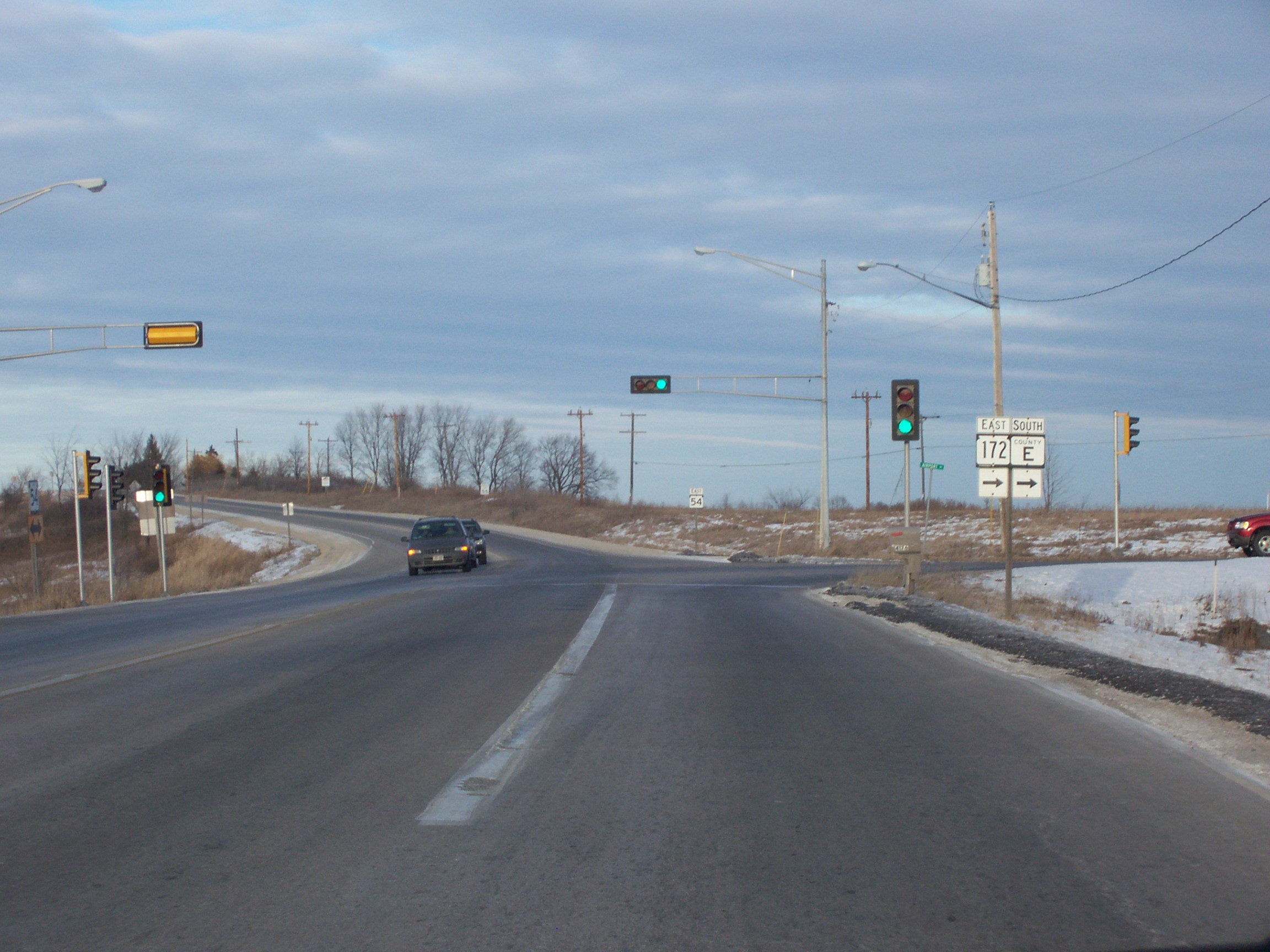
Intersection of Wisconsin Highway 54 and Wisconsin Highway 172

=== 2020 census ===
As of the 2020 census, Hobart had a population of 10,211. The median age was 37.6 years. 23.7% of residents were under the age of 18 and 16.6% of residents were 65 years of age or older. For every 100 females there were 96.9 males, and for every 100 females age 18 and over there were 95.2 males age 18 and over.

59.5% of residents lived in urban areas, while 40.5% lived in rural areas.

There were 4,029 households in Hobart, of which 31.5% had children under the age of 18 living in them. Of all households, 55.2% were married-couple households, 14.2% were households with a male householder and no spouse or partner present, and 21.9% were households with a female householder and no spouse or partner present. About 23.9% of all households were made up of individuals and 8.3% had someone living alone who was 65 years of age or older.

There were 4,259 housing units, of which 5.4% were vacant. The homeowner vacancy rate was 0.5% and the rental vacancy rate was 8.0%.

Racial composition as of the 2020 census
Race	Number	Percent
White	7,987	78.2%
Black or African American	63	0.6%
American Indian and Alaska Native	1,241	12.2%
Asian	335	3.3%
Native Hawaiian and Other Pacific Islander	5	0.0%
Some other race	69	0.7%
Two or more races	511	5.0%
Hispanic or Latino (of any race)	359	3.5%

=== 2010 census ===
As of the census of 2010, there were 6,182 people, 2,180 households, and 1,828 families living in the village. The population density was 187.6 inhabitants per square mile (72.4/km^{2}). There were 2,275 housing units at an average density of 69.0 per square mile (26.6/km^{2}). The racial makeup of the village was 78.1% White, 0.5% African American, 17.5% Native American, 1.2% Asian, 0.1% Pacific Islander, 0.1% from other races, and 2.5% from two or more races. Hispanic or Latino of any race were 2.3% of the population.

There were 2,180 households, of which 37.0% had children under the age of 18 living with them, 72.2% were married couples living together, 7.6% had a female householder with no husband present, 4.1% had a male householder with no wife present, and 16.1% were non-families. 12.8% of all households were made up of individuals, and 5.5% had someone living alone who was 65 years of age or older. The average household size was 2.84 and the average family size was 3.08.

The median age in the village was 43.4 years. 27.1% of residents were under the age of 18; 6.4% were between the ages of 18 and 24; 19% were from 25 to 44; 34.9% were from 45 to 64; and 12.8% were 65 years of age or older. The gender makeup of the village was 49.2% male and 50.8% female.

=== 2000 census ===
As of the census of 2000, there were 5,090 people, 1,717 households, and 1,468 families living in the village. The population density was 153.5 people per square mile (59.3/km^{2}). There were 1,758 housing units at an average density of 53.0 per square mile (20.5/km^{2}). The racial makeup of the village was 80.57% White, 0.10% African American, 16.66% Native American, 0.69% Asian, 0.08% Pacific Islander, 0.39% from other races, and 1.51% from two or more races. Hispanic or Latino of any race were 0.86% of the population.

There were 1,717 households, out of which 40.8% had children under the age of 18 living with them, 75.4% were married couples living together, 6.5% had a female householder with no husband present, and 14.5% were non-families. 10.7% of all households were made up of individuals, and 4.6% had someone living alone who was 65 years of age or older. The average household size was 2.96 and the average family size was 3.20.

In the village, the population was spread out, with 29.8% under the age of 18, 5.8% from 18 to 24, 25.7% from 25 to 44, 31.2% from 45 to 64, and 7.5% who were 65 years of age or older. The median age was 39 years. For every 100 females, there were 96.8 males. For every 100 females age 18 and over, there were 96.4 males.

The median income for a household in the village was $69,034, and the median income for a family was $76,626. Males had a median income of $49,813 versus $30,458 for females. The per capita income for the village was $29,059. About 4.1% of families and 6.5% of the population were below the poverty line, including 9.6% of those under age 18 and 10.6% of those age 65 or over.

== Education ==
Hobart is divided between West De Pere School District and Pulaski Community School District.
