= Brown County, Wisconsin =

County in Wisconsin, United States

- County
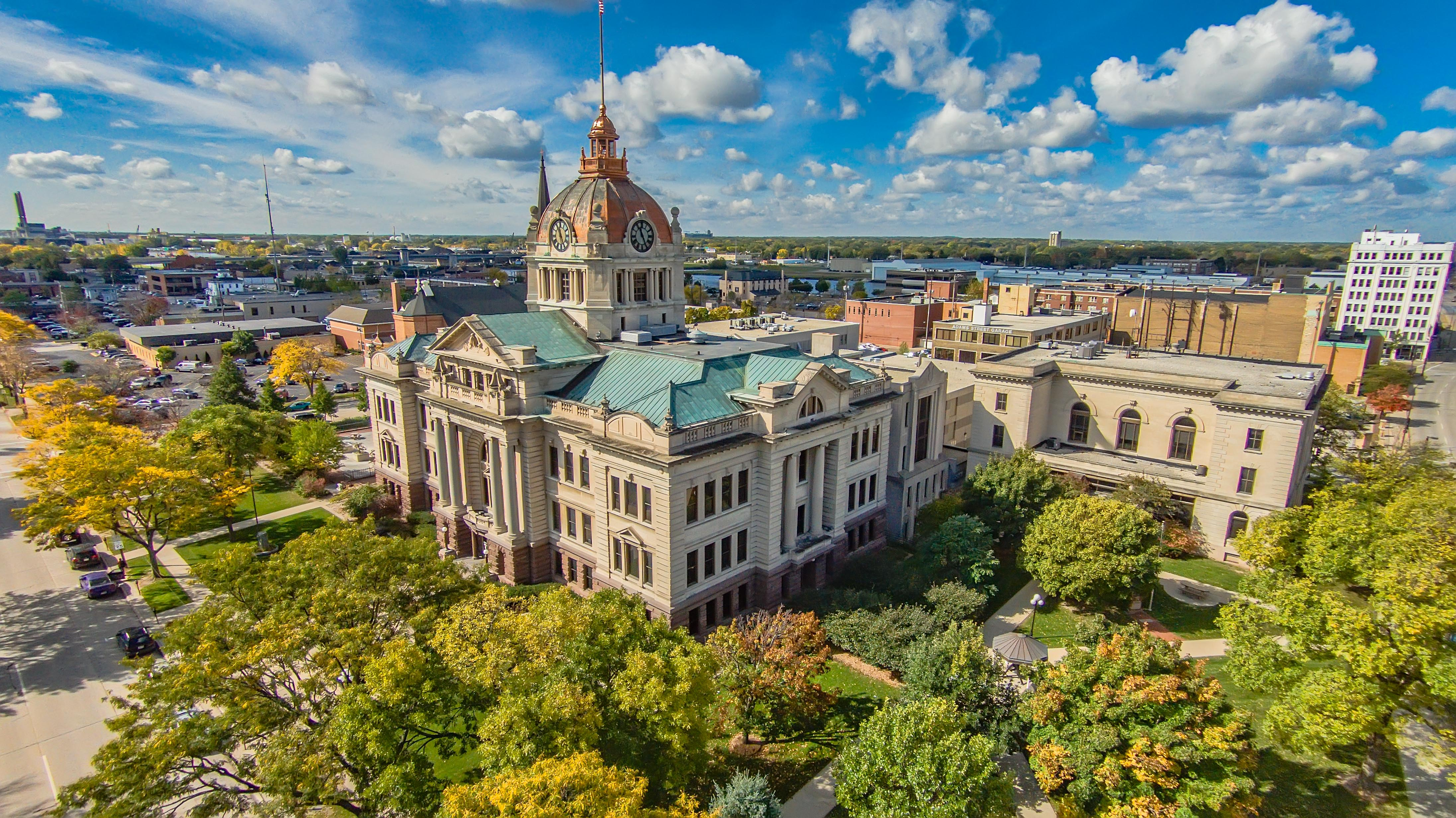
- Brown County Courthouse in Green Bay

- Location within the U.S. state of Wisconsin
- Coordinates: 44°29′N 87°59′W
- Country: United States
- State: Wisconsin
- Founded: 1818
- Named for: Jacob Brown
- Seat: Green Bay
- Largest city: Green Bay

Area
  - Total: 616 sq mi (1,600 km^{2})
  - Land: 530 sq mi (1,400 km^{2})
  - Water: 86 sq mi (220 km^{2}) 14%

Population (2020)
  - Total: 268,740
  - Estimate (2025): 275,803 ▲
  - Density: 510/sq mi (200/km^{2})
- Time zone: UTC−6 (Central)
  - Summer (DST): UTC−5 (CDT)
- Congressional district: 8th
- Website: www.browncountywi.gov

Brown County is a county in the U.S. state of Wisconsin. As of the 2020 census, the population was 268,740, making it the fourth-most populous county in Wisconsin. The county seat is Green Bay. Brown County is part of the Green Bay metropolitan area.

== History ==
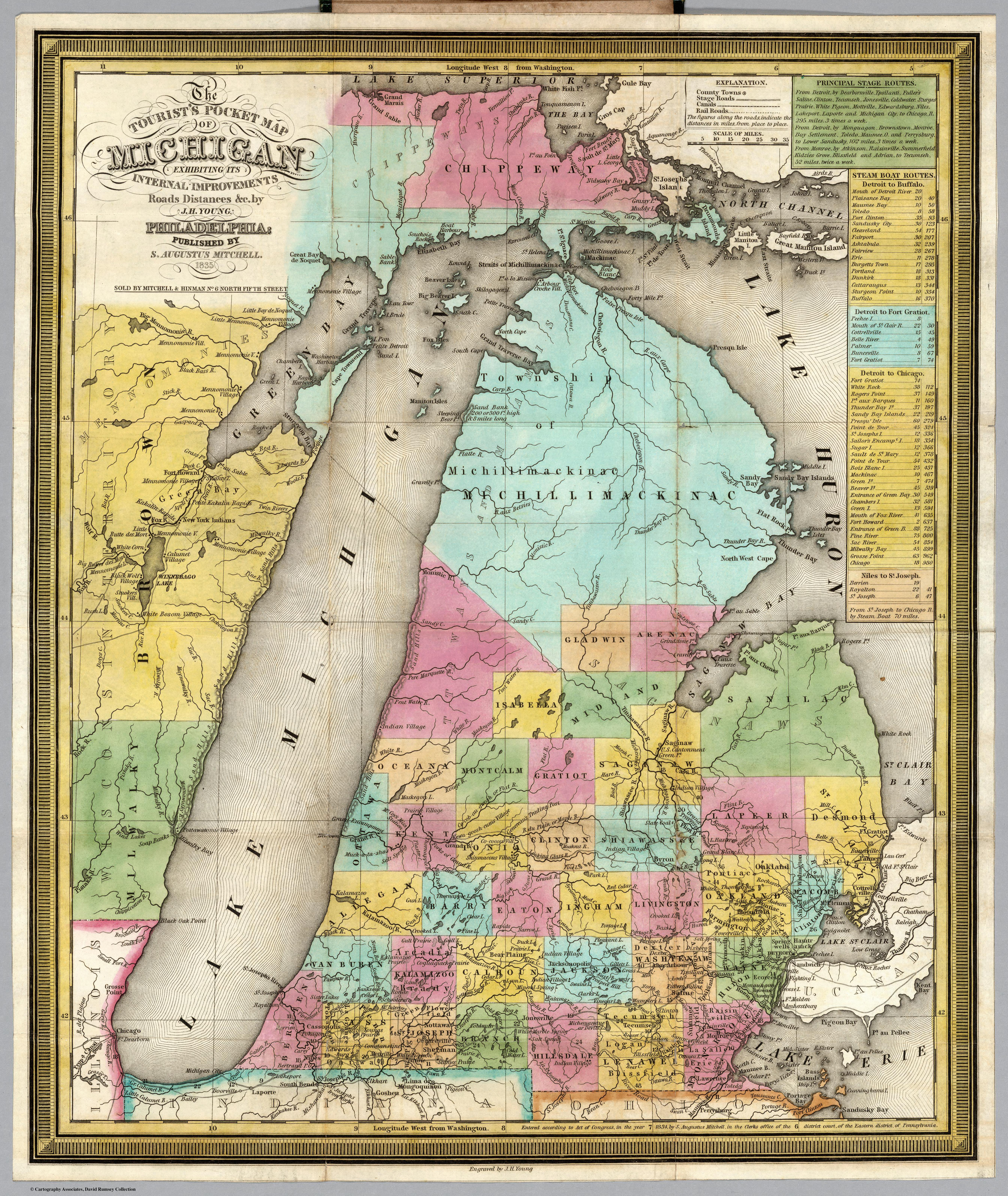
Wisconsin Territory depicted on this 1835 Tourist's Pocket Map Of Michigan, showing a Menominee-filled Brown County, Wisconsin that spans the northern half of the territory.

Brown County is one of Wisconsin's two original counties, along with Crawford County. It originally spanned the entire eastern half of the state when formed by the Michigan Territorial legislature in 1818. It was named for Major General Jacob Brown, a military leader during the War of 1812.

Several towns along the Fox River vied for the position of county seat in Brown County's early years. The first county seat was located at Menomoneeville (now a part of Allouez) in 1824. In 1837, a public referendum relocated the county seat to De Pere. The location was put up for the popular vote again in 1854, resulting in the establishment of the present county seat at Green Bay.

The oldest known tree in Wisconsin, a 1,300-year-old cedar growing on the Niagara Escarpment, was found in Brown County.

== Geography ==
According to the U.S. Census Bureau, the county has a total area of 616 square miles (1,600 km^{2}), of which 530 square miles (1,400 km^{2}) is land and 86 square miles (220 km^{2}) (14%) is water.

=== Major highways ===
- Interstate 41
- Interstate 43
- U.S. Highway 41
- U.S. Highway 141
- Highway 29
- Highway 32
- Highway 54
- Highway 57
- Highway 96
- Highway 160
- Highway 172

=== Railroads ===
- Watco
- Canadian National
- Escanaba and Lake Superior Railroad

=== Buses ===
- Green Bay Metro

== Climate ==
Brown County

Climate chart (precipitation, max. and min. temperature)
J	F	M	A	M	J	J	A	S	O	N	D
62 −8 −13	62 −6 −11	66 1 −8	141 16 1	105 20 7	106 24 14	108 28 16	88 27 15	72 22 12	121 12 5	68 5 −2	61 −5 −11
- █ Average max. and min. temperatures in °C
- █ Precipitation totals in mm
Imperial conversion
J	F	M	A	M	J	J	A	S	O	N	D
2.4 18 9	2.4 21 12	2.6 34 18	5.6 61 34	4.1 68 45	4.2 75 57	4.3 82 61	3.5 81 59	2.8 72 54	4.8 54 41	2.7 41 28	2.4 23 12
- █ Average max. and min. temperatures in °F
- █ Precipitation totals in inches

== Demographics ==
Historical population
Census	Pop.	Note	%±
1840	2,107		—
1850	6,215		195.0%
1860	11,795		89.8%
1870	25,168		113.4%
1880	34,078		35.4%
1890	39,164		14.9%
1900	46,359		18.4%
1910	54,098		16.7%
1920	61,889		14.4%
1930	70,249		13.5%
1940	83,109		18.3%
1950	98,314		18.3%
1960	125,082		27.2%
1970	158,244		26.5%
1980	175,280		10.8%
1990	194,594		11.0%
2000	226,778		16.5%
2010	248,007		9.4%
2020	268,740		8.4%
2025 (est.)	275,803	▲	2.6%
U.S. Decennial Census; 1790–1960 1900–1990; 1990–2000 2010–2020

=== Birth related statistics ===
In 2017, there were 3,324 births, giving a general fertility rate of 65.6 births per 1000 women aged 15–44, which is above the Wisconsin average of 60.1. Additionally, there were 168 reported induced abortions performed on women of Brown County residence, with a rate of 3.3 abortions per 1000 women aged 15–44, which is below the Wisconsin average rate of 5.2.

=== Racial and ethnic composition ===
Brown County, Wisconsin – Racial and ethnic composition Note: the US Census treats Hispanic/Latino as an ethnic category. This table excludes Latinos from the racial categories and assigns them to a separate category. Hispanics/Latinos may be of any race.
Race / ethnicity (NH = Non-Hispanic)	Pop 1980	Pop 1990	Pop 2000	Pop 2010	Pop 2020	% 1980	% 1990	% 2000	% 2010	% 2020
White alone (NH)	170,605	185,869	203,243	207,702	208,440	97.33%	95.52%	89.62%	83.75%	77.56%
Black or African American alone (NH)	497	992	2,562	5,286	8,154	0.28%	0.51%	1.13%	2.13%	3.03%
Native American or Alaska Native alone (NH)	2,434	3,676	4,858	5,968	6,329	1.39%	1.89%	2.14%	2.41%	2.36%
Asian alone (NH)	568	2,493	4,910	6,657	8,445	0.32%	1.28%	2.17%	2.68%	3.14%
Native Hawaiian or Pacific Islander alone (NH)	x	x	58	88	114	x	x	0.03%	0.04%	0.04%
Other race alone (NH)	270	39	97	175	637	0.15%	0.02%	0.04%	0.07%	0.24%
Mixed race or Multiracial (NH)	x	x	2,352	4,146	10,405	x	x	1.04%	1.67%	3.87%
Hispanic or Latino (any race)	906	1,525	8,698	17,985	26,216	0.52%	0.78%	3.84%	7.25%	9.76%
Total	175,280	194,594	226,778	248,007	268,740	100.00%	100.00%	100.00%	100.00%	100.00%

=== 2020 census ===
As of the 2020 census, the county had a population of 268,740, the median age was 37.9 years, 23.3% of residents were under the age of 18, and 15.7% were 65 years of age or older. For every 100 females there were 98.4 males, and for every 100 females age 18 and over there were 96.7 males age 18 and over.

The population density was 507.0 people per square mile (195.8 people/km^{2}). There were 112,908 housing units at an average density of 213.0 units per square mile (82.2 units/km^{2}).

The racial makeup of the county was 79.2% White, 3.1% Black or African American, 2.8% American Indian and Alaska Native, 3.2% Asian, <0.1% Native Hawaiian and Pacific Islander, 4.4% from other races, and 7.2% from two or more races. Hispanic or Latino residents of any race comprised 9.8% of the population.

There were 108,156 households in the county, of which 29.6% had children under the age of 18 living in them. Of all households, 47.8% were married-couple households, 18.7% were households with a male householder and no spouse or partner present, and 24.8% were households with a female householder and no spouse or partner present. About 29.4% of all households were made up of individuals and 11.1% had someone living alone who was 65 years of age or older.

Of the 112,908 housing units, 4.2% were vacant. Among occupied housing units, 64.3% were owner-occupied and 35.7% were renter-occupied. The homeowner vacancy rate was 0.9% and the rental vacancy rate was 4.5%.

83.4% of residents lived in urban areas, while 16.6% lived in rural areas.

=== 2010 census ===
At the 2010 census there were 248,007 people, 98,383 households, and 63,721 families living in the county. The population density was 403 people per square mile (156 people/km^{2}). There were 104,371 housing units at an average density of 170 units per square mile (66 units/km^{2}). The racial makeup of the county was 86.5% White, 2.2% Black or African American, 2.7% Native American, 2.7% Asian, 0.0004% Pacific Islander, 3.7% from other races, and 2.2% from two or more races. 7.3% of the population were Hispanic or Latino of any race. Of the 98,383 households 31.0% had children under the age of 18 living with them, 50.0% were married couples living together, 10.2% had a female householder with no husband present, and 35.2% were non-families. 27.7% of households were one person and 8.9% were one person aged 65 or older. The average household size was 2.45 and the average family size was 3.02.

The age distribution was 24.1% under the age of 18, 10.8% from 18 to 24, 26.9% from 25 to 44, 26.6% from 45 to 64, and 11.6% 65 or older. The median age was 36.2 years. For every 100 females, there were 97.80 males. For every 100 females age 18 and over, there were 95.70 males.

=== 2000 census ===
2000 Census Age Pyramid for Brown County

At the 2000 census there were 226,778 people, 87,295 households, and 57,527 families living in the county. The population density was 429 people per square mile (166 people/km^{2}). There were 90,199 housing units at an average density of 171 units per square mile (66 units/km^{2}). The racial makeup of the county was 91.14% White, 1.16% Black or African American, 2.29% Native American, 2.18% Asian, 0.03% Pacific Islander, 1.90% from other races, and 1.30% from two or more races. 3.84% of the population were Hispanic or Latino of any race. 33.8% were of German, 8.9% Polish, 7.8% Belgian and 6.8% Irish ancestry. 93.2% spoke only English at home, 3.8% spoke Spanish and 1.2% Hmong. Of the 87,295 households 33.90% had children under the age of 18 living with them, 53.20% were married couples living together, 8.90% had a female householder with no husband present, and 34.10% were non-families. 26.50% of households were one person and 8.40% were one person aged 65 or older. The average household size was 2.51 and the average family size was 3.08.

The age distribution was 26.10% under the age of 18, 10.50% from 18 to 24, 31.90% from 25 to 44, 20.90% from 45 to 64, and 10.70% 65 or older. The median age was 34 years. For every 100 females, there were 98.90 males. For every 100 females age 18 and over, there were 96.90 males.

== Government ==
The legislative branch of Brown County is the 26-member Board of Supervisors. Each member represents a single district and serves a two-year term, with elections held in the spring of even-numbered years. The Board of Supervisors elects a chairman and Vice Chairman from its membership.

The executive branch of Brown County is the County Executive, who is elected in the spring of every other odd-numbered year. The executive appoints department heads with the approval of the County Board. The current county executive is Troy Streckenbach.

Brown County has several other elected officials that are established under the Wisconsin State constitution and are referred to as the "constitutional officers". Constitutional officers are the only partisan elected officials within Brown County government, as the Executive and County Board are non-partisan positions.

The current constitutional officers are:

- County Executive: Troy Streckenbach (Independent)
- Clerk: Sandy Juno (R)
- Clerk of Circuit Courts: John Vander Leest (R)
- District Attorney: David L. Lasee (R)
- Register of Deeds: Cheryl Berken (R)
- Sheriff: Todd Delain (R)
- Treasurer: Paul Zeller (R)

In July 2002, the county declared English its official language, voting 17–8 to do so and to increase spending to promote fluency in English.

Brown County Executives
Name	Term start	Term end	Elected
Don Holloway	1971	1987	1971, 1975, 1979, 1983 (defeated 1987)
Thomas Cuene	1987	1995 (Note: Cuene resigned on June 2, 1995.)	1987, 1991, 1995
Guy Zima (acting)	1995	1995	Succeeded upon Cuene's resignation and served until Holloway's appointment as interim County Executive was confirmed by the County Board.
Don Holloway (interim)	1995	1995	Appointed as interim County Executive by Zima
Nancy Nusbaum	1995	2003	1995 (special), 1999
Carol Kelso	2003	2007	2003
Tom Hinz	2007	2011	2007
Troy Streckenbach	2011	incumbent	2015, 2019, 2023

== Communities ==
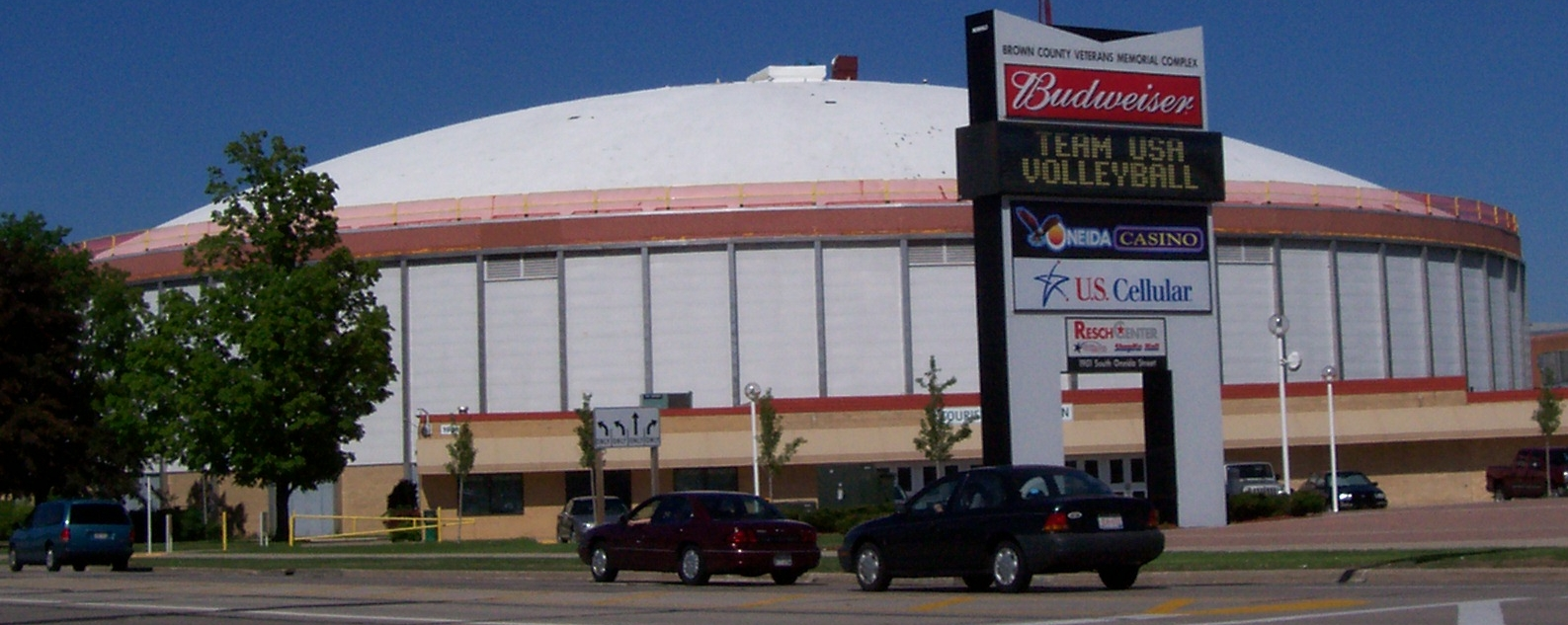
Brown County Veterans Memorial Arena

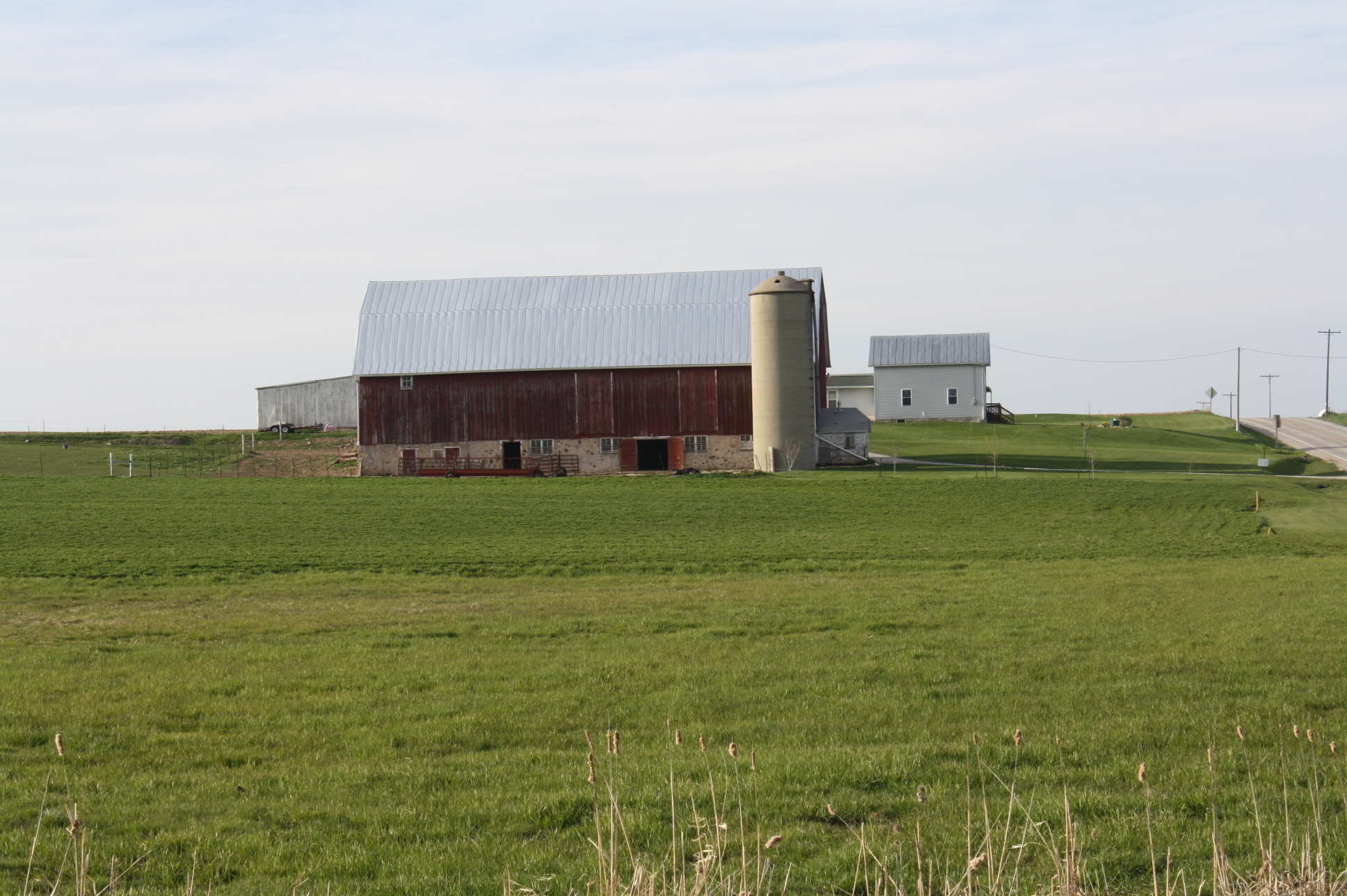
Farmland in rural Brown County

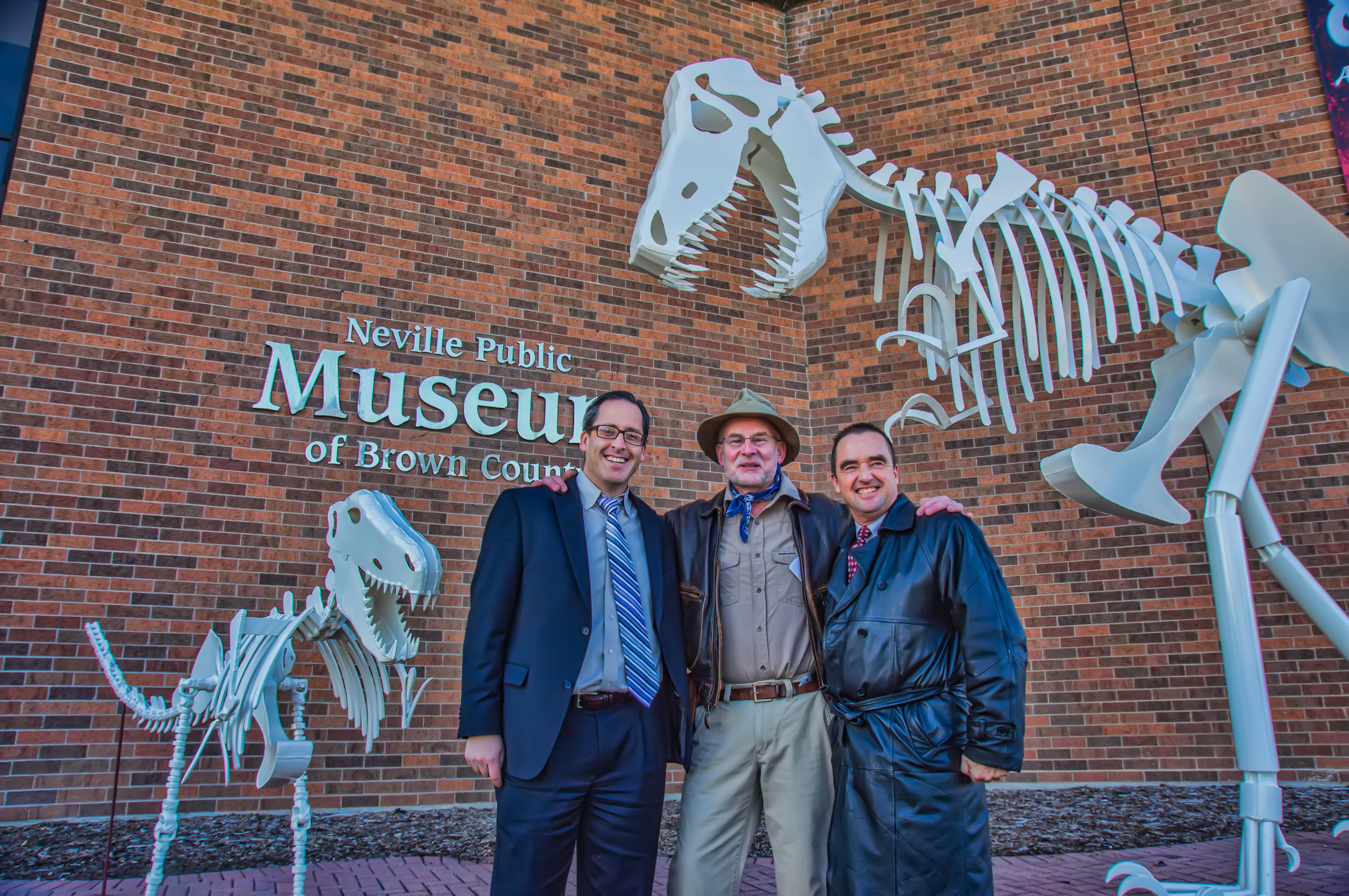
The County Executive Troy Streckenbach, Brown County Neville Museum Director, and Mayor Jim Schmitt of Green Bay in front of the dinosaur sculpture.

=== Cities ===
- De Pere
- Green Bay (county seat)

=== Villages ===
- Allouez
- Ashwaubenon
- Bellevue
- Denmark
- Greenleaf
- Hobart
- Howard (partly in Outagamie County)
- Pulaski (partly in Shawano County and Oconto County)
- Suamico
- Wrightstown (partly in Outagamie County)

=== Towns ===
- Eaton
- Glenmore
- Green Bay (town)
- Holland
- Humboldt
- Lawrence
- Ledgeview
- Morrison
- New Denmark
- Pittsfield
- Rockland
- Scott
- Wrightstown

=== Census-designated places ===
- Dyckesville

=== Unincorporated communities ===
- Anston
- Askeaton
- Bay Settlement
- Benderville
- Buckman
- Champion
- Coppens Corner
- Edgewater Beach
- Fontenoy
- Henrysville
- Hollandtown
- Kolb
- Kunesh
- Langes Corners
- Lark
- Little Rapids
- Mill Center
- Morrison
- New Franken
- Pine Grove
- Pittsfield (partial)
- Poland
- Red Banks
- Shirley
- Sniderville (partial)
- Sugar Bush
- Wayside
- Wequiock

=== Native American communities ===
- Oneida Nation of Wisconsin (partial)

=== Ghost towns/Neighborhoods ===
- Fort Howard
- Preble

== Adjacent counties ==
- Oconto County – north
- Door County – northeast, shares a short water border within Green Bay
- Kewaunee County – east
- Manitowoc County – southeast
- Calumet County – southwest
- Outagamie County – west
- Shawano County – northwest

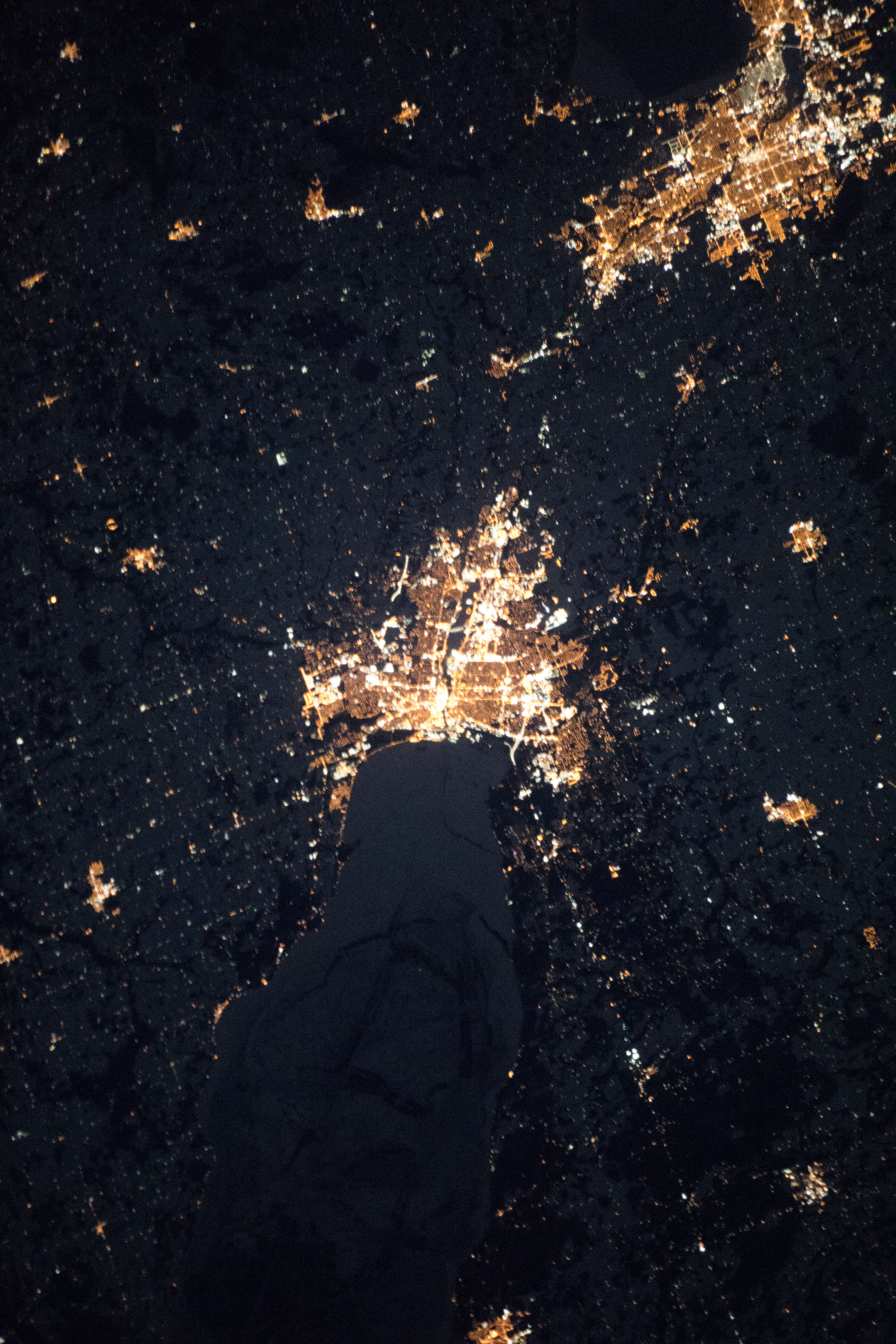
Brown County and adjacent counties, in the early morning of January 1, 2018, taken from the International Space Station

Green Bay, center, is the seat of Brown County. The city of Oconto (half cut off at the bottom right) is the county seat of Oconto County. Slightly above and much further right of Oconto is Oconto Falls, also in Oconto County. The somewhat larger city above Oconto Falls is Pulaski, which is in Brown County at the very border with Shawano County. Shawano County extends between Pulaski and past the edge of the photograph.

The large city in the top right is Appleton, the county seat of Outagamie County. To the left of Appleton and across the northern edge of Lake Winnebago is Brillion in Calumet County.

The village directly to the left of Green Bay and its immediate suburbs is Denmark, in Brown County. The smaller communities above and slightly to the left of Denmark (including Cooperstown, Maribel, and Kellnersville) are in Manitowoc County.

Luxembourg (larger village in lower left) and Casco (half cut off at lower far left) are in Kewaunee County.

== Politics ==
Brown County is rather conservative for an urban county. Since 1968, Brown County has voted for the Republican presidential candidate in all but two elections, 1996 and 2008. Democratic strength is concentrated in the city of Green Bay, while the suburban and rural areas typically vote Republican.

United States presidential election results for Brown County, Wisconsin
Year	Republican		Democratic		Third party(ies)	
Year	No.	%	No.	%	No.	%
1892	2,855	42.41%	3,653	54.26%	224	3.33%
1896	5,436	57.51%	3,841	40.64%	175	1.85%
1900	4,934	56.80%	3,588	41.30%	165	1.90%
1904	6,027	65.84%	2,667	29.13%	460	5.03%
1908	4,947	55.25%	3,354	37.46%	653	7.29%
1912	2,764	32.76%	3,557	42.16%	2,116	25.08%
1916	4,132	40.02%	5,771	55.90%	421	4.08%
1920	8,845	61.66%	3,877	27.03%	1,623	11.31%
1924	7,611	37.90%	2,328	11.59%	10,141	50.50%
1928	9,371	36.04%	16,465	63.32%	168	0.65%
1932	7,150	25.87%	19,990	72.34%	494	1.79%
1936	8,433	27.14%	21,417	68.92%	1,227	3.95%
1940	16,379	45.45%	19,526	54.18%	135	0.37%
1944	17,762	50.14%	17,576	49.61%	88	0.25%
1948	17,729	48.50%	18,449	50.47%	380	1.04%
1952	30,400	67.80%	14,342	31.99%	94	0.21%
1956	32,878	70.24%	13,642	29.14%	288	0.62%
1960	26,329	49.72%	26,577	50.19%	46	0.09%
1964	21,134	40.59%	30,851	59.26%	79	0.15%
1968	30,133	53.67%	21,615	38.50%	4,395	7.83%
1972	37,101	56.49%	26,511	40.37%	2,063	3.14%
1976	36,571	50.62%	33,572	46.47%	2,100	2.91%
1980	47,067	56.72%	29,796	35.91%	6,114	7.37%
1984	51,202	62.44%	30,218	36.85%	583	0.71%
1988	43,625	50.75%	41,788	48.62%	540	0.63%
1992	42,352	41.24%	37,513	36.53%	22,836	22.24%
1996	38,563	42.45%	42,823	47.14%	9,451	10.40%
2000	54,258	50.35%	49,096	45.56%	4,415	4.10%
2004	67,173	54.48%	54,935	44.56%	1,186	0.96%
2008	55,854	44.77%	67,269	53.92%	1,631	1.31%
2012	64,836	50.29%	62,526	48.50%	1,566	1.21%
2016	67,210	52.10%	53,382	41.38%	8,419	6.53%
2020	75,871	52.68%	65,511	45.49%	2,635	1.83%
2024	79,132	52.99%	67,937	45.49%	2,264	1.52%

=== Political representation ===
The current Wisconsin Legislative districts were defined in the law 2023 Wisconsin Act 94, passed by the legislature and signed by the Governor in February 2024. The current congressional districts were defined by the Wisconsin Supreme Court decision Johnson v. Wisconsin Elections Commission in April 2022.

For representation in the U.S. House of Representatives, Brown County falls entirely within Wisconsin's 8th congressional district, currently represented by Republican Tony Wied, since November 2024.

In the Wisconsin Senate, Brown County fully contains one Senate district (the 30th), and makes up a portion of two other districts (the 1st and 2nd).

- the 1st Senate district contains the rural eastern and southern parts of Brown County along with the neighboring Door Peninsula, and is represented by Republican André Jacque of De Pere.
- the 2nd Senate district contains the rural northwestern quadrant of Brown County and vast areas of surrounding counties, and is represented by Republican Eric Wimberger of Oconto.
- the 30th Senate district contains the core urban and suburban areas of Green Bay, De Pere, Ashwaubenon, and Allouez, and is represented by Democrat Jamie Wall of Green Bay.

In the Wisconsin State Assembly, Brown County fully contains three Assembly districts (88th, 89th, and 90th), and makes up a portion of five other districts (the 1st, 2nd, 4th, 5th, and 6th).

- the 1st Assembly district contains just the northeast corner of Brown County then stretches into Kewaunee and Door counties, and is represented by Republican Joel Kitchens.
- the 2nd Assembly district contains the southern half of Brown County and the northern half of neighboring Manitowoc County along with a small portion of Outagamie County, and is represented by Republican Shae Sortwell.
- the 4th Assembly district contains the northern Brown County municipalities of Howard and Suamico, and extends north to eastern Oconto County, and is represented by Republican David Steffen.
- the 5th Assembly district contains western Brown County and eastern Outagamie County, and is represented by Republican Joy Goeben.
- the 6th Assembly district contains the northwestern Brown County municipalities of Pittsfield and Pulaski, then a wide area of the counties to the west, and is represented by Republican Elijah Behnke.
- the 88th Assembly district contains all of De Pere, Allouez, and Bellevue, and is represented by Republican Ben Franklin.
- the 89th Assembly district contains all of Ashwaubenon and part of the western side of Green Bay, and is represented by Democrat Ryan Spaude.
- the 90th Assembly district contains most of the city of Green Bay, and is represented by Democrat Amaad Rivera-Wagner.

== Education ==
School districts include:

- Ashwaubenon School District
- Brillion School District
- De Pere Unified School District
- Denmark School District
- Green Bay Area School District
- Howard-Suamico School District
- Kaukauna Area School District
- Luxemburg-Casco School District
- Pulaski Community School District
- Reedsville School District
- West De Pere School District
- Wrightstown Community School District

== See also ==
- National Register of Historic Places listings in Brown County, Wisconsin
- List of historical markers in Brown County, Wisconsin
