= Nancy Nusbaum =

American politician)

Brown County Executive
- In office September 9, 1995 – April 15, 2003
- Preceded by: Don Holloway (interim)
- Succeeded by: Carol Kelso

Personal details
- Born: 1946 (age 79–80)
- Party: Democrat (2001–present)
- Other political affiliations: Republican (1994–2001); Independent (before 1994)
- Spouse: John
- Education: University of Wisconsin–Madison

Nancy Nusbaum (born 1946) is a Democratic politician who served as Brown County, Wisconsin, Executive from 1995 to 2003. She ran unsuccessfully for Wisconsin's 8th congressional district in 1994 as a Republican and in 2006 as a Democrat, and for the State Senate in the 2011 recall elections.

== Early life ==
Nusbaum grew up in Green Bay, Wisconsin, and graduated from Green Bay West High School and the University of Wisconsin–Madison. Her husband, John, was elected Mayor of De Pere in 1984, but was defeated for re-election in 1986 by Robert De Groot.

== Mayor of De Pere ==
In 1988, Nusbaum ran against De Groot for Mayor when he ran for re-election. She won first place in the primary and advanced to the general election against Alderman J. Glenn Lehnert, who defeated De Groot for second place. She defeated Lehnert by a wide margin, winning 56 percent of the vote to his 44 percent, and became the first female Mayor. She was re-elected unopposed in 1990, 1992, and 1994.

In 1994, Nusbaum joined the Republican Party, and ran against Republican Congressman Toby Roth, who represented Wisconsin's 8th congressional district, in the Republican primary. Roth ultimately defeated Nusbaum in a landslide, receiving 68 percent of the vote to her 32 percent.

== Brown County Executive ==
In 1995, shortly after he was re-elected to a third term, County Executive Tom Cuene resigned from office, triggering a special election. Nusbaum ran in the special election, and placed first in the primary election, winning 49 percent of the vote. She defeated County Supervisor Jerome Van Sistine, a former State Senator, in the general election with 62 percent of the vote, and became the first female County Executive in county history.

Brown was re-elected in 1999 against Humboldt Town Board Chairman Norbert Dantinne Jr., winning 54 percent of the vote to his 46 percent.

In January 2001, she switched to the Democratic Party, citing the stronger support that state Democrats provided to local governments than Republicans. She ran for Lieutenant Governor in 2002, but dropped out of the race on February 14, 2002, stating that Governor Scott McCallum's proposed budget cuts to local governments required her to focus on her duties as County Executive.

In 2002, Nusbaum attracted national attention when she exercised her veto power for the first time and vetoed a resolution that would have established English as the official language of the county. In her veto message, Brown cited the "very hurtful debate" over the resolution and the effect on the region's local immigrant community.

Nusbaum did not seek a third term as County Executive in 2003. After she left office, she was appointed by state Attorney General Peg Lautenschlager to serve as the Director of the Office of Crime Victim Services. Nusbaum resigned as Director in 2005 when she announced that she would run for Congress.

== 2006 congressional campaign ==
In 2005, Nusbaum announced that she would run to succeed Republican Congressman Mark Green in Wisconsin's 8th congressional district in 2006. She was defeated by physician Steve Kagen in the Democratic primary.

== 2011 State Senate campaign ==
Following the passage of Act 10, which ended collective bargaining for most public employee unions, and the subsequent protests, Republican State Senator Robert Cowles faced a recall election in District 2. On May 18, 2011, Nusbaum announced that she would run against Cowles. In the Democratic primary, she faced former Republican State Representative Otto Junkermann, a supporter of Cowles, who ran as a spoiler candidate in the hopes of preventing a serious campaign against Cowles. Nusbaum defeated Junkermann in the primary, and advanced to the general election against Cowles. Nusbaum ultimately lost to Cowles by a wide margin, receiving 42 percent of the vote to Cowles' 57 percent.
