= 2011 Brown County, Wisconsin Executive election =

- April 5, 2011

Nominee	Troy Streckenbach	Andy Nicholson
Party	Nonpartisan	Nonpartisan
Popular vote	32,144	22,800
Percentage	58.26%	41.32%
County Executive before election
Tom Hinz
Nonpartisan
Elected County Executive
Troy Streckenbach
Nonpartisan

The 2011 Brown County, Wisconsin Executive election took place on April 5, 2011. Incumbent County Executive Tom Hinz declined to run for re-election to a second term.

Five candidates ran to succeed him, the most candidates to run for the position since the 1995 special election. Three members of the County Board of Supervisors—Tim Carpenter, Patrick Moynihan, and Andy Nicholson—and businessmen Troy Streckenbach and Paul Linzmeyer ran in the election. During the campaign, Linzmeyer, who had been diagnosed with cancer, withdrew from the race, but remained on the ballot.

In the primary election, Nicholson and Streckenbach placed first and second, respectively, with Nicholson winning 28 percent of the vote and Streckenbach winning 27 percent. In the general election, the Green Bay Press-Gazette endorsed Streckenbach over Nicholson, praising his "grasp of the issues, ability to articulate a plan for Brown County and general leadership potential," despite his political inexperience.

Streckenbach ultimately defeated Nicholson by a wide margin, winning 58 percent of the vote to Nicholson's 41 percent.

== Primary election ==
=== Candidates ===
- Andy Nicholson, County Supervisor
- Troy Streckenbach, businessman
- Patrick Moynihan, County Supervisor
- Tim Carpenter, County Supervisor

==== Withdrawn ====
- Paul Linzmeyer, businessman

==== Declined ====
- Tom Hinz, incumbent County Executive

=== Results ===
Primary election results
Party	Candidate	Votes	%
Nonpartisan	Andy Nicholson	5,617	28.28%
Nonpartisan	Troy Streckenbach	5,340	26.89%
Nonpartisan	Patrick Moynihan	4,110	20.69%
Nonpartisan	Paul Linzmeyer	2,470	2,470%
Nonpartisan	Tim Carpenter	2,235	11.25%
Write-in		88	0.44%
Total votes		19,860	100.00%

== General election ==
=== Results ===
2011 Brown County Executive election
Party	Candidate	Votes	%
Nonpartisan	Troy Streckenbach	32,144	58.26%
Nonpartisan	Andy Nicholson	22,800	41.32%
Write-in		231	0.42%
Total votes		55,175	100.00%
