= Sugar Bush, Wisconsin =

Sugar Bush may refer to the following place in the U.S. state of Wisconsin:

- Sugar Bush, Brown County, Wisconsin, an unincorporated community
- Sugar Bush, Outagamie County, Wisconsin, an unincorporated community
