= Ledgeview, Wisconsin =

- Town
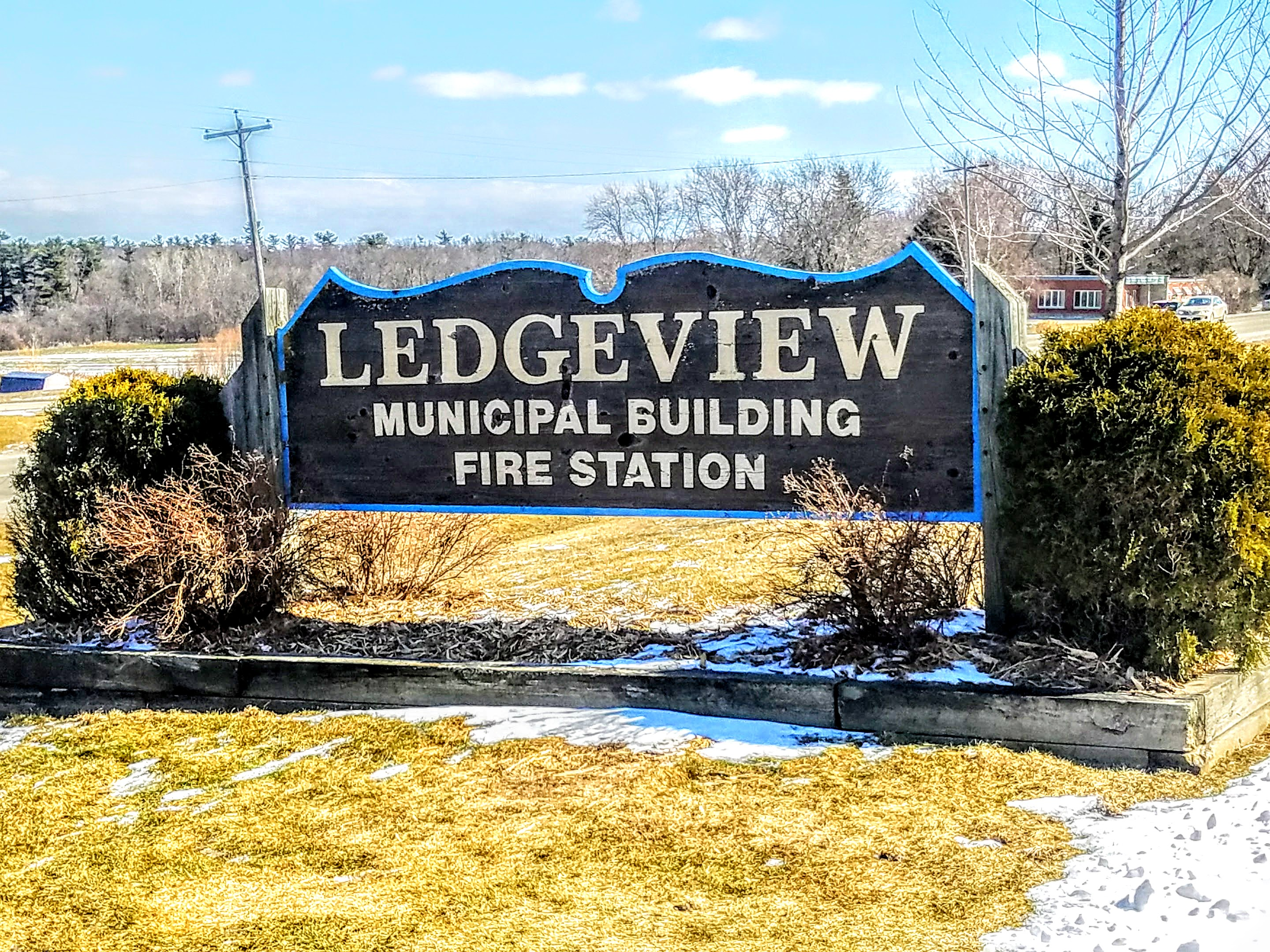
- Town hall and fire department sign
- Motto: "Set Your Sights High"
- Location in Brown County and the state of Wisconsin
- Coordinates: 44°25′26″N 87°59′10″W
- Country: United States
- State: Wisconsin
- County: Brown

Area
  - Total: 17.5 sq mi (45.4 km^{2})
  - Land: 17.4 sq mi (45.0 km^{2})
  - Water: 0.15 sq mi (0.4 km^{2})
- Elevation: 748 ft (228 m)

Population (2026)
  - Total: 9,373
  - Density: 539/sq mi (208/km^{2})
- Time zone: UTC-6 (Central (CST))
  - Summer (DST): UTC-5 (CDT)
- Area code: 920
- FIPS code: 55-43090
- GNIS feature ID: 1729678
- Website: www.ledgeview.wi.gov

Ledgeview is a town in Brown County in the U.S. state of Wisconsin. The population was 8,820 at the 2020 census. It is a suburb of Green Bay and is part of the Green Bay Metropolitan Area.

== Communities ==
- Kolb (alternatively Kolbs Corner) is an unincorporated community located at the intersections of County Highways G, V and MM.
- Pine Grove is an unincorporated community located at the intersection of County Road NN and Pine Grove Road, in between I-43 and County Road R (former routing of US 141).

== History ==
The town of Ledgeview was known as the "town of De Pere" from 1839 until 1994, when they changed their name to end confusion with the neighboring city of De Pere. Before 1839, the area that is now the town of Ledgeview was part of a slightly larger township called "Wilcox", named for Wisconsin pioneer Randall Wilcox.

== Geography ==
The Town of Ledgeview is located just south of the center of Brown County. It is bordered by the city of De Pere to the west, the village of Bellevue to the north, the Town of Eaton to the east, the Town of Glenmore to the south, and the Town of Rockland to the southwest. Downtown Green Bay is 7 miles (11 km) to the north.

According to the United States Census Bureau, the Town of Ledgeview has a total area of 17.5 square miles (45.4 km^{2}), of which 17.4 square miles (45.0 km^{2}) is land and 0.15 square miles (0.4 km^{2}), or 0.81%, is water.

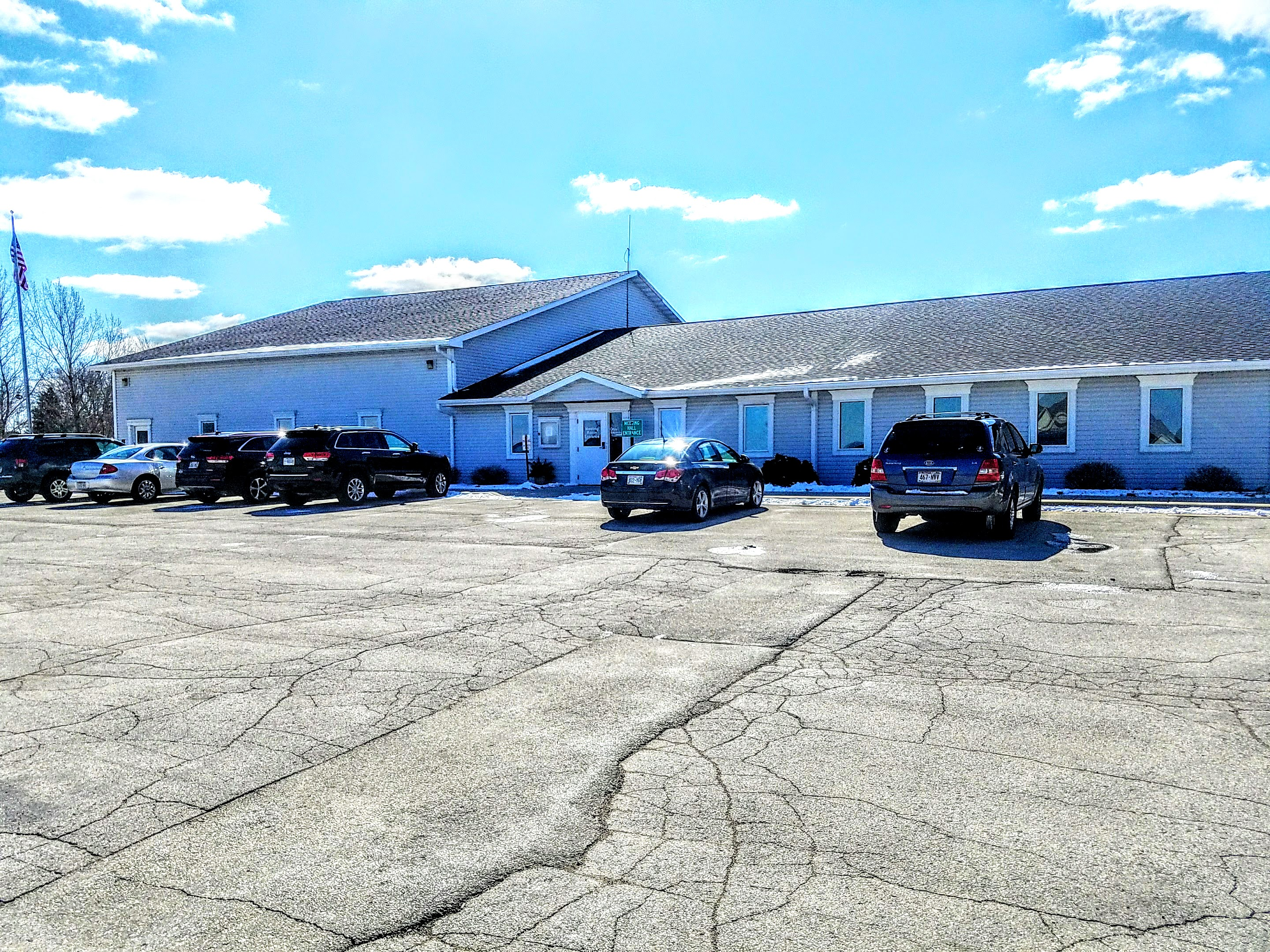
Ledgeview Town Hall

== Demographics ==
As of the census of 2000, there were 3,363 people, 1,180 households, and 913 families residing in the town. The population density was 190.9 people per square mile (73.7/km^{2}). There were 1,214 housing units at an average density of 68.9 per square mile (26.6/km^{2}). The racial makeup of the town was 98.69% White, 0.21% African American, 0.18% Native American, 0.39% Asian, 0.21% from other races, and 0.33% from two or more races. Hispanic or Latino people of any race were 0.74% of the population.

There were 1,180 households, out of which 42.7% had children under the age of 18 living with them, 69.9% were married couples living together, 4.6% had a female householder with no husband present, and 22.6% were non-families. 17.4% of all households were made up of individuals, and 4.3% had someone living alone who was 65 years of age or older. The average household size was 2.81 and the average family size was 3.23.

In the town, the population was spread out, with 29.9% under the age of 18, 6.5% from 18 to 24, 32.9% from 25 to 44, 22.4% from 45 to 64, and 8.3% who were 65 years of age or older. The median age was 35 years. For every 100 females, there were 105.3 males. For every 100 females age 18 and over, there were 104.5 males.

The median income for a household in the town was $67,188, and the median income for a family was $75,812. Males had a median income of $46,378 versus $35,875 for females. The per capita income for the town was $31,346. About 2.3% of families and 2.9% of the population were below the poverty line, including 2.9% of those under age 18 and 9.6% of those age 65 or over.

== Gallery ==
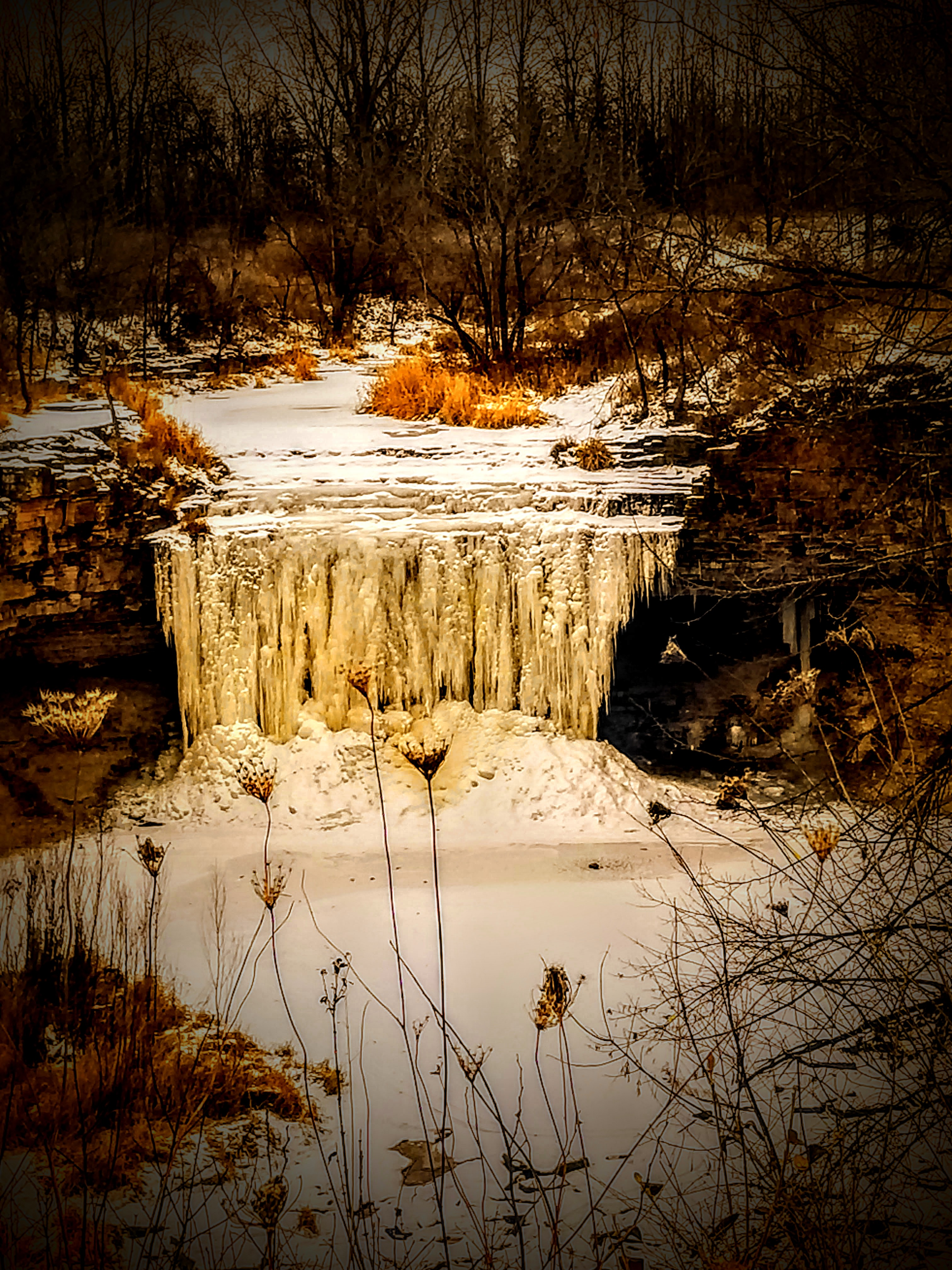
Fonferek's Glen

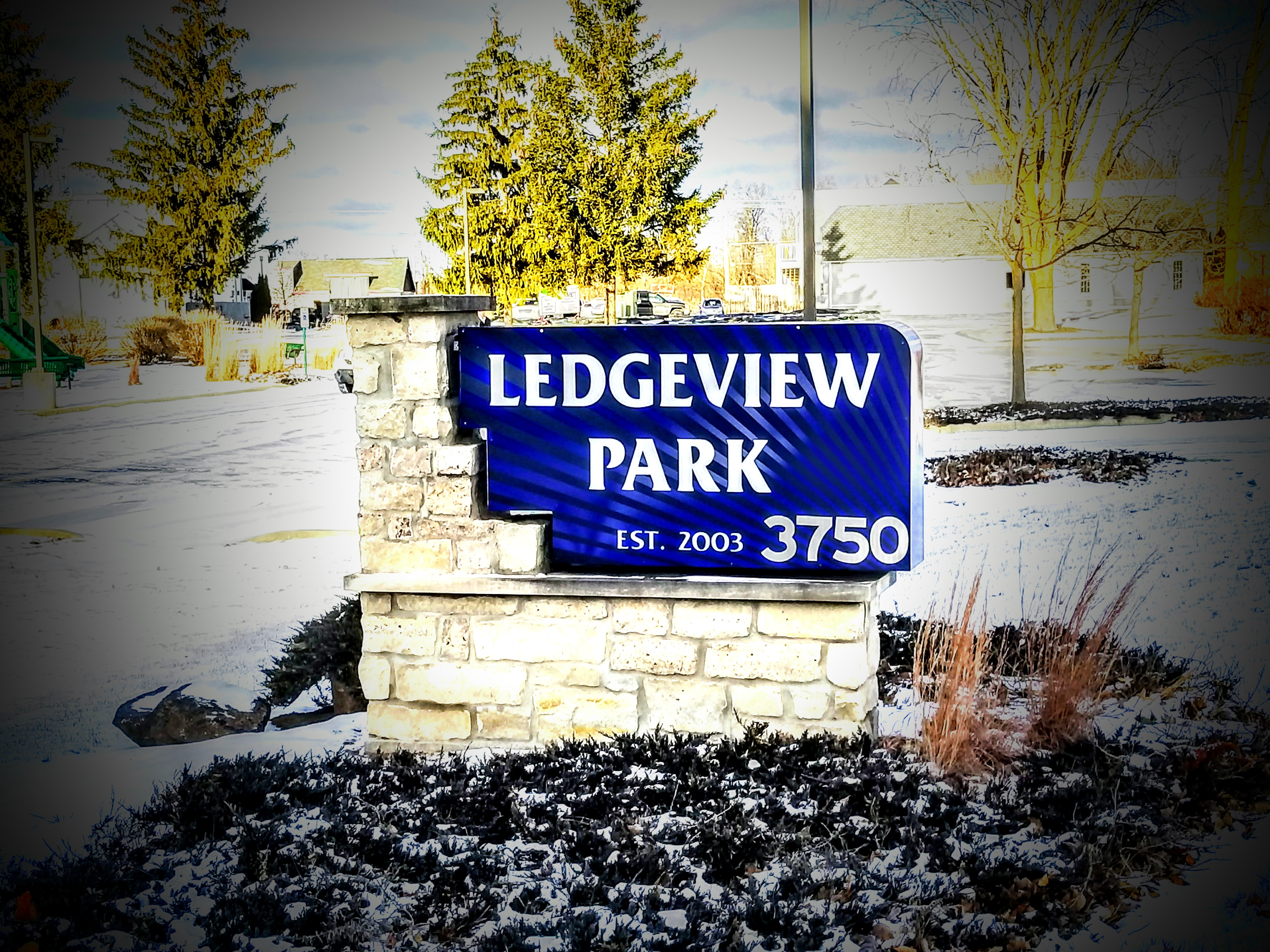
Ledgeview Park

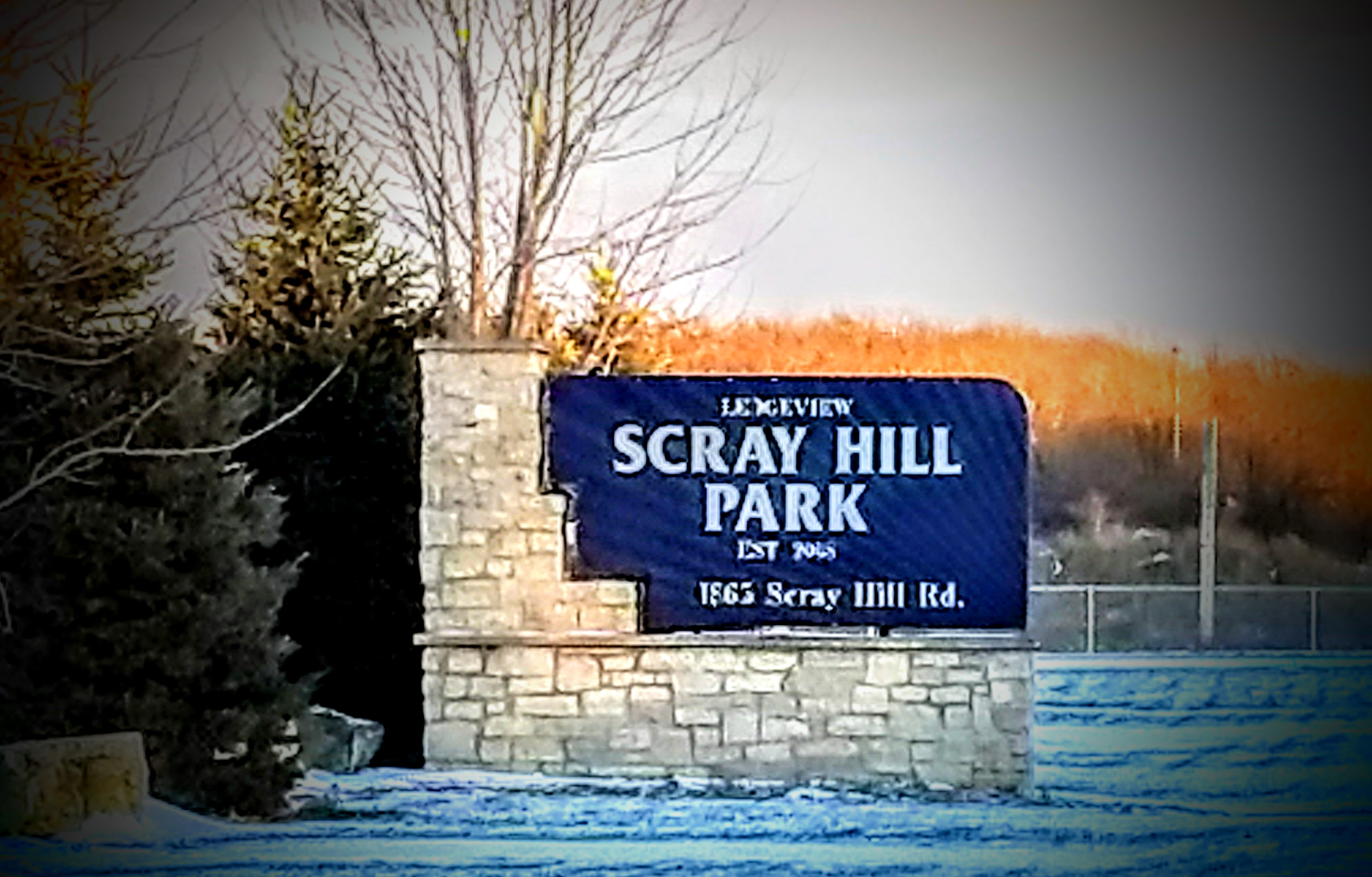
Scray Hill Park
