= Streckenbach =

Streckenbach is a German surname. Notable people with the surname include:

- Bruno Streckenbach (1902–1977), German Nazi SS general and Holocaust perpetrator
- Horst Streckenbach (1925–2001), German tattoo artist
- Troy Streckenbach (born 1972), American politician
