= Ferdinand Wittig =

American politician

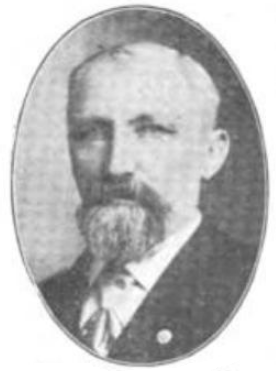

Member of the Wisconsin State Assembly
- In office 1908 – April 17, 1909
- Constituency: Brown County First District

Personal details
- Born: October 20, 1851 Denmark
- Died: April 17, 1909 (aged 57) New Denmark, Wisconsin
- Party: Republican
- Occupation: Farmer, politician

Ferdinand Wittig (October 20, 1851 – April 17, 1909) was an American merchant, farmer, and politician.

Born in Denmark, Wittig emigrated to the United States, in 1872, and settled in New Denmark, Brown County, Wisconsin. For a time he worked in the woods in northern Wisconsin and owned a farm in New Denmark. He was also in the general mercantile business and also owned a cheese factory. Wittig served as county treasurer for Brown County in 1907 and was a Republican. In 1909, Wittig served in the Wisconsin State Assembly until he died while still in office. Wittig died at his home in New Denmark, Wisconsin, as a result of a stroke he had suffered.
