= List of historical markers in Brown County, Wisconsin =

This is a list of historical markers in Brown County, Wisconsin.

Brown County Wisconsin

== Historical markers ==
Marker title	Image	Date dedicated	Location	Brief Description
Augustin de Langlade		1916	South Washington Street north of Crooks Street, on the right when traveling south, Green Bay, Wisconsin; 44.511367°N 88.018383°W	Marks location of first permanent settlers of Wisconsin home and trading house.
First Redemptorist Church In America			2121 Riverside Drive, Green Bay WI 54301; 44.4754°N 88.0335°W	Marks the location of the first St. John the Evangelist church 1832-1847
Freimann Hotel Building			348 South Washington Street, Green Bay WI 54301; 44.510767°N 88.018533°W	Marks location of one of Green Bay's oldest continuing commercial establishments.
St. John The Evangelist Congregation			413 St. John Street, Green Bay, WI 54301; 44.5126°N 88.0125°W	Marks location of the oldest continuous Catholic parish in Wisconsin.

== See also ==
National Register of Historic Places listings in Brown County, Wisconsin
