= Advent Tidende =

Danish-language magazine in the US (1871–1883)

- Editor: John Gotlieb Matteson
- Categories: Christian magazine
- Frequency: Monthly
- Publisher: Syvende-Dags Advent Trykkeri-Selskab
- Founded: 1871
- Final issue: 1883
- Country: United States
- Based in: Battle Creek, Michigan
- Language: Danish
- OCLC: 874162319

Advent Tidende (Danish: Advent Herald) was a monthly journal which was in circulation between 1871 and 1883. It was headquartered in Battle Creek, Michigan, and was the first publication of the Seventh-day Adventists in other language than the English language.

== History and profile ==
Advent Tidende was founded in 1871 and published by Syvende-Dags Advent Trykkeri-Selskab until 1883 in Battle Creek, Michigan. It was started by the Scandinavian Seventh-day Adventists, a Protestant Christian denomination, as a 21-page monthly publication. The editor was John Gotlieb Matteson. In the second year of its existence Advent Tidende was expanded, and its page number became thirty-two. The successor of the magazine which was published on a monthly basis was Sandhedens Tidende.

Several copies of Advent Tidende were sent to both Denmark and Norway from the USA.
