= 2015 Brown County, Wisconsin Executive election =

- April 7, 2015

Nominee	Troy Streckenbach	Tim Nowak
Party	Nonpartisan	Nonpartisan
Popular vote	25,544	9,887
Percentage	71.94%	27.84%
County Executive before election
Troy Streckenbach
Nonpartisan
Elected County Executive
Troy Streckenbach
Nonpartisan

The 2015 Brown County, Wisconsin Executive election took place on April 7, 2015. Incumbent County Executive Troy Streckenbach ran for re-election to a second term, the first County Executive to do so since Nancy Nusbaum in 1999. He was challenged by Tim Nowak, a firefighter and paramedic who owned a consulting firm. Streckenbach campaigned on his record in growing jobs and improving quality of life, while Nowak argued that his experience as a small business owner gave him the ability to grow the county.

Streckenbach ultimately defeated Nowak in a landslide, winning re-election with 72 percent of the vote.

== General election ==
=== Candidates ===
- Troy Streckenbach, incumbent County Executive
- Tim Nowak, firefighter and paramedic, owner of consulting firm

=== Results ===
2015 Brown County Executive election
Party	Candidate	Votes	%
Nonpartisan	Troy Streckenbach (inc.)	25,544	71.94%
Nonpartisan	Tim Nowak	9,887	27.84%
Write-in		78	0.05%
Total votes		35,509	100.00%
