= New Franken, Wisconsin =

- Unincorporated community
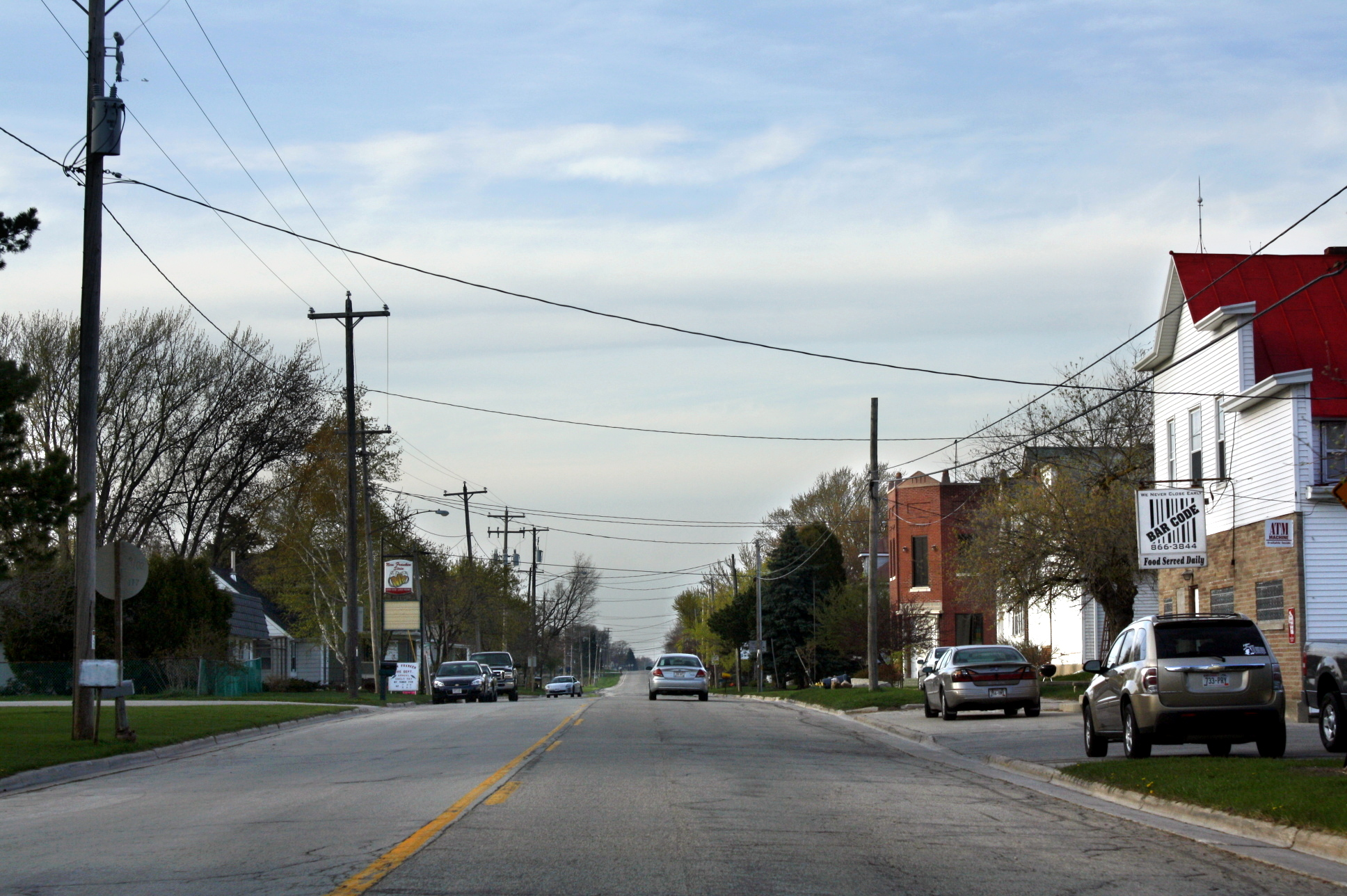
- Looking north at New Franken

- Location within Wisconsin Location within the United States
- Coordinates: 44°31′51″N 87°49′33″W
- Country: United States
- State: Wisconsin
- County: Brown
- Towns: Scott, Green Bay, Humboldt
- Elevation: 810 ft (250 m)

Population (2000)
  - Total: 3,724
  - Density: 86.5/sq mi (33.4/km^{2})
- Time zone: UTC-6 (Central (CST))
  - Summer (DST): UTC-5 (CDT)
- Zip code: 54229
- Area code: 920
- GNIS feature ID: 1569466

New Franken is an unincorporated community in the towns of Scott, Green Bay, and Humboldt in Brown County, Wisconsin, United States. It is part of the Green Bay metropolitan area.

== Notable person ==
- Dave Zuidmulder, NFL football player, was born in New Franken.

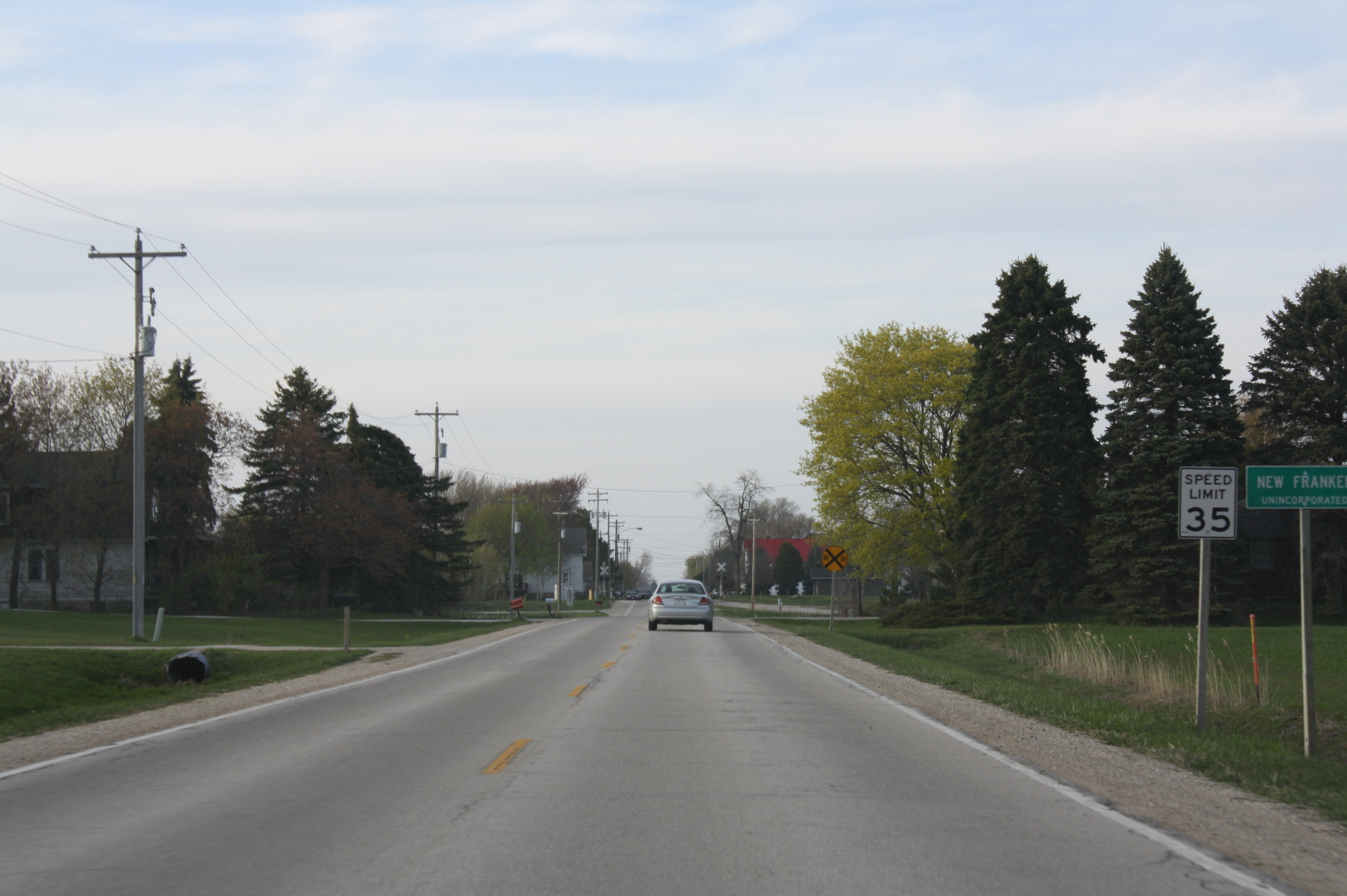
Looking north at the New Franken sign
