= 1999 Brown County, Wisconsin Executive election =

- April 9, 1999

Nominee	Nancy Nusbaum	Norbert Dantinne Jr.
Party	Nonpartisan	Nonpartisan
Popular vote	19,969	17,027
Percentage	53.93%	45.99%
County Executive before election
Nancy Nusbaum
Nonpartisan
Elected County Executive
Nancy Nusbaum
Nonpartisan

The 1999 Brown County, Wisconsin Executive election took place on April 9, 1999. Incumbent County Executive Nancy Nusbaum, who was elected in a 1995 special election, ran for re-election to a second term. She was challenged by Norbert Dantinne Jr., the Chairman of the Humboldt Town Board and one of Nusbaum's opponents in her first election. Nusbaum ultimately defeated Dantinne to win her second term, receiving 54 percent of the vote.

== General election ==
=== Candidates ===
- Nancy Nusbaum, incumbent County Executive
- Norbert Dantinne Jr., Chairman of the Humboldt Town Board, 1995 candidate for County Executive

=== Campaign ===
Nusbaum campaigned on her accomplishments in her first term, including on remediating pollution along the Fox River. Dantinne, on the other hand, argued that Nusbaum had made little progress in her first term, and said that his main priority was "to bring this county back moving forward instead of standing still."

The campaign between Nusbaum and Dantinne was negative, with Dantinne distributing leaflets to voters that Nusbaum alleged contained false statements. She submitted a complaint to the District Attorney alleging that Dantinne was violating the state's prohibition on knowingly making false statements, and requested an injunction against further distribution of the leaflets. Dantinne admitted that the leaflets contained errors, but argued that the literature was not unlawful, and called Nusbaum's complaint "yet another desperate act by a desperate candidate." The Brown District Attorney referred the complaint to the Outagamie County District Attorney's office to avoid a conflict of interest, which later concluded that, while the preparer of the literature "was careless, at a minimum," probable cause did not exist to support a criminal complaint.

Nusbaum was endorsed for re-election by the Green Bay Press-Gazette, which praised her for having "a clearly articulated vision for what Brown County needs to do, and the ability to get people with differing views to work together to accomplish her goals." The Press-Gazette noted that she had "delivered on most of the promises made in her successful 1995 campaign." And while the paper had endorsed Brown and Dantinne in the 1995 primary, it criticized Dantinne in the 1999 election, noting that "he has [either] dramatically changed his campaign style or he simply is getting bad advice," because "[m]uch of his campaign has focused on tearing down Nusbaum and her supporters, rather than clearly articulating his own positions." She ultimately won re-election with 54 percent of the vote to Dantinne's 46 percent, which was a closer margin than many observers predicted.

=== Results ===
1999 Brown County Executive election
Party	Candidate	Votes	%
Nonpartisan	Nancy Nusbaum (inc.)	19,969	53.93%
Nonpartisan	Norbert Dantinne Jr.	17,027	45.99%
Write-in		30	0.08%
Total votes		37,026	100.00%
