= Coppens Corner, Wisconsin =

- Unincorporated community
- Location within Wisconsin Location within the United States
- Coordinates: 44°27′30″N 87°47′08″W
- Country: United States
- State: Wisconsin
- County: Brown
- Town: Eaton
- Elevation: 899 ft (274 m)
- Time zone: UTC-6 (Central (CST))
  - Summer (DST): UTC-5 (CDT)
- Area code: 920
- GNIS feature ID: 1577558

Coppens Corner is an unincorporated community in the Town of Eaton, Brown County, Wisconsin, United States.

It is located at the corner of County Trunk JJ and County Trunk P. The community was named for Phil and Catherine Coppens, who owned land in the area in the 1860s.
