= New Denmark, Wisconsin =

- Town
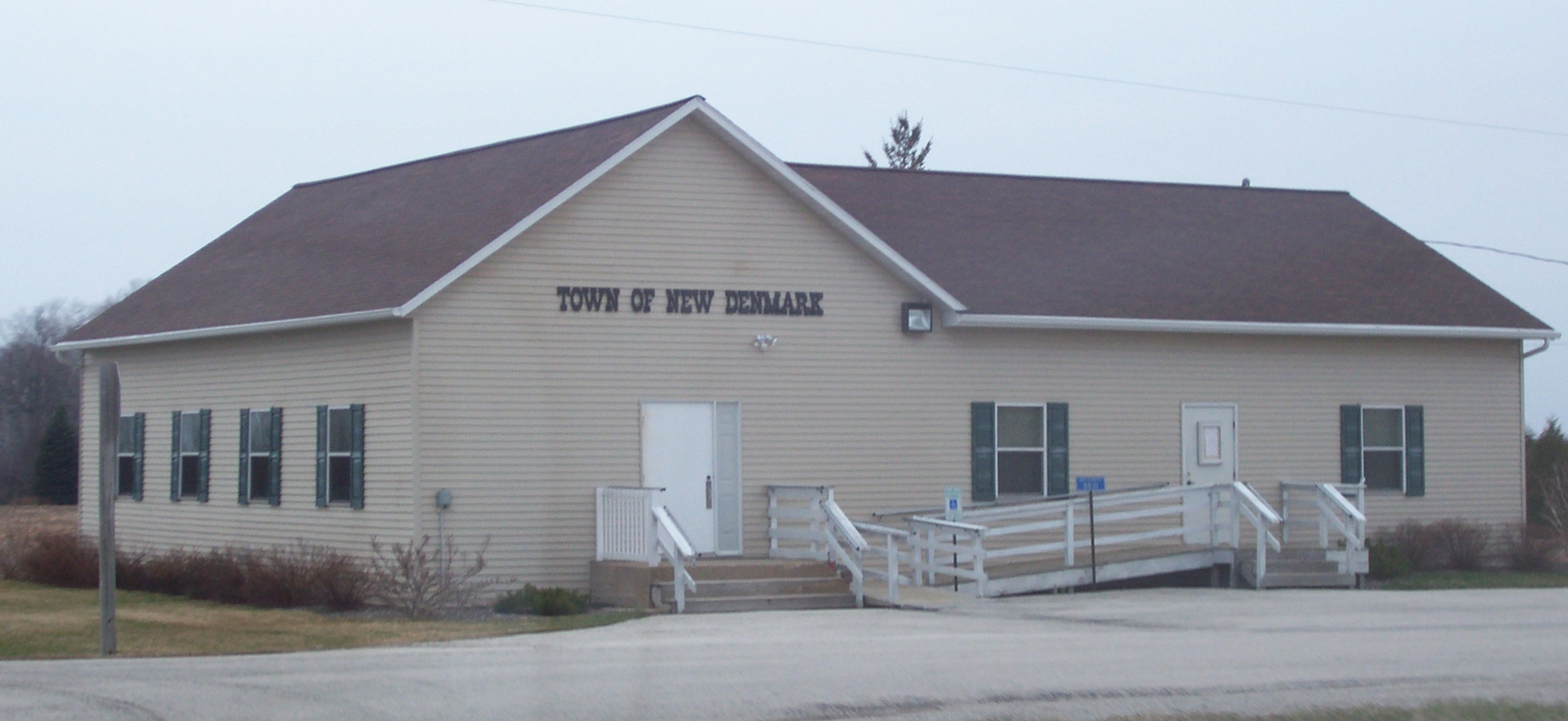
- Town hall

- Location in Brown County and the state of Wisconsin
- Coordinates: 44°22′12″N 87°50′7″W
- Country: United States
- State: Wisconsin
- County: Brown
- Established: 1855
- Named for: Denmark

Area
  - Total: 34.4 sq mi (89.1 km^{2})
  - Land: 34.1 sq mi (88.4 km^{2})
  - Water: 0.23 sq mi (0.6 km^{2})
- Elevation: 850 ft (260 m)

Population (2020)
  - Total: 1,562
  - Density: 45/sq mi (17.4/km^{2})
- Time zone: UTC-6 (Central (CST))
  - Summer (DST): UTC-5 (CDT)
- Area code: 920
- FIPS code: 55-56575
- GNIS feature ID: 1583803
- Website: townofnewdenmarkwi.gov

New Denmark is a town in Brown County in the U.S. state of Wisconsin. The population was 1,562 at the 2020 census. The town surrounds the village of Denmark but is separate from it. The unincorporated communities of Fontenoy and Langes Corners are located in the town. The unincorporated community of Buckman is also located partially in the town.

== History ==
New Denmark was settled by Danish immigrants in 1848, making it the oldest Danish settlement in the United States.

The Town of New Denmark had a post office called Cooperstown, which was later renamed "New Denmark". Cooperstown is now part of Manitowoc County. On March 8, 1855, the Brown County Board of Supervisors split New Denmark off from the town of De Pere, creating the Town of New Denmark.

On June 15, 1915, the community of Denmark, the commercial center of the Town of New Denmark, held a special election on the issue of incorporation. The official vote tally was 109 in favor, and 26 against. Later that year, Denmark was officially incorporated into a village.

== Geography ==
New Denmark is located in southeastern Brown County and is bordered by Manitowoc County to the south and Kewaunee County to the east. The town surrounds the village of Denmark, which is located south of the geographic center of the town.

According to the United States Census Bureau, the town has a total area of 34.4 square miles (89.1 km^{2}), of which 34.1 square miles (88.4 km^{2}) is land and 0.23 square miles (0.6 km^{2}), or 0.72%, is water.

== Demographics ==
Historical population
Census	Pop.	Note	%±
2000	1,482		—
2010	1,541		4.0%
2020	1,562		1.4%
U.S. Decennial Census

As of the census of 2000, there were 1,482 people, 515 households, and 417 families residing in the town. The population density was 42.7 people per square mile (16.5/km^{2}). There were 528 housing units at an average density of 15.2 per square mile (5.9/km^{2}). The racial makeup of the town was 98.58% White, 0.34% Native American, 0.61% Asian, 0.13% from other races, and 0.34% from two or more races. Hispanic or Latino of any race were 0.54% of the population.

There were 515 households, out of which 38.1% had children under the age of 18 living with them, 73.2% were married couples living together, 4.3% had a female householder with no husband present, and 19.0% were non-families. 17.3% of all households were made up of individuals, and 5.2% had someone living alone who was 65 years of age or older. The average household size was 2.87 and the average family size was 3.25.

In the town, the population was spread out, with 28.6% under the age of 18, 7.2% from 18 to 24, 29.0% from 25 to 44, 26.2% from 45 to 64, and 9.0% who were 65 years of age or older. The median age was 37 years. For every 100 females, there were 108.4 males. For every 100 females age 18 and over, there were 107.5 males.

The median income for a household in the town was $57,891, and the median income for a family was $61,750. Males had a median income of $40,804 versus $25,243 for females. The per capita income for the town was $23,313. About 1.7% of families and 4.3% of the population were below the poverty line, including 5.7% of those under age 18 and 7.2% of those age 65 or over.

== Highways ==
- Interstate 43 Northbound leads to Green Bay. Southbound leads to Manitowoc and Milwaukee.
- WIS 96 begins on the western edge of Denmark and travels west to Fremont.

== Notable people ==
- Dennis Dewane, Wisconsin State Representative, was first Chairman of New Denmark
- Lawrence J. Kafka, Wisconsin Representative from 1965-1972, was born in New Denmark
- Niels P. Larsen, Wisconsin State Representative, lived in New Denmark
- John G. Matteson, Danish Seventh-day Adventist minister
- James Rasmussen, Wisconsin State Representative, was Chairman of New Denmark
- Ferdinand Wittig, Wisconsin State Representative, lived in New Denmark
