= Buckman, Wisconsin =

- Unincorporated community
- Location within Wisconsin Location within the United States
- Coordinates: 44°24′52″N 87°47′07″W
- Country: United States
- State: Wisconsin
- County: Brown
- Towns: Eaton, New Denmark
- Elevation: 833 ft (254 m)
- Time zone: UTC-6 (Central (CST))
  - Summer (DST): UTC-5 (CDT)
- Area code: 920
- GNIS feature ID: 1562338

Buckman is an unincorporated community in the towns of Eaton and New Denmark, Brown County, Wisconsin, United States. It is located on County Highway P, five miles (eight kilometers) north-northeast of the village of Denmark. The community was named for Fred N. Buckman, a banker in Denmark, Wisconsin, who was appointed the community's first postmaster in 1900.
