= Kunesh, Wisconsin =

- Unincorporated community
- Location within Wisconsin Location within the United States
- Coordinates: 44°36′56″N 88°11′25″W
- Country: United States
- State: Wisconsin
- County: Brown
- Town: Pittsfield
- Elevation: 758 ft (231 m)
- Time zone: UTC-6 (Central (CST))
  - Summer (DST): UTC-5 (CDT)
- Area code: 920
- GNIS feature ID: 1567661

Kunesh (/ˈkuːnɪʃ/ KOO-nish) is an unincorporated community (formerly a village) in Brown County, Wisconsin, United States. It is located around the crossroads between sections 21, 22, 27 and 28, in the town of Pittsfield, Wisconsin.

Kunesh is located on County Highway U, 11 miles (18 km) northwest of Green Bay, Wisconsin.

== History ==
A post office was established in the community in March 8, 1894 and the community was named for George Kunesh (1864–1924), the first postmaster. The post office was discontinued on August 14, 1905. Kunesh, who was born in Bohemia, was naturalized in 1889; he was the son of Jan (John) and Dorota (Dora) Kuneš, who emigrated to the United States from Bohemia and farmed in Kewaunee County.
