= Kolb, Wisconsin =

- Unincorporated community
- Location within Wisconsin Location within the United States
- Coordinates: 44°25′22″N 87°57′47″W
- Country: United States
- State: Wisconsin
- County: Brown
- Town: Ledgeview
- Elevation: 830 ft (250 m)
- Time zone: UTC-6 (Central (CST))
  - Summer (DST): UTC-5 (CDT)
- Area code: 920
- GNIS feature ID: 1567607

Kolb (/ˈkoʊlb/ KOHLB; also called Kolb's Corner) is an unincorporated community located in the town of Ledgeview, Brown County, Wisconsin, United States. Kolb is located at the junction of County Highways G, V and MM, 7 miles (11 km) south-southeast of Green Bay. The community is named after Peter Kolb, who was the first postmaster when the post office opened in May 1887.
