= Pittsfield, Wisconsin =

- Town
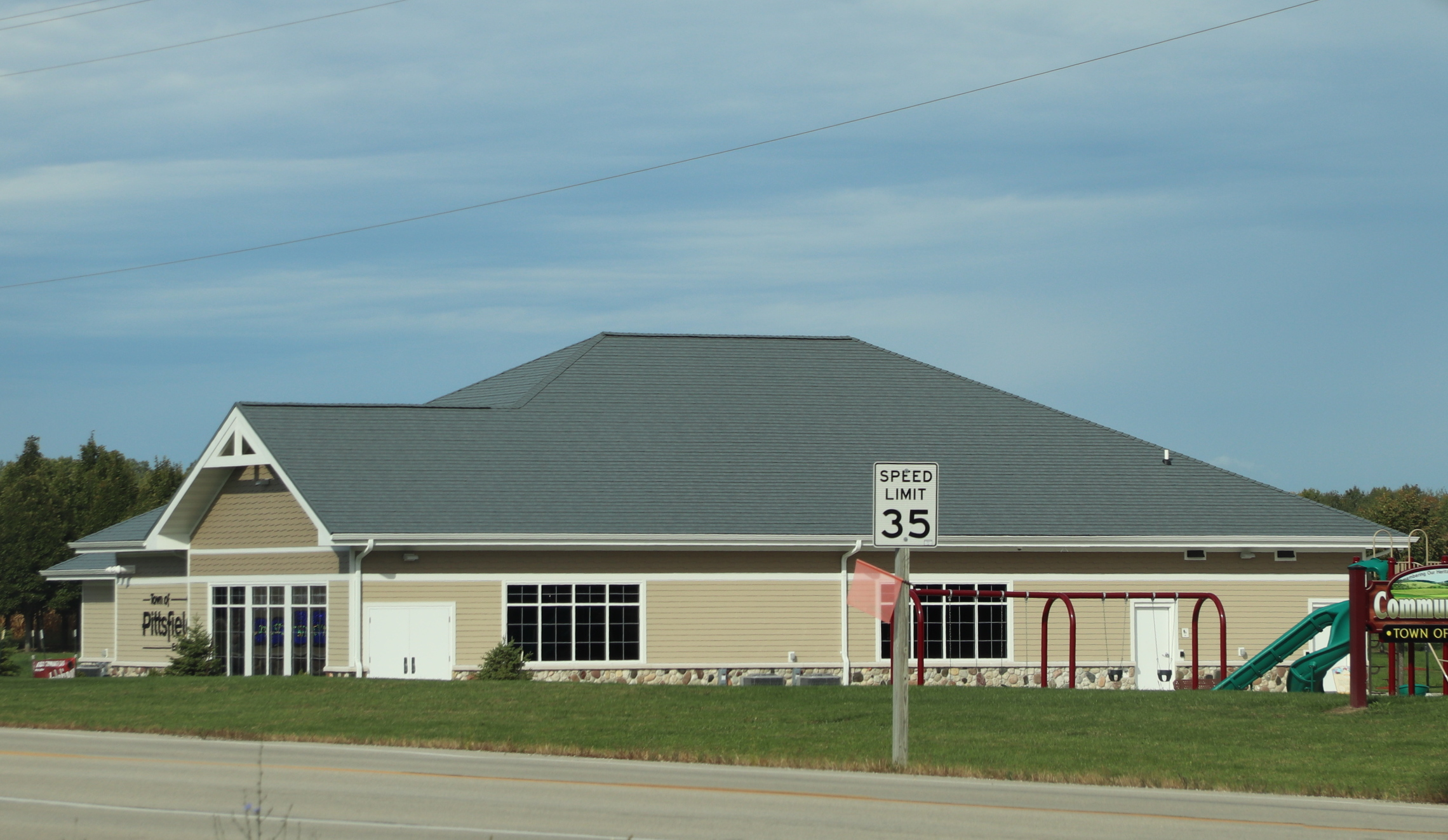
- Town hall

- Location in Brown County and the state of Wisconsin
- Coordinates: 44°37′44″N 88°11′08″W
- Country: United States
- State: Wisconsin
- County: Brown

Area
  - Total: 32.12 sq mi (83.18 km^{2})
  - Land: 32.09 sq mi (83.12 km^{2})
  - Water: 0.023 sq mi (0.06 km^{2})
- Elevation: 751 ft (229 m)

Population (2020)
  - Total: 2,791
  - Density: 86.97/sq mi (33.58/km^{2})
- Time zone: UTC-6 (Central (CST))
  - Summer (DST): UTC-5 (CDT)
- Area code: 920
- FIPS code: 55-63075
- GNIS feature ID: 1583928
- Website: www.townofpittsfield.org

Pittsfield is a town in Brown County in the U.S. state of Wisconsin. The population was 2,791 at the 2020 census.

== Communities ==
- Anston is an unincorporated community located along County Road U near the intersection with Anston Road. The community was named for a family of settlers within the area.
- Kunesh is a defunct village that is now unincorporated; it is located at the intersection of County Road U and Kunesh Road.
- Mill Center is an unincorporated community located at the intersection of County Road C and Glendale Avenue. Portions of the community are located in the nearby village of Howard.
- Pittsfield is an unincorporated community split between Brown and Shawano counties along WIS 156.

== Geography ==
Pittsfield is located in northwestern Brown County, bordered by Oconto County to the north, Shawano County to the west, and Outagamie County partially on the south. The village of Pulaski borders the northwestern corner of the town, the village of Suamico lies along the town's eastern border, and the village of Howard is to the south in Brown County. Downtown Green Bay is 11 miles (18 km) to the southeast.

According to the United States Census Bureau, Pittsfield has a total area of 32.1 square miles (83.2 km^{2}), of which 0.023 square miles (0.06 km^{2}), or 0.07%, is water.

== Demographics ==
As of the census of 2000, there were 2,433 people, 818 households, and 697 families residing in the town. The population density was 75.7 people per square mile (29.2/km^{2}). There were 838 housing units at an average density of 26.1 per square mile (10.1/km^{2}). The racial makeup of the town was 98.31% White, 0.21% African American, 0.62% Native American, 0.53% Asian, 0.04% from other races, and 0.29% from two or more races. Hispanic or Latino of any race were 0.41% of the population.

There were 818 households, out of which 43.2% had children under the age of 18 living with them, 75.9% were married couples living together, 4.9% had a female householder with no husband present, and 14.7% were non-families. 10.6% of all households were made up of individuals, and 3.9% had someone living alone who was 65 years of age or older. The average household size was 2.95 and the average family size was 3.18.

In the town, the population was spread out, with 29.1% under the age of 18, 5.5% from 18 to 24, 29.8% from 25 to 44, 27.2% from 45 to 64, and 8.4% who were 65 years of age or older. The median age was 38 years. For every 100 females, there were 105.8 males. For every 100 females age 18 and over, there were 102.8 males.

The median income for a household in the town was $61,250, and the median income for a family was $64,113. Males had a median income of $41,406 versus $26,821 for females. The per capita income for the town was $22,000. About 1.2% of families and 2.3% of the population were below the poverty line, including 0.8% of those under age 18 and 4.1% of those age 65 or over.
