= Henrysville, Wisconsin =

- Unincorporated community
- Location within Wisconsin Location within the United States
- Coordinates: 44°26′38″N 87°47′09″W
- Country: United States
- State: Wisconsin
- County: Brown
- Town: Eaton
- Elevation: 896 ft (273 m)
- Time zone: UTC-6 (Central (CST))
  - Summer (DST): UTC-5 (CDT)
- Area code: 920
- GNIS feature ID: 1577638

Henrysville is an unincorporated community in the Town of Eaton, Brown County, Wisconsin, United States. It is located at the junction of Wisconsin Highway 29 and County Highway P, 12 miles (19 km) east-southeast of Green Bay. In May 1879, John Henry Osterloh opened a post office in the community.
