= Poland, Wisconsin =

- Unincorporated community
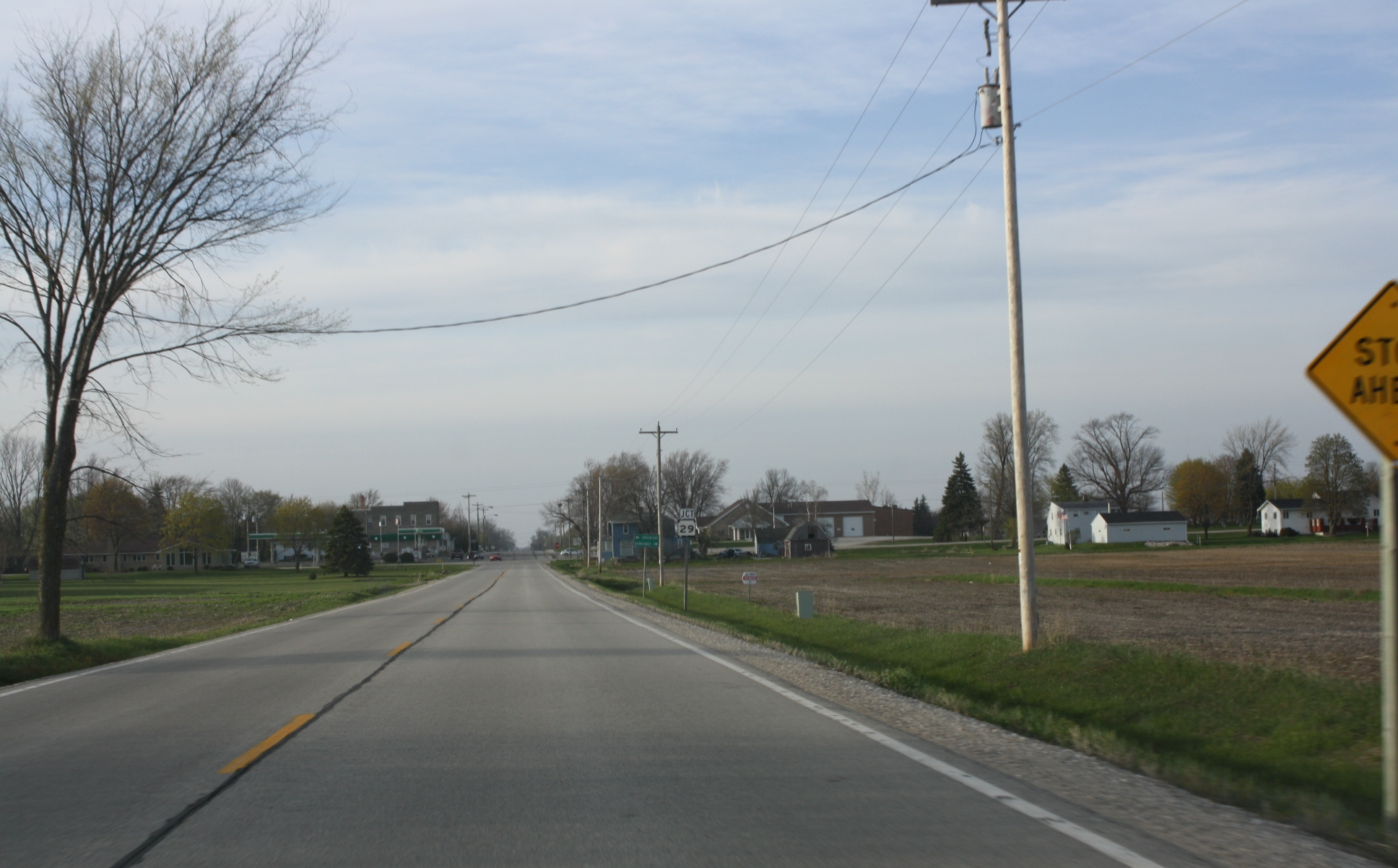
- Looking north at Poland

- Location within the state of Wisconsin
- Coordinates: 44°26′37″N 87°49′34″W
- Country: United States
- State: Wisconsin
- County: Brown
- Town: Eaton
- Elevation: 817 ft (249 m)
- Time zone: UTC-6 (Central (CST))
  - Summer (DST): UTC-5 (CDT)
- Area code: 920
- GNIS feature ID: 1571732

Poland is an unincorporated community in the Town of Eaton, Brown County, Wisconsin, United States. It is located at the intersection of County Highway T and Wisconsin Highway 29, several miles east of Green Bay. It is located at latitude 44-26-37N and longitude 87-49-34W.

Poland was named for and by the many Polish immigrants who settled in the area during the 1870s. In 1881, community members built SS. Cyril and Methodius Catholic Church in the heart of Poland. The church was destroyed by fire in 1898, and a new church was constructed the following year.

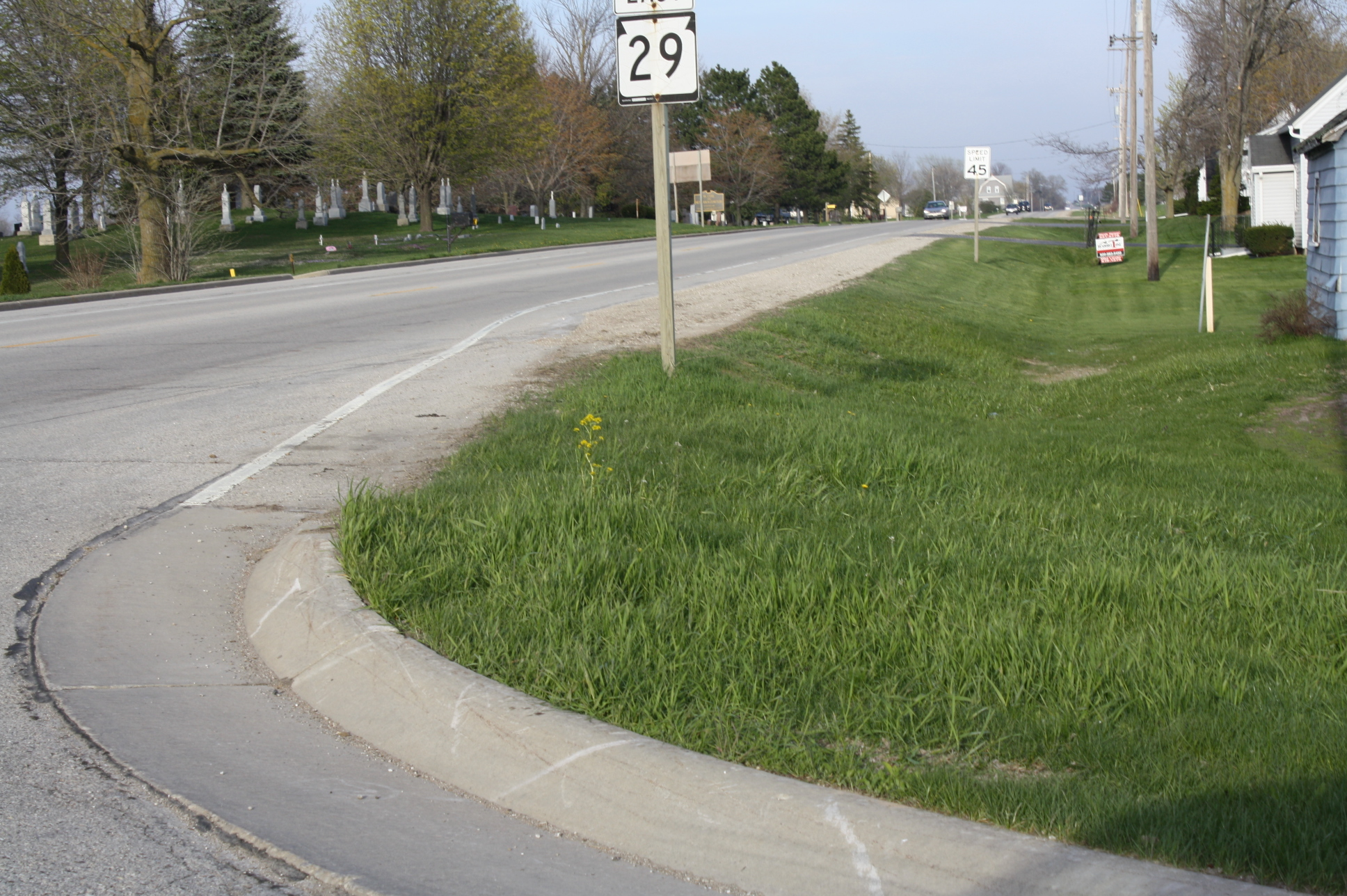
Looking east along WIS 29
