= Langes Corners, Wisconsin =

- Unincorporated community
- Location within Wisconsin Location within the United States
- Coordinates: 44°23′08″N 87°51′39″W
- Country: United States
- State: Wisconsin
- County: Brown
- Town: New Denmark
- Elevation: 873 ft (266 m)
- Time zone: UTC-6 (Central (CST))
  - Summer (DST): UTC-5 (CDT)
- Area code: 920
- GNIS feature ID: 1581156

Langes Corners (/ˈlæŋz/ LANGZ) is an unincorporated community in the Town of New Denmark, Brown County, Wisconsin, United States, along County Highway R, 3 miles (4.8 km) northwest of the village of Denmark. It is named for members of the Lange family, who founded it in the 1890s. Frank Sindzinski became the first postmaster when the post office opened in May 1900.
