= Fontenoy, Wisconsin =

- Unincorporated community
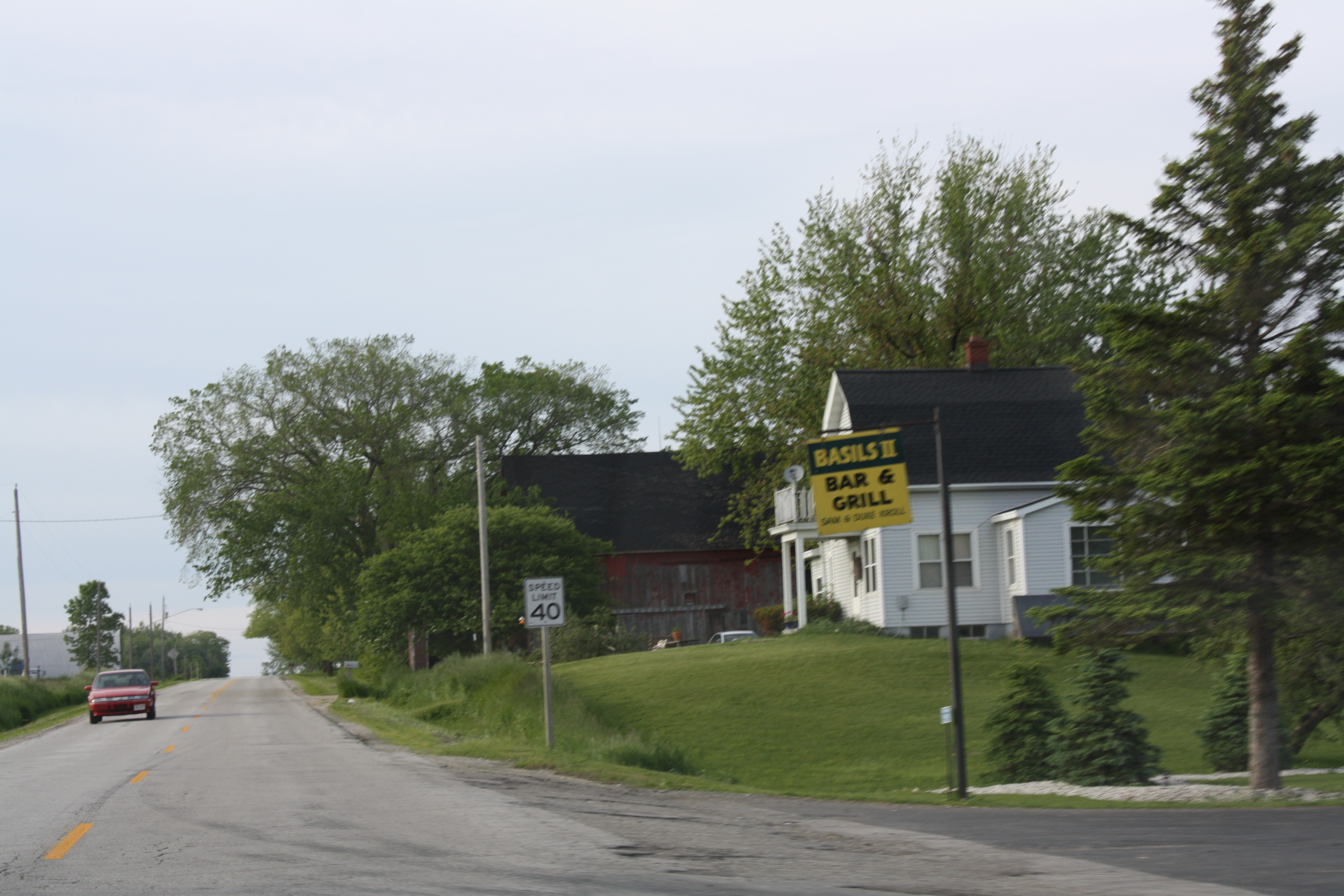
- Looking north at Fontenoy

- Location within Wisconsin Location within the United States
- Coordinates: 44°22′16″N 87°47′10″W
- Country: United States
- State: Wisconsin
- County: Brown
- Town: New Denmark
- Elevation: 843 ft (257 m)
- Time zone: UTC-6 (Central (CST))
  - Summer (DST): UTC-5 (CDT)
- Area code: 920
- GNIS feature ID: 1565100

Fontenoy (/ˈfɒntənɔɪ/ FON-tə-noy) is an unincorporated community in the Town of New Denmark in Brown County, Wisconsin, United States. It is located on County Highway P, approximately 2 miles (3.2 km) northeast of the village of Denmark. The community was named by Dennis DeWane, of Irish heritage, in reference to the Irishmen who fought at Fontenoy.

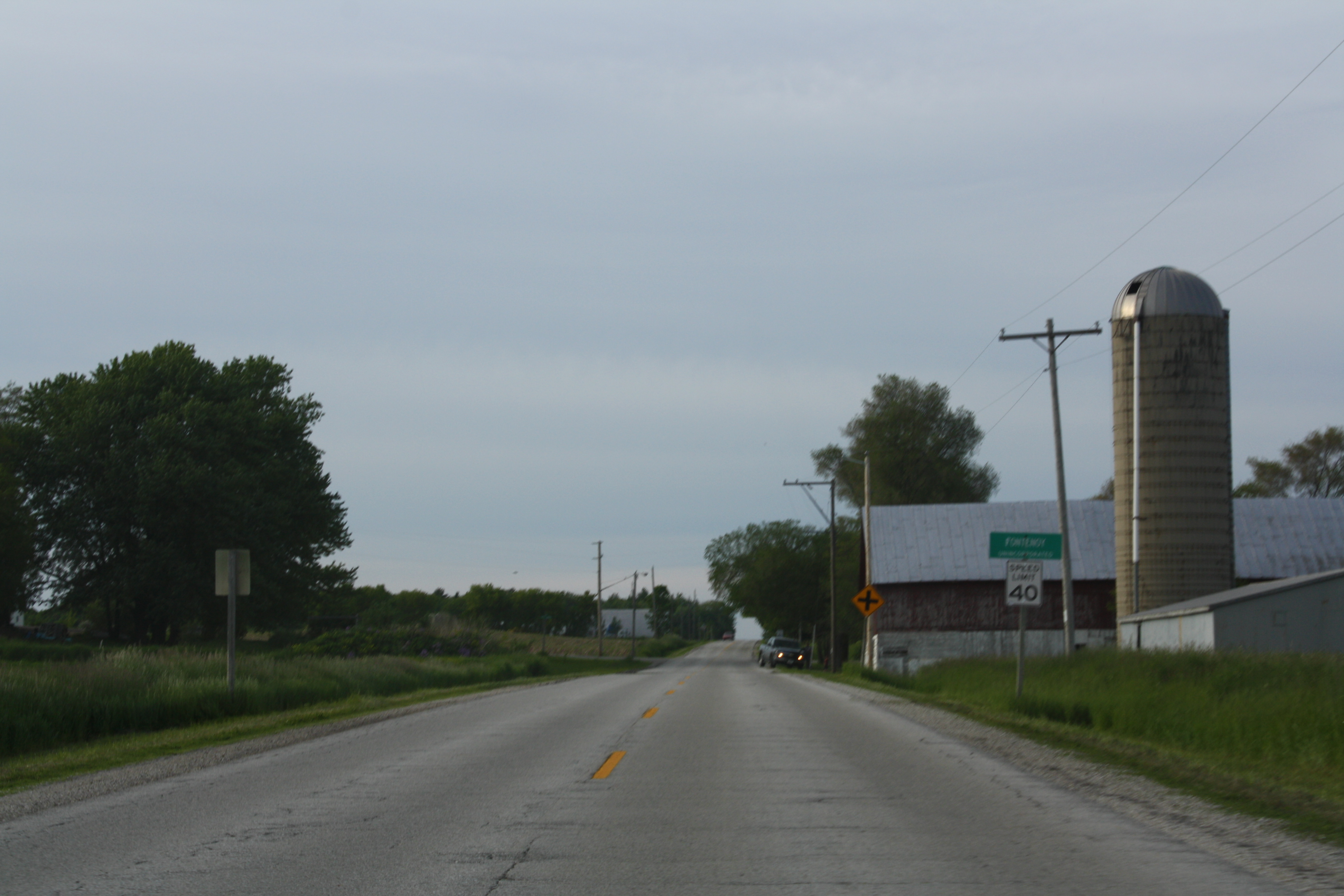
Looking north at the sign for Fontenoy
