= Sugar Bush, Brown County, Wisconsin =

Sugar Bush, Wisconsin
- Unincorporated community
- Location within Wisconsin Location within the United States
- Coordinates: 44°30′06″N 87°47′08″W
- Country: United States
- State: Wisconsin
- County: Brown
- Town: Humboldt
- Elevation: 850 ft (260 m)
- Time zone: UTC-6 (Central (CST))
  - Summer (DST): UTC-5 (CDT)
- Area code: 920
- GNIS feature ID: 1575013

Sugar Bush is an unincorporated community located in the town of Humboldt, Brown County, Wisconsin, United States. Sugar Bush is located at the junctions of County Highways N and P, 11 miles (18 km) east of Green Bay. The name was given due to a sizeable grove of sugar maple trees there. The hamlet was once known as Schiller. St. Hubert Parish of Sugarbush was established in 1872 as a mission church serving the Walloon Belgian community.

In 1887 Telesphore Charlier, who operated a hotel, bar, and livery stable, opened a post office.
