= 2023 Brown County, Wisconsin Executive election =

- April 4, 2023
Nominee	Troy Streckenbach
Party	Nonpartisan
Popular vote	60,766
Percentage	98.73%
County Executive before election
Troy Streckenbach
Nonpartisan
Elected County Executive
Troy Streckenbach
Nonpartisan

The 2023 Brown County, Wisconsin Executive election took place on April 4, 2023. Incumbent County Executive Troy Streckenbach ran for re-election to a fourth term. He faced no opposition and was re-elected unopposed.

== General election ==
=== Candidates ===
- Troy Streckenbach, incumbent County Executive

=== Results ===
2023 Brown County Executive election
Party	Candidate	Votes	%
Nonpartisan	Troy Streckenbach (inc.)	60,766	98.73%
Write-in		784	1.27%
Total votes		61,550	100.00%
