= 1995 Brown County, Wisconsin Executive special election =

- August 22, 1995

Nominee	Nancy Nusbaum	Jerome Van Sistine
Party	Nonpartisan	Nonpartisan
Popular vote	18,571	11,274
Percentage	62.22%	37.78%
County Executive before election
Don Holloway (acting)
Nonpartisan
Elected County Executive
Nancy Nusbaum
Nonpartisan

The 1995 Brown County, Wisconsin Executive special election took place on August 22, 1995, following a primary election on July 25, 1995. Several weeks after winning re-election on April 4, 1995, County Executive Tom Cuene resigned effective June 2. Guy Zima, the Chairman of the County Board, became acting County Executive until July 5, when former County Executive Don Holloway was appointed as interim Executive.

Five candidates ran in the special election: De Pere Mayor Nancy Nusbaum; County Supervisor and former State Senator Jerome Van Sistine, Zima, County Clerk Randy Johnson, and Humboldt Town Board Chairman Norbert Dantinne Jr. The Green Bay Press-Gazette endorsed Nusbaum and Dantinne as its top two choices, praising Nusbaum as "a proven leader" and Dantinne for having "a small town openness and candor and a record of distinction as Humboldt town chairman."

In the primary election, Nusbaum placed first by a wide margin, winning 49 percent of the vote. Van Sistine narrowly placed second with 14 percent of the vote, defeated Zima, who won 13 percent; Johnson, who won 12 percent; and Dantinne, who won 11 percent.

In the general election, Nusbaum was endorsed by the Green Bay Press-Gazette, which praised her for showing "an ability to work with the business community and other elected officials" as Mayor, and criticized Van Sistine as "lack[ing] the vision and energy to lead Brown County government at this critical juncture." Nusbaum defeated Van Sistine by a wide margin, receiving 62 percent of the vote to his 38 percent, and becoming the county's first female County Executive.

== Primary election ==
=== Candidates ===
- Nancy Nusbaum, Mayor of De Pere
- Jerome Van Sistine, County Supervisor, former State Senator, 1983 candidate for County Executive
- Guy Zima, former acting County Executive
- Randy Johnson, County Clerk
- Norbert Dantinne Jr., Chairman of the Humboldt Town Board

==== Declined ====
- Mike Donart, County Sheriff
- Gary Drzewiecki, State Senator
- Mark Green, State Representative
- Tim Hinkfuss, County Supervisor, 1995 candidate for Mayor of Green Bay
- Carol Kelso, State Representative
- Chuck Kuehn, businessman, 1995 candidate for Mayor of Green Bay
- Ted Pamperin, Ashwaubenon Village President, former Chairman of the County Board
- Dean Reich, acting County Board Chairman
- Pat Webb, County Finance Director

=== Results ===
Primary election results
Party	Candidate	Votes	%
Nonpartisan	Nancy J. Nusbaum	14,757	49.17%
Nonpartisan	Jerome Van Sistine	4,246	14.15%
Nonpartisan	Guy Zima	3,991	13.30%
Nonpartisan	Randy D. Johnson	3,653	12.17%
Nonpartisan	Norbert Dantinne Jr.	3,365	11.21%
Total votes		30,012	100.00%

== General election ==
=== Results ===
1995 Brown County Executive special election
Party	Candidate	Votes	%
Nonpartisan	Nancy Nusbaum	18,571	62.22%
Nonpartisan	Jerome Van Sistine	11,274	37.78%
Total votes		29,845	100.00%
