= Troy Streckenbach =

American politician

Brown County Executive
- Incumbent
- Assumed office April 20, 2011
- Preceded by: Tom Hinz

Personal details
- Born: 1972 (age 53–54) Green Bay, Wisconsin, U.S.
- Party: Independent
- Education: University of Wisconsin–Oshkosh

Troy Streckenbach (born 1972) is an American politician and businessman from Green Bay who currently serves as the Brown County, Wisconsin Executive. Streckenbach was elected County Executive in 2011 and re-elected in 2015, 2019, and 2023.

Streckenbach is a life-long resident of Brown County and grew up in the Green Bay area. Streckenbach graduated from the University of Wisconsin–Oshkosh with a degree in International Studies and an emphasis in Business and Political Science. Streckenbach has owned and operated six businesses in Brown County for the past 16 years.
