= 2019 Brown County, Wisconsin Executive election =

- April 2, 2019

Nominee	Troy Streckenbach	Mark Berndt
Party	Nonpartisan	Nonpartisan
Popular vote	34,941	11,637
Percentage	74.82%	24.92%
County Executive before election
Troy Streckenbach
Nonpartisan
Elected County Executive
Troy Streckenbach
Nonpartisan

The 2019 Brown County, Wisconsin Executive election took place on April 2, 2019. Incumbent County Executive Troy Streckenbach ran for re-election to a third term. Though outgoing Green Bay Mayor Jim Schmitt took out papers to challenge Streckenbach, he ultimately declined to run.

Instead, Streckenbach faced former County Supervisor Mark Berndt, a financial advisor. He defeated Berndt in a landslide, winning 75 percent of the vote.

== General election ==
=== Candidates ===
- Troy Streckenbach, incumbent County Executive
- Mark Berndt, former County Supervisor, financial advisor

==== Declined ====
- Jim Schmitt, Mayor of Green Bay

=== Results ===
2019 Brown County Executive election
Party	Candidate	Votes	%
Nonpartisan	Troy Streckenbach (inc.)	34,941	74.82%
Nonpartisan	Mark Berndt	11,637	24.92%
Write-in		120	0.26%
Total votes		46,698	100.00%
