= John G. Matteson =

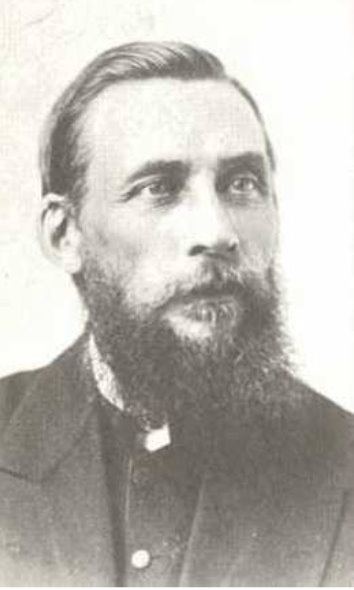

John G. Matteson (born Johan Gottlieb Mathiasen; May 1, 1835 – March 30, 1896) was a Seventh-day Adventist minister, evangelist, teacher, and missionary in Scandinavia, as well as a musician who edited and published the first Danish-Norwegian songbook.

== Background ==
Matteson was born in Tranekær, Langeland, Denmark in 1835 to Hans C. and Karen Sonia Johanson Mathiason. Even though he came from a poor family, he was given a good education in literature and music. Two years after starting work as a postal clerk, he immigrated to the United States in 1855 with his parents and two sisters and made their home in New Denmark, Wisconsin.

== Illness and death ==
Halfway through his third year at Union College, he became sick and went to live with his son in Southern California, hoping to get better. Matteson died two months later from chronic bronchitis. He died March 30, 1896, at 60 years old, in Los Angeles County.
