= Eaton, Brown County, Wisconsin =

Eaton, Wisconsin
- Town
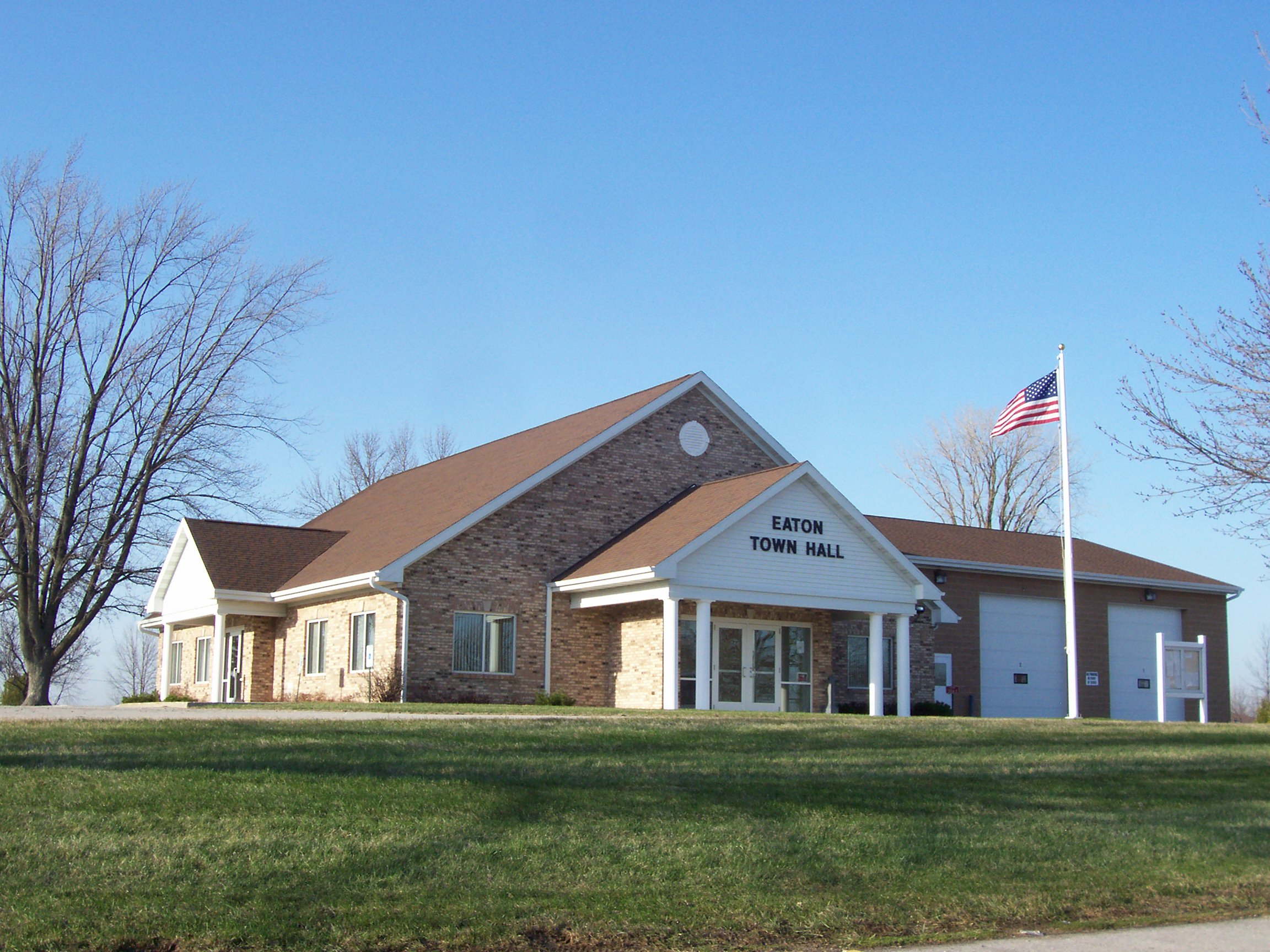
- Town hall

- Location in Brown County and the state of Wisconsin
- Coordinates: 44°26′38″N 87°50′48″W
- Country: United States
- State: Wisconsin
- County: Brown

Area
  - Total: 24.3 sq mi (62.9 km^{2})
  - Land: 24.1 sq mi (62.5 km^{2})
  - Water: 0.19 sq mi (0.5 km^{2})
- Elevation: 817 ft (249 m)

Population (2020)
  - Total: 1,662
  - Density: 68.9/sq mi (26.6/km^{2})
- Time zone: UTC-6 (Central (CST))
  - Summer (DST): UTC-5 (CDT)
- Area code: 920
- FIPS code: 55-22225
- GNIS feature ID: 1583121
- Website: www.eatonbrowncountywi.gov

Eaton is a town in Brown County in the U.S. state of Wisconsin. The population was 1,662 at the 2020 census. The unincorporated communities of Coppens Corner, Henrysville, and Poland are located in the town. The unincorporated community of Buckman is also located partially in the town.

== History ==
Eaton has existed since November 18, 1859 and was previously part of New Denmark. The town's name comes from its first settler, Austin Eaton, who came from Connecticut. By 1860, the census reports 151 persons in Eaton.

== Geography ==
According to the United States Census Bureau, the town has a total area of 24.3 square miles (62.9 km^{2}), of which 24.1 square miles (62.5 km^{2}) is land and 0.19 square miles (0.5 km^{2}), or 0.74%, is water.

== Demographics ==
As of the census of 2000, there were 1,414 people, 469 households, and 384 families residing in the town. The population density was 58.4 people per square mile (22.5/km^{2}). There were 480 housing units at an average density of 19.8 per square mile (7.7/km^{2}). The racial makeup of the town was 98.66% White, 0.21% Native American, 0.92% Asian, 0.07% from other races, and 0.14% from two or more races. Hispanic or Latino of any race were 0.85% of the population.

There were 469 households, out of which 43.1% had children under the age of 18 living with them, 74.6% were married couples living together, 3.8% had a female householder with no husband present, and 18.1% were non-families. 13.2% of all households were made up of individuals, and 5.3% had someone living alone who was 65 years of age or older. The average household size was 3.01 and the average family size was 3.33.

In the town, the population was spread out, with 30.7% under the age of 18, 7.2% from 18 to 24, 35.4% from 25 to 44, 19.2% from 45 to 64, and 7.6% who were 65 years of age or older. The median age was 34 years. For every 100 females, there were 109.5 males. For every 100 females age 18 and over, there were 107.6 males.

The median income for a household in the town was $57,171, and the median income for a family was $60,625. Males had a median income of $37,316 versus $23,491 for females. The per capita income for the town was $20,697. About 4.4% of families and 5.7% of the population were below the poverty line, including 5.5% of those under age 18 and 15.5% of those age 65 or over.
