= Freimann Hotel Building =

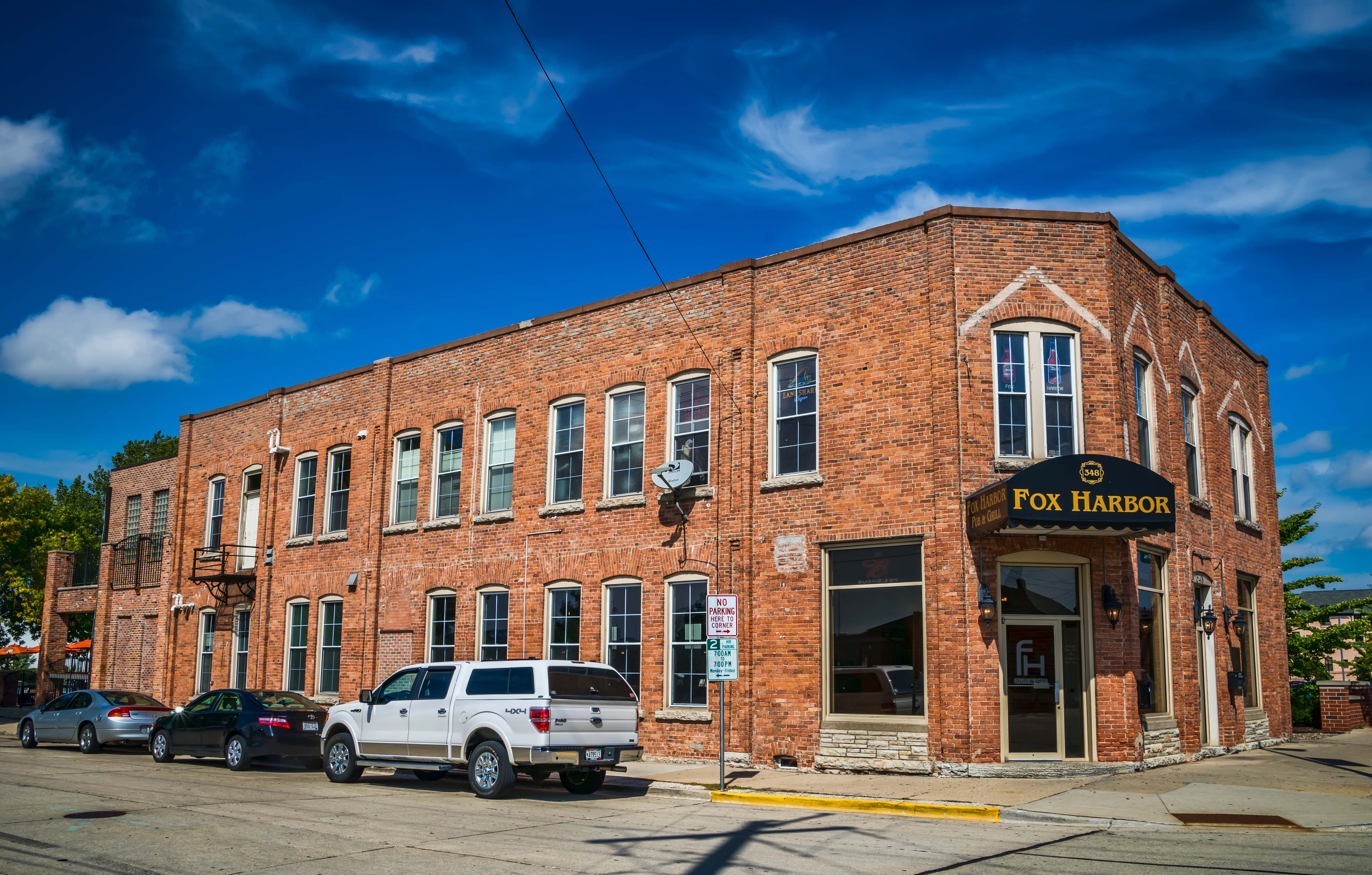
- Interactive map of the Freimann Hotel Building area
- Former names: O'Neil Hotel
- Alternative names: Fox Harbor Pub and Grill

General information
- Type: Hotel
- Location: 348 South Washington St., Green Bay
- Coordinates: 44.511010°N 88.018945°W
- Current tenants: Fox Harbor Pub and Grill
- Completed: 1896

The Freimann Hotel Building (1896) is one of Green Bay's oldest continuing commercial establishments. It is located along the Fox River State Recreational Trail. The building is listed in the Wisconsin Historical Society Register. it is one of only a few remaining 19th century buildings in downtown Green Bay.

== History ==
An earlier Friemann's Hotel was built in Green Bay in 1883, formally opening in October of that year. The successor building was constructed as a three-story hotel in 1896 by Michael Freimann. First called the O'Neil Hotel, and in 1898 renamed The New Freimann Hotel. Printed advertisements from the 1890s spoke of the good stabling afforded to guests at the Freimann Hotel with free bus service to the trains. The building was originally three stories, but in 1937 the name was changed to the Hofmann Hotel and the third floor was removed.

=== Historical Changes ===
The original second floor windows all have segmental arched openings and arched brick heads. Pilastered facade is original, but the first floor facing on South Washington Street has been totally altered.

=== Current tenants ===
The current tenant of the building is the Fox Harbor Pub and Grill. The building is located on the Fox River and there 10 boat slips for patrons to use when visiting the pub. The building is bordered on the north by Admiral Flatley Park and on the east by the Fox River. As an historic building, it has no elevator.

== See also ==
- Wisconsin Historical Society
