= Jerome Van Sistine =

20th century American politician

Member of the Wisconsin Senate from the 30th district
- In office January 3, 1977 – January 4, 1993
- Preceded by: Reuben La Fave
- Succeeded by: Gary Drzewiecki

Personal details
- Born: August 16, 1926 Milwaukee, Wisconsin, U.S.
- Died: January 20, 2015 (aged 88) Green Bay, Wisconsin, U.S.
- Cause of death: Alzheimer's disease
- Resting place: Fort Howard Memorial Park, Green Bay
- Party: Democratic
- Spouse: Joan L. Kaufman (m. 1953; died 1985)
- Children: 3

Military service
- Allegiance: United States
- Branch/service: United States Navy
- Battles/wars: World War II

Jerome J. Van Sistine (August 16, 1926 – January 20, 2015) was an American construction worker and Democratic politician from Green Bay, Wisconsin. He served four terms in the Wisconsin Senate, representing Wisconsin's 30th Senate district from 1977 to 1993.

== Biography ==
Van Sistine was born on August 16, 1926, in Milwaukee, Wisconsin. He graduated from West De Pere High School in De Pere, Wisconsin, as well as what is now the University of Wisconsin–Platteville. He was a school teacher and was in the building construction business. During World War II, Van Sistine was in the United States Navy. He was married with three children. He died on January 20, 2015, after a long period with Alzheimer's disease.

== Political career ==
Van Sistine was first elected to the Wisconsin State Senate in 1976, as a Democrat, representing the 30th district. Additionally, he was a member of the town board in Ashwaubenon, Wisconsin, and the board of supervisors in Brown County, Wisconsin. In 1990, he was a candidate for the United States House of Representatives from Wisconsin's 8th congressional district. He lost to the incumbent, Toby Roth. Van Sistine was defeated for re-election in 1992 by Gary Drzewiecki.
