= 1995 Brown County, Wisconsin Executive election =

- April 4, 1995

Nominee	Tom Cuene	Steve Lasee
Party	Nonpartisan	Nonpartisan
Popular vote	30,809	17,974
Percentage	63.12%	36.83%
County Executive before election
Tom Cuene
Nonpartisan
Elected County Executive
Tom Cuene
Nonpartisan

The 1995 Brown County, Wisconsin Executive election took place on April 4, 1995. Incumbent County Executive Tom Cuene ran for re-election to a third term. He was challenged by County Supervisor Steve Lasee. Because Cuene and Lasee were the only two candidates to file, the primary election was cancelled and the candidates proceeded to the general election.

Cuene started the race as the favorite over Lasee, raising significantly more money than him and earning the endorsement of the Green Bay Press-Gazette, which praised his "intelligence, determination and vision." However, the County Board of Supervisors split in its support, with nearly half of the Board endorsing Lasee over Cuene.

Cuene ultimately defeated Lasee by a wide margin, winning re-election with 63 percent of the vote.

However, Cuene did not end up serving his third term. Several weeks after winning re-election, he announced that he would resign as County Executive effective June 2, 1995, to accept a position at American Medical Security, an insurance marketing company, which triggered a special election.

== General election ==
=== Candidates ===
- Tom Cuene, incumbent County Executive
- Steve Lasee, County Supervisor

=== Results ===
1995 Brown County Executive election
Party	Candidate	Votes	%
Nonpartisan	Thomas Cuene (inc.)	30,809	63.12%
Nonpartisan	Steve Lasee	17,974	36.83%
Write-in		24	0.05%
Total votes		48,807	100.00%
