= Humboldt, Wisconsin =

- Town
- Location in Brown County and the state of Wisconsin.
- Coordinates: 44°30′33″N 87°50′10″W
- Country: United States
- State: Wisconsin
- County: Brown

Area
  - Total: 24.0 sq mi (62.2 km^{2})
  - Land: 24.0 sq mi (62.2 km^{2})
  - Water: 0 sq mi (0.0 km^{2})
- Elevation: 801 ft (244 m)

Population (2020)
  - Total: 1,299
  - Density: 54.1/sq mi (20.9/km^{2})
- Time zone: UTC-6 (Central (CST))
  - Summer (DST): UTC-5 (CDT)
- Area code: 920
- FIPS code: 55-36425
- GNIS feature ID: 1583422
- Website: humboldt-wi.gov

Humboldt is a town in Brown County in the U.S. state of Wisconsin. The population was 1,299 at the 2020 census. The community name was chosen by Henry Fontaine.

== Communities ==
- Humboldt is an unincorporated community located at the intersection of County Road N and T.
- New Franken is an unincorporated community located mostly within Humboldt along County Road T south of WIS 54. The portion north of the state highway is in the town of Scott.
- Sugar Bush is an unincorporated community located at the intersection of County Road N and Sugar Bush Road.

== Geography ==
Humboldt is in eastern Brown County and is bordered by Kewaunee County to the east and the city of Green Bay to the west and north.

According to the United States Census Bureau, the town has a total area of 24.0 square miles (62.2 km^{2}), all land.

== Demographics ==
As of the census of 2000, there were 1,338 people, 453 households, and 370 families residing in the town. The population density was 55.9 people per square mile (21.6/km^{2}). There were 460 housing units at an average density of 19.2 per square mile (7.4/km^{2}). The racial makeup of the town was 99.25% White, 0.45% Native American, 0.15% from other races, and 0.15% from two or more races. Hispanic or Latino of any race were 0.22% of the population.

There were 453 households, out of which 39.7% had children under the age of 18 living with them, 73.3% were married couples living together, 4.9% had a female householder with no husband present, and 18.3% were non-families. 15.7% of all households were made up of individuals, and 6.6% had someone living alone who was 65 years of age or older. The average household size was 2.95 and the average family size was 3.31.

In the town, the population was spread out, with 28.3% under the age of 18, 9.0% from 18 to 24, 29.4% from 25 to 44, 23.8% from 45 to 64, and 9.6% who were 65 years of age or older. The median age was 36 years. For every 100 females, there were 110.7 males. For every 100 females age 18 and over, there were 108.7 males.

The median income for a household in the town was $54,821, and the median income for a family was $60,063. Males had a median income of $38,889 versus $24,489 for females. The per capita income for the town was $19,813. About 2.3% of families and 2.2% of the population were below the poverty line, including 2.5% of those under age 18 and 4.4% of those age 65 or over.
