= Wisconsin's Brown County 2nd Assembly district =

Former American legislative district

Wisconsin's Brown County 2nd State Assembly district
- Obsolete
- Notes: 1866–1871; 1876–1972

Wisconsin's Brown County 2nd Assembly district was a district in the Wisconsin State Assembly for most of the history of the state of Wisconsin, up to the legislative redistricting reforms of 1972 which created the current numbered districts. Located in northeast Wisconsin, the district comprised parts of Brown County, Wisconsin, including all or part of the city of Green Bay.

The district was in use for Wisconsin elections from 1866 to 1871, and from 1876 to 1972.

== List of representatives ==
List of representatives from the Brown County 2nd district
Member	Party	Residence	Term start	Term end	Leg.
District created
Randall Wilcox	Dem.	De Pere	January 7, 1867	January 6, 1868	20th
David Cooper Ayres	Rep.	Fort Howard	January 6, 1868	January 4, 1869	21st
Randall Wilcox	Dem.	De Pere	January 4, 1869	January 3, 1870	22nd
Michael Dockry	Dem.	Holland	January 3, 1870	January 2, 1871	23rd
David Cooper Ayres	Rep.	Fort Howard	January 2, 1871	January 1, 1872	24th
District abolished by 1871 Wisconsin Act 156; Brown, Door, and Kewaunee counties were organized into the Brown–Door–Kewaunee 1st, Brown–Door–Kewaunee 2nd, Brown–Door–Kewaunee 3rd, and Brown–Door–Kewaunee 4th Assembly districts The Brown County 2nd district was roughly replaced by the Brown–Door–Kewaunee 2nd Assembly district
District re-established by 1876 Wisconsin Act 343
William J. Fisk	Rep.	Fort Howard	January 1, 1877	January 7, 1878	30th
David M. Burns	Dem.	Fort Howard	January 7, 1878	January 6, 1879	31st
Albert L. Gray	Gbk.	Fort Howard	January 6, 1879	January 5, 1880	32nd
David E. Sedgwick	Rep.	Wrightstown	January 5, 1880	January 3, 1881	33rd
James Rasmussen	Rep.	Fort Howard	January 3, 1881	January 2, 1882	34th
Albert L. Gray	Dem.	Fort Howard	January 2, 1882	January 1, 1883	35th
James Rasmussen	Rep.	Fort Howard	January 1, 1883	January 5, 1885	36th
Albert L. Gray	Dem.	Fort Howard	January 5, 1885	January 3, 1887	37th
Patrick Finnerty	Dem.	Wrightstown	January 3, 1887	January 7, 1889	38th
Robert J. McGeehan	Dem.	De Pere	January 7, 1889	January 2, 1893	39th 40th
Anton Van Der Heiden	Dem.	Wrightstown	January 2, 1893	January 7, 1895	41st
Timothy Burke	Rep.	Morrison	January 7, 1895	January 4, 1897	42nd
John M. Hogan	Rep.	Green Bay	January 4, 1897	January 2, 1899	43rd
Michael J. Flaherty	Dem.	Morrison	January 2, 1899	January 5, 1903	44th 45th
Joseph F. Martin	Dem.	De Pere	January 5, 1903	January 2, 1905	46th
Maurice B. Brennan	Rep.	Morrison	January 2, 1905	January 7, 1907	47th
Wallace Hager	Rep.	De Pere	January 7, 1907	January 4, 1909	48th
Lewis W. Peterson	Rep.		January 4, 1909	January 2, 1911	49th
Henry J. Janssen	Dem.	De Pere	January 2, 1911	January 6, 1913	50th
John L. Schnitzler	Rep.	De Pere	January 6, 1913	January 4, 1915	51st
Henry J. Janssen	Dem.	De Pere	January 4, 1915	January 6, 1919	52nd 53rd
Niels P. Larsen	Rep.	Denmark	January 6, 1919	January 3, 1921	54th
Gustav J. Zittlow	Rep.	Lawrence	January 3, 1921	January 7, 1929	55th 56th 57th 58th
E. F. Brunette	Dem.	Howard	January 7, 1929	January 5, 1931	59th
Gustav J. Zittlow	Rep.	West De Pere	January 5, 1931	January 2, 1933	60th
William J. Sweeney	Dem.	De Pere	January 2, 1933	January 6, 1947	61st 62nd 63rd 64th 65th 66th 67th
Harvey Larsen	Rep.	Denmark	January 6, 1947	January 3, 1949	68th
William J. Duffy	Dem.	Wrightstown	January 3, 1949	January 1, 1951	69th
Harvey Larsen	Rep.	Denmark	January 1, 1951	January 3, 1955	70th 71st
Robert E. Lynch	Dem.	Green Bay	January 3, 1955	January 5, 1959	72nd 73rd
Adolph A. Deering	Rep.	Green Bay	January 5, 1959	January 2, 1961	74th
Alexander R. Grant	Rep.	Green Bay	January 2, 1961	January 4, 1965	75th 76th
Lawrence J. Kafka	Rep.	New Denmark	January 4, 1965	January 1, 1973	77th 78th 79th 80th
District abolished by 1971 Wisconsin Act 304; Brown County was divided between the 1st, 3rd, 4th, 5th, 89th, and 90th Assembly districts The Brown County 2nd district did not have a close analogue in the new map
