= Wisconsin's Brown–Door–Kewaunee 3rd Assembly district =

Former American legislative district

Wisconsin's Brown–Door–Kewaunee 3rd State Assembly district
- Obsolete
- Notes: 1872–1876

Wisconsin's Brown–Door–Kewaunee 3rd Assembly district was a district in the Wisconsin State Assembly in the early years of the history of the state of Wisconsin, prior to the legislative redistricting reforms of 1972 which created the current numbered districts. Located in northeast Wisconsin, the district was part of a brief organization of four Assembly districts shared among Brown, Door, and Kewaunee counties; this district comprised roughly the southeast quadrant of Brown County, and the southern half of Kewaunee County. Contemporaneous documents, like the legislative manual, referred to this district as the Brown County 3rd Assembly district. (Note: Though it should not be confused with the actual Brown County 3rd Assembly district that succeeded this district.)

The district was in use for elections from 1871 through 1875 (inclusive).

== List of representatives ==
List of representatives from the Brown–Door–Kewaunee 3rd district
Member	Party	Residence	Term start	Term end	Leg.
District created by 1871 Wisconsin Act 156
Daniel Lee	Dem.	De Pere	January 1, 1872	January 6, 1873	25th
Dennis Dewane	Dem.	New Denmark	January 6, 1873	January 5, 1874	26th
Patrick Hobbins	Dem.	Holland	January 5, 1874	January 3, 1876	27th 28th
Dennis Dewane	Dem.	New Denmark	January 3, 1876	January 1, 1877	29th
District abolished by 1876 Wisconsin Act 343; Brown County was reorganized into the Brown 1st, Brown 2nd, and Brown 3rd Assembly districts Kewaunee County was consolidated as a single-county Assembly district Door County became a single-county Assembly district
