= Robert Lynch (Wisconsin politician) =

20th century American politician, baseball player, and coach

Member of the Wisconsin State Assembly
- In office January 3, 1955 – January 5, 1959
- Preceded by: Harvey Larsen
- Succeeded by: Adolph A. Deering
- Constituency: Brown 2nd district
- In office January 4, 1943 – January 3, 1955
- Preceded by: Harold A. Lytie
- Succeeded by: Jerome Quinn
- Constituency: Brown 1st district
- In office January 2, 1933 – January 4, 1937
- Preceded by: Harold C. Malchow
- Succeeded by: Harold A. Lytie
- Constituency: Brown 1st district

Personal details
- Born: Robert Emmett Lynch; July 30, 1878 Chicago, Illinois, U.S.
- Died: May 1, 1959 (aged 80) Green Bay, Wisconsin, U.S.
- Resting place: Allouez Catholic Cemetery, Green Bay
- Party: Democratic
- Spouse: Marie J. Fischer
- Children: Mary Jane (Murphy)^{(b. 1918; died 1997)}; Robert E. Lynch^{(b. 1920; died 1982)}; John Francis Lynch^{(b. 1921; died 1991)}; Eugene Michael Lynch^{(b. 1923; died 2003)}
- Education: University of Notre Dame
- Profession: Baseball player, baseball manager, salesman
- Baseball career
- Shortstop, Third baseman
- Batted: Unknown Threw: Right

Western League debut
- 1902, for the Colorado Springs Millionaires

Last Central Association appearance
- 1915, for the Marshalltown Ansons

Minor League Baseball statistics
- Games: 627
- At bats: 2,267
- Hits: 671

Teams
- As player: Colorado Springs Millionaires (1902); St. Paul Saints (1902); Atlanta Crackers (1903); Memphis Egyptians (1903); Indianapolis Indians (1904); Toronto Maple Leafs (1904); Rochester Bronchos (1904); Evansville River Rats (1905); Terre Haute Hottentots (1906); Eau Claire Tigers (1907); Fond du Lac Mudhens (1908, 1911); Green Bay Bays (1913, 1914); Marshalltown Ansons (1915); As coach: Notre Dame (1903); Clemson (1908)

Robert Emmett Lynch (July 30, 1878 – May 1, 1959) was an American baseball player and manager, salesman, and Democratic politician from Green Bay, Wisconsin. He represented Green Bay for ten terms as a member of the Wisconsin State Assembly, serving from 1933 to 1937, and then from 1943 to 1959.

== Early life and baseball career ==
Robert Emmett Lynch was born in Chicago, Illinois, in 1878, to an Irish Catholic family. He attended the University of Notre Dame and, after graduation, was hired as the baseball coach for the Notre Dame Fighting Irish. He went on to coach for Northwestern University, Northwestern Academy, and Clemson University. Between and after his years coaching, he had a 13-year career playing and managing for multiple minor league professional baseball clubs in the Wisconsin–Illinois League, the American Association, and the Western, Eastern, and Southern leagues.

== Political career ==
He settled in Green Bay, Wisconsin, where he had played two seasons of minor league baseball, and went to work as a sales manager for a building materials company. He was an active and prominent member of the Irish American and Catholic communities in Green Bay. In 1932, he was elected president of the diocesan council in the Roman Catholic Diocese of Green Bay.

Later that year, he was elected to his first term in the Wisconsin State Assembly, running on the Democratic Party ticket. He defeated one opponent in the Democratic primary and went on to defeat the incumbent, Republican Harold C. Malchow, in the November 1932 general election. At the time, his district comprised just the city of Green Bay. He served in the 61st Wisconsin Legislature and was then re-elected in 1934, defeating Republican and Progressive challengers.

In the summer of 1936, Lynch announced that he would not run for re-election and would retire from politics. He remained active in the community for the next several years.

Just six years later, however, Lynch returned to active engagement in politics after the U.S. entry into World War II. He ran to reclaim his Assembly seat in 1942, after his successor, Harold A. Lytie, announced he would instead run for Congress that year. Lynch defeated two opponents in the Democratic Primary, and went on to defeat the Republican nominee Frank Brazner, with 63% of the vote in the general election. During this Assembly term, he also became involved in the war production effort as a spokesperson for the Kewaunee Shipbuilding and Engineering Corporation. After returning to office in 1943, he was re-elected five more times in this district before the 1954 redistricting.

Under the 1954 redistricting plan, Lynch resided in the new 2nd Brown County district, which comprised roughly the eastern half of the city of Green Bay, along with two small neighboring towns. Nevertheless, Lynch won a ninth term in the new district, defeating Republican Emil Priewe with 53% of the vote in the November 1954 general election. He won one final term in 1956, receiving 55% against Republican W. Tom White.

Through his 20 years in the Assembly, he rose in the ranks of the Democratic caucus, serving as caucus chairman and assistant floor leader, and was the Democratic candidate for speaker in 1949.

He announced in June 1958 that he would not seek an eleventh term in the Assembly, suffering from declining health. At the time of his announcement, he recalled the intense loyalty of his voters, who had returned him to office so many times.

Lynch died less than a year later, on May 1, 1959.

== Personal life and family ==
Shortly after settling in Green Bay, Robert Lynch married Marie J. Fischer, who was then the private secretary to Joseph Martin, who was at that time a member of the Democratic National Committee. They were married September 12, 1917, at Eau Claire, Wisconsin. They ultimately had four children together.

Their youngest son, Eugene Michael Lynch, enlisted in the United States Army in February 1943, in the midst of World War II, and was assigned to the 14th U.S. Armored Division. He was promoted to sergeant after training and then deployed for 21 months overseas, rising to the rank of platoon sergeant before being granted a battlefield commission as a second lieutenant in March 1945. He was promoted to first lieutenant in late 1945 and earned a Purple Heart and a Silver Star after fighting in southern France, central Europe, and the Rhineland. He returned to the Army and went on to serve in the Korean War and the Vietnam War, where he earned a Distinguished Service Cross while commanding a brigade of the 25th U.S. Infantry Division in 1968. He retired as a brigadier general and was buried at Arlington National Cemetery.

== Electoral history ==
=== Wisconsin Assembly, Brown 1st district (1932, 1934) ===
Year	Election	Date	Elected				Defeated				Total	Plurality
1932	Primary	Sep. 20	Robert E. Lynch	Democratic	1,914	56.91%	Harold La Luzerne	Dem.	1,449	43.09%	3,363	465
1932	General	Nov. 8	Robert E. Lynch	Democratic	7,752	52.80%	Harold C. Malchow (inc)	Rep.	6,929	47.20%	14,681	823
1934	General	Nov. 6	Robert E. Lynch (inc)	Democratic	5,260	47.46%	Charles P. Badger	Prog.	3,255	29.37%	11,083	2,005
1934	General	Nov. 6	Robert E. Lynch (inc)	Democratic	5,260	47.46%	Earl J. Jacobs	Rep.	2,202	19.87%	11,083	2,005
1934	General	Nov. 6	Robert E. Lynch (inc)	Democratic	5,260	47.46%	Watson Lison	Soc.	169	0.16%	11,083	2,005

=== Wisconsin Assembly, Brown 1st district (1942–1952) ===
Year	Election	Date	Elected				Defeated				Total	Plurality
1942	Primary	Sep. 15	Robert E. Lynch	Democratic	1,809	51.36%	Thomas F. Clabots	Dem.	902	25.61%	3,522	907
1942	Primary	Sep. 15	Robert E. Lynch	Democratic	1,809	51.36%	Fred Tibbetts	Dem.	811	23.03%	3,522	907
1942	General	Nov. 3	Robert E. Lynch	Democratic	7,058	63.54%	Frank Brazner	Rep.	4,050	36.46%	11,108	3,008
1944	General	Nov. 7	Robert E. Lynch (inc)	Democratic	11,953	64.39%	Louis Holthausen	Rep.	6,610	35.61%	18,563	5,343
1946	General	Nov. 5	Robert E. Lynch (inc)	Democratic	10,214	58.13%	Louis Holthausen	Rep.	7,358	41.87%	17,572	2,856
1948	General	Nov. 2	Robert E. Lynch (inc)	Democratic	13,345	67.02%	Stanley Lontkowski	Rep.	6,567	32.98%	19,912	6,778
1950	Primary	Sep. 19	Robert E. Lynch (inc)	Democratic	2,911	78.55%	Jacob J. Blahnik	Dem.	795	21.45%	3,706	2,116
1950	General	Nov. 7	Robert E. Lynch (inc)	Democratic	11,096	59.86%	Peter F. Duveneck	Rep.	7,440	40.14%	18,536	3,656
1952	General	Nov. 4	Robert E. Lynch (inc)	Democratic	12,437	52.43%	Peter F. Duveneck	Rep.	11,282	47.57%	23,719	1,155

=== Wisconsin Assembly, Brown 2nd district (1954, 1956) ===
Year	Election	Date	Elected				Defeated				Total	Plurality
1954	General	Nov. 2	Robert E. Lynch	Democratic	6,512	53.77%	Emil Priewe	Rep.	5,599	46.23%	12,111	913
1956	General	Nov. 6	Robert E. Lynch (inc)	Democratic	8,597	54.55%	W. Tom White	Rep.	7,163	45.45%	15,760	1,434

Wisconsin State Assembly
Preceded by Harold C. Malchow	Member of the Wisconsin State Assembly from the Brown 1st district January 2, 1933 – January 4, 1937	Succeeded by Harold A. Lytie
Preceded by Harold A. Lytie	Member of the Wisconsin State Assembly from the Brown 1st district January 4, 1943 – January 3, 1955	Succeeded by Jerome Quinn
Preceded by Harvey Larsen	Member of the Wisconsin State Assembly from the Brown 2nd district January 3, 1955 – January 5, 1959	Succeeded by Adolph A. Deering
