= Theodorus van Berkel =

Dutch serial killer and serial rapist (1906–1982)

- Born: 6 February 1906; Uden, North Brabant, Netherlands
- Died: 21 March 1982 (aged 76); Nijmegen, Gelderland, Netherlands
- Resting place: Jonkerbos Cemetery (unmarked grave)
- Other names: "De Kindervriend" (English: The Children's Friend); Theodore van Berkel "Ted" "De Amerikaan" (English: The American) "Uncle Theo"
- Convictions: United States: Rape; Various other charges Netherlands: Manslaughter x2
- Penalty: United States: 15 years imprisonment with hard labor (rape charges); Netherlands: 15 years imprisonment (Remken); 15 years imprisonment with forensic psychiatric care (Hermans)

Details
- Victims: 3–5 (2 convictions)
- Span of crimes: 1940 (suspected); 1941 – 1960
- Country: Netherlands
- States: North Brabant, Limburg
- Date apprehended: For the final time on 10 October 1960

Theodorus "Ted" van Berkel (6 February 1906 – 21 March 1982), anglicized as Theodore van Berkel, was a Dutch serial killer, serial rapist and child molester who committed a series of crimes in the United States and the Netherlands. After being deported from the US for several rapes committed in the 1930s, Van Berkel raped and murdered two young girls in 1941, but was convicted of for crimes against only one and imprisoned for 15 years.

After his release, Van Berkel killed a young boy in 1960, after which he was sentenced to another 15-year prison term. During his incarceration, he confessed to his previous murder after the statute of limitations had passed, and was reportedly considered a suspect in a similar double murder from 1940.

After his security period expired, Van Berkel was released in 1981, dying a few months later at a homeless shelter.

== Early life ==
Theodorus van Berkel was born in Uden on 6 February 1906, as one of six children born to merchant Marinus van Berkel and his wife Helena "Leen" Henraat. The family grew up in the Kreppeneind slum, with Theodorus' dad rarely attending to them due to his nomadic lifestyle and frequent incarcerations for various violent crimes. Later rumors suggested that Marinus often beat his wife and children, with Theodorus in particular witnessing him engage in sexual acts and himself being abused at a young age by one of his dad's younger sex partners – however, none of this has been definitively verified.

At around the age of ten, Theodorus started skipping school along with his eldest brother Louis, as a result of which the pair were eventually sent off to a monastery belonging to the Brotherhood Congregation of Our Lady of Seven Sorrows (Dutch: Broedercongregatie Onze-Lieve-Vrouw van Zeven Smarten), situated in Heythuysen. By the mid-1920s, Marinus, who had come a considerable number of enemies due to his criminal activities, decided to leave the Netherlands altogether and immigrate to America with his family.

=== Move to the United States ===
On 21 April 1920, the Van Berkel family immigrated to the United States aboard the steamship SS Lapland, settling in St. Louis, Missouri. Shortly after their move, Theodorus – known by the nickname "Ted" – began working as a mechanic and metalworker at the Raywond & Wright Experimental Works Special Machining Plant, where he would remain until 1927.

Despite moving to a new country and having a stable job, the family situation at home did not improve, prompting both Theodorus and Louis to flee in the autumn of 1922 after several violent outbursts at the hands of their father. The two brothers wandered around the Midwest via trainhopping, and started committing crimes along the way.

=== Initial crimes ===
The brothers' first recorded crime took place in October 1922, when they were caught in Indiana for stealing a pump truck and imprisoned. The pair were released on 4 December of that year after the brothers' employer that the boys would not get into trouble any more and would return to work at his factory. However, Theodorus would wander off yet again, and continued to commit various crimes.

In December 1923, he was detained for on a robbery charge, but was released due to a lack of evidence. Less than a month later, on 9 January 1924, he was incarcerated for theft, but managed to escape only four days later along with three other juvenile offenders after jumping out of a third-floor window. Theodorus' next arrest was on 6 July 1925 on a rape charge, but was released on the next day due to a lack of evidence. On 17 December of that year, he was arrested in St. Louis for robbery, but as there was not enough evidence to charge with that, he instead received a one-month sentence for vagrancy.

In early 1927, Van Berkel was in Chicago, Illinois, when he met a woman named Anna Tomes, an immigrant from Moravské Lieskové, Austria-Hungary. The pair married only a couple of months later on 16 July in Lake County, Indiana, with Anna becoming pregnant shortly after their wedding. In spite of the fact that his wife was pregnant, Theodorus continued committing crimes with Louis, as on 6 December of that year, the pair were arrested for committing three burglaries in Fond du Lac, Wisconsin. Both of the brothers were incarcerated, and while he was still in prison, Anna gave birth to a boy named Theodore Walter van Berkel, who was also given the nickname "Ted". On 29 July 1929, Theodorus was released from the reformatory in Fond du Lac.

=== Sexual assaults in Wisconsin ===
On 3 July 1930, Van Berkel was in Green Bay when he abducted 19-year-old Florence Stein at knifepoint while she walking home. He then drove to an isolated section of the nearby woods and raped her in the back of his Essex, before dropping her off in nearby De Pere, binding her hands and feet. At some point, he changed his mind and returned, untied Stein and drove back within a few blocks of her home, threatening to kill her if she told anyone about the ordeal.

Instead, Stein told everything to her mother, who then contacted local police about the rape. As a result, police quickly identified the assailant as Van Berkel and issued an arrest warrant for him. Two days after the warrant was issued, Van Berkel was caught in Cudahy and extradited to Green Bay to stand trial on the rape charge.

While Van Berkel protested his innocence, Stein confirmed that he was indeed her assailant, leading to him being charged and held on $2,000 bail. In the meantime, authorities from Milwaukee stated that they were investigating him for three rapes committed against young girls in their city the week prior to Van Berkel's capture. At the time, the father of one of the 9-year-old girls had organized a posse to hunt down the rapist and supposedly threatened to kill him if caught.

=== First prison escape and capture ===
Van Berkel's trial for the Stein rape was scheduled to take place on 6 August, after he failed to pay off his bail. On 30 July, Van Berkel used a small metal saw hidden in his shoe to saw through the cell's bars and escaped from prison, leading to a state-wide manhunt.

Just two days later, two farmers from Rockland reported to sheriffs that they had spotted what appeared to be Van Berkel hiding in some shrubbery behind the farm of a man named Francis Thomas. They claimed that the man was seen with a fruit basket containing some partially eaten food, some matches, and a water bottle, with another local woman confirming that she had seen that same man claiming that he was fishing for minnows in the nearby Devil River.

An ambush was set in the designated spot, with the hopes that Van Berkel would return. In the meantime, sheriffs learned that he and Thomas were acquaintances, as they met while in the reformatory, where they both worked in the machine shop. After Thomas returned from a family vacation in Greenleaf, he was questioned by Sheriff William Nickolai, but claimed to have no knowledge about the case.

Once the cache of food was found near his farm, Nickolai and Assistant District Attorney Cletus Chadek decided to question Thomas again. During the questioning, Nickolai asked for a match, with Thomas giving him one that matched those found at the stash belonging to Van Berkel. Once he was called out for his lies, Thomas agreed to show where his friend was hiding, but after he finished his lunch. Sheriff Nickolai then left to retrieve two other officers stationed at the hideout to help out, while Chadek stayed behind with Thomas.

At some point, Chadek noticed that Thomas appeared to be stalling, after which he ordered him to show where Van Berkel was hiding. Thomas then guided him to an oat field behind the farm, where Chadek commanded him to signal Van Berkel to come out of hiding. Although initially hesitant to do so, Thomas relented, prompting Van Berkel to pop his head out from his hiding place. Chadek then took out his gun and ordered him to surrender, but Van Berkel refused, attempting to run away.

Chadek then fired in his direction, causing Van Berkel to stop, turn around, and run in his direction. Chadek then fired at his feet, forcing him to kneel, but Van Berkel refused to lie down. Chadek then ordered the two men to go towards the road at gunpoint, with Van Berkel bargaining for a plea deal along the way. At one point, he attempted to approach the officer, ostensibly to shake his hand, but Chadek fired a third shot between his ankles, prompting him to back away. The trio eventually reached the road, where Van Berkel and Thomas were taken into custody by Nickolai and the other two officers.

==== Investigation and convictions ====
At the police station, Van Berkel was initially reluctant to confess, but then admitted that he had been given the saw by six vagrants he had met at the county jail. When asked about how he managed to escape, he admitted that a trusty named Fred Desmond brought him a piece of a pipe that he used to bend the cell's bars. Van Berkel then crawled out of the cell and waited for the area to be deserted, then simply walked out and telephoned Thomas from a store to come pick him up.

In his version of the story, Thomas claimed that he had picked up Van Berkel from the St. Vincent Hospital, assuming that he had paid his bail bond. Once he questioned him about that in the car, Van Berkel simply shook his head, prompting Thomas to tell him to get out. Supposedly, Van Berkel then said that he had a gas pipe with him and forced him to continue driving towards his farm. There, Thomas said that he only provided with him two loaves of bread and some matches, after which he left him to fend for himself. As for Desmond, he denied any involvement, claiming that he had simply gone to deliver food to Van Berkel as instructed, and that he was wrongfully accused.

For their roles in the escape, Thomas pleaded guilty to harboring a fugitive and concealing a felon, for which he was fined $200 and given an alternative option of spending 60 days at the reformatory. Desmond, who was on probation for a burglary change, had his probation revoked and a stayed sentence of two years imprisonment imposed. Desmond's attorney attempted to argue that the only real evidence against his client was Van Berkel's own claims, but this was dismissed, and Desmond was then transferred to serve his sentence at the Waupun State Prison.

Van Berkel was placed behind three locked doors on the jail's second floor, while the cell he had sawed through was covered with heavy wire netting to prevent any objects from being passed through.

=== Second prison escape ===
Van Berkel's rape trial was scheduled to begin on 18 August. On that very morning, however, he used a second saw hidden in the soles of his shoes to saw through the bars of his cell, escaping together with another inmate named Joseph B. Neale, who was detained on a robbery charge. The pair separated shortly after escaping from the jail, but were reunited later that day on the west side of Green Bay and decided to stick together for some time before separating again.

After learning of the escape, a posse of more than 100 volunteers were organized in order to capture the fugitives, with Sheriff Nickolai using a helicopter to search from above. In the meantime, highway patrols were set up, with the volunteers being veterans from the United States Army who were equipped with rifles. The escape attracted the attention of many spectators who wanted to help search for the two men – among them were Van Berkel's own family members, who had traveled from St. Louis to attend Theodorus' trial. At some point during the day, Marinus van Berkel even pleaded with a sergeant at the sheriff's office for the safe capture of his son, promising that he would have him returned to the Netherlands.

Less than a day after the prisoners escaped, sheriffs received a tip from Lawrence that two men were seen walking along a railroad track to the northwest. An officer named Clarence Grognet was the first to receive the tip, after which he contacted Sheriff Nickolai. Together with two volunteers, the four men traveled to a farm near Little Rapids, where they climbed on top of a hill to get a better view of the land. Using a scope, they spotted Neale walking near the road. They then drove ahead of him and organized an ambush, during which Neale surrendered without incident. When questioned about Van Berkel's whereabouts, Neale claimed that they had separated just minutes prior and that his accomplice seemed to be heading in the direction of State Highway 41.

The search continued using the information provided by Neale, with volunteers being stationed in positions where they suspected Van Berkel would pass through. This included a nearby cornfield, to where Van Berkel's father traveled to see if his son was there, but this lead turned out to be false. One of these men was Deputuy Sheriff H. H. Bartelt, who was stationed at the Badger Inn on the border with Outagamie County, where he was stationed to overlook a wooded gully. At approximately 9 o'clock, two 14-year-old boys approached Bartelt and said that they had seen a man sitting down in the gully, after which Bartelt went with them to check. There, he spotted the barefooted Van Berkel eating food.

Once he approached him, Van Berkel raised his hands and surrendered without resistance. However, when he asked if he could put on his shoes, Bartelt refused – when he inspected his shoes, he noticed the false inner soles used to hide the saws used in the prison escape. Bartelt then escorted him to the Badger Inn, where Van Berkel was put into a police car and driven to the county jail. After the capture, Sheriff Nickolai expressed gratitude to the citizens of all the towns, agencies, and counties involved for their cooperation in the search. He also stated that he would put a prison officer to keep watch over the two escapees, and that nobody would be permitted to see them.

=== Trial and imprisonment ===
On the following day, Van Berkel's trial for the rape of Florence Stein resumed. During the proceedings, he served as the only witness in his defense, claiming that he had been working during the day and later visited his parents in Wrightstown during the evening.

These claims were rebutted by multiple witnesses brought forward by the prosecution, who indicated that Van Berkel was not at the places he indicated during his testimony. In addition, prosecutors brought forward numerous pieces of evidence that contradicted his claims, including the fact that Stein's name had been scratched onto his car's dashboard, as she originally claimed in her allegations to the police.

Due to the overwhelming amount of evidence against him, Van Berkel was found guilty and sentenced to serve 15 years imprisonment with hard labor, with his first day being spent in solitary confinement. The only notable reaction from Van Berkel was that he appeared to momentarily lose composure as he was escorted away, but quickly came back to his senses.

On the day after the conviction, he started boasting to officers that he planned to escape from Waupun State Prison, as a result of which a prison guard was assigned to watch over him in case he did attempt to escape or commit suicide. Instead, Van Berkel continued boasting about his previous prison escapes, but nonetheless expressed an admiration for Sheriff Nickolai and seeming regret for putting him through all the trouble.

The trial garned the attention of many Green Bay locals, so much so that a newspaper article pointed out that many had gathered to watch the trial as if it was some sort of spectacle, with the majority being women.

=== Deportation and move to Tilburg ===
For the next nine years, Van Berkel served his sentence at the Waupun State Prison without any notable incidents. In 1937, he filed an application for a commutation of his sentence, which was denied by Governor Robert M. La Follette Jr..

On 2 June 1939, Van Berkel was granted a pardon and released from prison. Three days later, he was handed over to the INS in Chicago, as his parents never applied him for naturalization and he was never granted American citizenship. As a result, Van Berkel was ordered to be deported, and was placed on the SS President Harding bound for Hamburg, Nazi Germany. From there, he traveled through Bentheim County and into Oldenzaal, from which he eventually arrived in his birthplace of Uden on 18 June 1939.

Van Berkel then worked in a series of odd jobs before moving in with his aunt Theodora de Kort-Henraat in Tilburg's Bosscheweg neighborhood on 6 July 1940.

After his arrival in Tilburg, Van Berkel became popular with the residents of Bosscheweg, especially with younger women, due to his good looks and tales of his life in America. He was known to often treated girlfriends to new dresses and provide them with large sums of money, and was well-liked among children as he often bought them ice cream and played games with them.

One of his girlfriends was 17-year-old Corrie Pagie, a textile spinner, whom started dating him in July 1940. Through her, Van Berkel got acquainted with the Pagie family, but was eventually dumped by Corrie after she found out about his numerous affairs.

== Murders of Ria Pagie and Annie Remken ==
On 15 August 1941, 10-year-old Marietje "Ria" Pagie, Corrie's younger sister, suddenly vanished after leaving her parents' home. Her disappearance was reported in Nieuwe Tilburgsche Courant four days later. After more than a week of searching by detectives and volunteers alike, they were unable to find any trace of Pagie, who was last seen by a teenage girl walking along the Heuvel market, carrying ten-cent coins that she had obtained through unknown means. Locals speculated early on that she might have been abducted by someone, but these were dismissed as baseless rumors. Reportedly, Van Berkel offered to aid in the search, but his offer was denied.

Two weeks later, on 29 August, 13-year-old Annie Remken, who was staying at the Balsvoort farm near Oisterwijk with her family, who were on holiday from Rotterdam. On that day, the family was staying at another farm and were planning to return to Balsvoort to prepare their belongings for their upcoming trip back to Rotterdam, with Annie deciding to ride her bicycle ahead of them. Approximately half an hour later, her parents arrived at Balsvoort with her younger brother, but she was nowhere to be seen. Assuming that she had gone to pick some flowers, the parents continued preparing their belongings, but another half-hour had passed, they became concerned and started looking for her.

After searching for approximately two hours, the parents found Remken's body in an isolated lane near the Balsvoort farm. She had been evidently raped and strangled, with a man's bicycle being found near her body. Initially, it was assumed that the killer was frightened off and fled on Remken's bicycle, but it was later found in a nearby area, leading investigators to conclude that he likely fled on foot.

=== Arrest and investigation ===
Among the detectives dispatched to examine the crime scene was an inspector named Jan Stevens, who was previously involved with investigating the disappearance of Pagie. Unbeknownst to the public at the time, he had ordered his men to watch Van Berkel's movements for the past couple of weeks, as his interactions with children and strange behavior before and after the disappearance made him a possible suspect in that case.

Once he examined the bike left behind at the Remken crime scene, it was determined that the handlebars were handmade and welded with considerable skill. This, combined with the fact that Van Berkel was confirmed to have sold a little girls' bicycle not too long ago, convinced Stevens that he should be interrogated. As a result, his house was surrounded by detectives and Van Berkel was taken into custody, where he steadfastly denied involvement in the crime.

However, officers searching through his home after the detention found several pieces of circumstantial evidence pointing towards his guilt, such as his missing bicycle and jacket. It was also learned that he had requested a day off from work at the day Remken disappeared, and that his aunt had given him several sandwiches that were tied to his bicycle – the same as the ones found on the perpetrator's bicycle. This, coupled with his contradictory statements and the fact that he was known for his interactions with children, lead authorities to charge him with Remken's death.

During the investigation, Van Berkel insisted that he was innocent, even when he was forced to accompany detectives to the Remken crime scene. In the meantime, rumors started circulating when the locals learned of his criminal record in the USA, with some accusing him of killing children prior to his arrival in Tilburg.

==== Discovery of Pagie's body ====
On 15 October, the public prosecutor in Breda offered a reward of 5,000 guilders for any information that could lead to the discovery of Ria Pagie's body.

On 25 October, a group of several police detectives with police dogs and five civilians conducted a search in the Udenhout Dunes in the hope of locating something that could led them to the discovery of Pagie. Among them was a game warden named J. A. Hommer, who noticed a small blue child's shoe sticking out of some bushes on a private estate near Berkel-Enschot. Upon closer inspection, he found the decomposing body of a young girl. While the other searchers cordoned off the area, Hommer called the police and led them to the crime scene – among them were Jan Stevens, who, along with his colleagues, identified the body as that of Pagie due to her acorn-shaped earrings, floral dress, and the blue shoes.

Four days later, without being notified prior, Van Berkel was brought to the crime scene by detectives in an attempt to make him confess to the murder, but this seemingly had no result. On 1 November, Pagie's body was buried at the Tilburg cemetery, with many locals attending the burial ceremony.

On 4 April 1942, a small monument was erected in Pagie's name at the place where she was found. The funds for the monument were gathered following an organized effort by readers of the Nieuwe Tilburgsche Courant.

=== Prosecution for Remken murder ===
Due to the fact that the prosecutors lacked enough evidence to charge in Pagie's murder, Van Berkel was instead charged with the rape and murder of Remken. Due to the crime's nature, it was decided that the trial would be conducted in camera, much to the apparent relief of the defendant, who appeared visibly nervous throughout the ordeal.

On 3 March 1943, Van Berkel was convicted on a manslaughter charge by the District Court of Breda, who then sentenced him to 15 years imprisonment. This ruling was immediately appealed by both his lawyers and the prosecution, who had requested a life sentence. At these proceedings, Van Berkel repeatedly claimed that his bicycle had been stolen and that he was not in the area when Remken had been killed, all the while attempting to rebuke the prosecutors' arguments. After hearing arguments from both sides, the trial was adjourned, with the Court of Appeal deciding to refer the case back to the examining magistrate for further investigation.

On 2 June, the Court of Appeal concluded its investigation and officially sentenced Van Berkel to 15 years imprisonment, despite the Attorney General of Breda's repeated arguments in favor of a life sentence. Van Berkel filed an appeal against the sentence on the following day, but it was denied at some later point in time.

=== Incarceration and parole ===
After the Supreme Court denied his final appeal on 13 July 1946, Van Berkel was ordered to serve the remainder of his sentence at the Leeuwarden Penal Prison. During his time there, he was considered a model prisoner and maintained good relations with the director, even offering his skills as a mechanic to train young delinquents. After yet another sentence reduction, Van Berkel was paroled on 12 September 1955 following an order by Minister of Justice Leen Donker.

He was ordered to be placed under supervision by a Roman Catholic institution in Helden, while Van Berkel resided in various locations around Limburg. The supervision order was eventually lifted, as it was decided that he no longer posed a danger to those around him. Van Berkel then settled at a boarding house in the village of Belfeld and found work at the "De Globe" iron foundry in Tegelen. Similarly to his time in Tilburg, he gained a reputation for treating children to ice cream at least twice a day, earning him the nickname "De Kindervriend" (Dutch: The Children's Friend).

== Murder of Hansje Hermans ==
=== Location of body and investigation ===
On 11 September 1960, 11-year-old Hans "Hansje" Hermans decided to cycle from his home in Evertsoord to his uncle's hamlet in an isolated part of rural Sevenum to deliver him a small saw. When he failed to arrive at his destination, he was reported missing, and a large contingent of officers and soldiers began a search to locate the missing boy.

Three days later, a soldier spotted a freshly-dug grave in an asparagus field on the road between Sevenum and Helenaveen, after which he immediately started digging. He then noticed that a partially-undressed body of what appeared to be a young boy inside, after which he stopped digging to avoid destroying any evidence. An autopsy positively identified the body as Hermans, with the cause of death being listed as strangulation due to the location of a thin rope around his neck.

A day after the discovery, investigators located a small saw in the nearby village of Reusel, similar to one that was missing from Hermans' bicycle. As none of his other belongings – two small flags and a wallet containing 1.50 euros – could be located in the area, a search was called off, with some being skeptical if the item actually belonged to the murdered boy or not. On the following day, the authorities stated that the saw located did not belong to Hermans. On that same day, he was buried.

On 19 September, a 25-year-old farmer working the soil on his father's asparagus plantation noticed what appeared to be two small plastic red flags, identical to the ones missing from Hermans' bicycle. The farmer immediately notified the police, who went to the plantation and retrieved not only the flags, but also the saw, all three of which were buried only centimeters below the ground close to one another.

=== Rumors and suspects ===
Following the discovery of Hermans' items, numerous theories and rumors began spreading about who the killer could be and what his motive was. This was prompted by the actions of a district commander of the police in Roermond, who had requested a list of all known mentally-disturbed sex offenders who were either under supervision in the area. In total, the media reported that at least 70 such men lived close in the province, with at least twenty of them labeled as capable of resuming their criminal activities.

While they were interviewing potential suspects, local authorities also suggested the possibility that Hermans was in fact not the victim of a sexual predator, but possibly a mentally-ill poacher or vagrant.

=== Van Berkel's arrest ===
On 10 October 1960, Van Berkel was detained for questioning in the Hermans case and transferred to a police outpost outside of Roermond. There, he denied any responsibility for the crime, but accidentally made several statements that showed he knew more than he claimed, such as saying that Hermans had been hit on the head with a blunt instrument prior to being strangled – a fact not released in the papers at the time. Additional pieces of evidence included the fact that he owned a red scooter similar to one reported being seen in the area after Hermans' murder, and that he had a coal shovel that could have been used to dig the shallow grave. By this time, newspapers had already uncovered his criminal past and noted similarities between Remken's murder and this case.

While he admitted responsibility for at least ten incidents of child molestation in Belfeld and the surrounding area, Van Berkel steadfastly maintained that he had nothing to do with Hermans' murder. He claimed on that day of the murder, he had gone with his scooter to Roermond and then to a fair in Baarlo, but this account was contradicted by at least four witnesses, all of whom placed him in the vicinity of Sevenum. Additional circumstantial evidence for his guilt came from the fact that when he was placed in a lineup with other random men, a sniffer dog – which had picked up the scent of the coal shovel that was likely used in the murder – pointed towards Van Berkel on three separate occasions.

After exhausting all possible leads and alternative suspects, the authorities extradited Van Berkel to Roermond, where he was charged with the murder of Hansje Hermans. Following the indictment, Public Prosecutor C. W. van Uiterwaal stated at a press conference that he was fully convinced that Van Berkel was responsible, and that he permanently removed from society due to the danger he posed to others.

=== Confession ===
On 19 October, Van Berkel contacted the investigators, stating that he wished to make a statement. During his conversation with them, he finally admitted to killing Hermans, providing a detailed account of how he had done it.

In his confession, Van Berkel stated that on the day of the murder, he had parked his red scooter in a small pine grove and decided to go on a walk through the woods. After walking for a little bit, he encountered Hermans by chance and called out to him. Once Hermans approached him, Van Berkel propositioned him to do some sexual acts, which the young boy rejected and prepared himself to flee. Van Berkel then grabbed him, but Hansje broke free and started running. However, he then hit his head on a nearby tree and fell down, attempting to crawl away while Van Berkel attempted to stop him. Van Berkel then pounced on him, with Hermans resisting fiercely, only for the older man to strangle him using his bare hands.

Mere moments after killing Hermans, Van Berkel was startled by the sound of some children who were approaching him. Fearing that they had seen him, he accidentally went in their direction out of panic and considered killing them as well, but then realized that they were calling for help. Van Berkel then stated that one of the children had stepped on a shard of broken glass and was bleeding, prompting him to tie a handkerchief around the wound and tell them to run back home, or the child would die of blood poisoning. After making sure that the children were out of sight, he then dragged Hermans' body to the pine grove, got on his scooter, and started driving around to calm down.

After calming down, he decided to hide his tracks. He first went to Tegelen and took the coal shovel from an acquaintance, which he used to dig a small hole in the asparagus field, where he buried the small flags that had fallen out of Hermans' bicycle. At night, he buried the body on the other side of the field in a shallow grave. When asked about the injury on the back of the boy's head, Van Berkel stated that he was not responsible for that, leading to speculation that it was due to the impact from Hermans hitting himself on the tree while running away.

=== Arraignment and petitions ===
On the following day, Van Berkel was returned to Sevenum to enact a reconstruction of the crime scene. When he arrived, the majority of the townsfolk had gathered to see him arrive – among the crowd were the three children he had helped, and once they saw him, they all pointed and confirmed that he was the man who had helped them on that day. After this, Hansje's parents gave an interview in the press in which they said that a burden had been lifted from their shoulders, and that they had started suspecting that "The Lodger", as they called Van Berkel, was hiding something due to his strange behavior after their son's murder.

The case also prompted a concerned mother from Venlo to write a letter to Minister of Justice Albert Beerman stating that the government in faultering in its duty to protect children and should enact stricter measures concerning sex offenders. The petition received support from across the country, with people rallying to persuade others to gather enough signatures for it to be considered for a change in the laws. The mother, Mrs. Dommeck-van Geert, was eventually granted an audience with Beerman, who tried to alleviate her concerns and promised to read through all the letters that had been sent to his office.

=== Trial and sentence ===
On 22 October, Van Berkel was transferred to a psychiatric clinic in Utrecht to undergo a forensic psychiatric evaluation prior to his trial. After he was found sane to stand trial, was scheduled to have his first court hearing in early June 1961. The beginning of his trial was then set for 3 October, with the trial being held in camera due to the sexual nature of the murder.

At the trial, prosecutor Van Uiterwaal demanded a maximum sentence of 15 years imprisonment on an aggravated manslaughter charge and the three counts of child molestation, after he agreed to drop the charge of premeditated murder due to the circumstances of the case. Throughout the proceedings, Van Berkel appeared distressed, occasionally cried and repeatedly expressed remorse for his crimes, stating that he had no intent of killing the boy.

On 17 October, the court convinced Van Berkel on the manslaughter charge and sentenced him to 15 years imprisonment as recommended by the prosecutor. He later filed an appeal against the sentence on 31 October, but withdrew it on 19 1967. He was then transferred to the Leeuwarden penal prison to serve out his sentence.

== Later life and death ==
On 18 March 1963, Hansje Hermans' father and his horse were killed in a lightning strike following a brief but violent thunderstorm.

Starting from 2 August 1967, Van Berkel started receiving treatment at a psychiatric facility in Balkbrug. During his time there, he repeatedly confessed to killing all three children, including Pagie, but would just as quickly retract his confessions. During that year, he was also accused as a possible alternative suspect in the 1940 double murder of 12-year-old Jan van Hout and 7-year-old Josie, who were found dead under some brushes in Mierlo. This came after prosecutors decided that the original suspect, farmer Jan Berends, would not be prosecuted further due to a lack of evidence. Berends, who had emigrated to Canada at the time, later moved his family to Australia, where he remained until his death. Both murders remain cold cases.

As his security period was not extended beyond 29 May 1981, Van Berkel was released and placed at a homeless shelter in Nijmegen. There, he lived a life in obscurity until his death of natural causes on 21 March 1982. He was then buried in an unnamed grave at the Jonkerbos Cemetery.

== Aftermath ==
In January 2022, Oisterwijk-based historian Ad van den Oord announced that he was working on a documentary covering the life and crimes of Van Berkel. In an interview provided to Brabants Dagblad, Van den Oord states that Van Berkel definitively confessed to killing Pagie back in 1975 to inspector Jan Blaauw, who detailed the crime in his own book. Van den Oord also expressed his hope that he several important files pertinent to the case had been lost during a bombing raid in 1945, and that official reports from the police in Tilburg were missing.

In January 2023, the documentary was released, as well as a book detailing the case.

== See also ==
- List of serial killers by country
- List of serial rapists
- Cold case
- List of prison escapes

== Books ==
- van den Oord, Ad (2023). De kindervriend. De moord op twee meisjes in de Oisterwijkse bossen [The Children's Friend: The Murder of Two Girls in the Oisterwijk Woods] (in Dutch). Het Kwartier van Oisterwijk. ISBN 978-90-832014-3-6.
