= Daniel Lee (politician) =

American politician (born 1830)

Daniel Lee was an American mason and builder who spent a single one-year term as a member of the Wisconsin State Assembly from the 3rd District of Brown County, Wisconsin during the 1872 session (the 25th Wisconsin Legislature).

== Background ==
Lee was born in Little Falls, New York on March 19, 1830. He received a public school education, and became a mason and builder. He first came to Wisconsin in 1847; then went to California in 1850. After four years there, he returned to Wisconsin in 1855, settling at Waukesha.

== Public service ==
Lee was elected sheriff of Calumet County, Wisconsin in 1862 and appointed Undersheriff in 1865. He was elected in 1871 as a Democrat for a new district, nominally the 3rd Brown County Assembly district, which included the Village of De Pere, and the Towns of De Pere, Glenmore, Holland, Morrison, New Denmark and Rockland in Brown County, plus the Towns of Carlton, Franklin and Montpelier, in Kewaunee County. He received 780 votes, against 306 for Republican Jonas Leroy. He was not a candidate in the next election, and was succeeded by fellow Democrat Dennis Dewane. He later spent a two-year term (1877–78) as Sheriff of Brown County.
