= Little Rapids =

Little Rapids may refer to:

- Little Rapids, Newfoundland and Labrador
- Little Rapids, Ontario
- Little Rapids, Wisconsin
