= Askeaton (disambiguation) =

Askeaton may refer to:

- Askeaton, a town in County Limerick, Ireland
- Askeaton, Wisconsin, an unincorporated community
- Askeaton (Parliament of Ireland constituency), a constituency in the Irish House of Commons.
