= East River (Wisconsin) =

River in the U.S. state of Wisconsin

East River Devil River
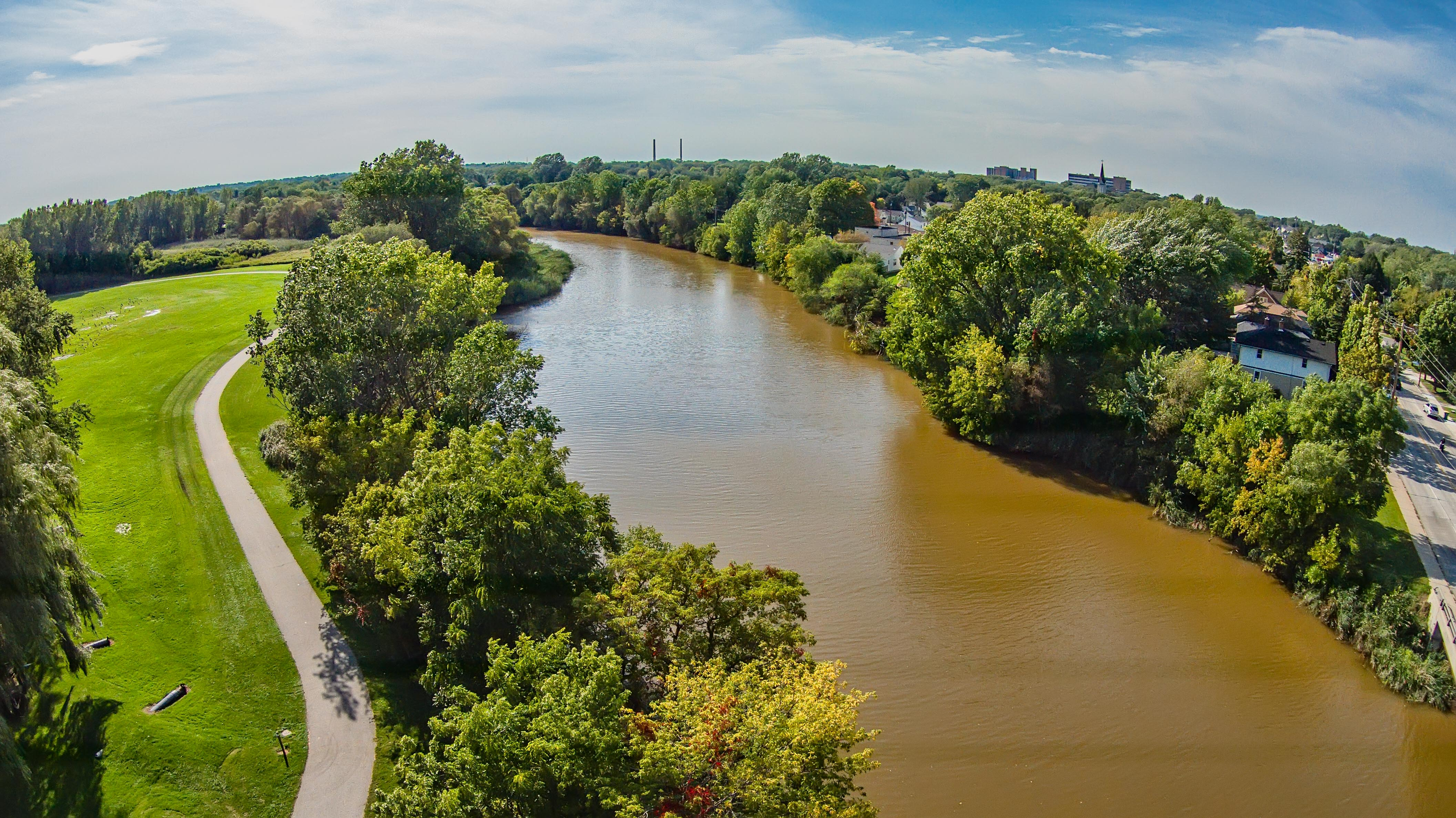
- Looking south where the East River crosses Mason Street in Green Bay.

- Location within Wisconsin Location within the United States

Location
- Country: United States
- State: Wisconsin

Physical characteristics
- Source: Near Askeaton
  - coordinates: 44.2694357°N 88.0634334°W
- Mouth: Fox River
  - location: Green Bay
  - coordinates: 44.5211035°N 88.0095483°W
  - elevation: 577 ft (176 m)
- Length: 42.4 miles (68.2 km)

Basin features
- Tributaries
  - right: Bower Creek

The East River (known earlier as the Devil River) is a 42.4-mile-long (68.2 km) river in the U.S. state of Wisconsin. It is a tributary of the Fox River.

The East River begins near Askeaton in southern Brown County and flows through the east side of De Pere, Allouez and Green Bay, Wisconsin, where it converges with the Fox River.

The river runs near the Green Bay East High School. The school's athletic teams are the Red Devils, taking their name from the former name of the river.

== History ==
In the river's early days, it was known as the Devil River. The Devil River played an important part in the European settlement of Brown County. When Brown County was first surveyed in 1820, the Devil River formed part of the boundary of the surveyed area. Second Lieutenant Jefferson Davis was stationed at nearby Fort Winnebago from 1829 to 1831. He went deer hunting on a boat on the Devil River and nearly drowned before his companion saved him. The settlement of Navarino was established on the river's banks in 1830. During the Black Hawk War of 1832, the river formed one of the defensive boundaries of American forces in Brown County. In the early 1840s, it is alleged that Colonel Zachary Taylor tried to cross the Devil River during a spring flood. The rushing water swept him off his horse, and he was rescued by his fellow soldiers.
