= Wisconsin's Brown County 3rd Assembly district =

Former American legislative district

Wisconsin's Brown County 3rd State Assembly district
- Obsolete
- Notes: 1876–1882; 1954–1972

Wisconsin's Brown County 3rd Assembly district was a district in the Wisconsin State Assembly for several years in the history of the state of Wisconsin, prior to the legislative redistricting reforms of 1972 which created the current numbered districts. Located in northeast Wisconsin, the district comprised parts of Brown County, Wisconsin.

In its original configuration, for elections between 1876 and 1881, the district served the southern and eastern areas of Brown County. In its second configuration, from 1954 to 1963, the district served nearly all of Brown County outside of the city of Green Bay. In its final configuration, from 1963 to 1972, the district served the northern and western parts of the county, including coastal areas within the city of Green Bay.

From 1876 to 1881, and from 1954 to 1963, the Brown County 3rd district was located within the 2nd Senate district, alongside the Brown 1st and Brown 2nd districts. From 1963 to 1972, the Brown County 3rd district was located within the 30th Senate district, alongside the Florence–Marinette district and Langlade–Oconto district.

== History ==
Brown County first expanded to three Assembly districts in the 1871 redistricting plan (1871 Wisc. Act 156), which experimented with crossing county boundaries to more equitably allocate four state Assembly districts among the three counties of Brown, Door, and Kewaunee. The Brown–Door–Kewaunee 3rd district then comprised the southern and eastern parts of Brown County along with the southern half of Kewaunee County. The next redistricting (1876 Wisc. Act 343) eliminated those shared districts, and established this district—the Brown County 3rd Assembly district—for the first time. Under that initial configuration, the Brown 3rd district comprised roughly the southeast quadrant of the county; that configuration was relatively brief, however, and in 1882 (1882 Wisc. Act 242), the 3rd district was eliminated as Brown County was reduced to two districts.

Brown County did not regain the 3rd district until 1954, when the Rosenberry redistricting plan (1951 Wisc. Act 728) was implemented by court order. Under the 1954 plan, the 3rd district comprised nearly all the territory of Brown County, except for the city of Green Bay, the village of Allouez, and the town of Bellevue. The districts were next adjusted by the 1964 court-ordered redistricting resulting from the Wisconsin Supreme Court decision State ex rel. Reynolds v. Zimmerman (23 Wis. 2d 606). Under the 1964 plan, the 3rd district moved to the northeast part of Brown County, including the towns of Ashwaubenon, Hobart, Lawrence, Pittsfield, Preble, Scott and Suamico, the villages of Howard and Pulaski, and the northern coastal wards of the city of Green Bay. Those districts remained until the 1972 redistricting (1971 Wisc. Act 304), which significantly redefined the rules of legislative redistricting in Wisconsin and abolished all county-based districts.

The district was last represented by Democrat Cletus J. Vanderperren, who represented the district from 1959 to 1973. The district was roughly succeeded by the 89th assembly district, which Vanderperren went on to represent after the 1972 election.

== List of representatives ==
List of representatives from the Brown County 3rd district
Member	Party	Residence	Term start	Term end	Leg.
District created
Michael J. Touhey	Dem.	Morrison	January 1, 1877	January 7, 1878	30th
William Rice	Dem.	Morrison	January 7, 1878	January 6, 1879	31st
John O'Flaherty	Dem.	Morrison	January 6, 1879	January 5, 1880	32nd
Chester G. Wilcox	Dem.	De Pere	January 5, 1880	January 3, 1881	33rd
Maurice B. Brennan	Dem.	Morrison	January 3, 1881	January 2, 1882	34th
Patrick H. Moran	Dem.	Morrison	January 2, 1882	January 1, 1883	35th
District abolished by 1882 Wisconsin Act 242; Brown County was consolidated into the Brown 1st and Brown 2nd Assembly districts
District re-established by 1951 Wisconsin Act 728 (implemented 1954)
Edward A. Seymour	Rep.	De Pere	January 3, 1955	January 5, 1959	72nd 73rd
Cletus J. Vanderperren	Dem.	Green Bay	January 5, 1959	January 1, 1973	74th 75th 76th 77th 78th 79th 80th
District abolished by 1971 Wisconsin Act 304; Brown County was divided between the 1st, 3rd, 4th, 5th, 89th, and 90th Assembly districts The Brown County 3rd district was roughly replaced by the 89th Assembly district

== Electoral history ==
=== 1954 boundaries ===
Year	Date	Elected				Defeated				Total	Plurality	Other primary candidates
1954	Nov. 2	Edward A. Seymour	Republican	5,366	50.22%	William J. Sweeney	Dem.	5,320	49.78%	10,686	46	Harvey Larsen (Rep.); Charles Wanish (Dem.)
1956	Nov. 6	Edward A. Seymour (inc)	Republican	7,753	56.61%	Cletus Vanderperren	Dem.	5,942	43.39%	13,695	1,811	Harvey Larsen (Rep.); Charles Wanish (Dem.)
1958	Nov. 4	Cletus Vanderperren	Democratic	5,724	52.20%	Edward A. Seymour (inc.)	Rep.	5,241	47.80%	10,965	483	John Brogan (Dem.); Harvey Larsen (Rep.); Francis X. Leanna (Dem.); Frank Van Laanen (Rep.)
1960	Nov. 8	Cletus Vanderperren (inc)	Democratic	8,256	54.24%	Lawrence J. Kafka	Rep.	6,964	45.76%	15,220	1,292	John Brogan (Dem.)
1962	Nov. 6	Cletus Vanderperren (inc)	Democratic	5,811	51.05%	Lawrence J. Kafka	Rep.	5,572	48.95%	11,383	239	

=== 1964 boundaries ===
Year	Date	Elected				Defeated				Total	Plurality	Other primary candidates
1964	Nov. 3	Cletus Vanderperren (inc)	Democratic	8,844	53.98%	Kenneth Katers	Rep.	7,541	46.02%	16,385	1,303	Adam B. Pinkerton (Rep.)
1966	Nov. 8	Cletus Vanderperren (inc)	Democratic	6,330	52.76%	Robert N. Johnson	Rep.	5,668	47.24%	11,998	662	Ervin Ambrosius (Dem.); Matt Holzem (Rep.)
1968	Nov. 5	Cletus Vanderperren (inc)	Democratic	9,745	51.15%	Robert N. Johnson	Rep.	9,308	48.85%	19,053	437	Jerome Sobiek (Rep.)
1970	Nov. 3	Cletus Vanderperren (inc)	Democratic	9,555	58.06%	Francis E. Petras	Rep.	6,677	40.57%	16,458	2,878	
1970	Nov. 3	Cletus Vanderperren (inc)	Democratic	9,555	58.06%	Kenneth R. Dantoin Sr.	Amer.	226	1.37%	16,458	2,878	
