= Cletus J. Vanderperren =

American politician (1912–1994)

Member of the Wisconsin State Assembly
- In office January 7, 1985 – January 4, 1993
- Preceded by: Earl F. McEssy
- Succeeded by: John Gard
- Constituency: 89th district
- In office January 3, 1983 – January 7, 1985
- Preceded by: Mary Panzer
- Succeeded by: Mary Panzer
- Constituency: 53rd district
- In office January 1, 1973 – January 3, 1983
- Preceded by: District established
- Succeeded by: Earl F. McEssy
- Constituency: 89th district
- In office January 5, 1959 – January 1, 1973
- Preceded by: Edward A. Seymour
- Succeeded by: District abolished
- Constituency: Brown 3rd district

Personal details
- Born: March 4, 1912 Pittsfield, Wisconsin, U.S.
- Died: September 24, 1994 (aged 82) Green Bay, Wisconsin, U.S.
- Resting place: Saint John the Baptist Church Cemetery, Howard, Wisconsin
- Party: Democratic
- Spouses: Viola Marie Luedtke (m. 1934; died 1975); Cora Stencil (m. 1978–1994)
- Children: Betty, Carlene, Gloria, Carol
- Profession: farmer, politician
- Nickname: Concrete Clete

Cletus J. Vanderperren (March 4, 1912 – September 24, 1994) was an American farmer and politician. A Democrat, he served 34 years in the Wisconsin State Assembly, representing Green Bay and northern Brown County. At the time of his retirement, he was the longest-serving member in the history of the Wisconsin Assembly. His legislative service earned him the nickname Concrete Clete for his efforts to fund roads, highways, and bridges throughout the state.

== Early life and career ==
Vanderperren was born on March 4, 1912, in Pittsfield, Wisconsin. He was educated at the Mills Center school and attended University of Wisconsin–Madison, though he did not graduate. He worked as a farmer for most of his life.

== Political career ==
Vanderperren became involved in local politics over the issue of farm-to-market roads and was elected to the Pittsfield Town Board in 1947. He would ultimately serve on the Town Board for the next 30 years, and would be chairman for many of those years. Shortly after his election to the Town Board, in 1951, he was elected to the Brown County Board of Supervisors, and would continue to serve on this board until 1966.

In 1956 he made his first attempt to run for Wisconsin State Assembly in Brown County's 3rd Assembly district, which at that time covered almost all of Brown County outside of Green Bay, Preble, and Allouez. He won a close contest in the Democratic primary but fell short of Republican Edward A. Seymour in the general election.

Vanderperren returned for a rematch in 1958, and this time narrowly defeated Seymour, taking 52% of the vote in the midterm election year. Despite difficult elections in his original district, where he rarely received more than 52% of the vote, Vanderperren would go on to win reelection sixteen times through three redistrictings.

== Legislative legacy ==
During his time in the Assembly, Vanderperren was known for his advocacy for road, highway, and bridge construction and maintenance and served as Chairman of the Assembly Highways Committee for 20 years (1973–1993). After his death, a friend, former state senator Jerome Van Sistine, said that Vanderperren was motivated by the deaths of friends in car accidents, particularly on Wisconsin Highway 29, which they referred to as "The Bloody '29". Vanderperren was the driving force behind the construction of four different bridges over the Fox River—the Allouez-Ashwaubenon, the Donald E. Tilleman, the Tower Drive bridge, and the Walnut Street bridge. He was also instrumental to funding for construction of U.S. Route 41, Interstate 43, and Wisconsin Highway 172.

One of his other longtime priorities in the legislature was the development of opportunities for higher education in the Green Bay area. He was a longtime advocate for the creation of a University of Wisconsin System branch at Green Bay, which he achieved in a 1965 law in collaboration with Kenosha representative George Molinaro and with the support of Republican Governor Warren P. Knowles. The law ultimately established the University of Wisconsin–Green Bay and the University of Wisconsin–Parkside. He also assisted in the creation of Northeast Wisconsin Technical College.

He was also instrumental in the creation of Heritage Hill State Historical Park in Brown County, which contains a number of structures listed in the National Register of Historic Places.

== Personal life and family ==
Vanderperren was married twice. His first wife, Viola, suffered from Von Willebrand disease and required frequent blood transfusions. Her condition led Vanderperren to push for state subsidies for blood transfusions. They married on November 24, 1934, and had four daughters together before her death in 1975. Vanderperren subsequently married Cora Stencil, who survived him.

Vanderperren died at Grancare Nursing Center in Green Bay, Wisconsin, on September 24, 1994. At his bedside when he died were his family and his friend, former state senator Jerome Van Sistine. He had seven grandchildren and three great grandchildren at the time of his death. He was preceded in death by his daughter, Betty, who died of Leukemia in 1992.

Due to his advocacy for the creation of the a University of Wisconsin branch at Green Bay, and for his support over the years, the University of Wisconsin–Green Bay named a dormitory building in his honor, known as Cletus Vanderperren Hall.

== Electoral history ==
=== Wisconsin Assembly, Brown 3rd district (1956–1970) ===
Year	Election	Date	Elected				Defeated				Total	Plurality
1956	Primary	Sep. 11	Cletus Vanderperren	Democratic	1,380	53.63%	Charles Wanish	Dem.	1,193	46.37%	2,573	187
1956	General	Nov. 6	Edward A. Seymour	Republican	7,753	56.61%	Cletus Vanderperren	Dem.	5,942	43.39%	13,695	1,811
1958	Primary	Sep. 9	Cletus Vanderperren	Democratic	953	46.65%	John Brogan	Dem.	820	40.14%	2,043	133
1958	Primary	Sep. 9	Cletus Vanderperren	Democratic	953	46.65%	Francis X. Leanna	Dem.	270	13.22%	2,043	133
1958	General	Nov. 4	Cletus Vanderperren	Democratic	5,724	52.20%	Edward A. Seymour (inc.)	Rep.	5,241	47.80%	10,965	483
1960	Primary	Sep. 13	Cletus Vanderperren (inc.)	Democratic	1,619	51.69%	John Brogan	Dem.	1,513	48.31%	3,132	106
1960	General	Nov. 8	Cletus Vanderperren (inc.)	Democratic	8,256	54.24%	Lawrence J. Kafka	Rep.	6,964	45.76%	15,220	1,292
1962	General	Nov. 6	Cletus Vanderperren (inc.)	Democratic	5,811	51.05%	Lawrence J. Kafka	Rep.	5,572	48.95%	11,383	239
1964	General	Nov. 3	Cletus Vanderperren (inc.)	Democratic	8,844	53.98%	Kenneth Katers	Rep.	7,541	46.02%	16,385	1,303
1966	Primary	Sep. 13	Cletus Vanderperren (inc.)	Democratic	1,628	64.71%	Ervin Ambrosius	Dem.	888	35.29%	2,516	740
1966	General	Nov. 8	Cletus Vanderperren (inc.)	Democratic	6,330	52.76%	Robert N. Johnson	Rep.	5,668	47.24%	11,998	662
1968	General	Nov. 5	Cletus Vanderperren (inc.)	Democratic	9,745	51.15%	Robert N. Johnson	Rep.	9,308	48.85%	19,053	437
1970	General	Nov. 3	Cletus Vanderperren (inc.)	Democratic	9,555	58.06%	Francis E. Petras	Rep.	6,677	40.57%	16,458	2,878
1970	General	Nov. 3	Cletus Vanderperren (inc.)	Democratic	9,555	58.06%	Kenneth R. Dantoin Sr.	Amer.	226	1.37%	16,458	2,878

=== Wisconsin Assembly, 89th district (1972–1980) ===
Year	Election	Date	Elected				Defeated				Total	Plurality
1972	General	Nov. 7	Cletus Vanderperren	Democratic	11,442	70.23%	Henry A. Rueden	Rep.	4,851	29.77%	16,293	6,591
1974	General	Nov. 5	Cletus Vanderperren (inc.)	Democratic	8,910	100.0%	--unopposed--				8,910	8,910
1976	General	Nov. 2	Cletus Vanderperren (inc.)	Democratic	12,356	68.71%	John R. Hansen	Rep.	5,628	31.29%	17,984	6,728
1978	General	Nov. 7	Cletus Vanderperren (inc.)	Democratic	8,826	64.57%	William H. Dierks	Rep.	4,842	35.43%	13,668	3,984
1980	Primary	Sep. 9	Cletus Vanderperren (inc.)	Democratic	1,587	83.05%	Wendell W. McLester	Dem.	324	16.95%	1,911	1,263
1980	General	Nov. 4	Cletus Vanderperren (inc.)	Democratic	12,685	59.04%	Robert A. Thompson	Rep.	8,799	40.96%	21,484	3,886

=== Wisconsin Assembly, 53rd district (1982) ===
Year	Election	Date	Elected				Defeated				Total	Plurality
1982	General	Nov. 2	Cletus Vanderperren	Democratic	9,463	65.82%	Peter E. Salefsky	Rep.	4,913	34.18%	14,376	4,550

=== Wisconsin Assembly, 89th district (1984–1990) ===
Year	Election	Date	Elected				Defeated				Total	Plurality
1984	General	Nov. 6	Cletus Vanderperren	Democratic	13,318	65.29%	James D. Shatswell	Rep.	7,079	34.71%	20,397	6,239
1986	General	Nov. 4	Cletus Vanderperren (inc.)	Democratic	10,721	68.73%	James D. Shatswell	Rep.	4,878	31.27%	15,599	5,843
1988	General	Nov. 8	Cletus Vanderperren (inc.)	Democratic	15,089	68.04%	James D. Shatswell	Rep.	7,089	31.96%	22,178	8,000
1990	General	Nov. 6	Cletus Vanderperren (inc.)	Democratic	9,604	58.71%	Gary F. Drzewiecki	Rep.	6,755	41.29%	16,359	2,849

Wisconsin State Assembly
Preceded by Edward A. Seymour	Member of the Wisconsin State Assembly from the Brown 3rd district January 5, 1959 – January 1, 1973	District abolished
New district	Member of the Wisconsin State Assembly from the 89th district January 1, 1973 – January 3, 1983	Succeeded by Earl F. McEssy
Preceded by Mary Panzer	Member of the Wisconsin State Assembly from the 53rd district January 3, 1983 – January 7, 1985	Succeeded by Mary Panzer
Preceded by Earl F. McEssy	Member of the Wisconsin State Assembly from the 89th district January 7, 1985 – January 4, 1993	Succeeded by John Gard
