= Wisconsin's Brown–Door–Kewaunee 2nd Assembly district =

Former American legislative district

Wisconsin's Brown–Door–Kewaunee 2nd State Assembly district
- Obsolete
- Notes: 1872–1876

Wisconsin's Brown–Door–Kewaunee 2nd Assembly district was a district in the Wisconsin State Assembly in the early years of the history of the state of Wisconsin, prior to the legislative redistricting reforms of 1972 which created the current numbered districts. Located in northeast Wisconsin, the district was part of a brief organization of four Assembly districts shared among Brown, Door, and Kewaunee counties; this district comprised just the western third of Brown County.

The district was in use for elections from 1871 through 1875 (inclusive).

== List of representatives ==
List of representatives from the Brown–Door–Kewaunee 2nd district
| Member | Party | Residence | Term start | Term end | Leg. |
|---|---|---|---|---|---|
District created by 1871 Wisconsin Act 156
| David Cooper Ayres | Rep. | Fort Howard | January 1, 1872 | January 6, 1873 | 25th |
| William H. Bartran | Rep. | Suamico | January 6, 1873 | January 4, 1875 | 26th 27th |
| William J. Fisk | Rep. | Fort Howard | January 4, 1875 | January 1, 1877 | 28th 29th |
District abolished by 1876 Wisconsin Act 343; Brown County was reorganized into the Brown 1st, Brown 2nd, and Brown 3rd Assembly districts Kewaunee County was consolidated as a single-county Assembly district Door County became a single-county Assembly district The Brown–Door–Kewaunee 2nd district was roughly replaced by the Brown 2nd Assembly district
