= Earl F. McEssy =

American politician

Earl Francis McEssy (February 12, 1913 – October 14, 1989) was a member of the Wisconsin State Assembly.

== Biography ==
McEssy was born in Fond du Lac, Wisconsin. He graduated from Marquette University. Additionally, he received an honorary doctorate from Marian College. During World War II, he served with the United States Navy.

== Political career ==
McEssy was a member of the Assembly from 1957 to 1988. He was a Republican.

Wisconsin State Assembly
Preceded by Nicholas J. Lesselyoung	Member of the Wisconsin State Assembly from the 1st Fond du Lac County district 1957–1973	District abolished
District created	Member of the Wisconsin State Assembly from the 52nd district 1973–1983	Succeeded by Richard P. Matty
Preceded by Cletus J. Vanderperren	Member of the Wisconsin State Assembly from the 89th district 1983–1985	Succeeded by Cletus J. Vanderperren
Preceded by Richard P. Matty	Member of the Wisconsin State Assembly from the 52nd district 1985–1989	Succeeded by Peg Lautenschlager
