= William J. Duffy =

20th century American politician and judge

The Honorable William J. Duffy

Chief Judge of the 8th District of Wisconsin Circuit Courts
- In office August 1, 1982 – July 31, 1988
- Preceded by: Clarence W. Nier
- Succeeded by: Harold Vernon Froehlich

Wisconsin Circuit Judge
- In office August 1, 1978 – July 31, 1992
- Preceded by: Transitioned from 14th Circ.
- Succeeded by: Susan Bischel
- Constituency: Brown Circuit, Branch 3
- In office June 1968 – July 31, 1978
- Preceded by: Position established
- Succeeded by: Circuit abolished
- Constituency: 14th Circuit, Branch 3

Member of the Wisconsin State Assembly from the Brown 2nd district
- In office January 1, 1949 – January 1, 1951
- Preceded by: Harvey Larsen
- Succeeded by: Harvey Larsen

Personal details
- Born: October 29, 1916 North Branch, Minnesota, US
- Died: February 25, 2013 (aged 96) Green Bay, Wisconsin, US
- Resting place: Allouez Catholic Cemetery, Green Bay, Wisconsin
- Party: Democratic
- Spouse: Elizabeth Boyden (m. 1950; died 1999)
- Children: 5
- Education: St. Norbert College (B.A.); University of Wisconsin Law School (J.D.)

Military service
- Allegiance: United States
- Branch/service: United States Army; Army Air Forces
- Years of service: 1941–1945
- Rank: Captain
- Battles/wars: World War II: Pacific War

William J. Duffy (October 29, 1916 – February 25, 2013) was an American lawyer, politician, and judge. He served 24 years as a Wisconsin circuit court judge in Brown County (1968–1992), and was chief judge of Wisconsin's 8th judicial district from 1982 to 1988. Earlier in his career, he served one term in the Wisconsin State Assembly (1949), representing Brown County as a Democrat.

== Biography ==
Born in North Branch, Minnesota, Duffy grew up in Hollandtown, Wisconsin, and graduated from Kaukauna High School. He graduated from St. Norbert College and received his Juris Doctor degree from the University of Wisconsin Law School in 1941. Later that year, he joined the United States Army Air Forces for service in World War II. He served throughout the war in the Pacific theater, rising to the rank of Captain.

After the war, he practiced law in Green Bay, Wisconsin, in a partnership with attorney Jerry Clifford. In 1948 he defeated incumbent Republican Assemblyman Harvey Larsen to serve in the Wisconsin State Assembly for the 1949-1950 session. Larsen came back and defeated Duffy in 1950, ending his brief career in the Assembly. Duffy returned to his legal practice.

In 1967, the Wisconsin Legislature created a third branch in the 14th judicial circuit. Duffy ran unopposed in the special election for the new circuit court judgeship, and would remain on the circuit court in Brown County for the next 24 years, earning re-election in 1974, 1980, and 1986. In 1982, he was selected as Chief Judge for the 8th Judicial Administrative District by the Wisconsin Supreme Court. He served the maximum 3 two-year terms as Chief Judge.

Judge Duffy retired from the court in 1992, but continued to work as a reserve judge and remained an active member of the community in the city of Green Bay. He served on the faculty of the University of Wisconsin–Green Bay from 1970 to 1975, teaching labor law, he was the first president of the Green Bay Voluntary Commission on Human Rights, and was a member of the Governor's Commission on Human Rights.

== Personal life and family ==
In May 1950, Duffy married Elizabeth Boyden. Judge Duffy died on February 25, 2013, in Green Bay, Wisconsin, at age 96. His wife preceded him in death. They were survived by five children and ten grandchildren.

== Electoral history ==
=== Wisconsin Assembly (1948, 1950) ===
Wisconsin Assembly, Brown 2nd District Election, 1948
| Party | Candidate | Votes | % | ±% |
|---|---|---|---|---|
General Election, November 2, 1948
| Democratic | William J. Duffy | 8,015 | 55.87% | +6.64% |
| Republican | Harvey Larsen (incumbent) | 6,331 | 44.13% | |
| Plurality | | 1,684 | 11.74% | +10.20% |
| Total votes | | 14,346 | 100.0% | +12.61% |
| Democratic gain from Republican | | | | |

Wisconsin Assembly, Brown 2nd District Election, 1950
| Party | Candidate | Votes | % | ±% |
|---|---|---|---|---|
General Election, November 7, 1950
| Republican | Harvey Larsen | 6,775 | 51.08% | |
| Democratic | William J. Duffy (incumbent) | 6,488 | 48.92% | −6.95% |
| Plurality | | 287 | 2.16% | -9.57% |
| Total votes | | 13,263 | 100.0% | -7.55% |
| Republican gain from Democratic | | | | |

=== Wisconsin Circuit Court (1968, 1974, 1980, 1986) ===
Wisconsin Circuit Court, 14th Circuit, Branch 3 Election, 1968
| Party | Candidate | Votes | % | ±% |
|---|---|---|---|---|
General Election, April 2, 1968
| Nonpartisan | William J. Duffy | 37,609 | 100.0% | |
| Total votes | | 37,609 | 100.0% | |

Legal offices
| New branch | Wisconsin Circuit Court Judge for the 14th Circuit, Branch 3; 1968 – 1978 | Circuit abolished |
| New circuit | Wisconsin Circuit Court Judge for the Brown Circuit, Branch 3; 1978 – 1992 | Succeeded by Susan Bischel |
| Preceded by Clarence W. Nier | Chief Judge of the 8th District of Wisconsin Circuit Courts; 1982 – 1988 | Succeeded by Harold Vernon Froehlich |
