= Eugene Michael Lynch =

Eugene Michael Lynch was a Brigadier General in the United States Army.

== Biography ==
Eugene Michael Lynch was born on August 2, 1923 in Green Bay, Wisconsin. His father Robert Lynch was a longtime member of the Wisconsin State Assembly who had been a professional baseball player and manager and head baseball coach of the Notre Dame Fighting Irish and Clemson Tigers. Lynch's mother Marie was the private secretary for Joseph Martin, himself a former State Assemblyman and a future Justice of the Wisconsin Supreme Court.

The younger Lynch was married to the former Florence Lorraine Leonhard, with whom he had seven children. Their daughter Mary Kathleen died as an infant in 1956.

Lynch died on September 5, 2003 in Fairfax County, Virginia. He was buried at Arlington National Cemetery. Florence died in 2017 and was buried with him.

== Career ==
Lynch originally joined the Army as an enlisted man during World War II. He was assigned to the 14th Armored Division and was deployed to the European theatre. By the end of the war, Lynch had been commissioned as an officer.

His assignments during the Korean War included being the personal pilot for Walton Walker and Matthew Ridgway. During the Vietnam War, Lynch was a brigade commander with the 25th Infantry Division.

While in that role, Lynch earned the Distinguished Service Cross, the Army's second-highest award. Other decorations Lynch received during his military career included the Distinguished Service Medal, the Silver Star with oak leaf cluster, the Distinguished Flying Cross with multiple oak leaf clusters, the Presidential Unit Citation with oak leaf cluster, the Purple Heart, the World War II Victory Medal, the Army of Occupation Medal and the Combat Infantryman Badge.
