= Hal Malchow =

American political consultant (1951–2024)

- Born: Harold Clark Malchow Jr. 4 November 1951; Gulfport, Mississippi, U.S.
- Died: 21 March 2024 (aged 72); Zürich, Switzerland
- Education: Millsaps College; University of the Pacific
- Occupation: Political consultant
- Spouse: Astrid Weigert (divorced) Anne Mahoney Marsh (m. 2015)
- Relatives: Harold C. Malchow (grandfather)
- Website: halmalchow.com

Signature
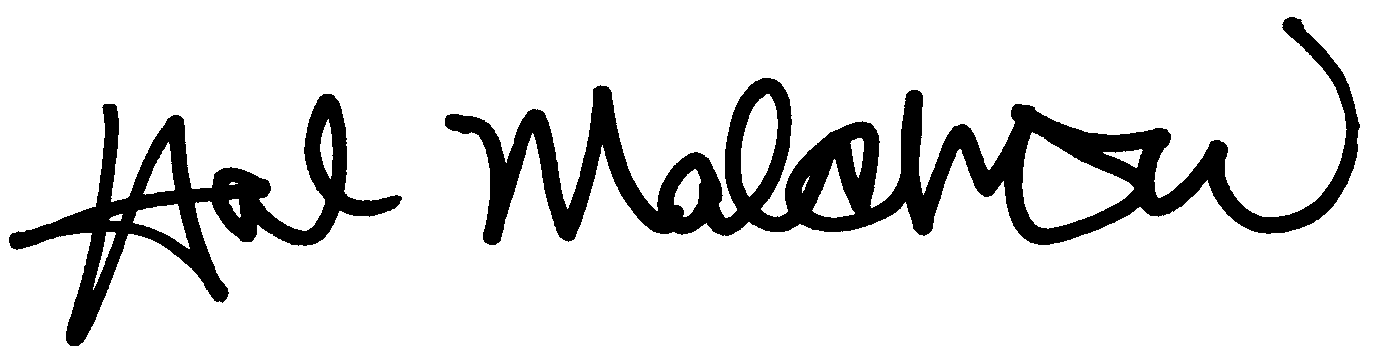

Harold Clark Malchow Jr. (4 November 1951 – 21 March 2024) was an American political consultant, securities lawyer, and author. During his consulting career, he worked for every Democratic presidential nominee from 1988 through 2004, over 30 senatorial campaigns, 20 gubernatorial campaigns, and multiple organizations. He specialized in "direct voter contact" mailing, a form of campaigning. Malchow is considered a pioneer of microtargeting voters with data for campaigns.

== Early life and education ==
Harold Clark Malchow Jr. was born on 4 November 1951, in Gulfport, Mississippi, to Mary Clark Hewes and Harold Clark Malchow. His mother, a Republican economist and professor, was deeply upset when Malchow's ninth-grade class was desegregated. His father was an environmental engineer, and Malchow's paternal grandfather was Harold C. Malchow.

Malchow graduated from Gulfport High School in 1969 and Millsaps College with a degree in political science in 1973. He received a Juris Doctor degree from University of the Pacific's McGeorge School of Law in 1981 and passed The Mississippi Bar the same year. At University of the Pacific, he was the vice president of its student bar association and associate editor of a law journal.

Early in 1987, Malchow was arrested with two other Americans in a Peru international airport, after being accused by a customs agent for possessing cocaine. They were alleged by a customs agent to have paper towels soaked in liquid cocaine in one of the other American's luggage; Malchow was alleged to have put cocaine in an arm cast he was wearing. Police said the three, detained while preparing to board on a plane to Holland, were not jailed or formally charged.

== Career ==
Malchow's political involvement began in college, and led a few unsuccessful campaigns before a successful one with Al Gore. He worked for multiple organizations, including the United Auto Workers, the Democratic National Committee, the AFL-CIO, Sierra Club, and EMILY's List. He helped found the Analyst Institute with Michael Podhorzer in 2007, and created a consulting firm, MSHC Partners.

=== Early career (1970–1990) ===
While attending Millsaps College, Malchow joined the Mississippi Freedom Democratic Party which challenged the Democratic Party to resist the establishment segregationists. He also organized anti-Vietnam rallies and was a left-leaning columnist for the school's paper. Malchow worked on Charles Evers' unsuccessful 1971 gubernatorial bid as well.

Malchow briefly worked as a securities lawyer, and worked at a law firm in Jackson, Mississippi, but left after realizing how boring writing contracts defending against financial fraud was compared to devising schemes to do them.

He volunteered to work with Mississippi First, a progressive nonprofit founded in 1982 backing Mississippi governor William F. Winter's reforms, which stalled in the stage legislature. Malchow was the head of Mississippi First's fundraising, where he requested donor lists from the previous living governors, and manually entered every name into an Apple II. The fundraising brought in $100,000, enabling the effort to enact Winter's education laws.

Following graduation, he worked running campaigns, but none were successful until running Al Gore's 1984 Senate campaign. Malchow was hired at the Tennessee Democratic Party as a temporary executive secretary in late 1983, before becoming Gore's campaign manager. Following the campaign, he moved to Washington, D.C. where he was often asked to assist in fundraising through the mail. Malchow devised solicitations that could be mailed to readers of particular magazines and donors to causes, saying that they "had to be a four-page letter, and it had to go in an envelope" to be effective.

=== Later career (1990–2010) ===
MSHC Partners, his consulting firm, handled political mail for 30 senators' and 20 governors' campaigns. It did so for both of Bill Clinton's campaigns and John Kerry's as well. During Clinton's reelection, ten percent of the money that the Democratic National Committee raised went to MSHC Partners.

In the mid-90s, he began making use of consumer databases with useful information on voters. Microtargeting of people with demographic groups, individual characteristics, and geographic areas, are now widely used in campaigns.

He shut down MSHC Partners after the 2010 United States elections, which surprised his colleagues and the firm's employees and clients. In an email he wrote to them, he said that "advertising has become not just more negative but more vicious and personal. ... I don't say all this to criticize anyone. ... I just no longer want to do this work."

=== Semi-retirement (2010–2024) ===
Though he shut down MSHC Partners, Malchow continued to work with the Analyst Institute and The Voter Participation Center. He moved from Arlington, Virginia, to Santa Fe, New Mexico. Starting in May 2014 and ending in December 2016, Malchow was the president of the International Dyslexia Association.

== Diagnosis and death ==
Malchow's mother began suffering from early onset dementia, so Malchow took a genetic test in 1987 which found him likely to develop Alzheimer's. At the time, he was around 35, and vowed to take his life if he developed symptoms. Malchow would regularly be tested for symptoms. A 2019 brainwave scan showed evidence of an emerging dementia, and he was diagnosed with Alzheimer's. He adopted a diet and regular exercise in hopes that it would stave off its effects. The next year, though, he started showing concrete symptoms, forgetting passwords and movies or TV he watched.

Despite New Mexico permitting assisted suicide, the state requires that it be for terminally ill patients with a prognosis of only a few months. Alzheimer's does not fit that requirement. In September 2023, Malchow contacted the nonprofit assisted death advocacy group Dignitas, and scheduled his death. The date was scheduled around when he would finish his final book.

Malchow gave an interview with Politico published five days before his death. He discussed his life's work, his Alzheimer's diagnosis, and his final book Reinventing Political Advertising. Malchow argued that, in an era where the vast majority of voters are split between two parties, targeting ticket-splitters and independents no longer made sense. Instead he encouraged the Democratic Party to aggressively promote itself and turnout among its voter base. He also joked that he was happy to know he would never have to see Donald Trump again.

Malchow died via assisted suicide in Zürich, Switzerland, on 21 March 2024, at the age of 72.

== Bibliography ==
- The New Political Targeting. Campaigns and Elections Magazine. 2003. ISBN 9780963744746. OCLC 56813414.
- Malchow, Alex (2011). The Sword of Darrow. BenBella Books. ISBN 9781935618461. OCLC 659768803.
- The Dragon and the Firefly. 2014.
- No Popes in Heaven. 2018.
- 42 Million to One: A Political Thriller Inspired by Real Events. Double M Publishers. 2020. ISBN 9780578737973. OCLC 1203967073.
- Reinventing Political Advertising. 2024. ISBN 9798218267384. OCLC 1402819313.
