= Hollandtown, Wisconsin =

- Unincorporated community
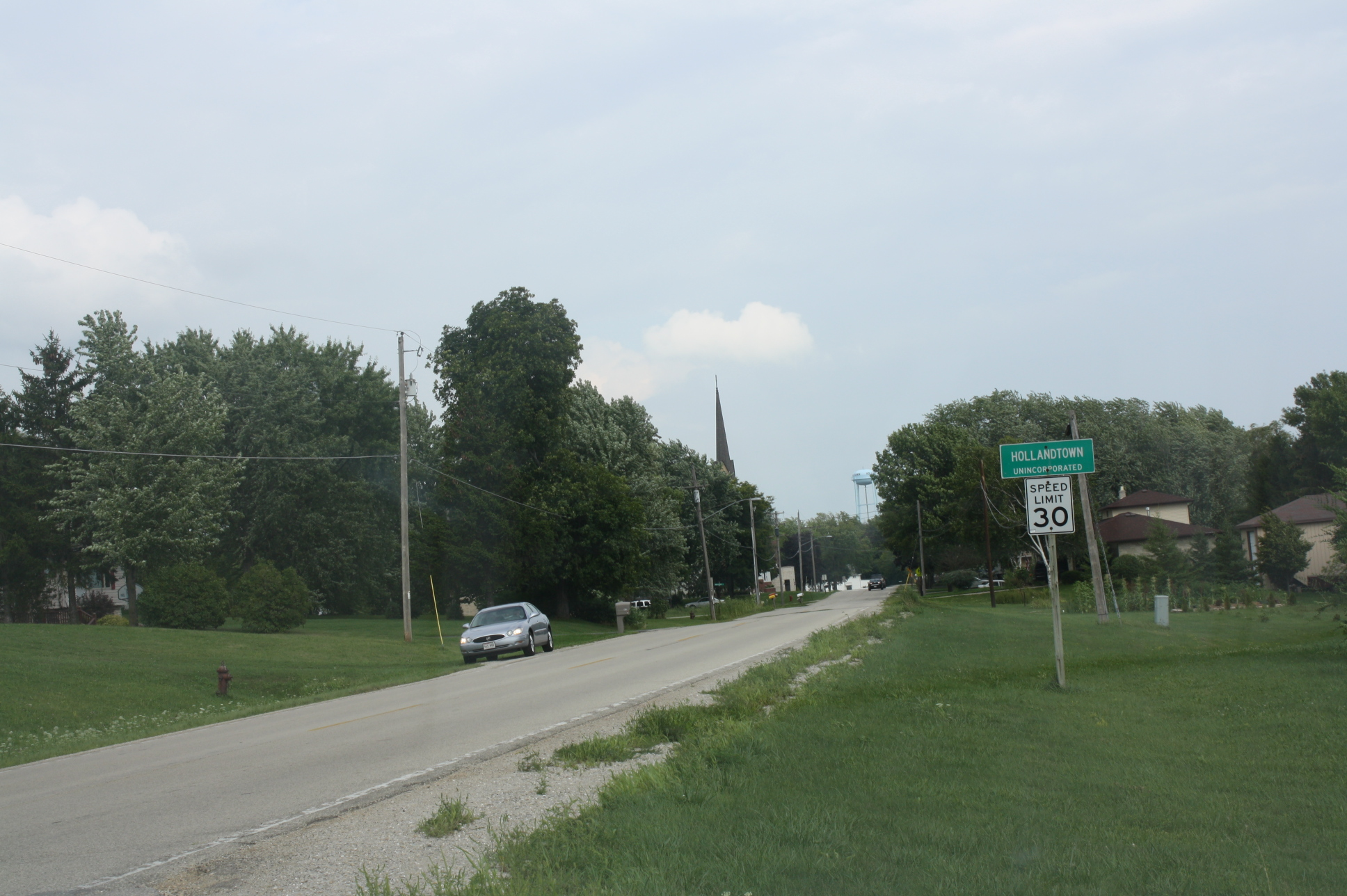
- Welcome sign

- Location within the state of Wisconsin
- Coordinates: 44°14′55″N 88°10′18″W
- Country: United States
- State: Wisconsin
- County: Brown
- Town: Holland
- Established: circa 1848
- Elevation: 768 ft (234 m)
- Time zone: UTC-6 (Central (CST))
  - Summer (DST): UTC-5 (CDT)
- Area code: 920
- GNIS feature ID: 1566546

Hollandtown is an unincorporated community in the town of Holland in Brown County, Wisconsin, United States. It is located along County D. Some maps call it Holland.

== History ==
Hollandtown was established around 1848 by a group led by Father Adrianus Dominicus Godthardt from Holland. The group also settled in nearby Darboy.

Father Godthart and passengers from the ship Libra that arrived in Little Chute, Wisconsin in 1848 sought a better place to settle. His journal reads "But when the immigrants saw the place Father Van den Broek had desitined for them, they were disappointed. Those of us who had arrived first had to wait for the other two groups sixteen and seventeen days. No one wanted to stay at that place which had bad connections, had no commerce or stores, and where the land was not fertile." [Father Van den Broek had organized three ships of Catholics from North Braband, the Netherlands. The passengers of the Libra were the first to arrive in the area, followed by immigrants aboard The America and The Maria Magdalena.]

== Notable people ==
- William J. Duffy, Wisconsin jurist and legislator
