= Gustav J. Zittlow =

American politician

Gustav Julius Zittlow (January 9, 1870 – July 1952) was an American politician.

Born in the town of Lawrence, Brown County, Wisconsin, Zittlow was a farmer specializing in cattle breeding. He was treasurer of South Lawrence Butter and Cheese Company and secretary-treasurer of American Society of Equity in Wrightstown, Wisconsin. Zittlow served as clerk of the school board. He then served in the Wisconsin State Assembly from 1921 to 1927 and 1931 as a Republican. He was also a member of the Progressive Party. He died in July 1952.
