= James Rasmussen =

American politician

Jens Jessen Rasmussen, also known as James Rasmussen (born 29 September 1835 on Langeland) was a Danish-born American politician. He was a member of the Wisconsin State Assembly.

== Biography ==
Rasmussen was born on the island of Langeland, Denmark on September 29, 1835. He moved to what is now Milwaukee, Wisconsin in 1847 before settling in Brown County, Wisconsin in 1849.

== Career ==
Rasmussen was a member of the Assembly in 1881 and 1883. Also in 1881, Rasmussen was a candidate for the Wisconsin State Senate. In addition, Rasmussen was Chairman (often similar to Mayor) of New Denmark, Wisconsin and of Ashwaubenon, Wisconsin, as well as Chairman of the County Board. He was a Republican.
