= Harold C. Malchow =

American lawyer and politician

Harold C. Malchow (January 24, 1903 – March 17, 1938) was an American lawyer and politician.

Born in Green Bay in northeastern Wisconsin, Malchow went to Lawrence University and then received his law degree from the University of Tennessee College of Law at Knoxville, Tennessee. Malchow practiced law in Mississippi and edited the only Republican newspaper in the state. In 1927, Malchow returned to Green Bay to practice law. From 1929 to 1933, Malchow served as a Republican in the Wisconsin State Assembly. In 1934, Malchow ran unsuccessfully for a seat in the United States House of Representatives. In 1934 he was a member of the Lone Indian Fraternity, International, founded by Ernest T. Grube of Sheboygan, WI.

Malchow died in a hospital in Green Bay, Wisconsin following a brief illness.

== See also ==
- Hal Malchow (grandson)
