= Henry J. Janssen =

American politician

Henry J. Janssen was a member of the Wisconsin State Assembly.

== Biography ==
Janssen was born on November 6, 1876, in West De Pere, Wisconsin. On January 7, 1902, he married Ida Rupiper. They would have a daughter. Janssen was a member of the Knights of Columbus and the Catholic Order of Foresters. He died on April 4, 1922.

== Career ==
Janssen was a member of the Assembly during the 1911, 1913, 1915 and 1917 sessions. He was a city councilman from 1901 to 1904 and again from 1907 to 1909. From October 1, 1911, to December 1, 1912, he was Deputy Register of Deeds of Brown County, Wisconsin. Other positions Janssen held include justice of the peace and city assessor, as well as member of the Brown County Board of Supervisors. He was a Democrat.
