= Edward A. Seymour =

American politician

Edward Amos Seymour (August 1, 1887 – July 4, 1965) was a member of the Wisconsin State Assembly.

== Biography ==
Seymour was born Edward Amos Seymour on August 1, 1887 in De Pere, Wisconsin. In 1919, he married Laura Caroline Knuth. He died on July 4, 1965.

== Career ==
Seymour served as Mayor of De Pere from 1950 to 1954 before serving in the Assembly from 1955 to 1958. He was a Republican.
