= Adolph A. Deering =

American politician

Adolph August "A.A." Deering (June 1, 1888 – October 23, 1972) was a member of the Wisconsin State Assembly.

== Biography ==
Deering was born in Hartland, Shawano County, Wisconsin on June 1, 1888. He was an undersheriff and a bus driver. Deering was a member of the City of Green Bay Industrial Development Authority. He died on October 23, 1972.

== Career ==
Deering was elected to the Assembly in 1958 from Green Bay, Wisconsin. He was a Republican.
