= Little Rapids, Wisconsin =

- Unincorporated community
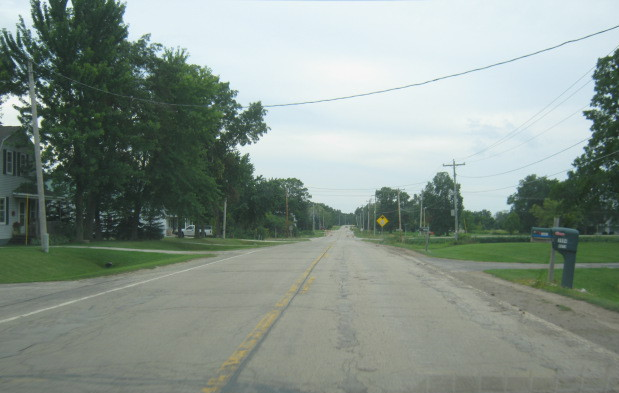
- Looking at Little Rapids on County D

- Location within Wisconsin Location within the United States
- Coordinates: 44°22′49″N 88°07′38″W
- Country: United States
- State: Wisconsin
- County: Brown
- Town: Lawrence
- Elevation: 630 ft (190 m)
- Time zone: UTC-6 (Central (CST))
  - Summer (DST): UTC-5 (CDT)
- Area code: 920
- GNIS feature ID: 1568375

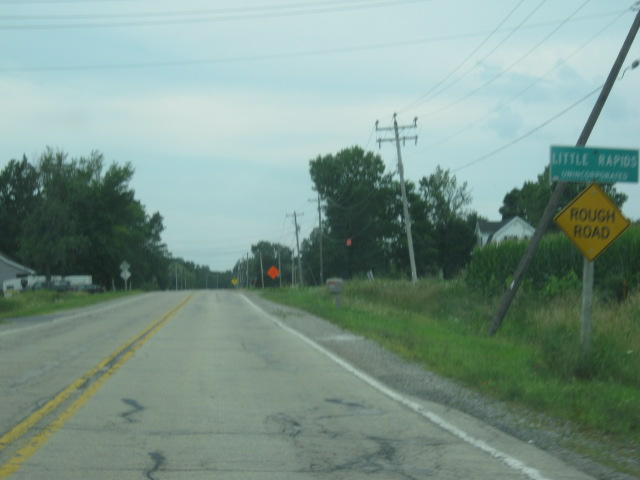
The sign for Little Rapids on County D.

Little Rapids is an unincorporated community located in the town of Lawrence, Brown County, Wisconsin, United States. Little Rapids is located on the Fox River, 11 miles (18 km) southwest of Green Bay.

== History ==
A post office called Little Rapids was established in 1873, and remained in operation until it was discontinued in 1939. The community took its name from rapids on a stream near the town site.
