= Dennis Dewane =

American politician

Dennis Dewane was an Irish-born American politician. He was a member of the Wisconsin State Assembly from the 3rd District of Brown County, Wisconsin, during the 1873 and 1876 sessions. He was a Democrat. Dewane was born on November 14, 1834, in County Tipperary, Ireland.

Dewane also served as the first chairman of the town of New Denmark, Wisconsin, after its formation in 1855.
