= Askeaton, Wisconsin =

- Unincorporated community
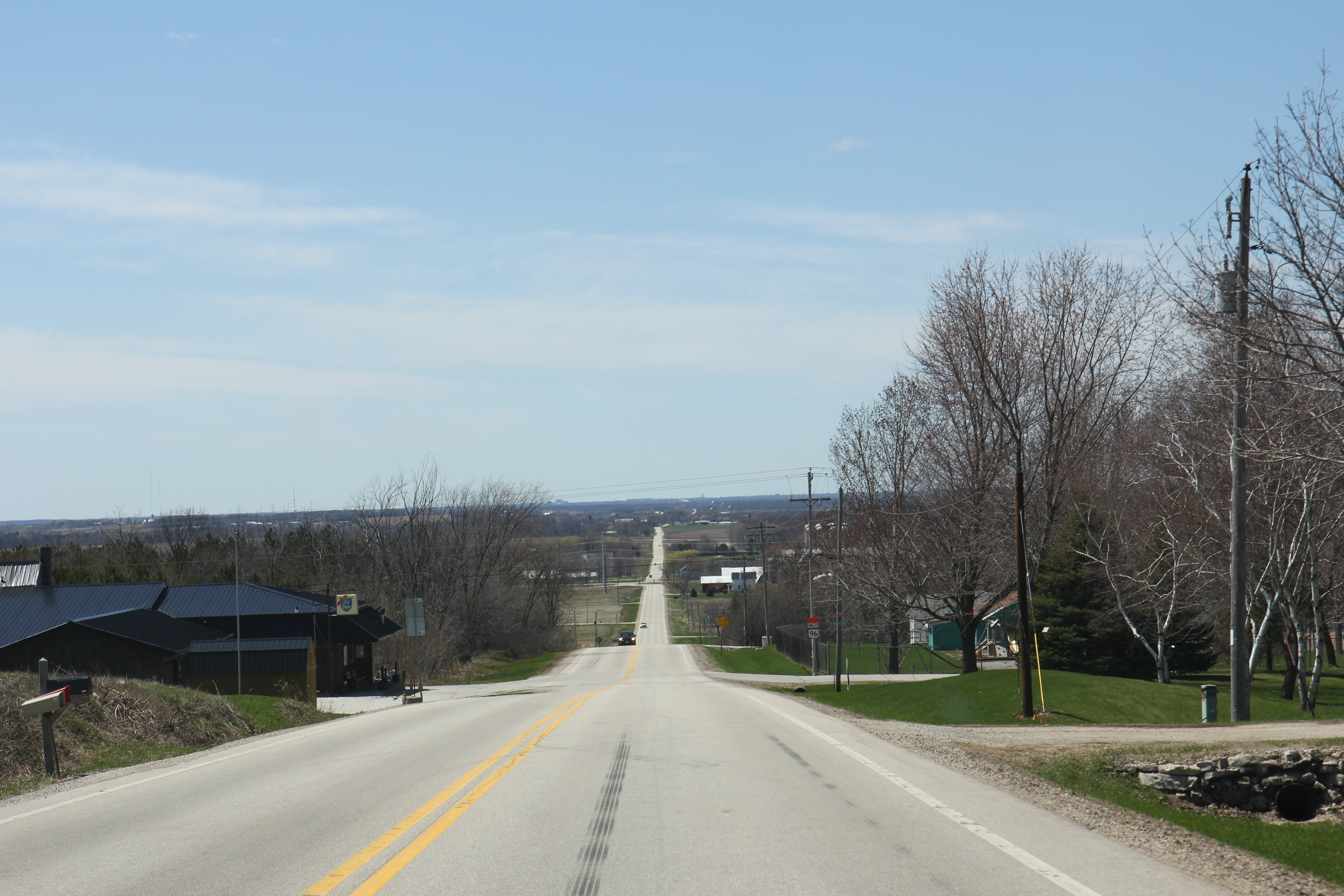
- Looking west down the Niagara Escarpment from Askeaton

- Location within Wisconsin Location within the United States
- Coordinates: 44°16′15.7362″N 88°05′44.0412″W
- Country: United States
- State: Wisconsin
- County: Brown
- Town: Holland
- Elevation: 741 ft (226 m)
- Time zone: UTC-6 (Central (CST))
  - Summer (DST): UTC-5 (CDT)
- Area code: 920
- GNIS feature ID: 1577498

Askeaton (/æsˈkitən/ ass-KEE-tən) is an unincorporated community located in the town of Holland, Brown County, Wisconsin, United States. Askeaton is located southeast of Wrightstown at the intersection of County Z and St. Pat's Church Road. The town hall for the Town of Holland is located in Askeaton.

"Askeaton" is also the name of a small village in southwestern Ireland near Limerick. By the late 1800s, a large number of Irish immigrants had immigrated to this area of Brown County, and founded one of Askeaton's most prominent landmarks, St. Patrick's Church. St. Patrick's church is served by priests of St. Clare's parish.

== Images ==
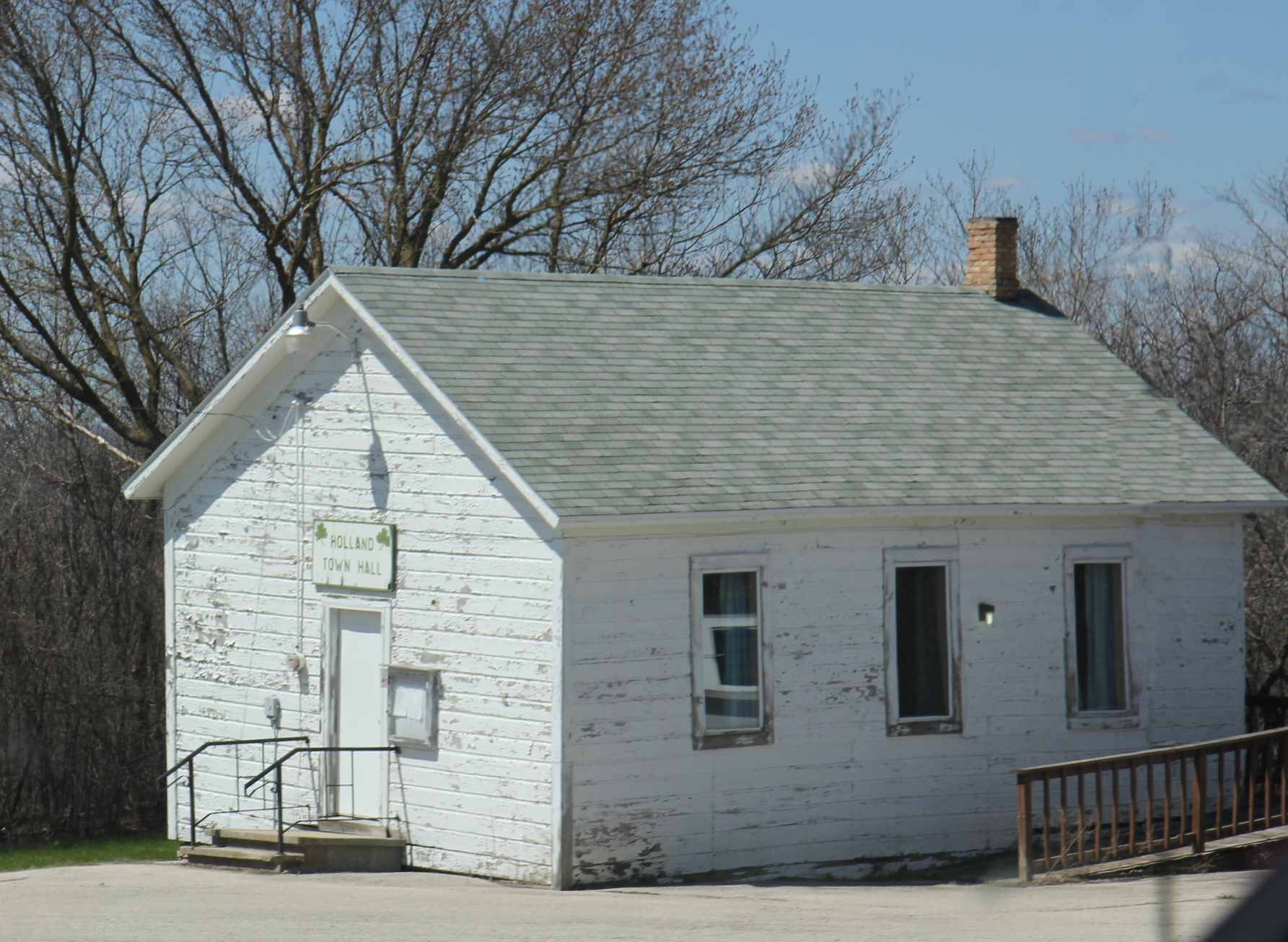
Town Hall for Town of Holland

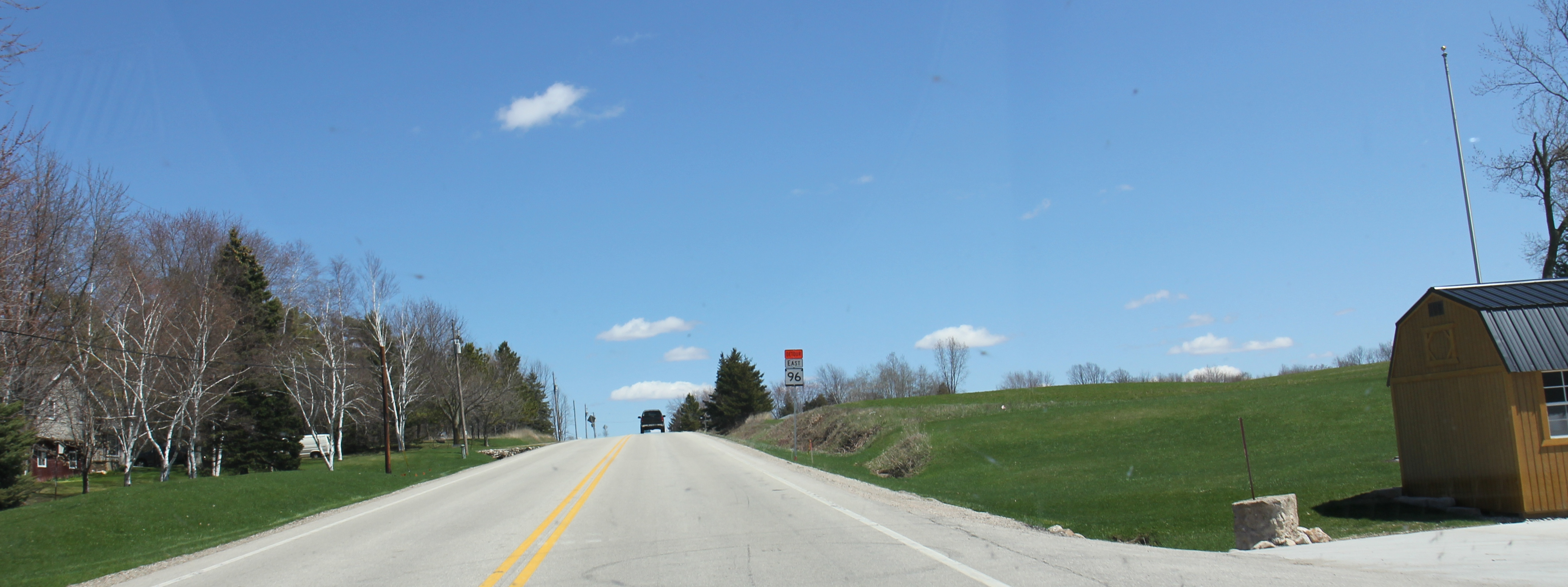
Looking east from Askeaton
