= Holland, Brown County, Wisconsin =

Holland, Wisconsin
- Town
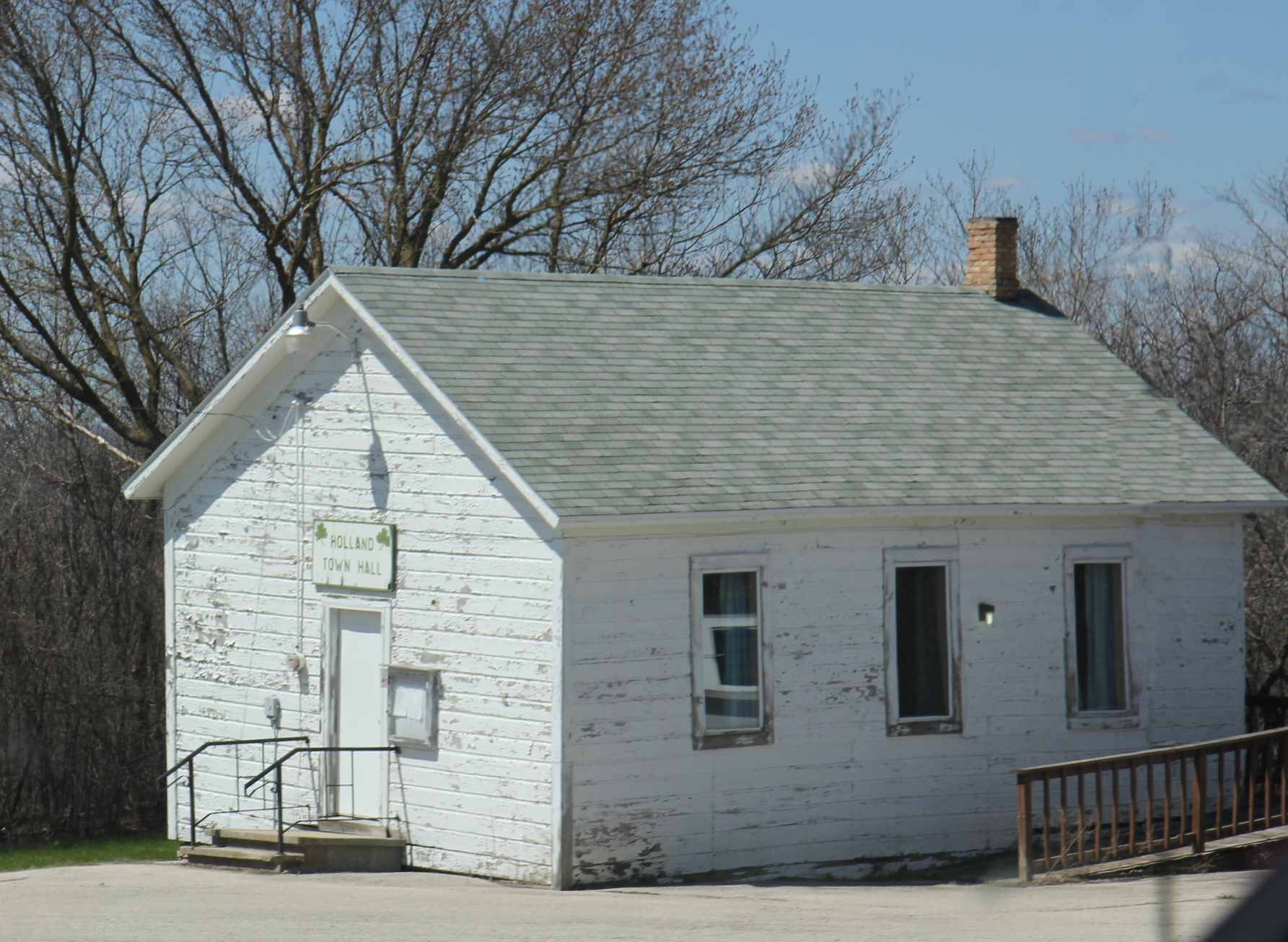
- Town hall for Holland

- Location in Brown County and the state of Wisconsin.
- Coordinates: 44°16′21″N 88°7′35″W
- Country: United States
- State: Wisconsin
- County: Brown

Area
  - Total: 36.0 sq mi (93.2 km^{2})
  - Land: 36.0 sq mi (93.2 km^{2})
  - Water: 0 sq mi (0.0 km^{2})
- Elevation: 768 ft (234 m)

Population (2020)
  - Total: 1,559
  - Density: 43.3/sq mi (16.7/km^{2})
- Time zone: UTC-6 (Central (CST))
  - Summer (DST): UTC-5 (CDT)
- Area code: 920
- FIPS code: 55-35325
- GNIS feature ID: 1583400
- Website: hollandbrowncountywi.gov

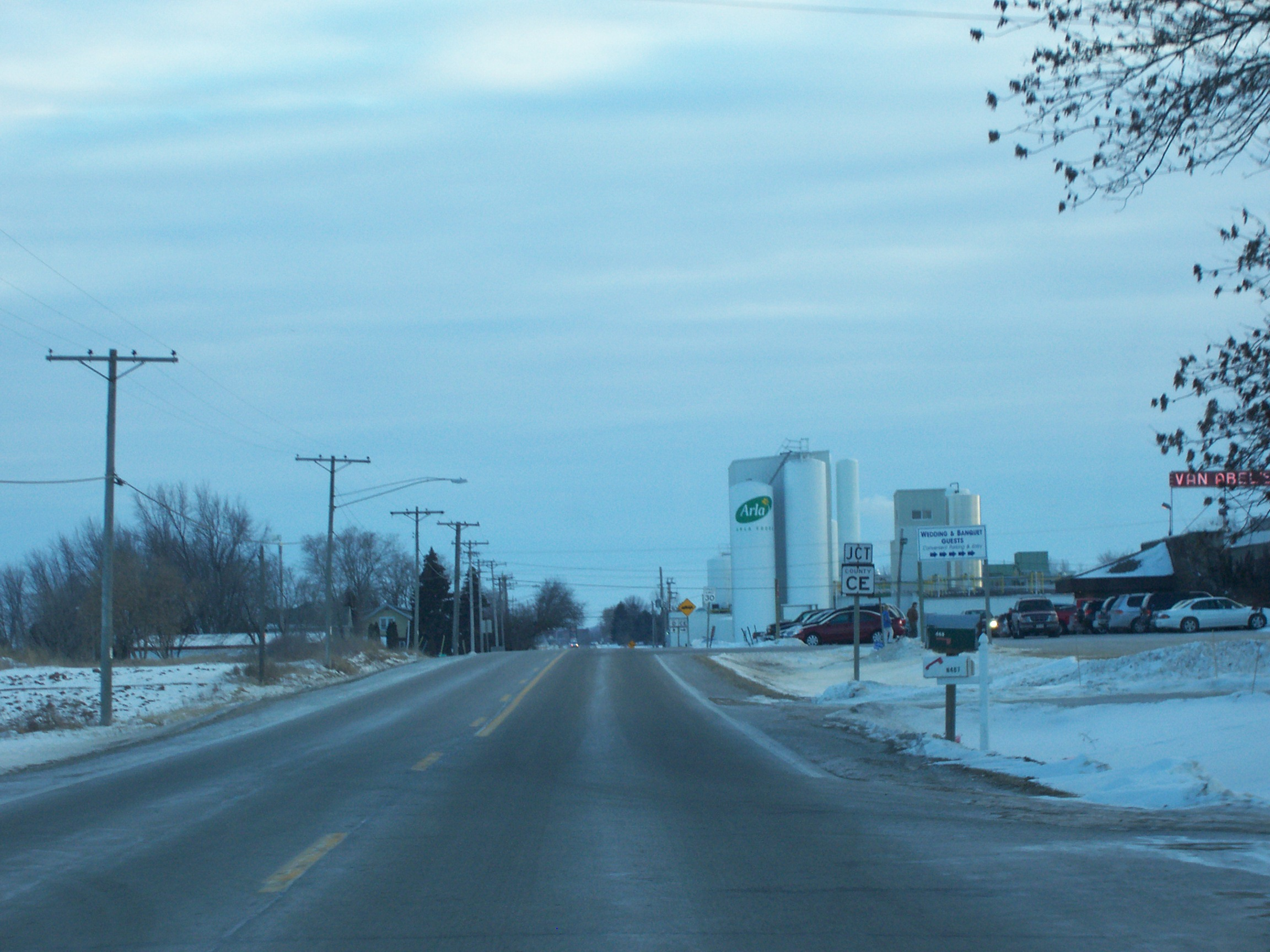
Looking south at the unincorporated village of Hollandtown

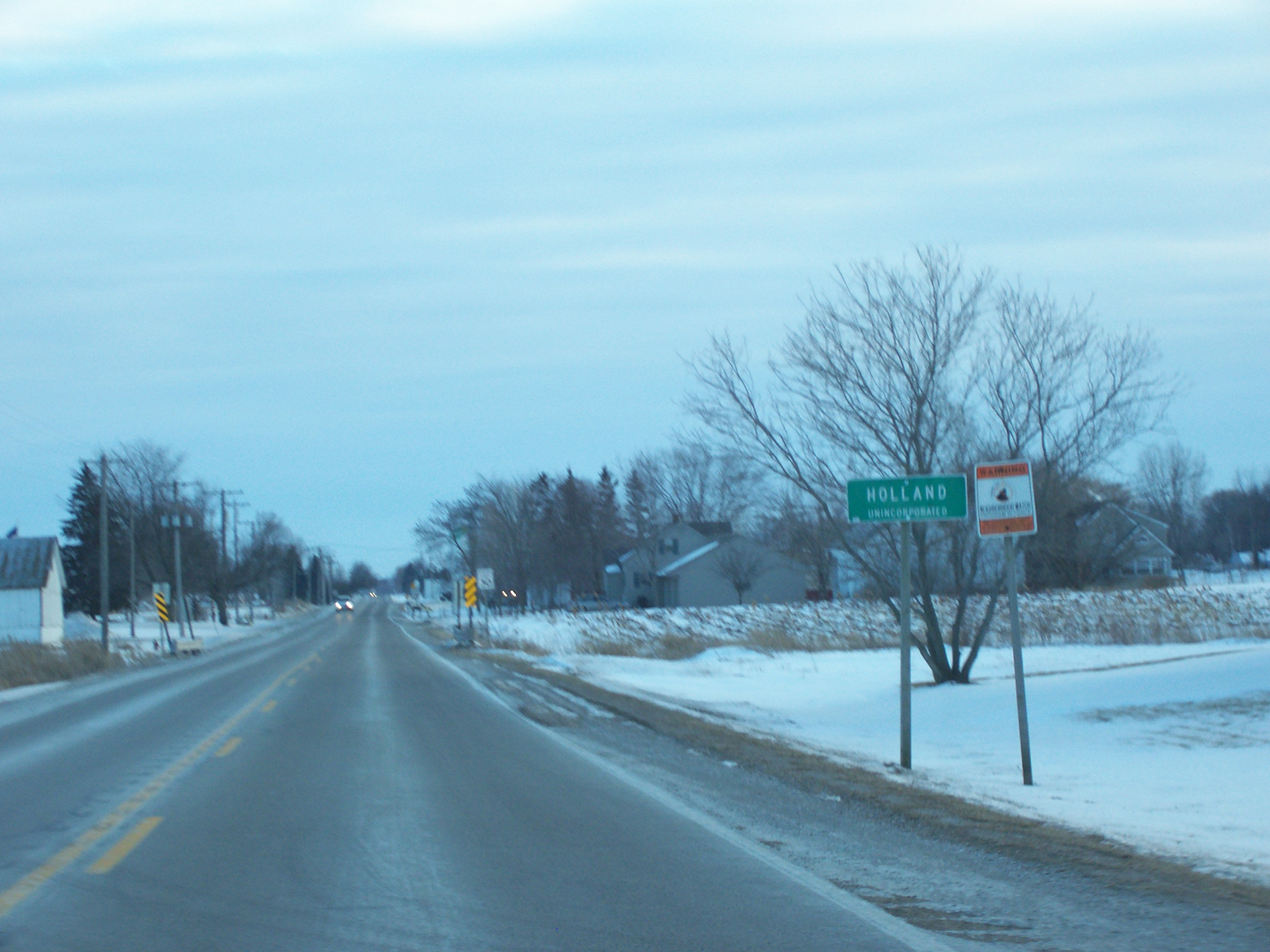
The sign for Hollandtown

Holland is a town in Brown County in the U.S. state of Wisconsin. The population was 1,559 at the 2020 census. The unincorporated communities of Askeaton and Hollandtown are located in the town.

== Geography ==
Holland occupies the southwestern corner of Brown County, with Outagamie County to the west and Calumet and Manitowoc counties to the south.

According to the United States Census Bureau, the town has a total area of 36.0 square miles (93.2 km^{2}), all land.

== Demographics ==
As of the census of 2000, there were 1,339 people, 433 households, and 352 families residing in the town. The population density was 37.2 people per square mile (14.4/km^{2}). There were 444 housing units at an average density of 12.3 per square mile (4.8/km^{2}). The racial makeup of the town was 98.58% White, 0.07% African American, 0.37% Native American, 0.67% Asian, and 0.30% from two or more races. Hispanic or Latino of any race were 0.52% of the population.

There were 433 households, out of which 42.7% had children under the age of 18 living with them, 71.6% were married couples living together, 3.5% had a female householder with no husband present, and 18.5% were non-families. 14.3% of all households were made up of individuals, and 5.1% had someone living alone who was 65 years of age or older. The average household size was 3.09 and the average family size was 3.45.

In the town, the population was spread out, with 31.9% under the age of 18, 8.4% from 18 to 24, 31.5% from 25 to 44, 20.2% from 45 to 64, and 8.1% who were 65 years of age or older. The median age was 34 years. For every 100 females, there were 106.3 males. For every 100 females age 18 and over, there were 110.1 males.

The median income for a household in the town was $56,406, and the median income for a family was $63,594. Males had a median income of $38,333 versus $24,803 for females. The per capita income for the town was $20,481. About 2.8% of families and 3.6% of the population were below the poverty line, including 5.7% of those under age 18 and none of those age 65 or over.
