= Harvey Larsen =

American politician

Harvey E. Larsen (September 8, 1879 – 1960) was a member of the Wisconsin State Assembly.

== Personal life ==
Larson was born in Green Bay, Wisconsin on September 8, 1879 to Hans Larsen (1843–1886), an immigrant from Engelstrup, Denmark, and his wife Maren (1842–1914). He died in 1960 and is buried at Eastside Cemetery in Denmark, Wisconsin.

== Political career ==
Larsen was elected to the Assembly in 1946, 1950 and 1952. He was also chairman of Denmark, Wisconsin. He was a Republican.
