= David Cooper Ayres =

19th century American physician and politician

D. Cooper Ayres

Member of the Wisconsin State Assembly from the Brown 2nd district
- In office January 2, 1871 – January 6, 1873
- Preceded by: Michael Dockry
- Succeeded by: William H. Bartran
- In office January 6, 1868 – January 4, 1869
- Preceded by: Randall Wilcox
- Succeeded by: Randall Wilcox

Personal details
- Born: January 25, 1820 Dayton, Ohio, U.S.
- Died: February 1, 1890 (aged 70) Brooklyn, New York, U.S.
- Resting place: Green-Wood Cemetery, Brooklyn, New York
- Party: Republican
- Spouses: Rosetta Chapeze (m. 1844; died 1845); Mary Frances Camp (died 1871); Susan Augusta Cotton (m. 1874–1890)
- Children: James Cooper Ayres^{(b. 1849; died 1899)}; Rosetta (Headley)^{(b. 1853; died 1932)}; Frank Camp Ayres^{(b. 1866; died 1947)}
- Nickname: "The Fighting Surgeon of the Seventh"

Military service
- Allegiance: United States
- Branch/service: United States Volunteers; Union Army
- Years of service: 1861–1865
- Rank: Surgeon, USV
- Unit: 7th Reg. Wis. Vol. Infantry
- Battles/wars: American Civil War

David Cooper Ayres (January 25, 1820 – February 1, 1890) was a Wisconsin medical doctor who was a military surgeon during the American Civil War and served three one-year terms as a member of the Wisconsin State Assembly. In historical documents his name is often abbreviated as D. Cooper Ayres.

== Background ==
Ayres was born January 25, 1820, in Dayton, Ohio, son of Stephen Cooper Ayres and Comfort Day Ayres. He received a public school education, and graduated from the medical department of the University of New York in 1848, becoming a physician. He came to Wisconsin in 1849, first settling at Neenah with a wife and one child before moving to Green Bay in 1856 (one source says 1850), where he practiced medicine and had part ownership of a drugstore. He was one of the organizers of the Wisconsin State Medical Society, and served one term as its president.

== The Civil War ==
Ayres volunteered for service in the American Civil War and was enrolled as first assistant surgeon in the 7th Wisconsin Infantry Regiment, part of the famous Iron Brigade of the Army of the Potomac. In April 1862, regiment surgeon Henry Palmer was promoted to brigade surgeon, and Ayres was promoted to replace him as regiment surgeon. Ayres served with the regiment through the rest of the war, through Gainesville, Antietam, and Gettysburg. When the regiment's 3 year enlistment expired, Ayres re-enlisted as a veteran with the rest of the regiment, serving through the Overland Campaign and the Siege of Petersburg. Ayres was known to pick up a musket and fight along with the regiment when the situation called for it, and was consequently given the nickname "the Fighting Surgeon of the Seventh". He supposedly turned down an offer of a colonelship from General Lysander Cutler, since it would interfere with his medical work.

During one incident when the field hospital where Ayres worked had been captured by the Rebels, General Jubal Early sent his compliments to Ayres and asked whether the Yankees would like some whiskey for their patients. Ayres responded, "Does a duck like to swim?" Early sent two full pails of whiskey, which reportedly aided the patients in this pre-anesthetic era.

He was discharged in July 1865, and returned to Green Bay.

== Politics and elective office ==
Although he had made an unsuccessful bid in 1858 for the 11th Wisconsin Legislature (losing to Democrat Edgar Conklin) Ayres was first elected to the Assembly from the 1st Brown County district (the Towns of Eaton, Glenmore, Green Bay, Humboldt, Morrison, New Denmark, Preble and Scott and the City of Green Bay) for the 1868 session (21st Wisconsin Legislature) as a Republican, unseating Democratic incumbent Randall Wilcox. He was assigned to the standing committee on charitable and benevolent institutions.

He was a delegate to the National Convention in 1868, but lost his Assembly seat in the 1868 general election to Wilcox. He returned to the Assembly for the 1871 session (the 24th Wisconsin Legislature) from the same district, unseating incumbent Democrat Michael Dockry with 816 votes to Dockry's 756. While still a Republican, he defined his "political sentiments" as Republican, Protection to all American industries, Universal Suffrage, (Female inclusive) and one term for all State and County officers. He was assigned to the committees on medical societies and on roads, bridges and ferries.

He was re-elected in 1871 for the 25th Wisconsin Legislature (1872 session) from the new 2nd Brown County district, drastically changed by redistricting to encompass Fort Howard, now called a "borough", and the Towns of Howard, Lawrence, Pittsfield, Suamico, West De Pere and Wrightstown, with 470 votes to 458 for Democrat A. F. Lyon. He was re-assigned to the committee on medical societies.

== Personal life and later years ==
Soon after returning to civilian life, Ayres bought a farm and a sawmill at what was then called Duck Creek and moved his medical practice there, developing a large custom among the Oneida Nation of Wisconsin at their nearby reservation. In 1872 his wife died, leaving him with two sons and a daughter. He was not a candidate for re-election to the Assembly, and was succeeded by William H. Bartran, who like himself was a physician from upstate New York, a Republican and a Union Civil War veteran. Instead, he returned with his children to Green Bay.

In 1875, Ayres married S. Augusta (Cotton) Bogart of Brooklyn. They remained in Green Bay until the fall of 1887, when they left to winter in California. After returning to Wisconsin in the summer of 1888, they toured various cities from Chicago to New York City, Brooklyn (then a separate city), Washington, D.C. and elsewhere. They returned to Green Bay for the National Encampment of the G.A.R. in 1889, then departed for Brooklyn, where they would spend most of their time until Ayres' death there on February 1, 1890. He was buried at Greenwood Cemetery in Green Bay.

Wisconsin State Assembly
Preceded by Randall Wilcox	Member of the Wisconsin State Assembly from the Brown 1st district January 6, 1868 – January 4, 1869	Succeeded by Randall Wilcox
Preceded by Michael Dockry	Member of the Wisconsin State Assembly from the Brown 2nd district January 2, 1871 – January 6, 1873	Succeeded by William H. Bartran
