= Simon Murphy =

Simon Murphy may refer to:

- Simon Murphy (conductor) (born 1973), Australian conductor and viola player
- Simon Murphy (British politician) (born 1962), former Member of the European Parliament
- Simon J. Murphy Sr. (1820–1910), millionaire lumberman in Maine, Detroit, and Humboldt County in Northern California
- Simon J. Murphy Jr. (1851–1926), mayor of Green Bay, Wisconsin, son of Simon J. Murphy Sr.
- Simon Murphy (hurler) (born 1949), Irish retired hurler
