= William J. Fisk =

19th American politician

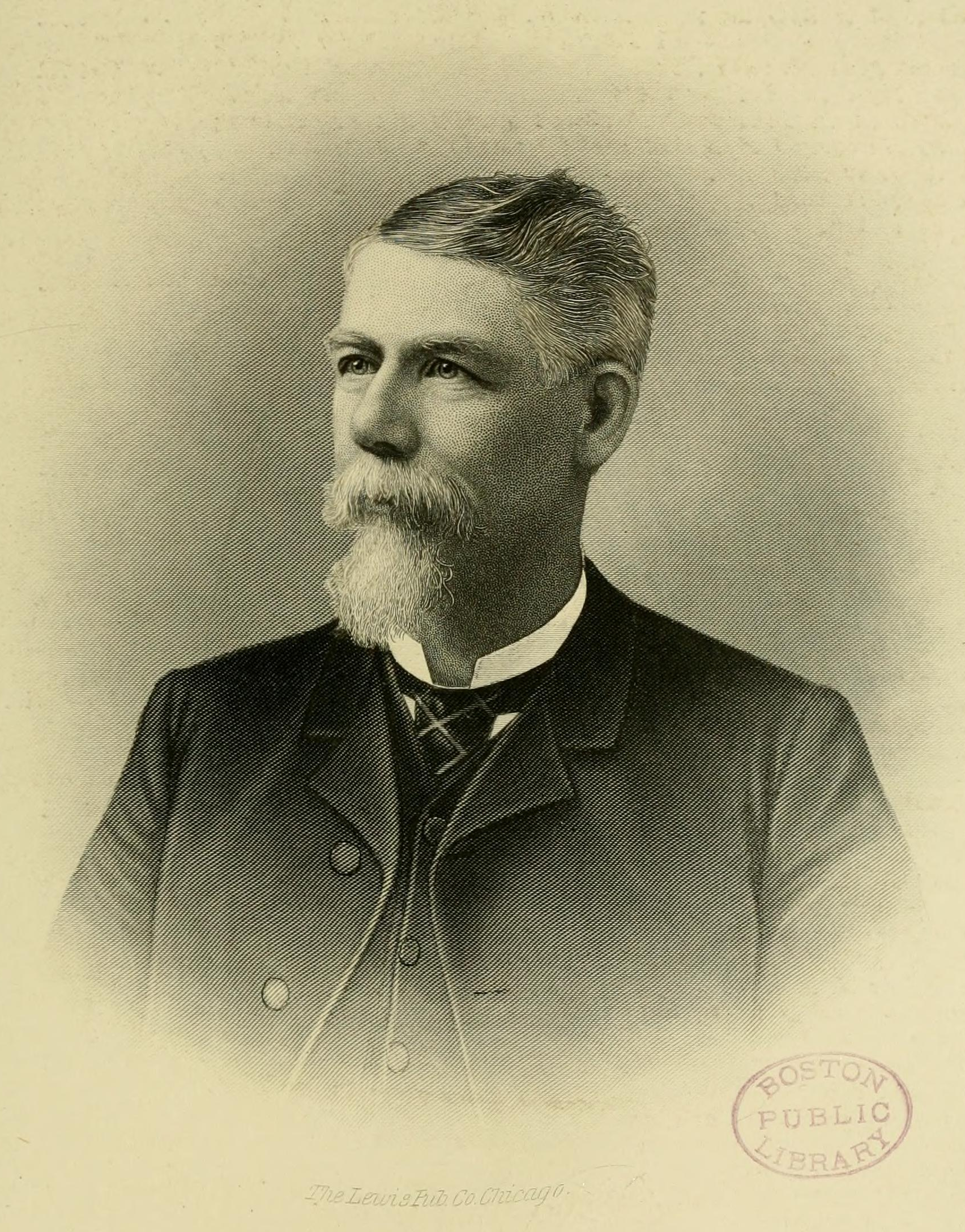
- Portrait from Fiske and Fisk Family (1896)

Member of the Wisconsin State Assembly from the Brown 2nd district
- In office January 4, 1875 – January 7, 1878
- Preceded by: William H. Bartran
- Succeeded by: David M. Burns

Personal details
- Born: June 25, 1833 Brunswick, Ohio, U.S.
- Died: March 1, 1909 (aged 75) Green Bay, Wisconsin, U.S.
- Resting place: Fort Howard Memorial Park, Green Bay, Wisconsin
- Party: Republican; Democratic (before 1861)
- Spouses: Mary J. Driggs (m. 1855; died 1903) Hattie Trowel (m. 1904–1909)
- Children: Wilbur Driggs Fisk^{(b. 1856; died 1936)}; Frank Satterlee Fisk^{(b. 1858; died 1881)}; Harry William Fisk^{(b. 1866; died 1937)}; George Wallace Fisk^{(b. 1868; died 1954)}
- Relatives: M. H. Fisk (brother); Samuel Ryan Jr. (brother-in-law)
- Education: Appleton Institute
- Occupation: Banker, politician
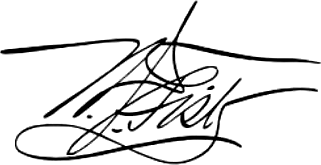
- Signature

William Justan Fisk (June 25, 1833 – March 1, 1909) was an American businessman, Republican politician, and Wisconsin pioneer. He served three years in the Wisconsin State Assembly (1875–1878), representing Brown County. He was a prominent banker in Green Bay and was one of the legislators responsible for the repeal of the railroad regulating Potter Law in 1875.

== Biography ==
Fisk was born on June 25, 1833, in Brunswick, Ohio. Shortly after his birth, his father Joel Fisk went to Green Bay, Wisconsin Territory, and found work before returning to bring young William and his mother to Wisconsin in 1836. William was raised and educated in the Green Bay area, attending school until age 14 and then going to work alongside his father, who was by that time register of the U.S. land office in Green Bay. In his role in the land office, he made extensive maps of the Indian reservation lands and lands for navigability improvements on the Fox and Wisconsin rivers.

While working for the land office, he was advised by John Fitzgerald to save his money and invest in land, and by that advice he was able to become a landowner at age 16. In 1849, he went to work for a jeweler and watchmaker, and the next year he was hired as a clerk for a Fort Howard merchant, earning $25 per month. After two years of saving his money, he was able to afford tuition at Appleton Institute in Appleton, Wisconsin.

At age 20, he returned to Fort Howard and started his own merchandise business. In his first year, he took on a contract with Chancy Lamb to provide him with 400,000 shingles for $1,000. After that deal, Fisk erected a shingle mill in Fort Howard, which became his primary business interest for the next several years. It was only the second shingle mill in the new western states. The business flourished until the Panic of 1857, which paralyzed the economy. Fisk's company remained solvent, but was stuck with 2,000,000 unsold shingles, which he had to store at a warehouse in Chicago for two years until the supply could be entirely sold off.

Fisk sold his business in 1862, and went to work campaigning for the approval of a railroad in Brown County. Fisk leveraged his personal popularity to pass the measure. With his previous business success, Fisk had become a large landowner of timbered property, and after supporting the railroad he received a contract to furnish timber for the railroad construction. It was the beginning of a long business relationship with the Northwestern Railroad, in which he provided timber for several of the railroad's expansion projects in Wisconsin.

Fisk also got into banking in the 1860s, becoming a shareholder and director of the First National Bank of Green Bay in 1865. He suffered a severe financial loss in 1871 due to Peshtigo fire, which destroyed about 10,000 acres of his timber land, but he doubled down on his banking interests. He became president of the Green Bay City National Bank, which was absorbed by the Kellogg National Bank in 1874. At that time, Fisk became a vice president of Kellogg National Bank. He remained affiliated with that bank for most of the rest of his life, and took over as president of the bank in 1891 following the death of the bank's founder, Rufus Kellogg. He retired in 1902, due to deteriorating health.

== Political career ==
Politically, Fisk was originally affiliated with the Democratic Party, but joined the Republican Party shortly after its creation, voting for Abraham Lincoln in the 1860 United States presidential election. Under Lincoln, Fisk was appointed postmaster and was elected alderman and city treasurer in Fort Howard. By the 1870s, he also strongly opposed Democratic Party efforts to regulate railroads in Wisconsin. He was elected to his first term in the Wisconsin State Assembly in 1874, running against the railroad regulations that had passed earlier that year. He was re-elected in 1875 and 1876.

In the 1875 legislative term, Fiske was chairman of the Assembly committee on railroads, which drafted the repeal of the railroad regulating Potter Law.

== Personal life and family ==
William J. Fisk was the eldest of seven children born to Judge Joel S. Fisk and his wife, Charlotte Ann (née Green). Joel Fisk was an important pioneer of Green Bay, Wisconsin, responsible for the first lumber mill constructed in that area and the first grist mill at Fond du Lac, Wisconsin. He also served several years as postmaster at Green Bay and register of the U.S. Land Office. The Fisk family were descended from Phinehas Fiske, a Puritan, who fled persecution in England and came to the Massachusetts Bay Colony about 1642, becoming one of the first settlers at Wenham, Massachusetts.

William Fisk's brother Melancton Hogeboom Fisk was a prominent physician in early Wisconsin and served as the first mayor of De Pere, Wisconsin, after its incorporation as a city in 1883.

Another brother, Valentine Saterlee Fisk, traveled to Kansas at the outbreak of the American Civil War and enlisted in the 8th Kansas Infantry Regiment, serving for three years and mustering out with the rank of captain.

William Fisk married Mary J. Driggs at Fond du Lac, Wisconsin, on January 8, 1855. Mary's sister, Martha, married Samuel Ryan Jr., another important pioneer of the Fox Valley area and founder of the Appleton Crescent newspaper. William and Mary had four sons together and were married for over 48 years before her death in 1903. Their son Wilbur D. Fisk later became treasurer of Fort Howard. William and another son, Harry, were partners of their father in business and later took over most of his interests, using the firm name W. D. Fisk and Co.

After Mary's death in 1903, William Fisk remarried. His second wife was Hattie Trowel of Milwaukee; they were married November 21, 1904. Fisk died just four and a half years later at his home in Green Bay on March 1, 1909.

Wisconsin State Assembly
| Preceded by William H. Bartran | Member of the Wisconsin State Assembly from the Brown 2nd district January 4, 1875 – January 7, 1878 | Succeeded by David M. Burns |
