= Otto and Hilda Gretzinger House =

Historic house in Wisconsin, United States

- U.S. National Register of Historic Places
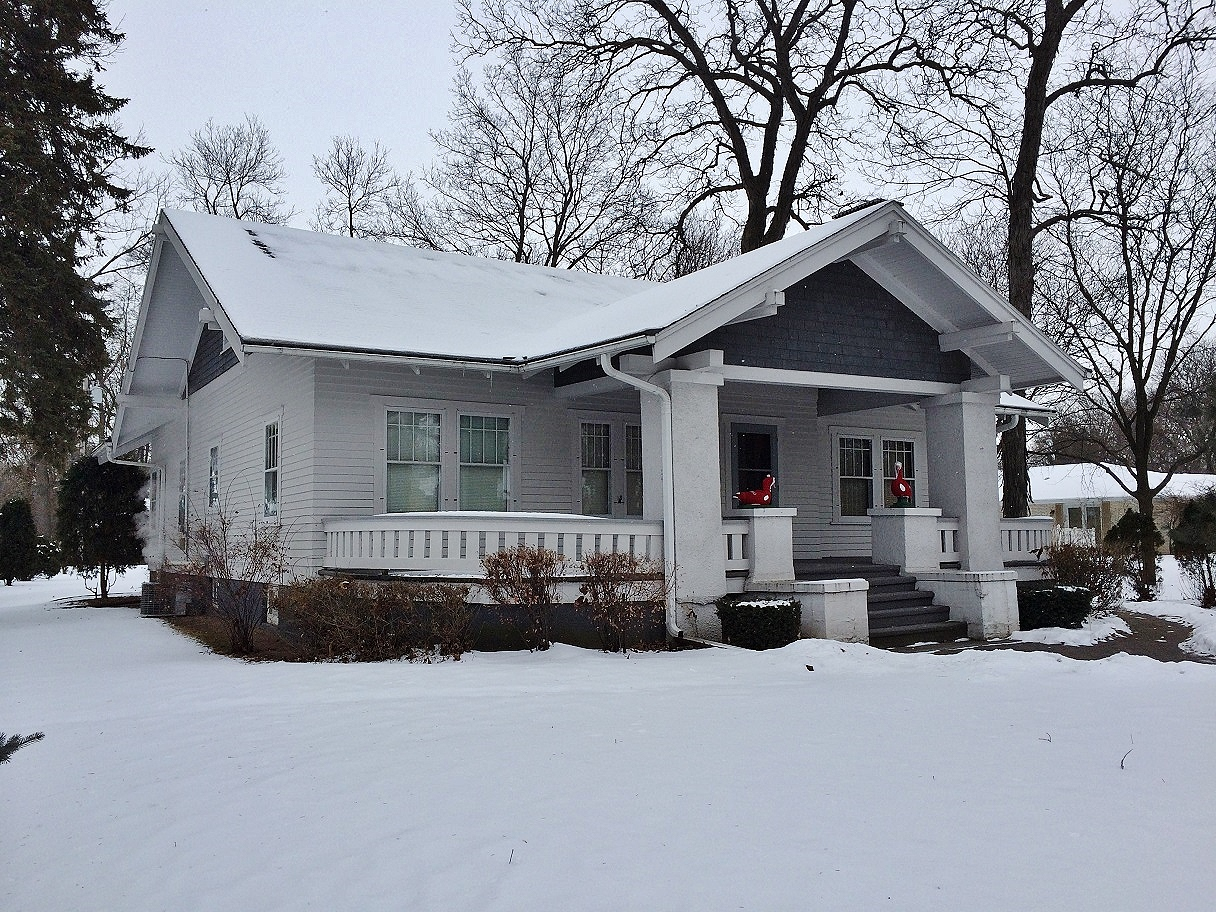
- Otto and Hilda Gretzinger House

- Location within Wisconsin Location within the United States
- Location: 922 N. Broadway; De Pere, Wisconsin
- Coordinates: 44°27′28″N 88°03′22″W
- Built: 1915-1916
- Architectural style: Bungalow/American Craftsman
- NRHP reference No.: 11000747
- Added to NRHP: October 13, 2011

The Otto and Hilda Gretzinger House is a historic house in De Pere, Wisconsin.

It is a side-gabled Craftsman-style bungalow with wide eaves and a large front porch. The porch is unusual for this style in having curved ends of its terrace. The interior is intact and is "notable for its fine built-ins and for the high quality of the materials used."

== History ==
The house was originally owned by Otto Gretzinger, the manager of a local lumber company, the Central Lumber Company, and his wife, Hilda, a schoolteacher. Otto and Hilda were wed in 1915 and soon after purchased the property where they would build their home, which was completed the following year.

In 2011, the house was added to both the State Register of Historic Places and the National Register of Historic Places.

It is located adjacent to the North Broadway Street Historic District, listed on the National Register in 1983, which includes houses at 903, 1915, and 935 North Broadway.
