= Randall Wilcox =

19th century American politician

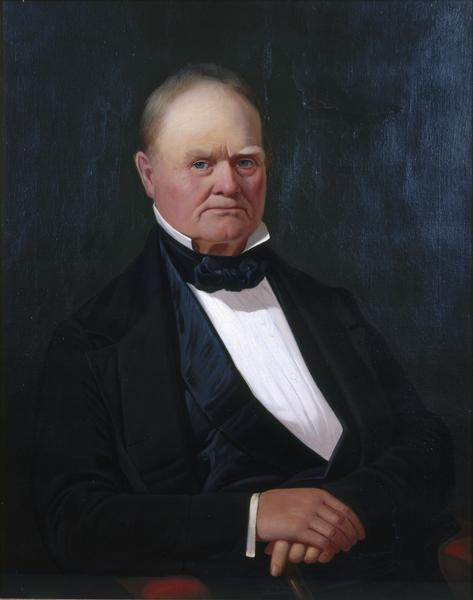
- 1856 portrait by Samuel Marsden Brookes

Member of the Wisconsin State Assembly from the Brown 2nd district
- In office January 4, 1869 – January 3, 1870
- Preceded by: David Cooper Ayres
- Succeeded by: Michael Dockry
- In office January 7, 1867 – January 6, 1868
- Preceded by: William J. Abrams (whole county)
- Succeeded by: David Cooper Ayres

1st, 3rd, & 5th Village President of De Pere, Wisconsin
- In office April 1863 – April 1865
- Preceded by: Dominicus Jordan
- Succeeded by: Joseph G. Lawton
- In office April 1861 – April 1862
- Preceded by: Abiatha B. Williams
- Succeeded by: Dominicus Jordan
- In office April 1857 – April 1859
- Preceded by: Position established
- Succeeded by: Abiatha B. Williams

Member of the Wisconsin State Assembly from the Brown–Door–Kewaunee district
- In office January 3, 1853 – January 2, 1854
- Preceded by: District established
- Succeeded by: Francis X. Desnoyers

Chairman of the Board of Supervisors of Brown County, Wisconsin
- In office January 1, 1848 – April 1852
- Preceded by: Position established
- Succeeded by: Jonathan Wheelock

Member of the Council of the Wisconsin Territory for Brown, Calumet, Fond du Lac, Manitowoc, Marquette, Portage, Sheboygan & Winnebago counties
- In office January 6, 1845 – January 4, 1847
- Preceded by: Morgan Lewis Martin
- Succeeded by: Mason C. Darling

Personal details
- Born: November 9, 1793 Lee, Massachusetts, U.S.
- Died: October 18, 1872 (aged 78) De Pere, Wisconsin, U.S.
- Resting place: Woodlawn Cemetery, Allouez, Wisconsin
- Party: Democratic
- Spouse: Lydia Colewell Field (m. 1817–1872)
- Children: Mary Catherine (Arndt)^{(b. 1823; died 1891)}; Sarah A. (Robinson)^{(b. 1828; died 1852)}; Martha Ann (Robinson)^{(b. 1829; died 1859)}

Randall Wilcox (November 9, 1793 – October 18, 1872) was an American businessman, politician, and Wisconsin pioneer. He was the first village president of De Pere, Wisconsin, and played an important role in the early work to develop the Fox River system for navigability. He also served three terms in the Wisconsin State Assembly and—prior to Wisconsin statehood—he served two years on the Wisconsin Territory council during the 4th Wisconsin Territorial Assembly.

== Biography ==
Randall Wilcox was born in Lee, Massachusetts, in 1793. As a child, he moved to Pennsylvania, with his parents, where he was raised and educated. He worked on many bridge and dam projects in Pennsylvania and Maryland.

He moved west to the Wisconsin Territory in 1836, and settled on a plot of land along the Fox River, in the area that is now De Pere, Wisconsin. He quickly became involved in bridge and dam construction again, and became affiliated with pioneer John Penn Arndt as president of his De Pere Hydraulic Company, where he managed the building of the first lock and dam on the Fox River. At the same time, Wilcox became entangled with the recently established De Pere Bank, and, in the midst of the Panic of 1837, attempted to backstop the bank with a $20,000 loan from his own savings (about $640,000 adjusted for inflation to 2023). His loan did not save the bank, so Wilcox became the owner of all the bank's assets, though this did not come close to covering his losses.

In 1838, the territorial legislature named the area around their settlement as the town of "Wilcox", named for Randall Wilcox. The next year, however, that town was divided—the area east of the Fox River became the town of De Pere and the area west of the river was re-absorbed into the town of Howard.

In 1844, Wilcox was elected to represent the northeast quadrant of Wisconsin on the council (upper house of the legislature). He served in the 3rd and 4th sessions of the 4th Wisconsin Territorial Assembly.

After Wisconsin achieved statehood, Wilcox was the first chairman of the Brown County board of supervisors under state government, and remained in that office until 1852.

In 1852, he was elected to his first term in the Wisconsin State Assembly, running on the Democratic Party ticket. He served in the 6th Wisconsin Legislature and did not run for re-election in 1853.

In 1857, the Legislature passed an act incorporating the village of De Pere. At the charter election, Wilcox was chosen as the first president of De Pere. He was re-elected to another term in 1858 and subsequently won three more one-year terms in 1861, 1863, and 1864. In 1864, Wilcox was also a Democratic candidate for presidential elector on behalf of George B. McClellan.

He returned to the Assembly in 1867, and again in 1869.

== Personal life and family ==
Randall Wilcox was one of at least six children born to Edward Wilcox and his wife Deborah (née Bailey). He married Lydia Field in 1817, at Lewisburg, Pennsylvania. They had three daughters.

Their eldest daughter Mary Catherine married John Wallace Arndt, the son of De Pere pioneer John Penn Arndt and the brother of Charles C. P. Arndt, who was infamously killed by a fellow councilmember during an 1842 session of the Wisconsin Territory Council.

Two other daughters, Sarah and Martha Ann, were married to Charles D. Robinson, in 1846, and his brother, Albert C. Robinson, in 1853, respectively. At the time, the Robinson brothers were operating the partisan Democratic newspaper the Green Bay Advocate. George Robinson went on to become Secretary of State of Wisconsin and mayor of Green Bay.

Wilcox died on October 17, 1872.

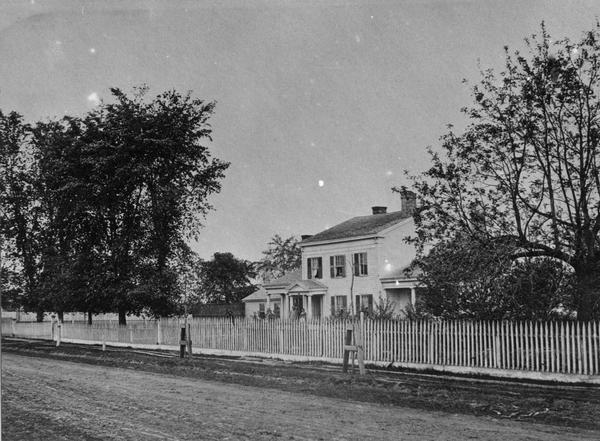
Wilcox home c.1867

The former Wilcox home in De Pere is still standing, at 707 North Broadway Street, and is now part of the North Broadway Street Historic District in the National Register of Historic Places.

Wisconsin State Assembly
District established by 1852 Wis. Act 499	Member of the Wisconsin State Assembly from the Brown–Door–Kewaunee district January 3, 1853 – January 2, 1854	Succeeded by Francis X. Desnoyers
Preceded by William J. Abrams (whole county)	Member of the Wisconsin State Assembly from the Brown 2nd district January 7, 1867 – January 6, 1868	Succeeded by David Cooper Ayres
Preceded by David Cooper Ayres	Member of the Wisconsin State Assembly from the Brown 2nd district January 4, 1869 – January 3, 1870	Succeeded by Michael Dockry
