= J. H. Tayler =

American banker and politician (1859–1959)

29th Mayor of Green Bay, Wisconsin
- In office April 1902 – April 1904
- Preceded by: Simon J. Murphy Jr.
- Succeeded by: Robert E. Minahan

9th Mayor of Fort Howard, Wisconsin
- In office April 1889 – April 1891
- Preceded by: Albert L. Gray
- Succeeded by: William H. Bartran

Personal details
- Born: February 7, 1859 Fort Howard, Wisconsin, U.S.
- Died: May 25, 1959 (aged 100) Green Bay, Wisconsin, U.S.
- Resting place: Fort Howard Memorial Park, Green Bay
- Party: Republican
- Spouse: Eleanor Jane Richardson (m. 1889; died 1951)
- Children: George R. Tayler^{(b. 1892; died 1892)}; Eleanor Kennan (Smith)^{(b. 1896; died 1993)}
- Occupation: Banker

Joseph Henry Tayler (February 7, 1859 – May 25, 1959) was an American banker and Republican politician from the U.S. state of Wisconsin. He was the 29th mayor of Green Bay, Wisconsin, and the ninth mayor of Fort Howard, Wisconsin. In 1932, he was one of several bank officers criminally charged for embezzlement and participating in a fraud to conceal the financial condition of the McCartney National Bank of Green Bay—he ultimately served four years in federal prison. His name was frequently abbreviated as J. H. Tayler, and his last name is often misspelled Taylor.

== Early life and career ==
Joseph Tayler was born in Fort Howard, Wisconsin, on February 7, 1859. He lived nearly his entire life in this area, and Fort Howard was absorbed into the city of Green Bay in 1895. During his youth, his father was postmaster at Fort Howard, and he began his working life as an assistant postmaster to his father—working in that capacity for ten years. During this time, he also served two years as city treasurer, an office that his father also held at one time.

In 1881, he went into business with David McCartney in forming the McCartney Exchange Bank. McCartney was president of the bank and Tayler served as comptroller. This organization continued until they re-incorporated as the McCartney National Bank, with the same officers, in 1892. Tayler remained affiliated as an officer of the McCartney National Bank for nearly 50 years, during which time he also served as an officer of the Farmers' and Traders' Bank of Wrightstown. He also became a director of the Fort Howard Water Works Company in the 1890s, which supplied drinking water to the city.

== Political career ==
Throughout his business career, Tayler was active in local politics with the Republican Party of Wisconsin. He was elected to two consecutive terms as mayor of Fort Howard in 1889 and 1890. Fort Howard was absorbed into the city of Green Bay in 1895, and Tayler was subsequently elected to a two-year term as mayor of Green Bay in 1902, defeating the incumbent mayor Simon J. Murphy, Jr. Tayler did not run for re-election in 1904.

== Embezzlement charges ==
In the midst of the Great Depression, by 1931, Tayler had served as an officer of the McCartney National Bank for nearly 50 years, had recently ended a term as president of the bank, and was then serving as chairman of the board. His long-time colleague George A. Richardson had been elected president of the bank in January of that year. Richardson suddenly committed suicide four months later, on May 21, 1931. A week later the bank failed and was placed under the authority of federal bank regulators.

As the bank's books were examined, attention fell on the officers, several of whom were eventually indicted. Tayler was charged by the federal government that he embezzled at least $600,000 from the bank for himself and for companies he was invested in. He was arrested from a hospital bed in Oconomowoc, Wisconsin, where doctors claimed he was suffering from a heart lesion.

Tayler was ultimately convicted and sentenced to ten years in federal prison. He served four years in Leavenworth before being paroled in 1936.

He returned to Green Bay and obtained employment as a bookkeeper for a grocery business, where he worked until age 93.

== Personal life and family ==
J. H. Tayler was the youngest of at least six children born to Joseph Tayler and his wife Melissa Victorine (née Kennan).

J. H. Tayler married Eleanor J. Richardson on June 27, 1889. They had two children together, though their first child died in infancy. Taylor lived to age 100, dying at his home in Green Bay on May 25, 1959.

== Electoral history ==
=== Green Bay Mayor (1902) ===
Green Bay Mayoral Election, 1902
Party	Candidate	Votes	%	±%
General Election, April 1, 1902
Republican	J. H. Tayler	1,909	53.44%	
Democratic	Simon J. Murphy Jr. (incumbent)	1,663	46.56%	
Plurality		246	6.89%	
Total votes		3,572	100.0%	
Republican gain from Democratic				

Political offices
Preceded by Albert L. Gray	Mayor of Fort Howard, Wisconsin; April 1889 – April 1891	Succeeded by William H. Bartran
Preceded by Simon J. Murphy Jr.	Mayor of Green Bay, Wisconsin; April 1902 – April 1904	Succeeded by Robert E. Minahan
