= North Broadway Street Historic District =

Historic district in Wisconsin, United States

- U.S. National Register of Historic Places
- U.S. Historic district
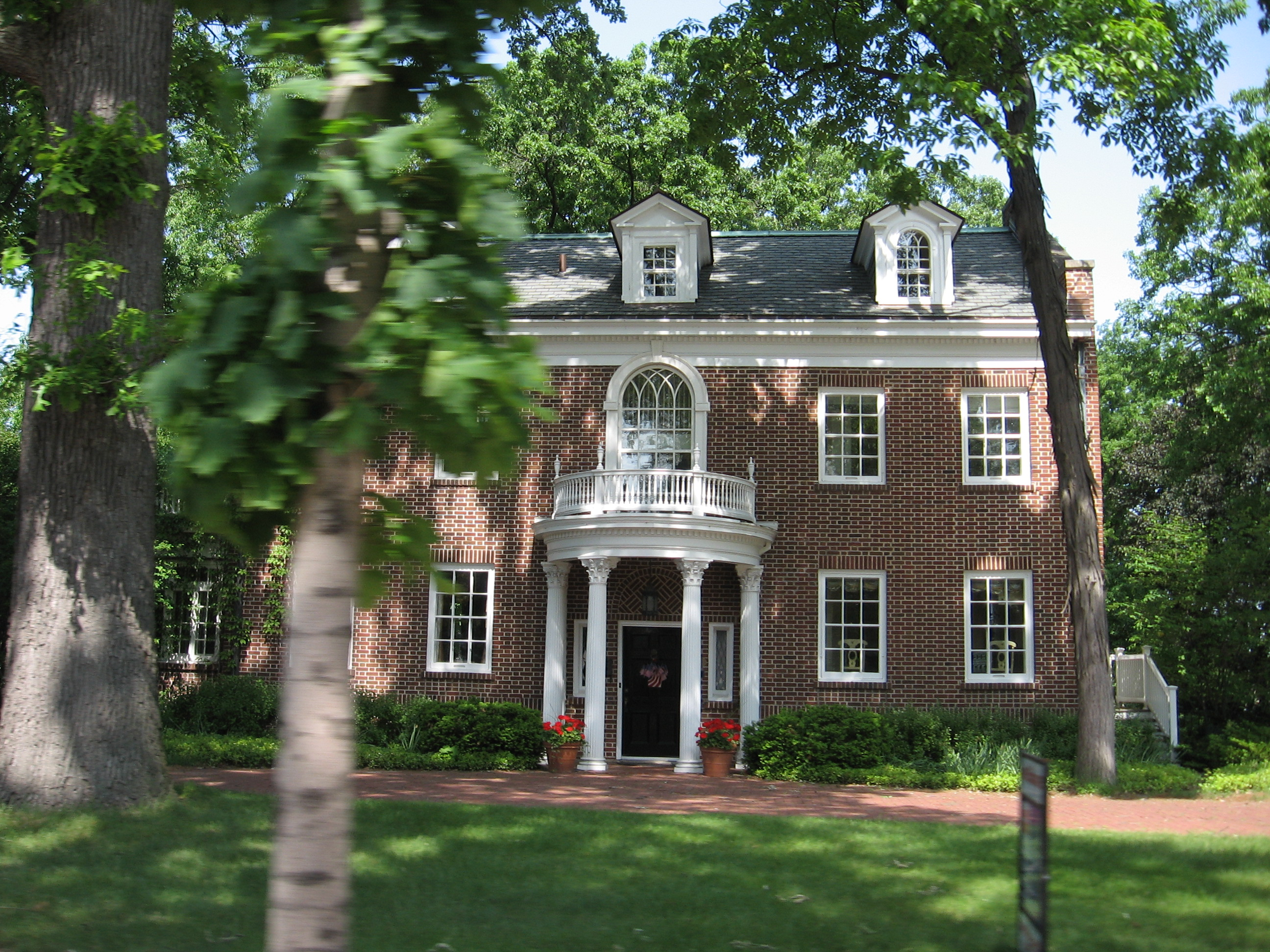
- E.P. Smith Residence, 903 N. Broadway St.

- Location within Wisconsin Location within the United States
- Location: Broadway, Ridgeway Blvd., Morris, Fulton, Franklin, Cass, Front, and Wisconsin Sts., De Pere, Wisconsin
- Coordinates: 44.453889°N 88.060278°W
- Area: 28 acres (11 ha)
- NRHP reference No.: 83003368
- Added to NRHP: September 8, 1983

The North Broadway Street Historic District is a 28-acre (11 ha) historic district in De Pere, Wisconsin which was listed on the National Register of Historic Places in 1983. It included 47 contributing buildings and seven non-contributing ones.

The district is located on the north side of De Pere. Contributing buildings within its boundaries were constructed from 1836 to 1923 and were built in a variety of architectural styles.

Buildings deemed to have "pivotal" historic importance within the district (with building # as in NRHP document, and photo # as in linked photos) are:

- Kellogg-McGeehan Residence, 515 N. Broadway St., a two-story frame house with, on its front facade, a projecting pavilion and a full-length one-story veranda
- J.S. Chase Residence, 602 N. Broadway St., a two-and-a-half-story Queen Anne house with a square tower. Its "architectural character" has been "compromised by siding"
- H.J. Wheeler Residence, 620 N. Broadway St., a brick house with a shingled mansard roof and a recessed corner tower (building #33, photo #34) (Note: This might be deemed to be Second Empire in style.)
- F.A. Dunham Residence, 639 N. Broadway St., a two-story-plus-attic house with a tower. Its interior was remodeled in 1925 to Stick/Shingle fashion.
- Randall Wilcox Residence, 707 N. Broadway St., with two-story central flanked by one-story wings. It has Greek Revival-style entablatures.
- E.E. Bolles Residence, 721 N. Broadway St., built as a large Queen Anne house, but its picturesque massing was reduced by early 20th-century renovations. It has a historic one-story carriage house at the rear.
- A.G. Wells Residence, 807 N. Broadway St., a large two-and-a-half-story "English eclectic manor of stone, with stucco and wood trim"
- John P. Dousman Residence, 813 N. Broadway St., a late Queen Anne cottage
- John S. Gittens Residence, 823 N. Broadway St., built as a two-and-a-half-story gambrel roof Colonial Revival, it received a gable-front compatible addition
- E.P. Smith Residence, 903 N. Broadway St., a red brick house with original interior woodwork and Adamsesque fireplace (building #23, photo #21)
- Capt. Joseph G. Lawton Residence, 935 N. Broadway St., a stone Italianate house whose appearance was accomplished in 1914 and 1920 remodelings. An earlier 1858 stone house, of Captain Joseph Lawton, appears not to have survived within.
- Gustave H. Fleck Residence, 432 N. Wisconsin St., with elements of Queen Anne and Colonial Revival style
- F.E. White Residence, 421 Cass St., a two-story frame Greek Revival house with a veranda having square columns topped by square Doric capitals.
- Jacob Falk Residence, 321 N. Wisconsin St., a Queen Anne cottage with a corner tower and a veranda.

== See also ==
- Otto and Hilda Gretzinger House, at 922 N. Broadway, across from several houses in this district, was separately listed on the National Register in 2011.
