= M. H. Fisk =

19th century American physician

M. H. Fisk M.D.
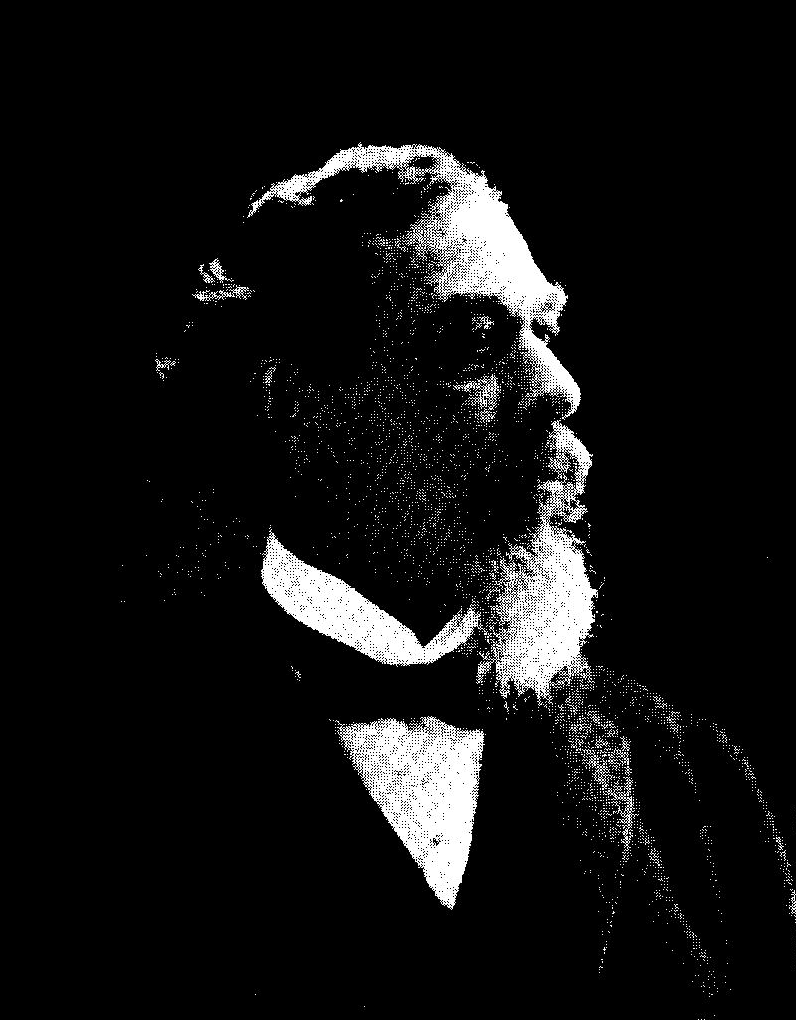
- Portrait from Men of Progress, Wisconsin (1897)

1st Mayor of De Pere, Wisconsin
- In office April 1883 – April 1886
- Preceded by: Position established
- Succeeded by: John Smith

Personal details
- Born: May 28, 1843 De Pere, Wisconsin, U.S.
- Died: December 3, 1906 (aged 63) Wauwatosa, Wisconsin, U.S.
- Cause of death: Cancer
- Resting place: Wauwatosa Cemetery, Wauwatosa
- Spouse: Mary Joy Lawton (m. 1868–1906)
- Children: Raymond J. Fisk
- Relatives: William J. Fisk (brother)
- Education: Lawrence University; Ann Arbor Medical School; Bellevue Hospital Medical College
- Profession: Physician

Military service
- Allegiance: United States
- Branch/service: United States Volunteers; Union Army
- Years of service: 1864
- Rank: Private, USV
- Unit: 40th Reg. Wis. Vol. Infantry
- Battles/wars: American Civil War

Melancton Hogeboom Fisk (May 28, 1843 – December 3, 1906) was an American physician and Wisconsin pioneer. He was the first mayor of De Pere, Wisconsin. His brother, William J. Fisk, was a member of the Wisconsin State Assembly. His name was usually abbreviated as M. H. Fisk. His first name was sometimes spelled "Melancthon".

== Biography ==
M. H. Fisk was born in the town of De Pere, Wisconsin, in May 1943. He was raised and received his primary education there, but was then sent to Hopkins Academy in Hadley, Massachusetts, to prepare for higher education. He returned to Wisconsin to attend Lawrence University in Appleton, Wisconsin. While in his senior year at Lawrence, he was part of a class of Lawrence students who all enrolled for duty in the Union Army in the midst of the American Civil War, in the Spring of 1864. They became part of the 40th Wisconsin Infantry Regiment, called the "Normal Regiment" because of the large number of students and teachers in the regiment.

Fisk's Union Army service was brief but eventful. The 40th Wisconsin Infantry was a 100-day regiment, and they were sent to Memphis, Tennessee, along with the 39th Wisconsin and 41st Wisconsin, to relieve other regiments and allow them to move further south. They were defending the city during the Second Battle of Memphis, when Confederate cavalry rushed into the city attempting to free prisoners from Irving Block prison and trying to influence the Union Army to pull back forces from other fronts. The Wisconsin regiments repelled the Confederate cavalry and defended the prison. The 40th Wisconsin Infantry mustered out of federal service on September 16, 1864.

After his war service, rather than returning to Lawrence, Fisk chose to study medicine. He attended the Ann Arbor Medical School, where he completed his M.D. in 1866. He returned to De Pere and began a medical practice there. After five years, he took an additional course of study at Bellevue Hospital Medical College in New York, then returned to De Pere to continue his work.

Politically, Fisk was affiliated with the Democratic Party for most of his life, though he refused to vote for the populist William Jennings Bryan in the 1896 United States presidential election. He was active in local politics, and after the city of De Pere was incorporated in 1883, he was elected the first mayor of the city. He served three consecutive terms before leaving office in 1886, when he moved to Wauwatosa, Wisconsin. In Wauwatosa, he had an extensive medical practice and served as a consulting physician at the Milwaukee County Hospital and the Asylum for the Chronic Insane.

He suffered from cancer of the tongue for several years, and eventually died of the cancer on December 3, 1906.

== Personal life and family ==
M. H. Fisk was the sixth of seven children born to Judge Joel S. Fisk and his wife, Charlotte Ann (née Green). Joel Fisk was an important pioneer of Green Bay, Wisconsin, responsible for the first lumber mill constructed in that area and the first grist mill at Fond du Lac, Wisconsin. He also served several years as postmaster at Green Bay and register of the U.S. Land Office. The Fisk family were descended from Phinehas Fiske, a Puritan, who fled persecution in England and came to the Massachusetts Bay Colony about 1642, becoming one of the first settlers at Wenham, Massachusetts.

M. H. Fisk's eldest brother was William Justan Fisk, a prominent early businessman and Republican politician in Brown County, Wisconsin. He served three consecutive terms in the Wisconsin State Assembly in the 1870s and was an officer in several banks.

Another brother, Valentine Saterlee Fisk, traveled to Kansas at the outbreak of the American Civil War and enlisted in the 8th Kansas Infantry Regiment, serving for three years and mustering out with the rank of captain.

M. H. Fisk married Mary Joy Lawton at De Pere, on October 19, 1868. Mary Joy Lawton was the daughter of George Lawton and niece of Joseph G. Lawton. The Lawtons were descended from John Layton, a large landowner in New Netherland who feuded with Governor Peter Stuyvesant around the time of the English takeover of the colony. Fisk had two children with his wife, though one died in infancy. Their only surviving son was Raymond Dousman Fisk.

Political offices
City incorporated	Mayor of De Pere, Wisconsin; April 1883 – April 1886	Succeeded by John Smith
