= Physical Society =

A Physical Society is a professional organization or learned society of physicists, and may refer to:

- American Physical Society
- Austrian Physical Society
- Belgian Physical Society
- Brazilian Physical Society
- Chinese Physical Society
- Danish Physical Society
- Deutsche Physikalische Gesellschaft (German Physical Society)
- Estonian Physical Society
- European Physical Society
- Frankfurt Physical Society
- French Physical Society
- Indian Physical Society
- Italian Physical Society
- Korean Physical Society
- Nepal Physical Society
- Netherlands' Physical Society
- Polish Physical Society
- Spanish Royal Physical Society
- Swiss Physical Society
- Physical Society of Edinburgh
- Physical Society of Iran
- Physical Society of Japan
- Physical Society of London (now Institute of Physics)

== See also ==
- Medical Society (disambiguation)
- Bar association
- List of mathematical societies
