= North Michigan Street-North Superior Street Historic District =

Historic district in Wisconsin, United States

- North Michigan Street--North Superior Street Historic District
- U.S. National Register of Historic Places
- U.S. Historic district
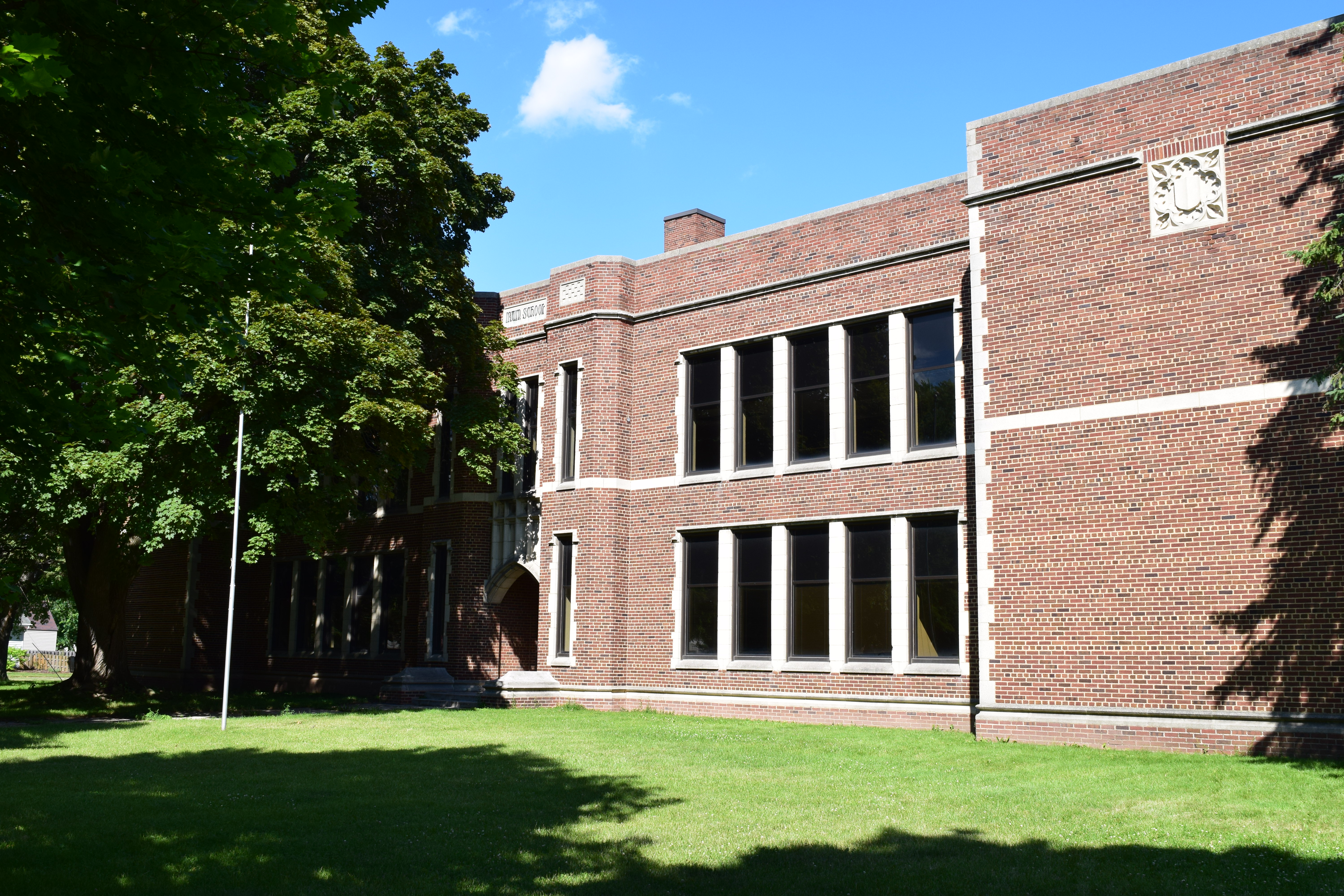
- Irwin School, located in the district.
- Location: Roughly bounded by Ridgeway Bvd., N Wisconsin, N Huron & George Sts., De Pere, Wisconsin
- Coordinates: 44.4528°N 88.05663°W
- Area: 31.5 acres (12.7 ha)
- NRHP reference No.: 07000707
- Added to NRHP: July 19, 2007

The North Michigan Street-North Superior Street Historic District is located in De Pere, Wisconsin.

== History ==
The residential neighborhood in the district is one of the oldest in Wisconsin. Some houses in it date back to the 1860s. The district was added to the State Register of Historic Places in 2006 and to the National Register of Historic Places in 2007.
