= William H. Bartran =

19th century American physician and politician

William H. Bartran M.D.

10th Mayor of Fort Howard, Wisconsin
- In office April 1891 – April 1892
- Preceded by: Joseph H. Tayler
- Succeeded by: William Larsen

Member of the Wisconsin State Assembly from the Brown 2nd district
- In office January 6, 1873 – January 4, 1875
- Preceded by: D. Cooper Ayres
- Succeeded by: William J. Fisk

Personal details
- Born: August 21, 1838 Barton, New York, U.S.
- Died: November 23, 1905 (aged 67) Green Bay, Wisconsin, U.S.
- Resting place: Fort Howard Memorial Park, Green Bay, Wisconsin
- Party: Republican
- Spouse: Margaret Smith
- Children: William Henry Bartran Jr.^{(b. 1874; died 1950)}; Marion Bartran^{(died young)}; Gertie L. Bartran^{(b. 1883; died 1892)}
- Education: University of Michigan; Michigan Medical College
- Profession: Physician

Military service
- Allegiance: United States
- Branch/service: United States Volunteers; Union Army
- Years of service: 1861
- Rank: 1st Sergeant, USV; Brevet 1st Lieutenant, USV
- Unit: 27th Reg. N.Y. Vol. Infantry
- Battles/wars: American Civil War

William Henry Bartran, Sr., (August 21, 1838 – November 23, 1905) was an American physician and Republican politician. He was the 10th mayor of Fort Howard, Wisconsin, and served two terms in the Wisconsin State Assembly, representing northwest Brown County (1873, 1874).

== Early life ==
William H. Bartran was born in the town of Barton, in Tioga County, New York, on August 21, 1838. He was raised there and received his primary education in the public schools. He attended the Wyoming Seminary in Luzerne County, Pennsylvania, but left the school after the outbreak of the American Civil War.

After hearing of the attack on Fort Sumter, he returned to New York to enlist for service in the Union Army. He was enrolled as first sergeant of Company D in the 27th New York Infantry Regiment, but his service was ultimately short. He went south with his regiment to Washington, D.C., and participated in the First Battle of Bull Run in July 1861, where he was wounded in battle and unable to return to service. He was discharged due to disability on August 1, 1861, but received an honorary brevet to first lieutenant.

After returning from the war, he entered the Michigan Medical College and graduated with his medical doctorate in 1865.

== Medical career ==
After graduating, he moved west to Green Lake County, Wisconsin, and started a medical practice in the village of Dartford. He remained for four years before moving to Flintville, in the town of Suamico, Wisconsin, in Brown County. He finally settled in the neighboring community of Fort Howard, Wisconsin, in 1871.

He was a trusted family physician and surgeon in the Green Bay area for 30 years, and was a member of the Fox River and Brown County medical societies. He served as a medical advisor to the city and county government, and was U.S. examining physician for this region for several years.

== Political career ==
Shortly after coming to Flintville, he became involved in local affairs and was elected chairman of the town board. In 1872, he was the Republican Party nominee for Wisconsin State Assembly in Brown County's 2nd Assembly district, which then comprised roughly the northwest quadrant of the county. He was subsequently re-elected in 1873. He was not a candidate for re-election in 1874.

Bartran went on to serve several years as superintendent of schools in his town. Later in life, in 1891, he was elected to a single term as mayor of Fort Howard.

== Personal life and family ==
William H. Bartran was a son of Moses Bartran and his wife Emily (née Bidlack). He had two brothers and five sisters. His brother George R. Bartran also became a medical doctor and practiced in Algoma, Wisconsin, for 30 years.

William Bartran married Margaret Smith and had three children. Their two daughters died young, but their son, William Jr., went on to graduate from the Northwestern University Medical School and practiced medicine in Green Bay, Wisconsin, for the rest of his life.

William H. Bartran, Sr., suffered from paralysis, caused by stroke, and was forced to retire from his medical practice in 1901. He died at his home in Green Bay on November 23, 1905—the city of Fort Howard having been absorbed into the city of Green Bay in 1895.

Wisconsin State Assembly
Preceded by D. Cooper Ayres	Member of the Wisconsin State Assembly from the Brown 2nd district January 6, 1873 – January 4, 1875	Succeeded by William J. Fisk
Political offices
Preceded by Joseph H. Tayler	Mayor of Fort Howard, Wisconsin; April 1891 – April 1892	Succeeded by William Larsen
