= Randall Avenue Historic District =

Historic district in Wisconsin, United States

- U.S. National Register of Historic Places
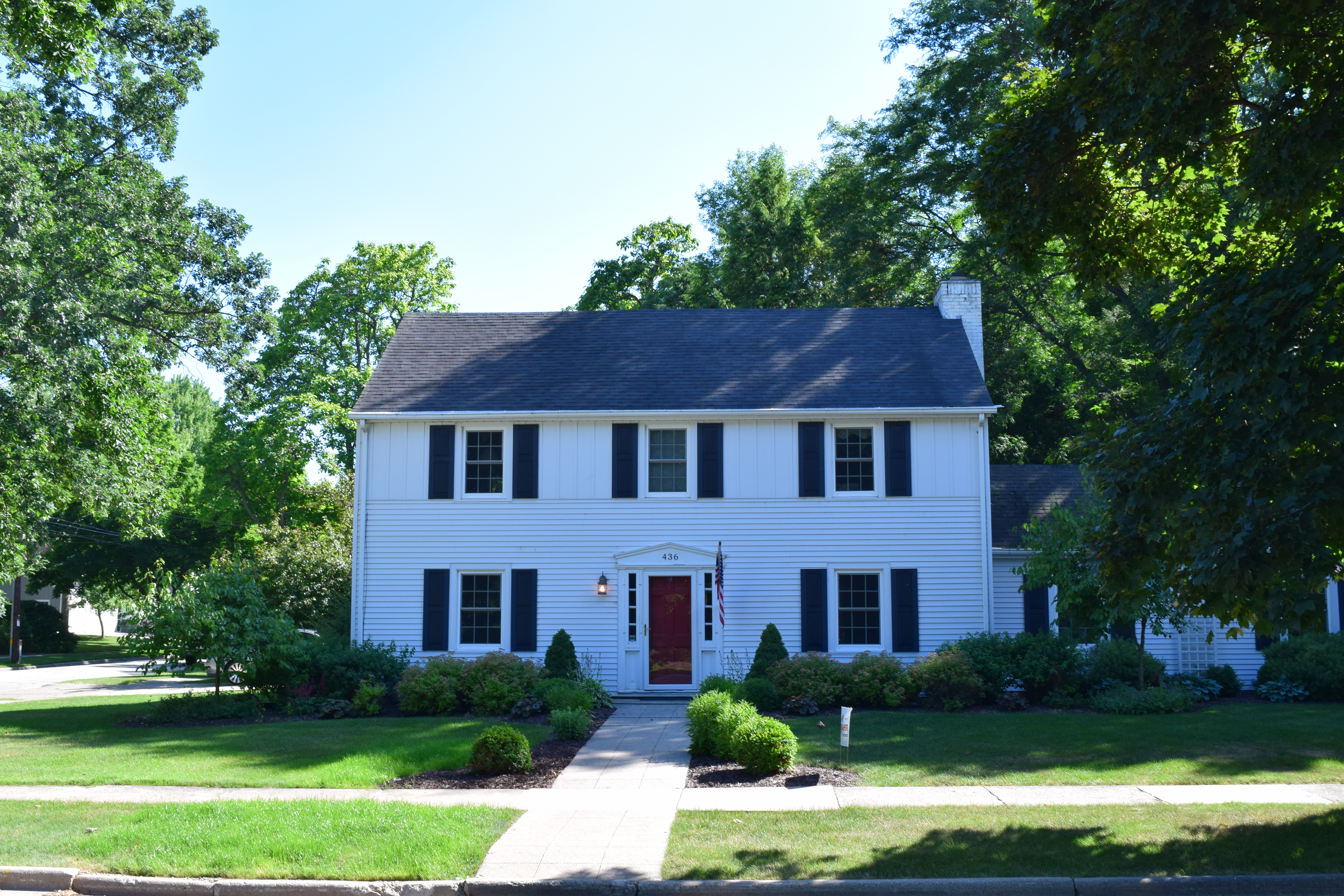
- A house within the district.

- Location within Wisconsin Location within the United States
- Location: Generally bounded by Ridgeway Blvd., Oakdale Ave. and Glenwood Ave. De Pere, Wisconsin
- Coordinates: 44°27′23″N 88°03′15″W
- NRHP reference No.: 07000370
- Added to NRHP: April 24, 2007

The Randall Avenue Historic District is located in De Pere, Wisconsin. It was added to the State Register of Historic Places in 2006 and to the National Register of Historic Places the following year. Contributing buildings in the district were constructed from 1908 to 1955.
