= De Pere Lock and Dam Historic District =

Historic district in Wisconsin, United States

- U.S. National Register of Historic Places
- U.S. Historic district
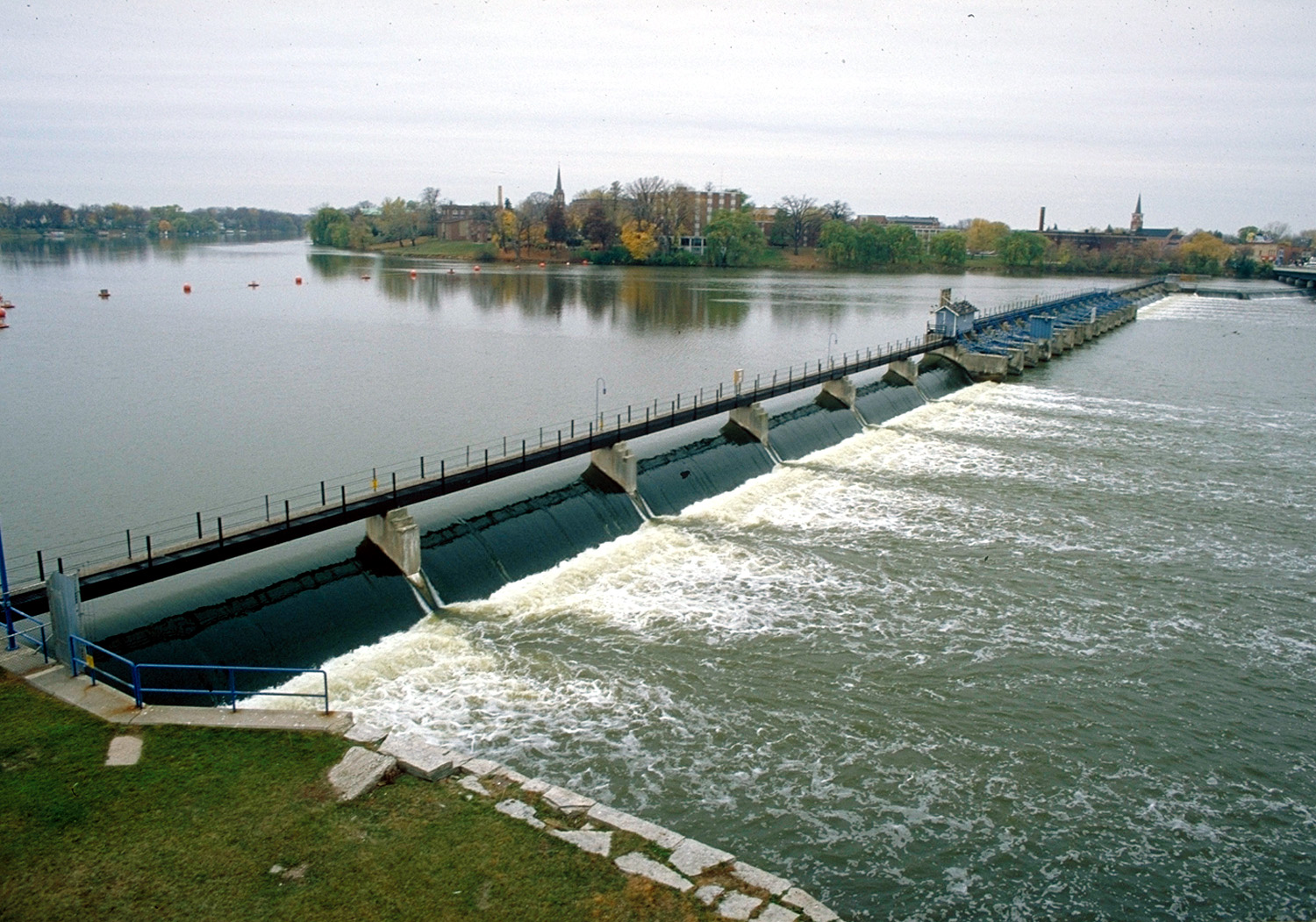
- De Pere Dam
- Location: Fox R. at James St., De Pere, Wisconsin
- Coordinates: 44°26′58″N 88°03′47″W
- Area: 2.8 acres (1.1 ha)
- MPS: Waterway Resources of the Lower Fox River MPS
- NRHP reference No.: 93001331
- Added to NRHP: December 7, 1993

The De Pere Lock and Dam Historic District is located in De Pere, Wisconsin. It was added to the State Register of Historic Places in 1992 and to the National Register of Historic Places the following year.
