= Medical Society =

The Medical Society may refer to various bodies associated with medicine or its provision, including:

== Australia ==
- University of Queensland Medical Society, see Errol Solomon Meyers Memorial Lecture

== Canada ==
- Christian Medical and Dental Society

== China ==
- Medical Missionary Society of China

== International ==
- Assyrian Medical Society
- International General Medical Society for Psychotherapy
- Medical Protection Society
- Undersea and Hyperbaric Medical Society
- World Health Organization § Medical Society of the World Health Organization

== Iran ==
- Islamic Association of Iranian Medical Society

== Norway ==
- Norwegian Medical Society

== United Kingdom ==
- Bute Medical Society
- Medical Society of Edinburgh
- Medical and Chirurgical Society of London
- Medical Society of London
- Royal Medical Society
- Ulster Medical Society
- Westminster Medical Society

== United States ==
- Colorado Medical Society
- Connecticut State Medical Society
- Illinois State Medical Society, a state affiliate of the American Medical Association
- Maryland State Medical Society (MedChi)
- Massachusetts Medical Society
- Medical Society of New Jersey
- Medical Society of the State of California, a former name of the California Medical Association
- Medical Society of Tennessee, a former name of the Tennessee Medical Association
- Michigan State Medical Society
- New York County Medical Society
- North Carolina Medical Society, see Susan Dimock
- Pennsylvania Medical Society
- Rhode Island Medical Society
- Syrian American Medical Society
- Vermont Medical Society
- Medical Society of Virginia
- Wilderness Medical Society

== See also ==
- Association of the Scientific Medical Societies in Germany
