= Albert L. Gray =

American politician

Albert Lewis Gray (January 29, 1847 – July 28, 1916) was an American dry goods merchant and politician from Fort Howard, Wisconsin.

== Life ==
Gray was born on January 29, 1847, in London, Ontario, Canada. He was married to Jane Kell Howie (1851–1899). He died on July 28, 1916, in Green Bay, Wisconsin and is buried at Fort Howard Memorial Park in Green Bay.

== Political career ==
Gray spent six non-continuous terms as a member of the Wisconsin State Assembly between 1879 and 1892, first as a member of the Greenbacker party from Green Bay and later as a Democrat, representing Brown County.

In 1906, as a city council member he was arrested and convicted of accepting bribes.
