= Simon J. Murphy Sr. =

American businessman (1815–1905)

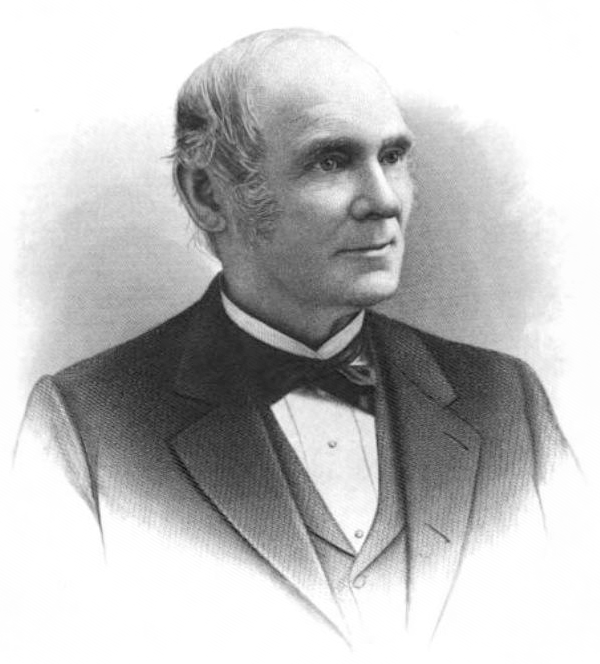
- Born: Simon Jones Murphy; April 22, 1815; Windsor, Maine, US
- Died: February 1, 1905 (aged 89); Detroit, Michigan, US
- Occupation: Businessman
- Spouse: Ann Montgomery Dorr (m. 1845; died 1903)
- Children: 12, including Simon J. Murphy Jr.

Simon Jones Murphy Sr. (April 22, 1815 – February 1, 1905) was an American businessman.

== Biography ==
Murphy was born in Windsor, Maine on April 22, 1815. He was a lumberman there, beginning as a logger on the Penobscot River and working his way up. In 1866, he moved to Michigan and worked in lumber there as well.

Operating out of Detroit, his company logged thousands of acres of Michigan pine forests. Murphy was one of the first millionaires in Detroit.

In 1887, Murphy began wintering in Whittier, California after purchasing the Ramirez Rancho. While there, he was an irrigator, citrus farmer, oilman, and real estate developer.

He was founder of both the East Whittier Land and Water Company and the Murphy Oil Company, which drilled for oil in the Puente Hills.

Murphy was an early benefactor of Whittier College. A hospital in Whittier bore his name, as does the neighborhood of Murphy Ranch, which was built on Murphy's citrus orchard.

In 1905, Murphy completed the process of gaining control of the Pacific Lumber Company, which, under Murphy's control and stewardship, would become a storied and one of the largest Coast Redwood lumber and milling operations to ever exist. At least five generations of Murphys, including Simon's son Simon Murphy Jr, Grandson Albert Stanwood Murphy, Great Grandson Stanwood Albert Murphy, and then Great great Grandson Warren Murphy managed and controlled with main offices and the bulk of its massive log decks and milling operations in the historic company town of Scotia, California through 1985.

Murphy and his company built several buildings in the Detroit Financial District. These include the Marquette Building, the Murphy Power Building, and the first Penobscot Building.

He died at his home in Detroit on February 1, 1905.

A memorial commemorating Murphy exists in the second Penobscot Building.

== Family ==
In September 1845, Murphy married Ann Montgomery Dorr (May 21, 1828, Bradley, Maine – May 30, 1903, Detroit). Ann was the daughter of Charles M. and Ann (Morse) Dorr of Bradley and Milford, ME.

Simon and Ann Murphy had 12 children, of which five sons and a daughter survived infancy:

- Charles Edmund (1846–1929) took over Murphy's real estate developments
- Simon Jones (1851–1926) a lumberman and became mayor of Green Bay, Wisconsin.
- Albert Montgomery (1852–1915)
- William Herbert (1855–1929) went into business making car bodies for luxury cars
- Annie Dorr (1857–1917)
- Frank Emery (1862–1934) also lumberman, and four-term alderman of Green Bay

Son Simon J. Murphy Jr. was a lumberman and Mayor of Green Bay, Wisconsin.

Son Frank E. Murphy, was a Lumberman, 4 term Alderman of Green Bay Wis, VP of The Morley- Murphy Company, and Developed Horse Shoe Bay Farms, in Door County Wisconsin, Frank E. Murphy Park was Donated to the Door County OF Wisconsin. In 1911 Bay View Beach was sold to Frank E. Murphy and Fred Rahr, who was owner of the Rahr's Brewing Company of Green Bay Wisconsin. In 1920 they donated the 11 acres, along with all its buildings and attractions, to the city of Green Bay. The City Of Green Bay, then commemorated Murphy Park, on Green Bay's Far West Side, to his honor of Civil Service.

Son Charles, took over Murphy's real estate developments.

Son William went into business making car bodies for luxury cars. Simon. J. Murphy's son William would thus be the main backer of Cadillac.
