= Assyrian Medical Society =

The Assyrian Medical Society is an organization that offers medical care to Assyrians around the world. Its mission is "Serving our Assyrian Brothers and Sisters"; particularly those stricken by the war and famine in Iraq since 2003. The Assyrian Medical Society was founded by Dr. Samir Johna who is the director of the organization. The Assyrian Medical Society works with local and international organizations to develop the most cost effective solutions to help Assyrian patients in the Assyrian diaspora and specifically those suffering from the war in Iraq. The vast majority of the members are volunteers. This medical society fosters health education among Assyrians and promotes the use of the Assyrian language in education.

A majority of the patients have orthopedic disabilities, spinal cords injuries, serious burns, and birth defects, most of which are the direct result of the War in Iraq.

The official website describes the organization as an independent organization, that is not affiliated with any political, religious or any other Assyrian organization.

== Key people ==
- Dr. Samir Johna, MD, FACS, co-founder and Medical Director
- Albert Davidoo, CPA, co-founder and Chairman
- Youkie Khaninia, Senior Product Engineer, co-founder and Vice Chairman
- List of complete officers

== See also ==
- Assyrian Aid Society
