= Simon J. Murphy Jr. =

American politician (1851–1926)

28th Mayor of Green Bay, Wisconsin
- In office 1899–1902
- Preceded by: Frank B. Desnoyers
- Succeeded by: J. H. Tayler

Personal details
- Born: Simon Jones Murphy Jr. March 27, 1851 Maine, U.S.
- Died: September 1, 1926 (aged 75) Pasadena, California, U.S.
- Spouse: Helena Bogardus Platt
- Children: 5
- Parent(s): Simon J. Murphy Sr. Ann Montgomery Dorr
- Education: Lawrence Scientific School
- Occupation: Politician, businessman

Simon Jones Murphy Jr. (March 27, 1851 – September 1, 1926) was an American politician and businessman who served as the 28th mayor of Green Bay, Wisconsin, from 1899 to 1902.

== Biography ==
Murphy was born Simon Jones Murphy Jr. on March 27, 1851, in Maine. His father was Simon J. Murphy Sr., a prominent lumberman. He attended primary school in Bangor, Maine and moved with his family to Detroit, Michigan, in 1866 before graduating from the Lawrence Scientific School. Murphy married Helena Bogardus Platt and the couple had five children. Murphy moved to Green Bay in 1886.

He died at his home in Pasadena, California on September 1, 1926.

== Career ==
Murphy was mayor from 1899 to 1901. He made a living by running a sawmill.
