= Fort Howard, Wisconsin =

Coordinates: 44°31′10″N 88°01′15″W

Fort Howard was a city in Brown County, Wisconsin, United States. It was first incorporated as a "borough" of 664 acres on October 13, 1856. As the result of a referendum on the union of the two cities held on April 2, 1895, the city was entirely annexed to the City of Green Bay and ceased to exist.

== Etymology ==
The city took its name from nearby Fort Howard.

== Mayors ==
Fort Howard had nine mayors in its 22 years as a city.

Order	Mayor	Entered office	Left office	Notes
1	James H. Elmore	1873	1874	Later elected mayor of Green Bay
2	David M. Burns	1874	1875	Lost re-election, later returned to office
3	George Richardson Sr.	1875	1879	
4	Mose Newald	1879	1880	
5	Christian Schwartz	1880	1881	
6	Albert L. Gray	1881	1883	Later returned to office, also served in the State Assembly
7	David M. Burns	1883	1885	
8	Albert L. Gray	1885	1889	
9	Joseph H. Tayler	1889	1891	Later elected mayor of Green Bay, later went to prison for embezzlement
10	William H. Bartran Sr.	1891	1892	Also served in the State Assembly
11	William Larsen	1892	1895	Last mayor
