= Michael Dockry =

American politician

Michael Dockry was an Irish-born American politician. He was a member of the Wisconsin State Assembly.

== Biography ==
Dockry was born on August 1, 1817, in County Roscommon, Ireland. After residing in Washington County, Wisconsin, he moved to Holland, Brown County, Wisconsin.

== Assembly career ==
Dockry was a member of the Assembly during the 1870 session. He was a Democrat.
