= De Pere, Wisconsin =

- City
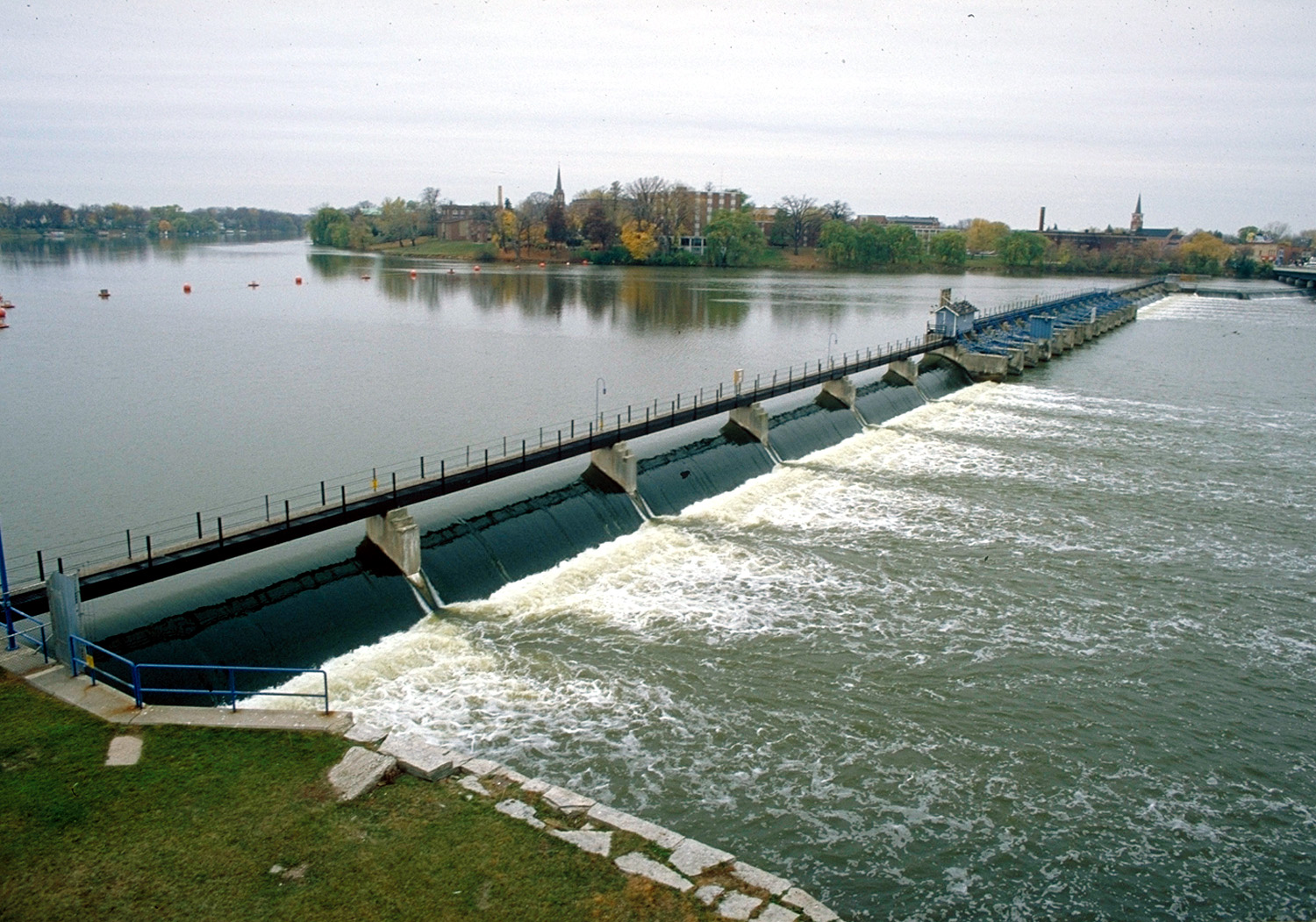
- De Pere Dam on the Fox River at De Pere
- Motto: "Runs Deeper"
- Location of De Pere in Brown County, Wisconsin

- Location within Wisconsin Location within the United States
- Coordinates: 44°26′46″N 88°4′27″W
- Country: United States
- State: Wisconsin
- County: Brown
- Incorporated (village): March 6, 1857
- Incorporated (city): March 31, 1883

Government
  - Mayor: James Boyd

Area
  - Total: 12.78 sq mi (33.09 km^{2})
  - Land: 11.96 sq mi (30.97 km^{2})
  - Water: 0.82 sq mi (2.12 km^{2})
- Elevation: 600 ft (183 m)

Population (2020)
  - Total: 25,410
  - Density: 2,088.4/sq mi (806.35/km^{2})
- Time zone: UTC-6 (Central)
  - Summer (DST): UTC-5 (CDT)
- ZIP code: 54115
- Area code: 920
- FIPS code: 55-19775
- GNIS feature ID: 1563754
- Website: https://www.deperewi.gov/

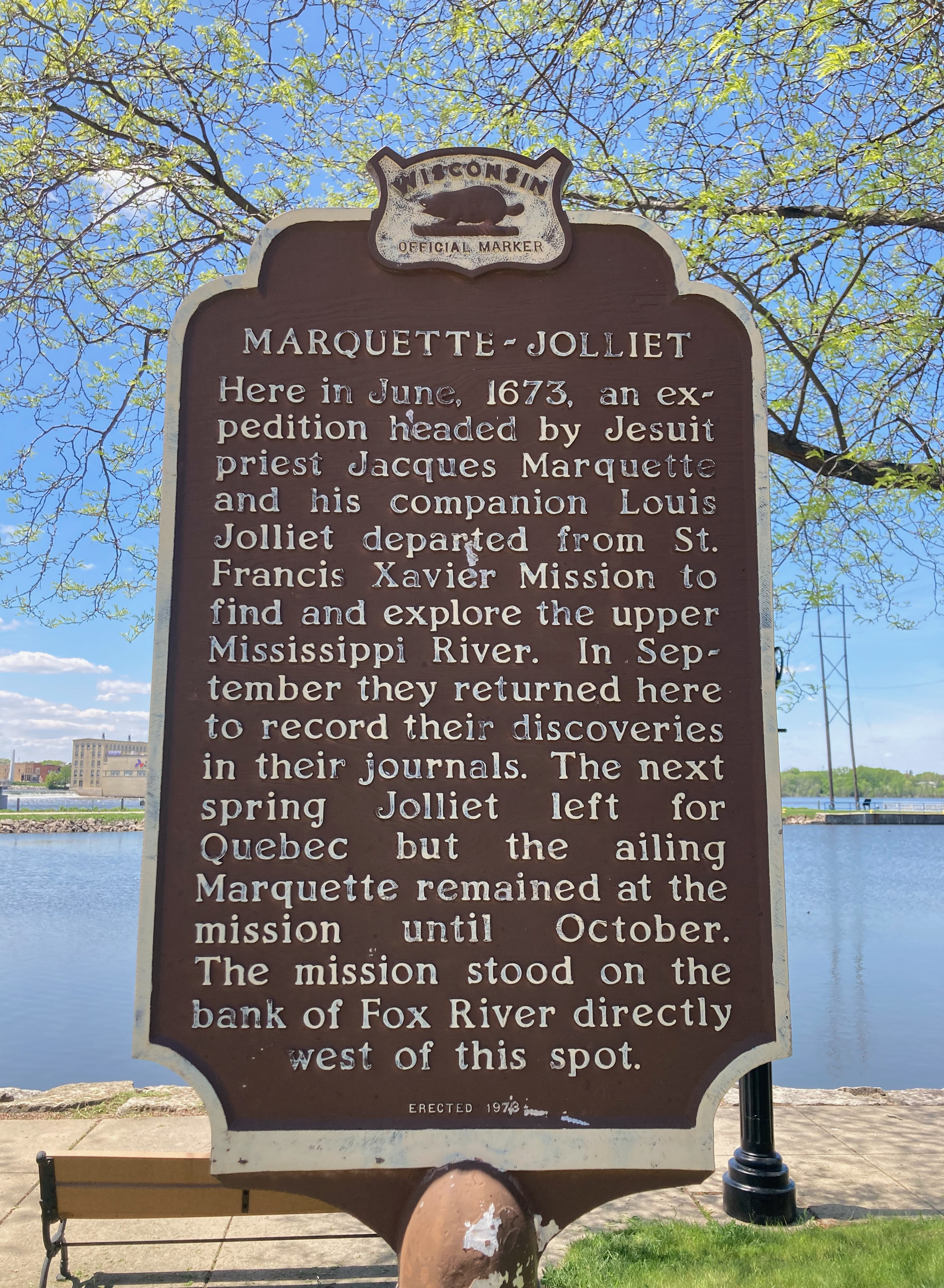
Wisconsin Historical Society Marker 189: Marquette-Joliet. Located on Front St in east De Pere.

De Pere (/dɪˈpɪər/ di-PEER) is a city in Brown County, Wisconsin, United States. It is a suburb of Green Bay and is part of the Green Bay metropolitan area, and its population was 25,410 at the 2020 census.

What is now De Pere is located on the ancestral homeland of the Menominee people. By the 17th century, the site was home to a multi-tribal settlement of several thousand people. It became a center of European missionary activity, and growth after colonization was driven by paper production.

== History ==
When the first European, Jean Nicolet, visited the place in 1634–35, De Pere was the site of a polyglot settlement of several thousand attracted by the fishing at the first rapids of the Fox River. In 1671, French Jesuit explorer Père Claude-Jean Allouez founded the Saint Francis Xavier Mission at the last set of rapids on the Fox River before it enters The Bay of Green Bay. The site was known as Rapides Des Pères (rapids of the fathers) which became modern day De Pere.

The present city of De Pere had its beginnings in 1836, when John Penn Arndt and Charles Tullar incorporated the De Pere Hydraulic Company and drew up the first plat of the town. In 1837, a popular vote established De Pere as the county seat of Brown County; it maintained this status until 1854, when another election moved the county seat to Green Bay.

Politically, under the first township plan for Brown County, the area that is now the city of De Pere fell on the boundary between the town of Howard (which comprised much of the area west of the Fox River) and the town of "Mason", which comprised roughly the southern half of the county. In 1838, the area was first formally established by the territorial government as a separate township entity. At that time it was named the town of "Wilcox", for Randall Wilcox, who was then president of the De Pere Hydraulic Company, and it comprised most of the area of the current city of De Pere as well as the area that is now the town of Ledgeview, Wisconsin.

In 1839, the town of Wilcox was divided along the Fox River, with the eastern half becoming the town of De Pere (Ledgeview); the area west of the river was re-integrated into the town of Howard. The village of De Pere was incorporated within the town of De Pere by an act of the state legislature on March 6, 1857. West De Pere, on the west side of the river, was eventually set off from Howard as a separate town, and in 1870, the village of West De Pere was incorporated.

The west–east division at the river persisted until 1890. In 1883, the village of De Pere was re-incorporated as the city of De Pere, that same year the village of West De Pere was re-incorporated as the city of Nicolet (after voyageur Jean Nicolet). In 1887 the city of Nicolet was renamed the city of West De Pere, and in 1890 the city of West De Pere was finally consolidated into the city of De Pere to form a single city government.

St. Norbert College, which abuts the banks of the Fox River on the city's west side near the Claude Allouez Bridge, was founded by Norbertine Abbot Pennings in 1898.

The De Pere Dam marks a significant point on the Lower Fox River; during the 20th century, the area just downstream of the dam contained the highest PCB concentrations in the river—up to 3,000 parts per million—from paper mill discharges between the 1950s and 1970s. A billion-dollar cleanup completed in 2020 dredged or capped over 6 million cubic yards of contaminated sediment.

=== Registered historic places ===
De Pere has several areas on the National Register of Historic Places. North Broadway Street Historic District is listed as #83003368. Large homes line Broadway, Ridgeway Blvd., Morris, Fulton, Franklin, Cass, Front, and Wisconsin Streets near the Fox River.

The De Pere Lock and Dam Historic District (#93001331) was added in 1993.

The Union Hotel was added to the list in 2003.

The Randall Avenue Historic District and North Michigan Street-North Superior Street Historic District were added in 2007.

The Edwin and Jennie Gutknecht House was listed in 2015.

The St. Norbert College Historic District was added to the list in 2018.

The Mansion Street World War II Defense Housing Historic District and the Daviswood Ranch Homes Historic District were added to the list in 2021.

== Geography ==
De Pere is located at 44°26′46″N 88°4′27″W (44.4460910, −88.0740510).

According to the United States Census Bureau, the city has an area of 12.30 square miles (31.86 km^{2}), of which 11.58 square miles (29.99 km^{2}) is land and 0.72 square miles (1.86 km^{2}) is water.

=== Climate ===
De Pere

Climate chart (precipitation, max. and min. temperature)
J	F	M	A	M	J	J	A	S	O	N	D
70 −8 −14	76 −7 −11	82 1 −5	132 15 1	116 20 6	127 24 13	104 28 16	104 26 17	83 22 11	125 14 5	76 6 −2	65 −7 −10
- █ Average max. and min. temperatures in °C
- █ Precipitation totals in mm
Imperial conversion
J	F	M	A	M	J	J	A	S	O	N	D
2.8 18 7	3 19 12	3.2 34 23	5.2 59 34	4.6 68 43	5 75 55	4.1 82 61	4.1 79 63	3.3 72 52	4.9 57 41	3 43 28	2.6 19 14
- █ Average max. and min. temperatures in °F
- █ Precipitation totals in inches

== Demographics ==
Historical population
Census	Pop.	Note	%±
1860	508		—
1870	1,372		170.1%
1880	1,954		42.4%
1890	3,625		85.5%
1900	4,038		11.4%
1910	4,477		10.9%
1920	5,165		15.4%
1930	5,521		6.9%
1940	6,373		15.4%
1950	8,146		27.8%
1960	10,045		23.3%
1970	13,309		32.5%
1980	14,892		11.9%
1990	16,569		11.3%
2000	20,559		24.1%
2010	23,800		15.8%
2020	25,410		6.8%
U.S. Decennial Census

=== 2020 census ===
As of the 2020 census, De Pere had a population of 25,410, and the population density was 2,125.3 inhabitants per square mile (820.6/km^{2}). The median age was 35.8 years. 22.1% of residents were under the age of 18 and 15.2% were 65 years of age or older. For every 100 females there were 92.5 males, and for every 100 females age 18 and over there were 89.3 males age 18 and over.

99.7% of residents lived in urban areas, while 0.3% lived in rural areas.

There were 9,972 households, of which 30.4% had children under the age of 18 living in them. Of all households, 48.1% were married-couple households, 16.7% were households with a male householder and no spouse or partner present, and 26.9% were households with a female householder and no spouse or partner present. About 30.0% of all households were made up of individuals and 12.7% had someone living alone who was 65 years of age or older.

There were 10,305 housing units at an average density of 861.9 per square mile (332.8/km^{2}), of which 3.2% were vacant. The homeowner vacancy rate was 0.7% and the rental vacancy rate was 3.4%.

Racial composition as of the 2020 census
Race	Number	Percent
White	22,343	87.9%
Black or African American	471	1.9%
American Indian and Alaska Native	334	1.3%
Asian	545	2.1%
Native Hawaiian and Other Pacific Islander	31	0.1%
Some other race	357	1.4%
Two or more races	1,329	5.2%
Hispanic or Latino (of any race)	1,067	4.2%

=== 2010 census ===
As of the census of 2010, there were 23,800 people, 9,254 households, and 5,869 families living in the city. The population density was 2,055.3 inhabitants per square mile (793.6/km^{2}). There were 9,742 housing units at an average density of 841.3 per square mile (324.8/km^{2}). The racial makeup of the city was 94.0% White, 0.9% African American, 1.2% Native American, 1.5% Asian, 0.7% from other races, and 1.8% from two or more races. Hispanic or Latino people of any race were 2.1% of the population.

There were 9,254 households, of which 33.2% had children under the age of 18 living with them, 49.4% were married couples living together, 9.9% had a female householder with no husband present, 4.1% had a male householder with no wife present, and 36.6% were non-families. 29.2% of all households were made up of individuals, and 10.8% had someone living alone who was 65 years of age or older. The average household size was 2.39 and the average family size was 2.97.

The median age in the city was 33.7 years. 23.8% of residents were under the age of 18; 14.1% were between the ages of 18 and 24; 26.4% were from 25 to 44; 23.9% were from 45 to 64; and 11.7% were 65 years of age or older. The gender makeup of the city was 47.9% male and 52.1% female.

=== 2000 census ===
As of the census of 2000, there were 20,559 people, 7,724 households, and 5,020 families living in the city. The population density was 1,938.4 people per square mile (748.2/km^{2}). There were 7,993 housing units at an average density of 753.6 per square mile (290.9/km^{2}). The racial makeup of the city was 96.71% White, 0.54% African American, 0.92% Native American, 0.75% Asian, 0.03% Pacific Islander, 0.19% from other races, and 0.86% from two or more races. Hispanic or Latino people of any race were 0.98% of the population.

There were 7,724 households, out of which 33.9% had children under the age of 18 living with them, 54.2% were married couples living together, 7.7% had a female householder with no husband present, and 35.0% were non-families. 27.6% of all households were made up of individuals, and 10.5% had someone living alone who was 65 years of age or older. The average household size was 2.46 and the average family size was 3.04.

In the city, the population was spread out, with 24.5% under the age of 18, 14.8% from 18 to 24, 30.8% from 25 to 44, 18.5% from 45 to 64, and 11.4% who were 65 years of age or older. The median age was 32 years. For every 100 females, there were 93.6 males. For every 100 females age 18 and over, there were 89.6 males.

The median income for a household in the city was $50,282, and the median income for a family was $61,688. Males had a median income of $39,710 versus $27,166 for females. The per capita income for the city was $24,013. About 2.3% of families and 4.0% of the population were below the poverty line, including 3.2% of those under the age of 18 and 5.4% of those 65 and older.

=== Religion ===
St. Mark Lutheran Church is a member of the Wisconsin Evangelical Lutheran Synod in De Pere.

The National Shrine of Saint Joseph is located at St. Norbert College.

St. Norbert Abbey is the mother canonry of the Premonstratensian Order in the United States.

== Government ==
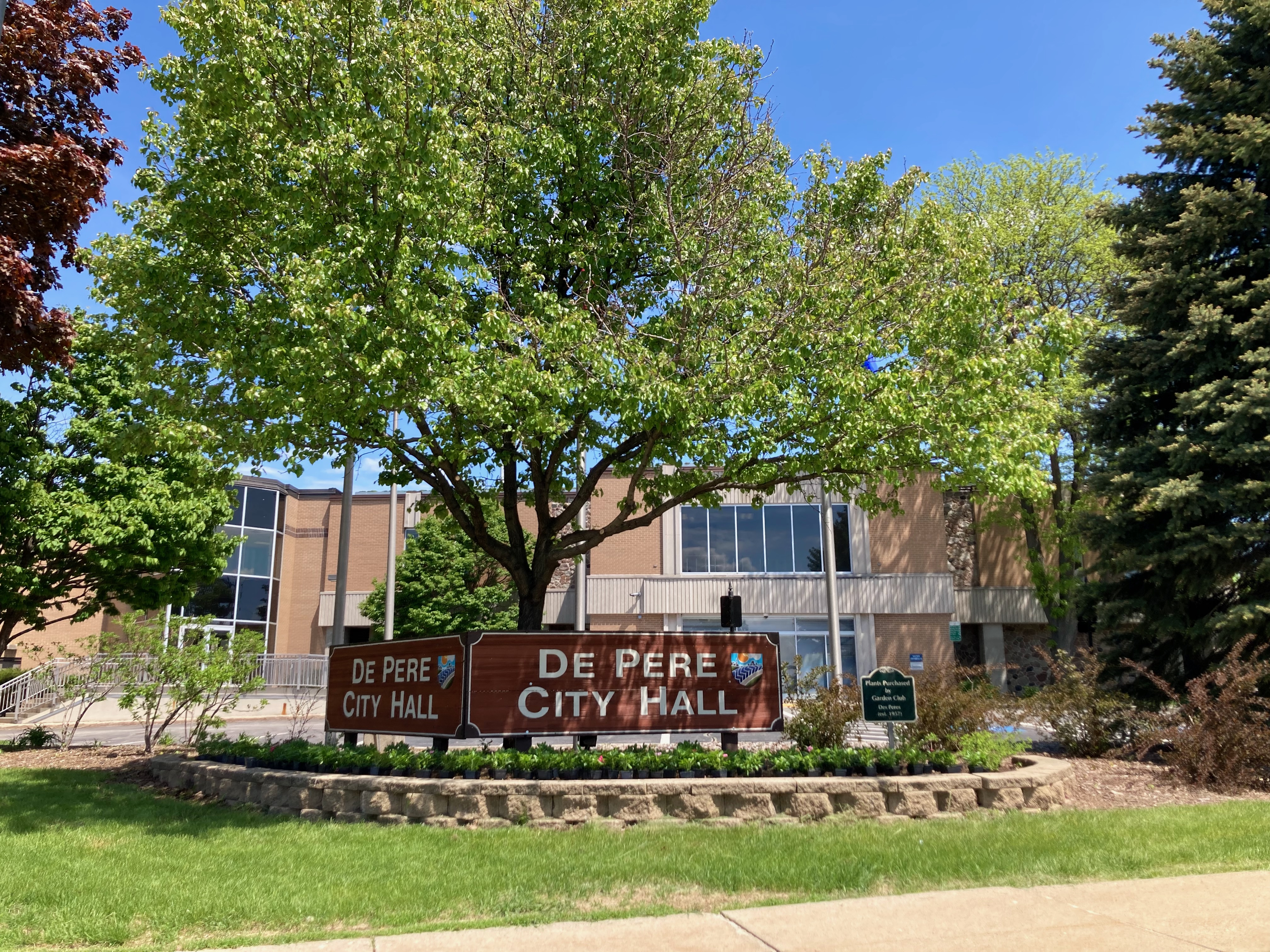
De Pere City Hall

De Pere is represented by Tony Wied in the United States House of Representatives, and by Ron Johnson and Tammy Baldwin in the United States Senate. Jamie Wall represents De Pere in the Wisconsin State Senate, while Benjamin Franklin represents De Pere in the Wisconsin State Assembly.

De Pere has a mayor-council form of government with a full-time city administrator. The mayor is elected. The city council consists of eight alderpersons, two elected from each of four districts. All elected officials serve two-year terms.

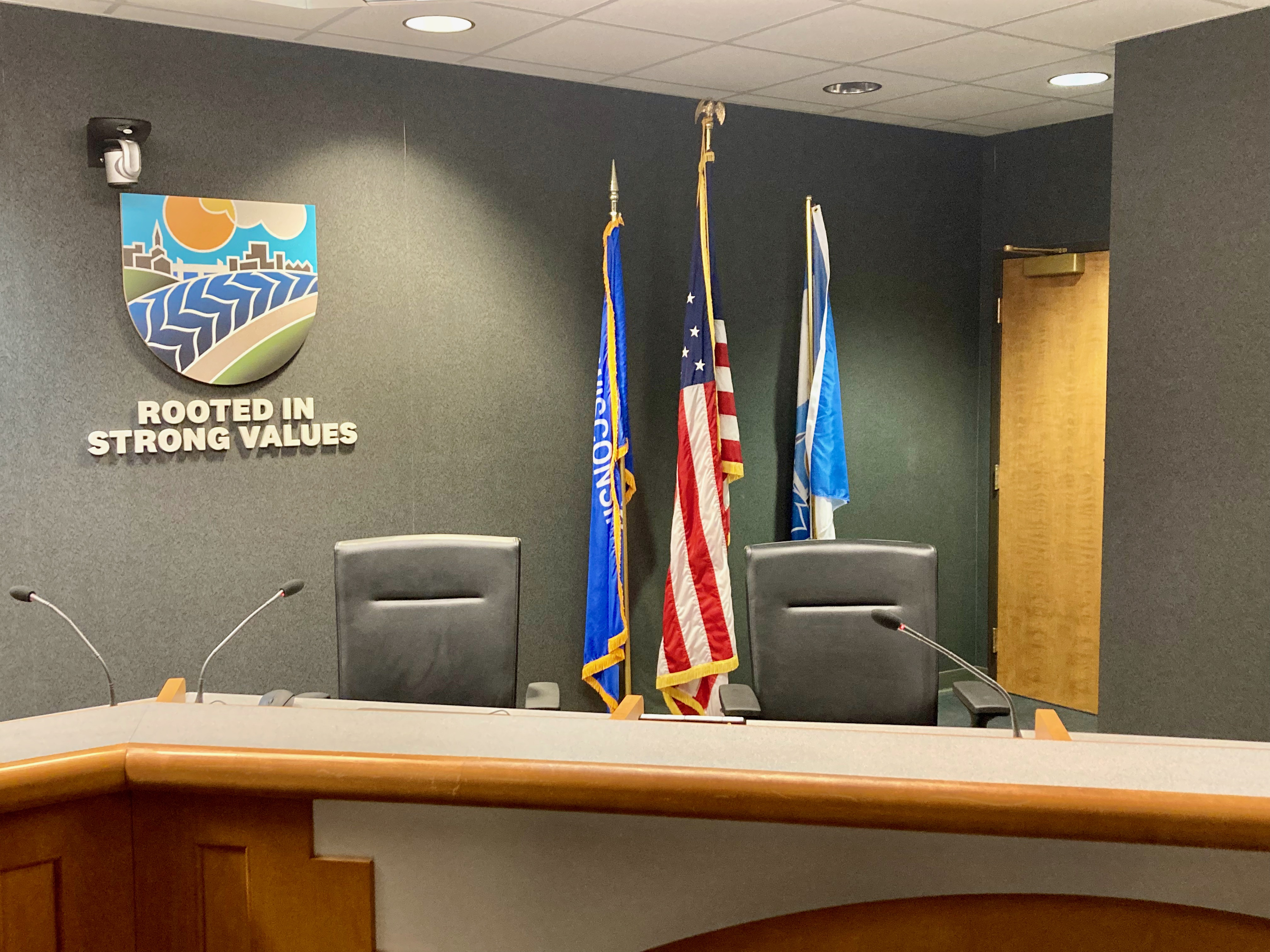
De Pere City Council chambers

== Education ==
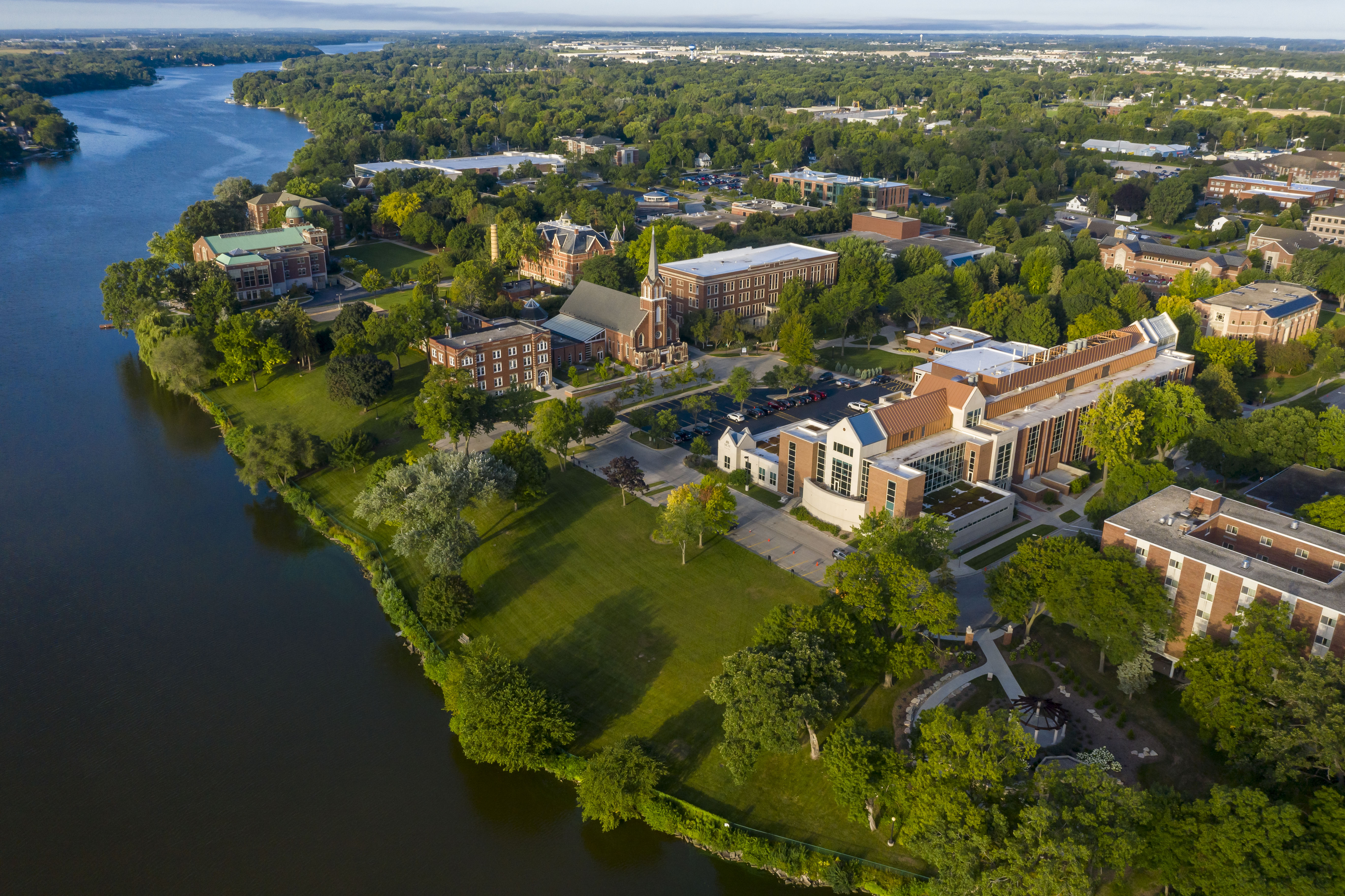
Aerial view of St. Norbert College

De Pere is served by two school districts.

The Unified School District of De Pere has the following schools:

- De Pere High School
- De Pere Middle School
- Foxview Intermediate School
- Dickinson Elementary School
- Heritage Elementary School
- Altmayer Elementary School

The School District of West De Pere has the following schools:

- West De Pere High School
- West De Pere Middle School
- West De Pere Intermediate School
- Westwood Elementary School
- Hemlock Creek Elementary School
- Phantom Knight Charter School

De Pere Private Schools:

- Notre Dame of De Pere
- Our Lady of Lourdes

De Pere is also home to St. Norbert College, a private Roman Catholic liberal arts college.

Syble Hopp is a school for children ages 3–21 years old who have cognitive and other developmental disabilities. It is operated by the Brown County Children with Disabilities Education Board.

== Transportation ==
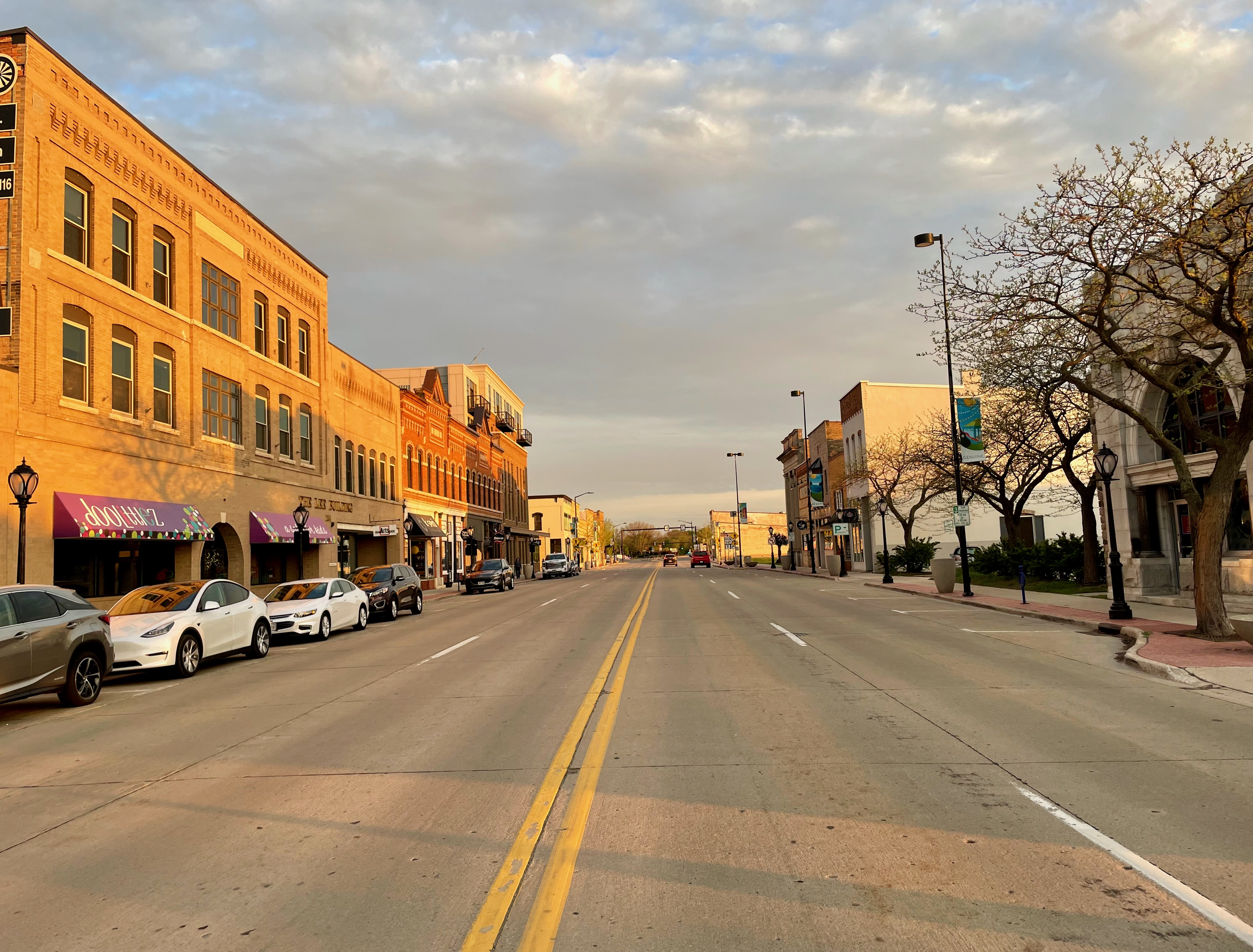
Broadway St, looking south

Interstate 41 travels north–south on the west side of De Pere. Wisconsin Highway 32/Wisconsin Highway 57 enter De Pere from the south and split in the middle of De Pere. WIS 32 heads east–west through De Pere before turning north. WIS 57 continues straight north. There is limited transit service operated by Green Bay Metro, and the CN provides freight railroad service. The Fox River is navigable for boat and canoe traffic, with the exception of a dam.

== Notable people ==
- Arthur J. Altmeyer, Commissioner of Social Security
- Jason Berken, MLB player
- Wilson Charles, athlete
- Chris Henry Coffey, actor
- Robert John Cornell, Roman Catholic priest, former member of the United States House of Representatives
- Oliver Daniel, arts administrator, musicologist, and composer
- Charles W. Day, Wisconsin state senator
- Gary T. Dilweg, Wisconsin state representative
- M. H. Fisk, first mayor of De Pere
- Burley Follett, former mayor of Green Bay, Wisconsin
- Ben Franklin, Wisconsin state representative
- Paul Gigot, political commentator
- Earl Gilson, Wisconsin state representative
- Charles Hall, Wisconsin state representative
- Robert J. Havighurst, physicist
- Charlie Hill, comedian
- James F. Hughes, U.S. representative
- Henry J. Janssen, Wisconsin state representative
- Stephen King, author
- Joseph Konopka, incarcerated terrorist known as "Dr. Chaos"
- Scott McCurley, NFL assistant coach
- Robert J. McGeehan, Wisconsin state senator
- Terry Anne Meeuwsen, Miss America 1973, Miss Wisconsin 1972, co-host of The 700 Club
- George F. Merrill, Wisconsin state senator
- Enos Warren Persons, Wisconsin state senator
- John Schneider, NFL executive
- John L. Schnitzler, Wisconsin state representative
- Edward A. Seymour, Wisconsin state representative
- Alexander H. Smith, mycologist
- Gale Staley, MLB player
- William J. Sweeney, Wisconsin state representative
- Tony Wied, member of the U.S. House of Representatives
- Randall Wilcox, first village president of De Pere
