= John Ringle =

American politician (1848–1923)

10th & 27th Mayor of Wausau, Wisconsin
- In office April 1912 – April 1916
- Preceded by: John F. Lamont
- Succeeded by: Herman E. Marquardt
- In office April 1884 – April 1885
- Preceded by: Daniel L. Plumer
- Succeeded by: Rufus P. Manson

Member of the Wisconsin Senate from the 21st district
- In office January 1, 1883 – January 3, 1887
- Preceded by: Charles F. Crosby
- Succeeded by: John E. Leahy

Member of the Wisconsin State Assembly
- In office January 2, 1893 – January 7, 1895
- Preceded by: Neal Brown
- Succeeded by: George Werheim
- Constituency: Marathon 2nd district
- In office January 6, 1879 – January 2, 1882
- Preceded by: F. W. Kickbusch
- Succeeded by: John C. Clarke
- Constituency: Marathon County district

Personal details
- Born: Johann Ringle; October 2, 1848 Herman, Dodge County, Wisconsin, U.S.
- Died: March 15, 1923 (aged 74) Wausau, Wisconsin, U.S.
- Resting place: Pine Grove Cemetery, Wausau
- Party: Democratic
- Spouses: Auguste Engel (m. 1872; died 1894); Louise Kemmer (m. 1895; died 1909); Augusta Thielke (m. 1909–1923)
- Children: Gustave Charles Ringle^{(b. 1873; died 1947)}; Edward Bartholomew Ringle^{(b. 1874; died 1957)}; Anna Louisa Matilda (Thielke)^{(b. 1876; died 1969)}; Oscar Johan Ludwig Ringle^{(b. 1878; died 1945)}; Beatrice Caroline Louise Ringle^{(b. 1880; died 1956)}; John Louis Ringle Jr.^{(b. 1884; died 1942)}; Lenore L. Ringle^{(b. 1886; died 1969)}; Leander Louis Ringle^{(b. 1886; died 1985)}; Valeria R. (Flemming)^{(b. 1892; died 1984)}
- Parents: Bartholomew Ringle (father); Magdalena Amalia (Pick) Ringle (mother)

John Ringle (born Johann Ringle; October 2, 1848 – March 15, 1923) was an American businessman and Democratic politician from Wausau, Wisconsin. He was the 10th and 27th mayor of Wausau, and represented Marathon County for five years in the Wisconsin State Assembly and for four years in the Wisconsin Senate.

His father, Bartholomew Ringle, was an early settler at Wausau and served as mayor, state representative, and several other county offices. John Ringle's son, Oscar Ringle, also served in the Assembly.

== Biography ==
Ringle was born on October 2, 1848, in Herman, Dodge County, Wisconsin. His father, Bartholomew Ringle, had served in the Wisconsin legislature; and his son, Oscar Ringle, would later do so.

== Career ==
Ringle served in the Wisconsin State Assembly in 1879 and from 1894 to 1898. He also served in the Wisconsin Senate from 1882 to 1886. From 1873 to 1878, he was Clerk of Marathon County, Wisconsin. Ringle served as mayor of Wausau in 1884 and 1912. He also served on the Wausau Common Council and the Marathon County, Wisconsin Board of Supervisors. President Grover Cleveland appointed Ringle postmaster of Wausau. Additionally, Ringle was a candidate for State Treasurer of Wisconsin in 1877, losing to Richard W. Guenther, and for the United States House of Representatives from Wisconsin's 9th congressional district in 1886, losing to incumbent Isaac Stephenson. He was a Democrat. Ringle owned a sawmill and the Ringle Brick Company. He was also in the real estate business and in the banking business. He died at his home on March 15, 1923, in Wausau, Wisconsin.

== See also ==
- List of mayors of Wausau, Wisconsin

Party political offices
Preceded by George T. Heslin	Democratic nominee for Treasurer of Wisconsin; 1910	Succeeded by Nicholas Schmidt
Wisconsin State Assembly
Preceded by F. W. Kickbusch	Member of the Wisconsin State Assembly from the Marathon County district January 6, 1879 – January 2, 1882	Succeeded by John C. Clarke
Preceded by Neal Brown	Member of the Wisconsin State Assembly from the Marathon 2nd district January 2, 1893 – January 7, 1895	Succeeded by George Werheim
Wisconsin Senate
Preceded by Charles F. Crosby	Member of the Wisconsin Senate from the 21st district January 1, 1883 – January 3, 1887	Succeeded by John E. Leahy
Political offices
Preceded by Daniel L. Plumer	Mayor of Wausau, Wisconsin; April 1884 – April 1885	Succeeded by Rufus P. Manson
Preceded by John F. Lamont	Mayor of Wausau, Wisconsin; April 1912 – April 1916	Succeeded by Herman E. Marquardt
