= Bartholomew Ringle =

American politician (1814–1881)

Member of the Wisconsin State Assembly from the Marathon County district
- In office January 4, 1875 – January 7, 1878
- Preceded by: Willis C. Silverthorn
- Succeeded by: F. W. Kickbusch
- In office January 1, 1872 – January 6, 1873
- Preceded by: Rufus P. Manson (Marathon & Wood)
- Succeeded by: Daniel L. Plumer

Member of the Wisconsin State Assembly from the Marathon–Wood district
- In office January 4, 1864 – January 2, 1865
- Preceded by: Levi P. Powers
- Succeeded by: H. W. Remington

Clerk of Marathon County, Wisconsin
- In office January 1865 – January 1871
- Preceded by: Rufus P. Manson
- Succeeded by: Jacob Paff

Judge of Marathon County, Wisconsin
- In office January 1864 – October 27, 1881
- Preceded by: C. Graham
- Succeeded by: Louis Marchetti

5th Mayor of Wausau, Wisconsin
- In office April 1876 – April 1877
- Preceded by: Charles Hoeflinger
- Succeeded by: John C. Clarke

2nd Village President of Wausau, Wisconsin
- In office April 1862 – April 1864
- Preceded by: F. A. Hoffman
- Succeeded by: Rufus P. Manson

Personal details
- Born: Johann Bartholomaus Ringle; October 16, 1814 Zweibrücken, Palatinate, Kingdom of Bavaria
- Died: October 27, 1881 (aged 67) Wausau, Wisconsin, U.S.
- Resting place: Pine Grove Cemetery, Wausau
- Party: Democratic
- Spouse: Magdalena Amalia Pick (m. 1834–1881)
- Children: Carl Ringle^{(b. 1835; died 1908)}; Bartholomew Ludwig Ringle^{(b. 1839; died 1914)}; Phillip Ringle^{(b. 1843; died 1891)}; Valentine Ringle^{(b. 1847; died 1895)}; John Ringle^{(b. 1848; died 1923)}; Caroline (Lodde)^{(b. 1855; died 1950)}; Louisa (Merklein)^{(b. 1857; died 1948)}
- Relatives: Oscar Ringle (grandson)
- Profession: Lawyer

Bartholomew Ringle (born Johann Bartholomaus Ringle; October 16, 1814 – October 27, 1881) was a German American immigrant, lawyer, and Wisconsin pioneer. He was instrumental in organizing many of the towns of Marathon County, Wisconsin. He was the fifth mayor of Wausau, Wisconsin, represented Marathon County for five terms in the Wisconsin State Assembly, and served nearly 18 years as county judge. His son and grandson also served in the Wisconsin Legislature.

== Biography ==
Ringle was born on October 16, 1814, in the region of Zweibrücken in what is today southwest Germany. At the time of his birth, this was part of the Rhine region which had just been transferred to the dominion of the Kingdom of Bavaria, after having been briefly under the rule of Napoleon's French Empire. (Note: His biographies always describe his home region as "Rhein-Bairen", which is likely a poor Anglicization of "Rhine-Bayern" or "Bavarian Rhine".) As a resident of Bavaria, he received a common school education and became an attorney.

He emigrated to the United States in 1846, coming directly to the Wisconsin Territory and settling in Germantown, in Washington County. He lived there for two years before moving to the town of Herman, in Dodge County. In Herman, Ringle became a prominent member of the community and a member of the Democratic Party of Wisconsin. He was appointed to serve as postmaster for six years, and was elected justice of the peace, town clerk, and chairman of the town board.

He moved to Wausau, Wisconsin, in Marathon County in 1859. Wausau was incorporated as a village in 1861; Ringle was elected the 2nd village president in 1862 and was re-elected in 1863. In 1863, he was also elected to the Wisconsin State Assembly, running on the Democratic Party ticket. He represented all of Marathon and Wood counties. In the 1863 election, he was also elected county judge, and would continue to hold that office until his death. In 1864, he was also elected to serve as county clerk—that office he held for three two-year terms.

He did not run for re-election to the Assembly in 1864, but returned to the Assembly with the election of 1871, and then served three more terms in 1875, 1876, and 1877. While serving in the Assembly, he was instrumental in the act to incorporate Wausau as a city. He was elected the fifth mayor of Wausau in 1876.

Ringle continued to work as an attorney and county judge until his death. He died of heart disease while working at his desk in Wausau, on October 27, 1881. He was buried at Wausau's Pine Grove Cemetery. Reports stated that Wausau "never saw a larger funeral."

== Personal life and family ==
Bartholomew Ringle married Magdalena Amalia Pick in June 1834, while they were both living in the Kingdom of Bavaria. They had twelve children together, though two died in infancy, and two others died in childhood. Several of their children grew to prominence in Wisconsin.

Charles (Carl) Ringle was a successful merchant in Herman, Dodge County, Wisconsin, and served as town chairman, town treasurer, town clerk, postmaster, and justice of the peace.

Valentine Ringle served as a member of the city council in Wausau and city treasurer and postmaster. He was also a publisher of two newspapers, the English-language Wisconsin River Pilot and the German-language Wausau Wochenblatt.

John Ringle was a successful merchant in Wausau and also served as postmaster there. He served three terms as county clerk, three terms as a member of the State Assembly, and two years in the State Senate. His son, Oscar Ringle, also served in the State Assembly.

== Electoral history ==
=== Wisconsin Assembly (1871) ===
Wisconsin Assembly, Marathon County District Election, 1871
Party	Candidate	Votes	%	±%
General Election, November 7, 1871
Democratic	Bartholomew Ringle	650	65.72%	
Independent Democratic	Charles Hoeflinger	339	34.28%	
Plurality		311	31.45%	
Total votes		989	100.0%	
Democratic win (new seat)				

=== Wisconsin Assembly (1874, 1875, 1876) ===
Wisconsin Assembly, Marathon County District Election, 1874
Party	Candidate	Votes	%	±%
General Election, November 3, 1874
Democratic	Bartholomew Ringle	1,647	100.0%	
Total votes		1,647	100.0%	+55.82%
Democratic hold				

Wisconsin Assembly, Marathon County District Election, 1875
Party	Candidate	Votes	%	±%
General Election, November 2, 1875
Democratic	Bartholomew Ringle (incumbent)	1,296	100.0%	
Total votes		1,296	100.0%	-21.31%
Democratic hold				

Wisconsin Assembly, Marathon County District Election, 1876
Party	Candidate	Votes	%	±%
General Election, November 7, 1876
Democratic	Bartholomew Ringle (incumbent)	1,787	72.49%	
Republican	C. A. Single	678	27.51%	
Plurality		1,109	44.99%	
Total votes		2,465	100.0%	+90.20%
Democratic hold				

== See also ==
- List of mayors of Wausau, Wisconsin

== Notes ==
Wisconsin State Assembly
Preceded by Levi P. Powers	Member of the Wisconsin State Assembly from the Marathon–Wood district January 4, 1864 – January 2, 1865	Succeeded by H. W. Remington
Preceded by Rufus P. Manson (Marathon & Wood)	Member of the Wisconsin State Assembly from the Marathon County district January 1, 1872 – January 6, 1873	Succeeded by Daniel L. Plumer
Preceded by Willis C. Silverthorn	Member of the Wisconsin State Assembly from the Marathon County district January 4, 1875 – January 7, 1878	Succeeded by F. W. Kickbusch
Political offices
Preceded by F. A. Hoffman	Village President of Wausau, Wisconsin; April 1862 – April 1864	Succeeded by Rufus P. Manson
Preceded by Rufus P. Manson	Clerk of Marathon County, Wisconsin; January 1865 – January 1871	Succeeded by Jacob Paff
Preceded by Charles Hoeflinger	Mayor of Wausau, Wisconsin; April 1876 – April 1877	Succeeded by John C. Clarke
Legal offices
Preceded by C. Graham	Judge of Marathon County, Wisconsin; January 1864 – October 27, 1881	Succeeded by Louis Marchetti
