= Ringle (surname) =

Ringle is a surname. Notable people with the surname include:

- Bartholomew Ringle (1814–1881), American politician
- Christian M. Ringle, professor of management
- John Ringle (1848-1923), American businessman and politician
- Oscar Ringle (1878-1945), American politician and lawyer
