= List of mayors of Wausau, Wisconsin =

The following is a list of mayors of the city of Wausau, Wisconsin, USA.

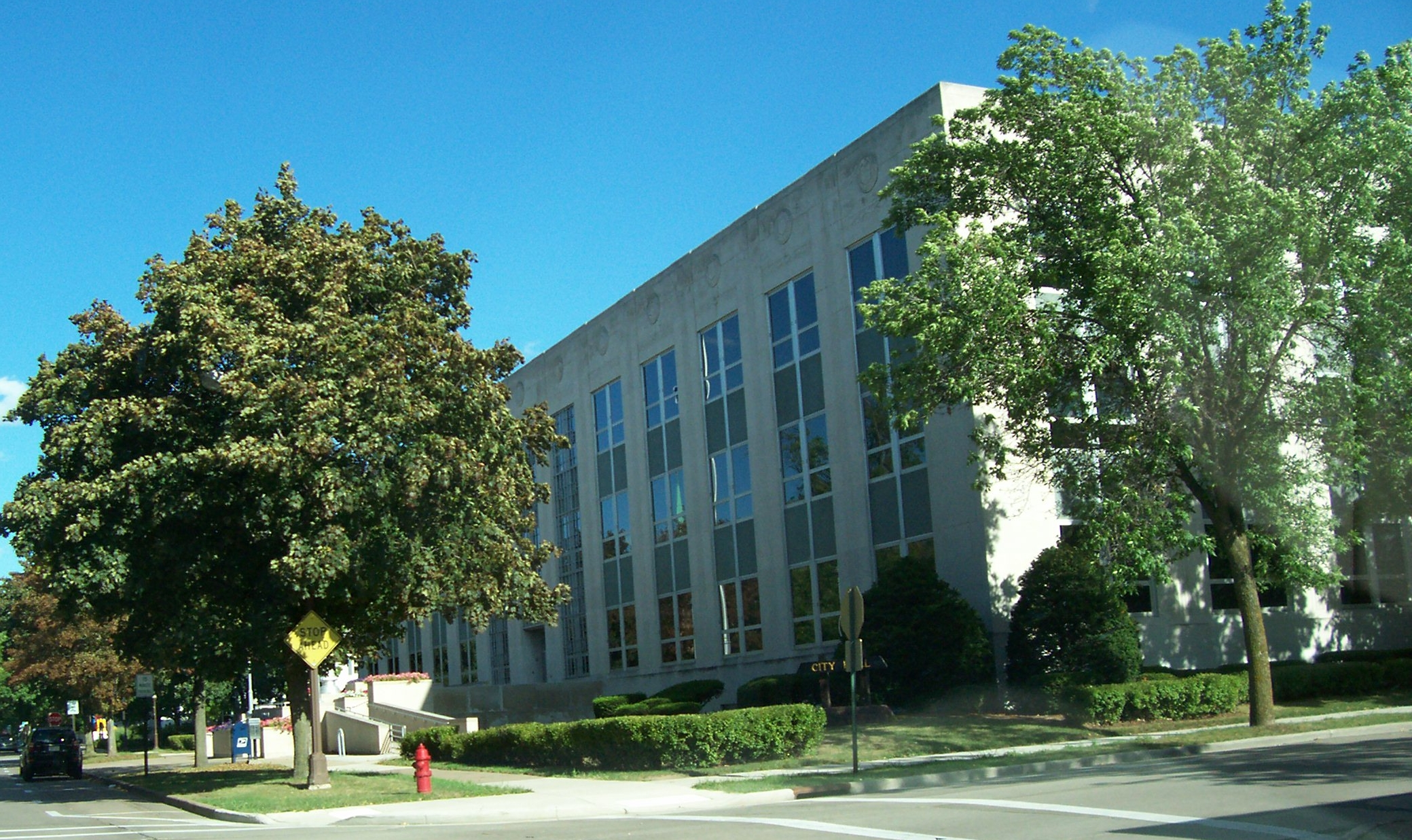
Wausau city hall building in 2007

- August Kickbusch, 1872–1873, 1874-1875
- Jacob Paff, 1873-1874
- Charles Hoeflinger, 1875-1876
- Bartholomew Ringle, 1876-1877
- John C. Clarke, 1877-1878
- Daniel L. Plumer, 1878–1879, 1882-1884
- John E. Leahy, 1879-1882
- John Ringle, 1884–1885, 1912-1916
- Rufus P. Manson, 1885-1887
- Anton Mehl, 1887-1888
- Ernst C. Zimmerman, 1888–1890, 1904-1906
- Gustave Mueller, 1890-1891
- Robert E. Parcher, 1891-1894
- John Miller, 1894-1895
- Henry E. McEachron, 1895–1896, 1897-1898
- Emery J. Anderson, 1896-1897
- John N. Manson, 1898-1899
- Joseph Reiser, 1899-1900
- Victor Alderson, 1900-1902
- Louis Marchetti, 1901-1904
- Myron H. Duncan, 1906-1908
- John F. Lamont, 1908-1912
- Herman E. Marquardt, 1916-1918
- John L. Sell, 1918-1920
- Emil Flatter, 1920-1926
- Otto Muenchow, 1926–1928, 1930-1935
- Alfred V. Gearhart, 1928-1930
- George Borowicz, 1935-1938
- August Polster, 1938-1942
- Herbert Giese, 1942-1954
- Arthur M. Smith, 1954-1958
- Ben Schuck, 1958-1964
- John Kannenberg, 1964-1988
- John H. Robinson, 1988-1992
- John Hess, 1992-1997
- Jim Schaefer, 1997-1998
- Linda E. Lawrence, 1998-2004
- James E. Tipple, 2004-2014
- Robert Mielke, 2014-2020
- Katie Rosenberg, 2020-2024
- Doug Diny, 2024–present

== See also ==
- Wausau history
