= Levi P. Powers =

19th century American politician

Member of the Wisconsin State Assembly from the Marathon–Wood district
- In office January 5, 1863 – January 4, 1864
- Preceded by: Charles Hoeflinger
- Succeeded by: Bartholomew Ringle

Personal details
- Born: May 9, 1828 Marshfield, Vermont
- Died: September 24, 1888 (aged 60) Wisconsin Rapids, Wisconsin
- Party: Democratic

Levi Parsons Powers (May 9, 1828 – September 24, 1888) was an American politician and lawyer.

Born in Marshfield, Vermont, Powers moved to Grand Rapids, Wisconsin in 1853, where he worked in logging and studied law. Powers was admitted to the Wisconsin Bar in 1853. Powers became the political editor of the Grand Rapids Tribune when it was established in 1873. He served as county clerk and as county judge. Powers served in the Wisconsin State Assembly in 1863. He died in Wisconsin Rapids, Wisconsin.
