= Waupaca =

Waupaca may refer to a city and a town in Waupaca County, Wisconsin:

- Waupaca, Wisconsin, a city
- Waupaca (town), Wisconsin, a town
