= Senator Leahy (disambiguation) =

Patrick Leahy (born 1940) is a U.S. Senator from Vermont since 1975. Senator Leahy may also refer to:

- Edward L. Leahy (1886–1953), U.S. Senator from Rhode Island from 1949 to 1950
- John E. Leahy (1842–1915), Wisconsin State Senate
