= Oscar Ringle =

20th century American politician

Member of the Wisconsin State Assembly from the Marathon 2nd district
- In office January 6, 1913 – January 4, 1915
- Preceded by: Arthur J. Plowman
- Succeeded by: Edward C. Kretlow

Personal details
- Born: Oscar Johan Ludwig Ringle; April 12, 1878 Wausau, Wisconsin, U.S.
- Died: November 4, 1945 (aged 67) Wausau, Wisconsin, U.S.
- Resting place: Pine Grove Cemetery, Wausau
- Party: Democratic
- Spouse: Clara Baesman (m. 1910–1945)
- Children: Dorothea Pauline Ringle^{(b. 1911; died 1978)}; Charles Lewis Ringle^{(b. 1916; died 1993)}; David A. Ringle^{(b. 1924; died 2012)}
- Parents: John Ringle (father); Augusta (Engle) Ringle (mother)
- Relatives: Bartholomew Ringle (grandfather)
- Education: University of Wisconsin–Madison; University of Wisconsin Law School
- Profession: Lawyer, politician

Oscar Louis Ringle (born Oscar Johan Ludwig Ringle; April 12, 1878 – November 4, 1945) was an American lawyer and Democratic politician from Wausau, Wisconsin. He served one term in the Wisconsin State Assembly, representing Marathon County during the 1913 term. Later he served as district attorney of Marathon County.

His father, John Ringle, and grandfather, Bartholomew Ringle, also served in the legislature.

== Biography ==
Born in Wausau, Wisconsin, Ringle received his bachelor's degree from the University of Wisconsin–Madison and his law degree from the University of Wisconsin Law School. He then practiced law in Wausau, Wisconsin. In 1913, Ringle served in the Wisconsin State Assembly as a member of the Democratic Party. Then in 1933 and 1934, Ringle was elected District Attorney of Marathon County, Wisconsin. Ringle was appointed postmaster of Wausau, Wisconsin in 1937. His grandfather, Bartholomew Ringle and father, John Ringle, had previously served in the Wisconsin legislature.

Wisconsin State Assembly
Preceded by Arthur J. Plowman	Member of the Wisconsin State Assembly from the Marathon 2nd district January 6, 1913 – January 4, 1915	Succeeded by Edward C. Kretlow
