= Grand Theater (Wausau, Wisconsin) =

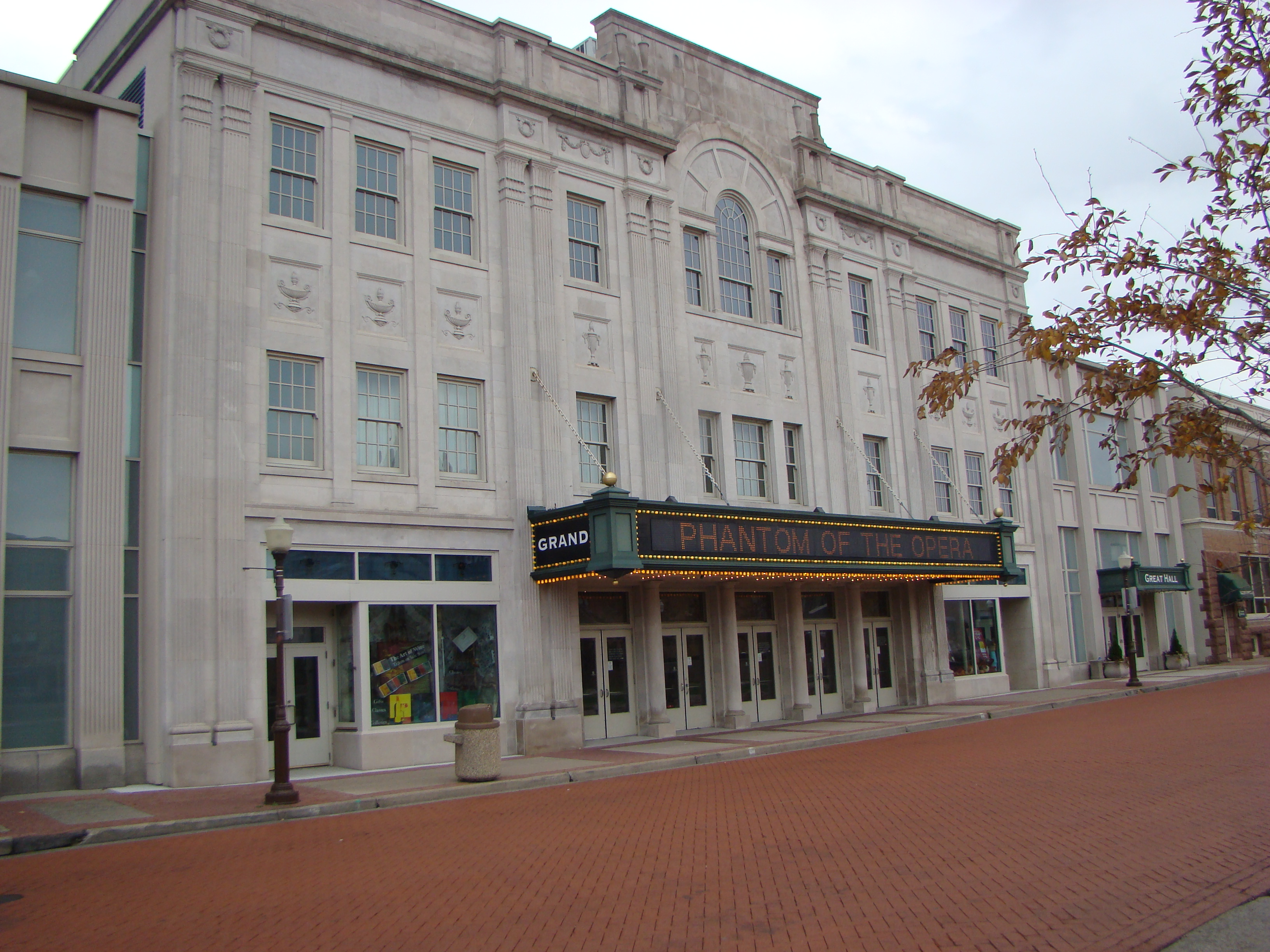
- The limestone exterior of the Grand Theater
- Interactive map of Grand Theater
- Address: 401 North 4th Street; Wausau, Wisconsin; United States
- Coordinates: 44.9599194°N 89.6280775°W
- Type: Performing arts center

Construction
- Opened: 1927

Website
- www.grandtheater.org

The Grand Theater is a historic theater and performing arts center in Wausau, Wisconsin, offering a variety of musical and artistic performances.

The Grand Theater traces its origins back to the Grand Opera House, which was originally built on the same location in 1899. The 890-seat opera house was a popular venue for musical and theatrical acts. The block where it stood has been considered an "arts block" ever since. When the opera house was demolished in the spring of 1927, construction began on the current Grand Theater, a movie palace built in the classic revival architectural style. Today, the Grand Theater stands as a regional performing arts center for the Wausau area, and the greater region of central Wisconsin.

In 1987, a $2.2 million project was undertaken to restore the theater back to its original glory. The technical systems were updated, allowing for the sound and lights required by touring shows. Since that time the Performing Arts Foundation has managed the Grand Theater and has brought a wide variety of entertainment acts to the stage.

In 2002 the community once again stepped up to expand the walls of the Grand Theater to become Artsblock. The $13.2 million project rededicated the facility to the glory of performance and energized not just the city of Wausau, but also the entire region.

The original Theatre Organ remains in the building, and is used for concerts, and to accompany silent films. The organ was built by the Kilgen Organ Company, and is one of only two Kilgen theatre organs to remain installed in its original theater.

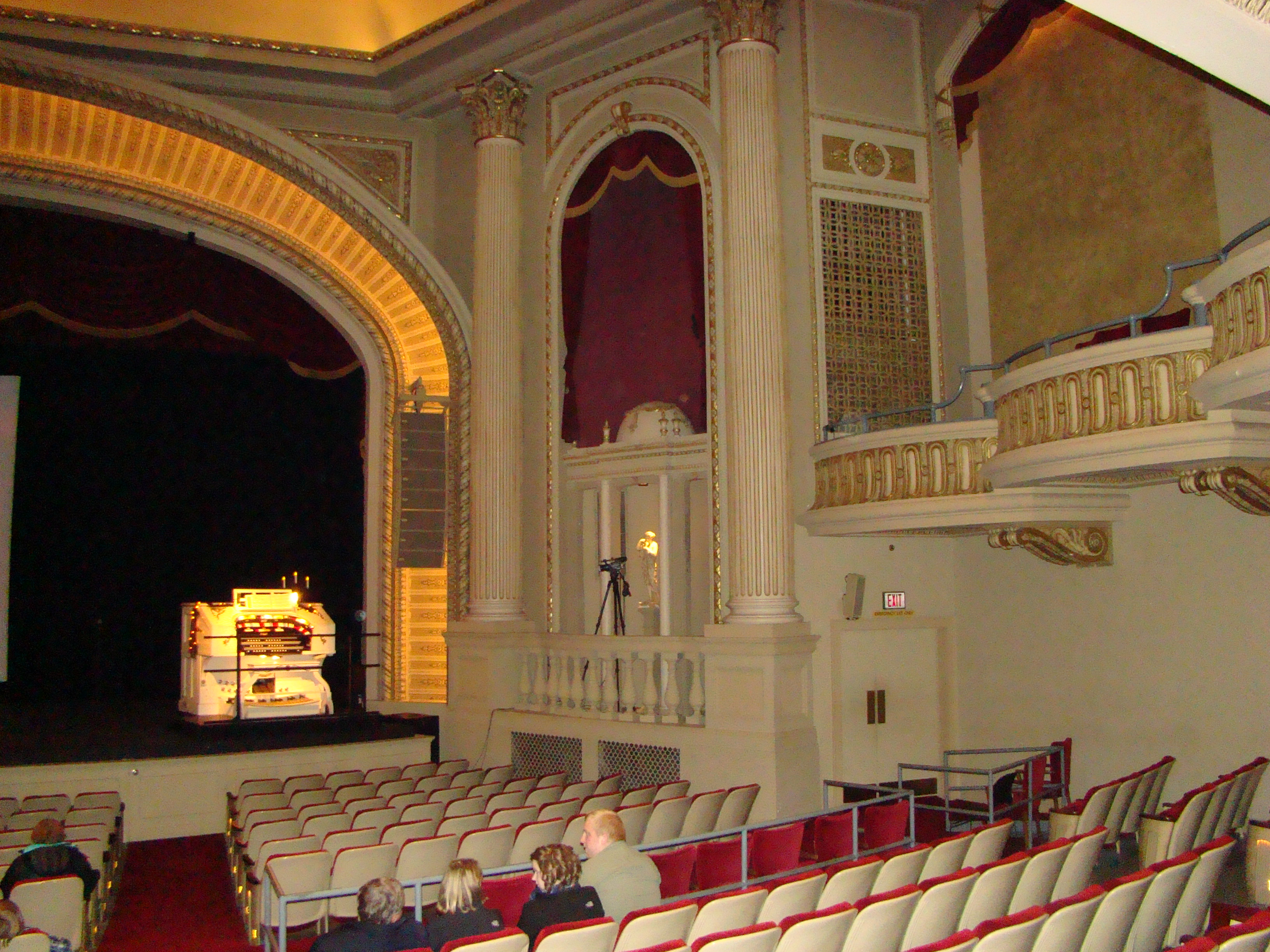
Inside the auditorium, with a view of the Organ console

Today, the Grand Theater is a regional destination for the performing arts, and maintains its opulent historic architecture. The theater contains classic examples of Colonnades, marble statues and the original solid Bedford limestone facade.
