= Wausau Pilot and Review =

Online news outlet based in Wisconsin

The Wausau Pilot and Review is an independent, online news outlet based in Wausau, Wisconsin, founded in 2017. It shares its name with a defunct local newspaper, of the same name, which was published from the 19th Century until 1940.

Its coverage focuses primarily on Marathon County, Wisconsin which has a population of about 150,000 people, and translates content into Spanish, Hmong and Vietnamese. It operates under the auspices of the "Wausau Pilot and Review Corporation," a non-profit corporation.

== History ==
=== Newspapers ===
The origins of the name "Wausau Pilot and Review" are in a handful of interrelated 19th-Century newspapers in Wausau, Wisconsin.

The Wisconsin River Pilot, established in 1865 by 18-year-old Valentine Ringle, of German descent (also founder of the German-language Wausau Wochenblatt 1876-1887), and reflected Ringle's Democratic political leaning.

The paper continued under Ringle until August 1884, when it was purchased by, and united with, the Wausau Review (founded in 1882 by Eugene Butler "E.B." Thayer), to become the Wisconsin River Pilot and Review. Under Thayer, the paper's political leaning was Democratic, and, according to Wisconsin historian Milo Milton Quaife, it became noted as "one of the best weeklies" in that section of Wisconsin, conducted in keeping with the "most modern and progressive" journalism ideas of the time. Quaife notes that Thayer's "widely read" paper promoted community development, and his editorials were "noted for... vigor and literary excellence."

The name was promptly shortened to Pilot and Review, under the leadership of E. B. Thayer, who also titled it Pilot-Review, From July 1896 (some say 1901), it was renamed as the Wausau Pilot (or, alternatively, Wausau Daily Pilot), continuing under that name until July 1920, when Thayer sold out to the Pilot Printing & Publishing Co., controlled by his son, E.B. Thayer, Jr.

During the "Prohibition Era" of the 1930s, an underground tunnel connected the newspaper's building to the neighboring Wausau Club, with evidence discovered in 1997 that the tunnel may have been used to store illegal caches of alcoholic beverages, and possibly served as a conduit for "female entertainers."

The newspaper ceased publication in 1940.

=== Online and digital medium ===
In 2017, Shereen Siewart, a local journalist, with support from a non-profit organization, founded the online news and commentary site, and named it Wausau Pilot and Review.

== Policy and content ==
=== General ===
The Wausau Pilot and Review Corporation describes Wausau Pilot & Review as "an independent, 501c3 nonprofit newsroom" committed to "educating the public" on "crucial issues in central Wisconsin".

The newspaper focuses on local, original and nonpartisan reporting and does not endorse or support any political candidate and publishes a public privacy and conflict of interest statement. It adheres to the Code of Ethics of the Society of Professional Journalists.

The site performs explanatory reporting, investigative reporting, and collaborations with other newsrooms, covering elections and voting, government, criminal justice, economic development, environment and energy.

The newspaper's journalists focus on "government accountability," and on matters of "public policy" and on "quality of life issues". It takes particular interest in public spending, poverty, the underprivileged, education, the justice system, health care, mental health, and the elderly.

Their site also publishes commentary from the community, and reader comments on individual stories. The site does not endorse political candidates, and does not publish "unsigned editorials representing an institutional position." It encourages "broad-ranging... discussion [reppresenting] many points of view."

== Policy and content ==
The newspaper has earned several state and national awards for reporting including a first-place award and a finalist designation in a second category in 2022 in the Local Independent Online Newspaper Publishers awards, national honors that draw hundreds of applicants from newsrooms across the country.

=== Immigrant attention ===
Through the non-profit journalism foundation Report for America, the site hired a reporter in 2022 to focus on the area's Hmong immigrants, and other immigrants in Marathon County, which has a large community of Southeast Asian immigrants, many of whom are non-English-speaking. All content is translated into the Hmong language, "to... ensure [they can access] critical government and other information."

== Business model and affiliations ==
The Wausau Pilot and Review is an independent, online daily newspaper, organized under a 501c3 non-profit corporation, the "Wausau Pilot and Review Corporation," It is an operation of the "Wausau Pilot and Review Corporation," a 501c3 non-profit corporation.

The site's stated "goal" is to establish a "sustainable business model" for such journalism, supported by "advertisers," "corporate sponsors," and by "members who make annual donations."

The site does not accept anonymous donations greater than $1,000, and is "committed to transparency." It seeks to collaborate with nonprofit news organizations, college journalism programs, media outlets. and citizens, it is a member of LION—the Local Independent Online News national publishing group—and is part of the media organization Institute for Nonprofit News (INN). The newspaper reported in 2021 that locally sold advertising raised 40% of total revenue, with the remaining total revenue came from memberships and donations—mostly from small donors.

== Management and staffing ==
Buzzfile reports that the business has approximately 8 employees.

The founder and publisher of the Wausau Pilot and Review (in its current form) is Shereen Siewert. She is a former news editor of an alt/weekly Wausau newspaper, The City Pages. Before that, she worked as an investigative reporter on the "Wisconsin I-Team" of USA Today, and worked "several years" as a public safety reporter for the Wausau Daily Herald.

The non-profit "Report for America" provided a reporter for one year for the site's initiative to report on, and engage with, the Hmong and other immigrants of the Wausau area, in the Hmong language. That reporter continued after the contract ended and as of 2023 remains on staff as a full-time Wausau Pilot and Review employee.
