= F. W. Kickbusch =

American politician

Frederick W. Kickbusch (sometimes misspelled Kickbush) (January 25, 1841 - September 12, 1907) was an American lumberman and firefighter from Wausau who served one term in the 31st Wisconsin Legislature as an Independent Greenbacker member of the Wisconsin State Assembly from Marathon County.

== Background ==
Kickbusch was born at Kolberg, in Pomerania, part of the Kingdom of Prussia, on January 25, 1841; he received a common school education; immigrated to America with his parents in 1857, and settled in the city of Milwaukee, but moved to Wausau in 1860, and became a lumberman. On October 28, 1864, he married Mathilde Braatz of Berlin, Wisconsin; they would have four children.

== Elective office ==
As of 1878, he had been elected county treasurer of Marathon County three times in succession as a Democrat, as well as having held other local offices such as alderman and county supervisor. In 1877 Kickbusch (a long-time volunteer firefighter) was elected president of the State Fireman's Association, an office he would hold for three years.

He was elected to the Marathon County Assembly seat as an Independent Greenbacker in 1877, with 977 votes to 799 for Democrat J. C. Clarke. He was assigned to the standing committee on the assessment and collection of taxes. He ran for re-election in 1878, but was unseated by Democratic former state senator John Ringle, who polled 1282 votes to 1226 for Kickbusch. After 1879, he abandoned the Greenback movement and returned to the Democratic Party.

In 1893, he was appointed as the United States Consul for Stettin, in his native province of Pomerania, now part of the German Empire.
