= Gerald K. Anderson =

American politician (1921–1995)

Gerald K. Anderson (April 26, 1921 – November 3, 1995) was an American legislator who served in the Wisconsin State Assembly from 1965 to 1969.

Born in Waupaca, a small town in Wisconsin's Waupaca County, Gerald Anderson attended Waupaca elementary and high schools, with a subsequent B.A. degree from what is now the University of Wisconsin-Madison in 1942. from 1942 to 1945, during World War II, he served in the United States Army and also, in 1943, studied at the University of Missouri. Receiving his law degree (LL.B.) from the University of Wisconsin Law School, he became an attorney and, in 1964, district attorney of Waupaca County. Later that year, he received the Republican nomination for a seat in the State Assembly and was elected in November, with appointment to Legislative Council Judiciary Committee.
