= Leigh Yawkey Woodson Art Museum =

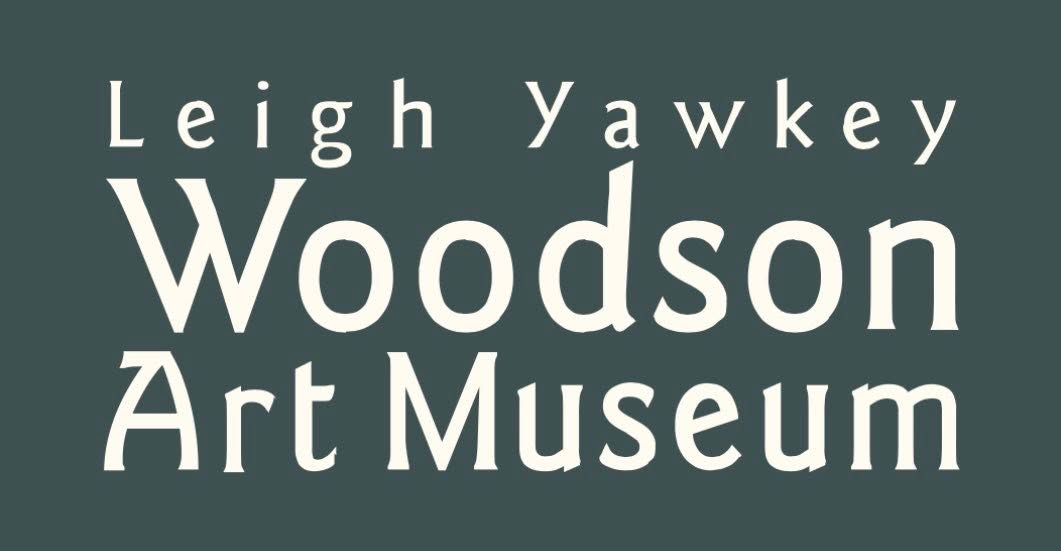

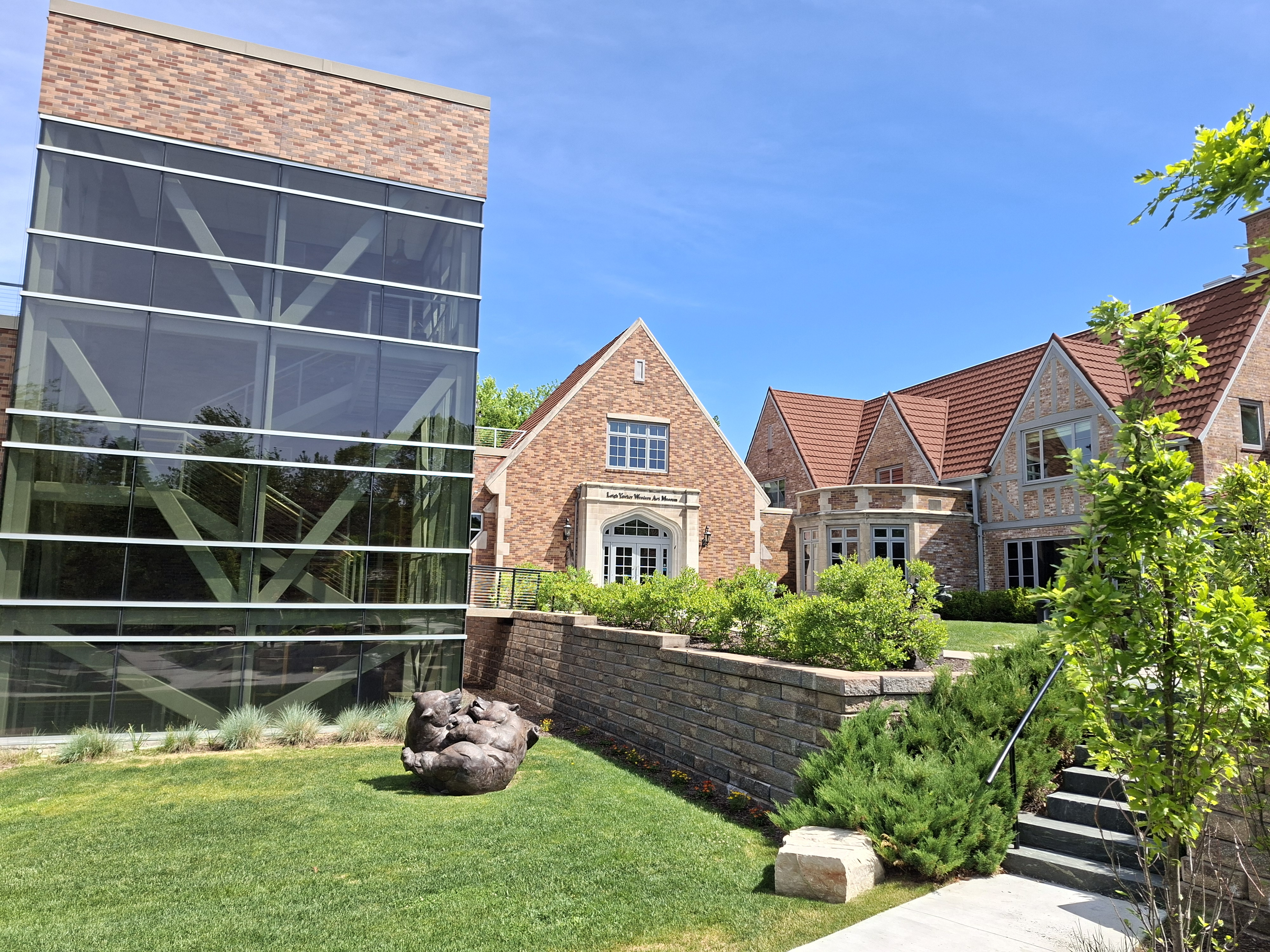
- Main entrance to the museum in 2026
- Established: September 1976; 50 years ago
- Location: Wausau, Wisconsin
- Coordinates: 44.962°N 89.613°W
- Type: Art museum
- Collection size: 14,000 works
- Director: Matt Foss
- Public transit access: Metro Ride
- Website: www.lywam.org

The Leigh Yawkey Woodson Art Museum is located in Wausau, Wisconsin. It is best known for its annual Birds in Art exhibition, which exhibits contemporary artistic representations of birds. The annual exhibition has been held beginning the week after Labor Day since the museum's founding in 1976.

The museum stands on a 4-acre (16,000 m^{2}) estate in a 1931 Tudor Revival-style house previously owned by Alice Woodson Forester (1918–1994) and John E. Forester (1913–2008). The Foresters donated their home in 1973 and the museum opened in September 1976.

== History ==
The museum originated as a memorial to Leigh Yawkey Woodson (1888–1963), daughter of Cyrus C. Yawkey (1862–1943), a Chicago-born lumber magnate based in Wausau. After her death, her three daughters, Alice Woodson Forester, Nancy Woodson Spire (1917–1998), and Margaret Woodson Fisher (1920–1972), envisioned creating an art museum in her honor. In 1973, Forester and her husband John donated their Tudor Revival-style home and estate in Wausau to serve as the museum’s site. The institution was incorporated the same year as a nonprofit educational organization.

Following renovations and the addition of gallery space, the museum opened to the public in September 1976. Its inaugural exhibition was organized with the help of Wisconsin wildlife artist Owen J. Gromme (1896–1991) and evolved into the annual exhibition Birds in Art. The museum received accreditation from the American Alliance of Museums three years later, in 1979, with subsequent re-accreditations in later decades.

Physically, the institution expanded to accommodate its growing collections, building a second two-story gallery in 1987, a new main entrance in 1997, and a 9,000-square-foot addition in 2012, the latter adding 5,000 sq. ft. of gallery space to the museum.

In 2017, the museum received the National Medal for Museum and Library Service from the Institute of Museum and Library Services, recognizing its impact on community engagement.

== Collection ==
The museum's collection comprises works by a large number of 19th- and 20th-century European and American artists, many of them bird-themed, including paintings by Jasper Francis Cropsey, Childe Hassam, Martin Johnson Heade, Gustave Caillebotte, Camille Pissarro, Bruno Liljefors, and Andrew Wyeth, and sculpture by Antoine-Louis Barye, Harriet Whitney Frishmuth, Gaston Lachaise, and Paul Manship. Among artists whose works on paper are represented in the collection are Mary Cassatt, John Steuart Curry, Joseph Stella, Andy Warhol, and Joseph Cornell.

As of 2011, the collection comprised 4,629 artworks. That number, however, jumped to 14,000 as of 2026.

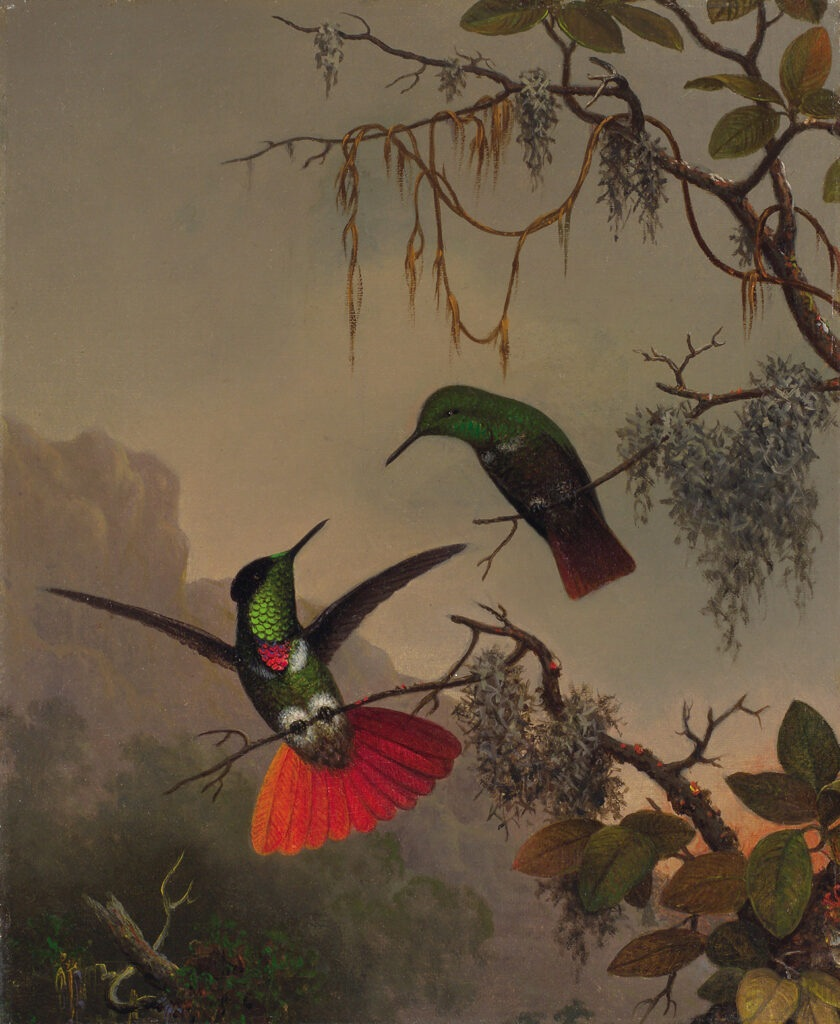
Martin Johnson Heade, Two Hooded Visorbearer Hummingbirds, 1864-65

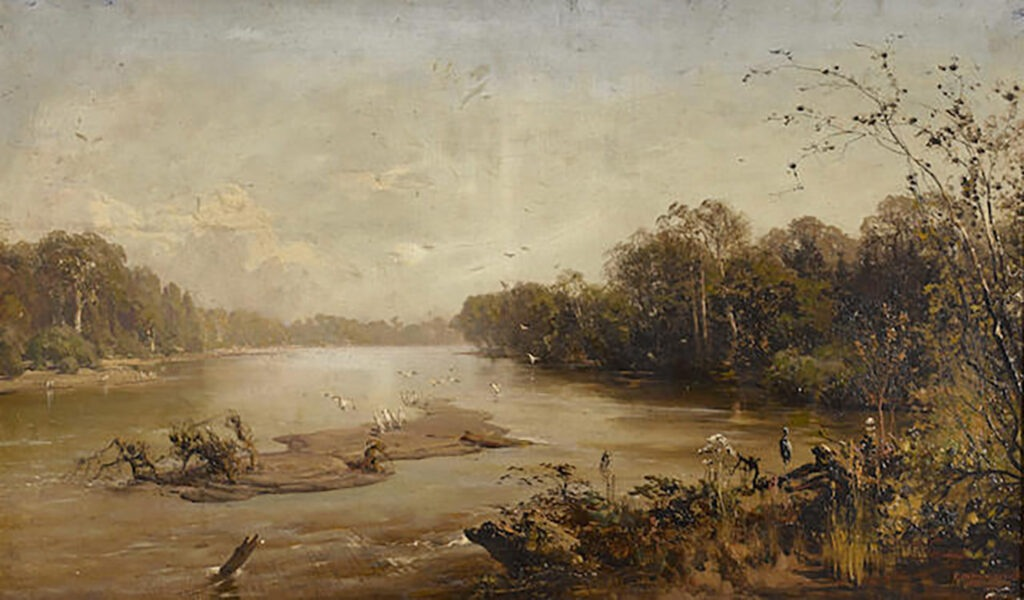
Thomas Hill, River Landscape, 1878

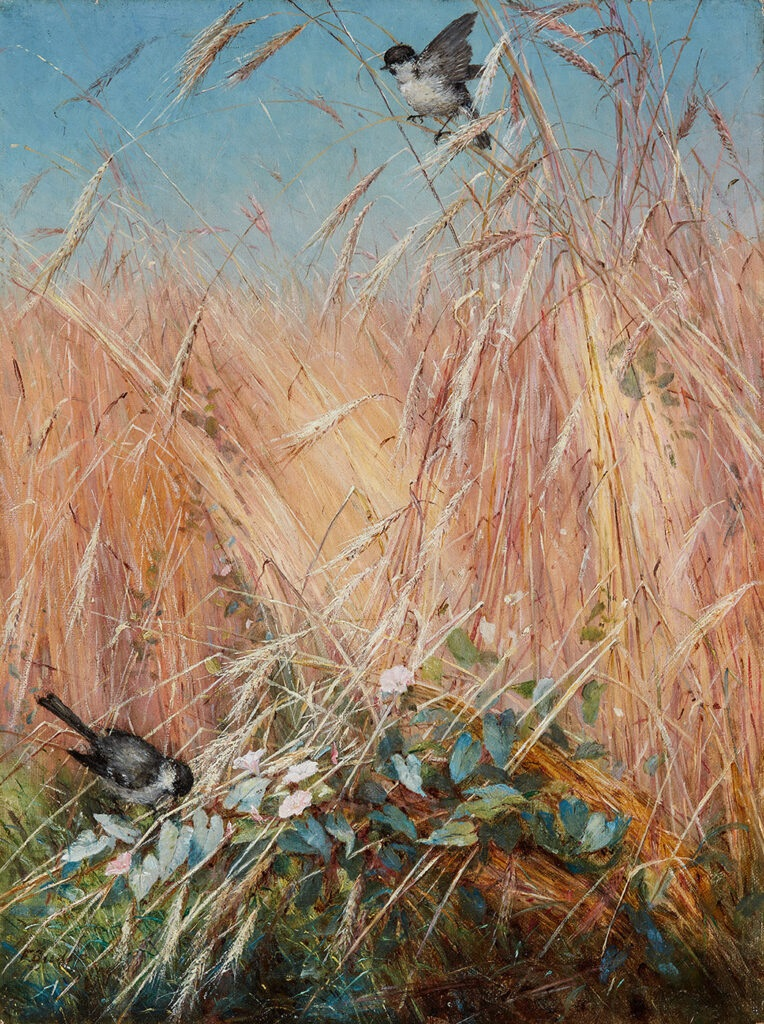
Fidelia Bridges, Chickadees, Wheat, and Morning Glory, 1879

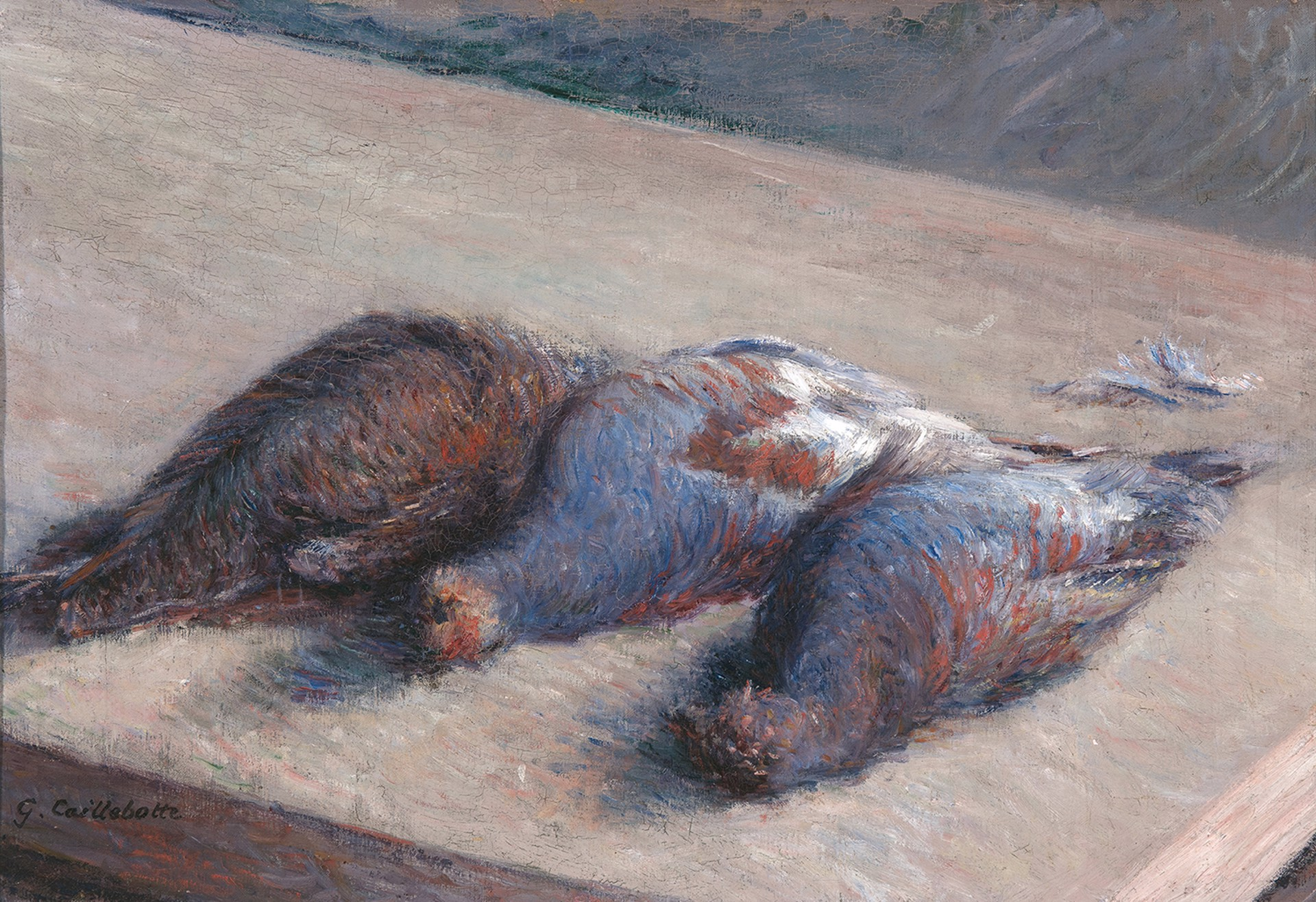
Gustave Caillebotte, Three Partridges on a Table, ca. 1880

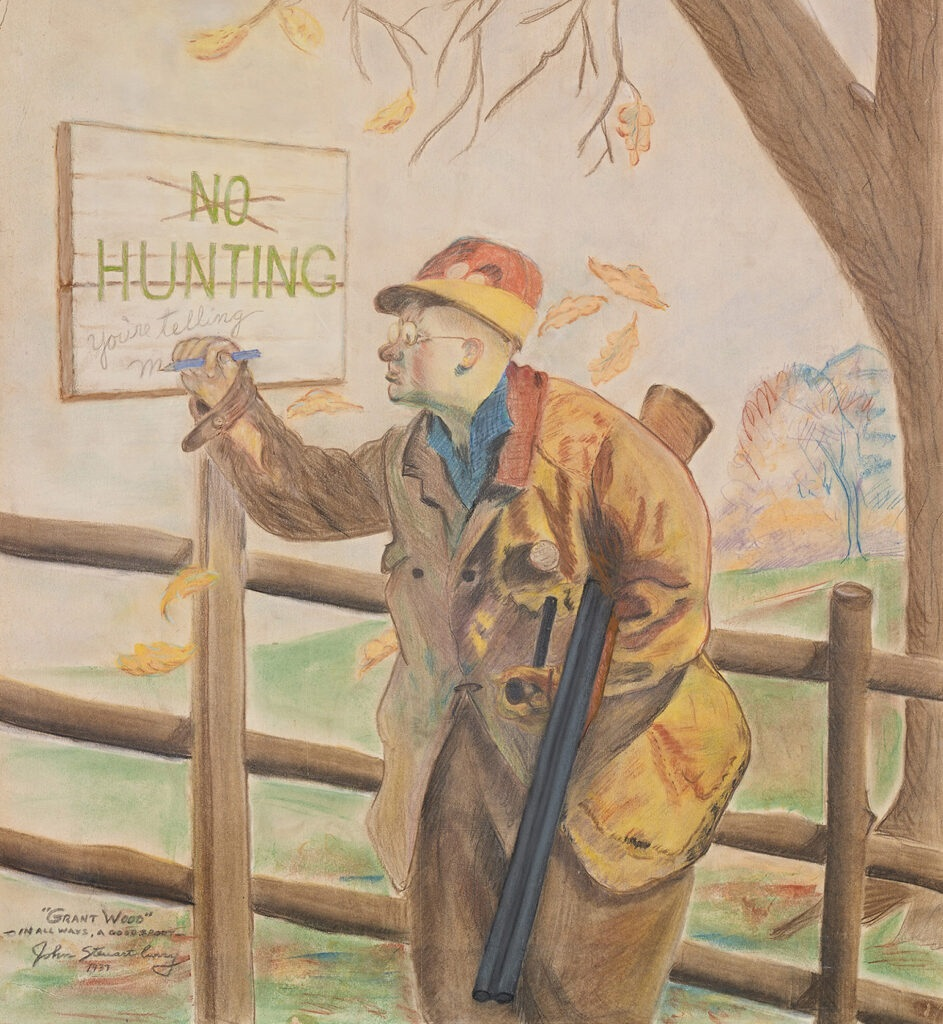
John Steuart Curry, Grant Wood, 1937
