= George Werheim =

American politician

George Werheim, Sr. (January 6, 1834 – August 27, 1925) was an American politician and businessman.

Born in the Grand Duchy of Hesse, Werheim emigrated to the United States in 1852. He worked as a carpenter in Chicago, Illinois and then moved to Wausau, Wisconsin in 1855. He owned a manufacturing company. Werheim served as a village trustee for Wausau, Wisconsin became a city and then on the Wausau Common Council. He also served as city treasurer, under sheriff, and as coroner for Marathon County, Wisconsin. Werheim served in the Wisconsin State Assembly from 1895 to 1896 and 1899 to 1900. He was a Republican.
