= Edward C. Kretlow =

American politician

Edward C. Kretlow (July 22, 1852 – October 27, 1925) was an American businessman and politician.

Born in Germany, Kretlow emigrated with his family and settled in Milwaukee, Wisconsin. Kretlow went to Spencer Business School and worked in the cigar making business with his father. In 1866, he moved to Wausau, Wisconsin. He moved to Chicago, Illinois, in 1869, where he was again in the cigar business before returning to Wausau. He was a bookkeeper and owned an abstract business. He was elected Wausau City Clerk and then Register of Deeds for Marathon County. Kretlow was a Democrat. In 1915, Kretlow served in the Wisconsin State Assembly.
