= Arthur J. Plowman =

American politician

Arthur J. Plowman (October 28, 1872 – September 28, 1942) was an American politician, farmer, and businessman.

Born in the town of Waupaca, Plowman moved to Elderon, Wisconsin, in 1897, where he was a farmer and raised Guernsey dairy cows. He was involved with the bank, telephone and creamery businesses. He served on the Elderon Town Board. the Marathon County, Wisconsin Board of Supervisor, and as clerk on the local school board. Plowman was also involved with the Marathon County Agricultural Society. Plowman served in the Wisconsin State Assembly and was a Democrat.
