= Waupaca (town), Wisconsin =

Waupaca, Wisconsin
- Town
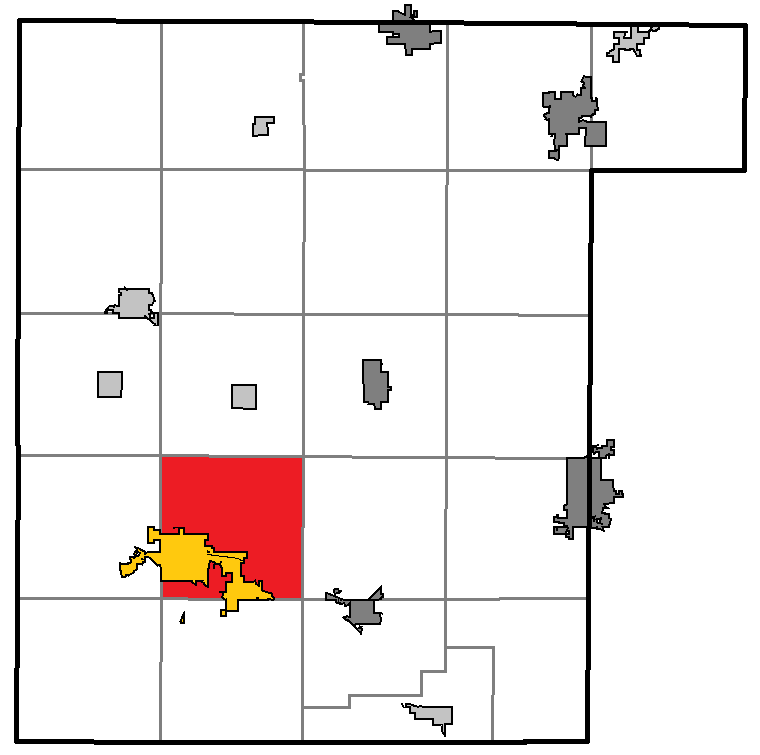
- Location of Waupaca, within Waupaca County
- Coordinates: 44°22′51″N 89°3′9″W
- Country: United States
- State: Wisconsin
- County: Waupaca

Area
  - Total: 30.8 sq mi (79.9 km^{2})
  - Land: 30.8 sq mi (79.7 km^{2})
  - Water: 0.077 sq mi (0.2 km^{2})
- Elevation: 833 ft (254 m)

Population (2020)
  - Total: 1,194
  - Density: 38.8/sq mi (15.0/km^{2})
- Time zone: UTC-6 (Central (CST))
  - Summer (DST): UTC-5 (CDT)
- Area codes: 715 & 534
- FIPS code: 55-84400
- GNIS feature ID: 1584376
- Website: https://www.tn.waupaca.wi.gov/

Waupaca is a town in Waupaca County, Wisconsin, United States. The population was 1,194 at the 2020 census. The City of Waupaca is located mostly within the town, though it is politically independent. The ghost town of Granite Quarry was also located partially in the town.

== Geography ==
According to the United States Census Bureau, the town has a total area of 30.9 square miles (79.9 km^{2}), of which 30.8 square miles (79.7 km^{2}) is land and 0.1 square miles (0.2 km^{2}) (0.29%) is water.

== Demographics ==
At the 2000 census, there were 1,155 people, 417 households and 328 families residing in the town. The population density was 37.5 per square mile (14.5/km^{2}). There were 448 housing units at an average density of 14.6 per square mile (5.6/km^{2}). The racial makeup of the town was 98.01% White, 0.09% Black or African American, 0.52% Native American, 0.26% Asian, 0.09% Pacific Islander, 0.17% from other races, and 0.87% from two or more races. 0.52% of the population were Hispanic or Latino of any race.

There were 417 households, of which 36.7% had children under the age of 18 living with them, 71.9% were married couples living together, 3.8% had a female householder with no husband present, and 21.3% were non-families. 15.6% of all households were made up of individuals, and 7.0% had someone living alone who was 65 years of age or older. The average household size was 2.77 and the average family size was 3.11.

28.1% of the population were under the age of 18, 6.4% from 18 to 24, 28.5% from 25 to 44, 26.1% from 45 to 64, and 10.9% who were 65 years of age or older. The median age was 38 years. For every 100 females, there were 111.9 males. For every 100 females age 18 and over, there were 104.9 males.

The median household income was $46,667 and the median family income was $52,222. Males had a median income of $31,534 and females $22,450. The per capita income was $19,843. About 4.7% of families and 6.7% of the population were below the poverty line, including 7.1% of those under age 18 and 1.4% of those age 65 or over.

== Notable people ==
- Gerald K. Anderson, Wisconsin State Assembly legislator
- Annie Burgstede, actress
- Arthur J. Plowman, farmer and politician, was born in the town
