= Charles Hoeflinger =

American politician

Charles Hoeflinger (September 13, 1832 – September 21, 1880) was a member of the Wisconsin State Assembly.

== Biography ==
Hoeflinger was born on September 13, 1832, in Obermarchtal, Kingdom of Württemberg. He moved to Fond du Lac, Wisconsin, in 1854.

Hoeflinger and his first wife, Antoinette, had five children before her death. Later, he married Antoinette's sister, Anna. They had six children. Hoeflingfer died of stomach cancer on September 21, 1880, and is buried in Wausau, Wisconsin.

== Career ==
Hoeflinger was a member of the Assembly in 1862 and 1870. Additionally, he was Mayor of Wausau, a member of the Wausau City Council and Treasurer of Marathon County, Wisconsin. He was a Democrat.

== See also ==
- List of mayors of Wausau, Wisconsin
