= Wausau, Wisconsin =

City in Marathon County, Wisconsin, US

- City
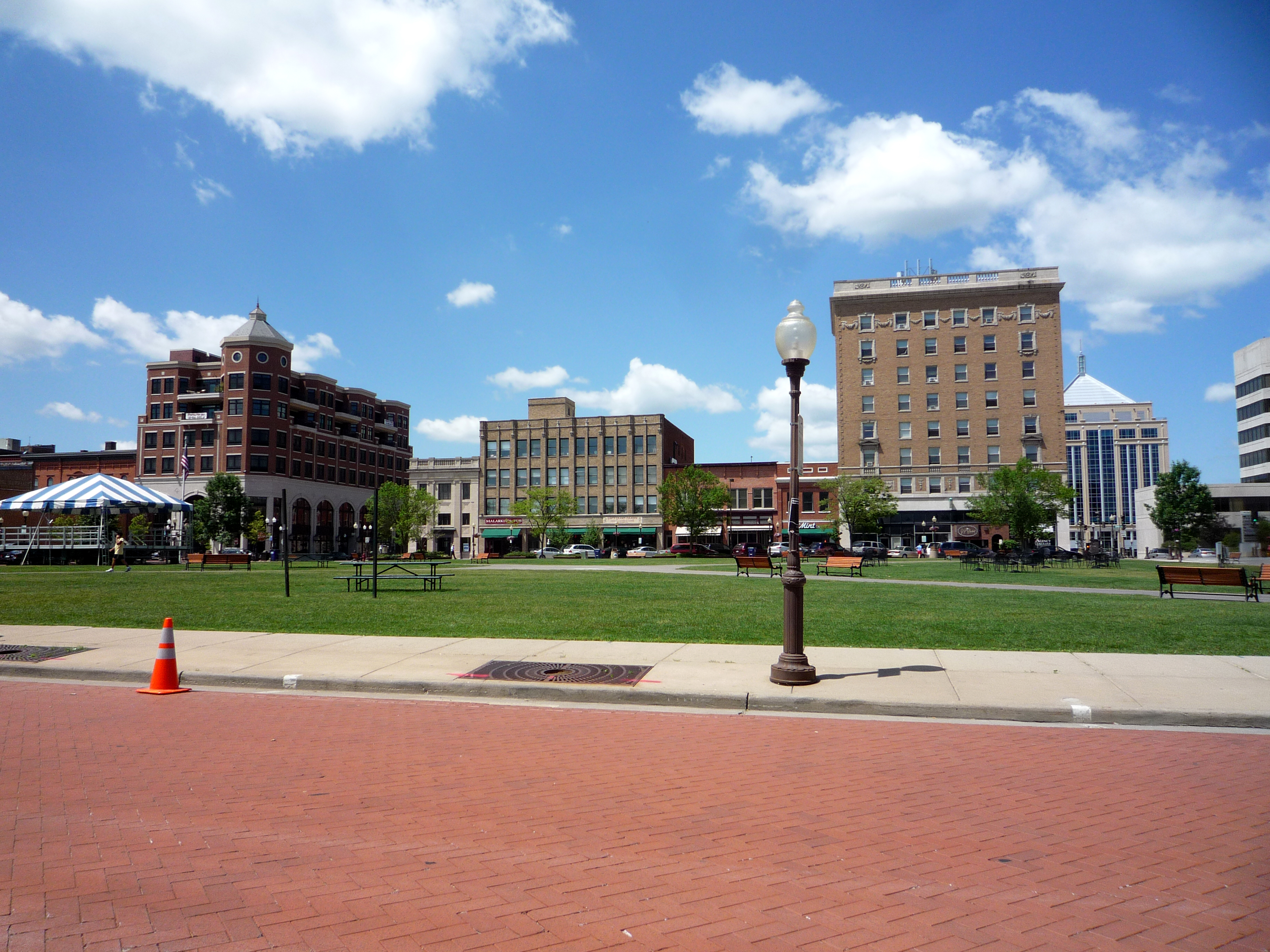
- Downtown Wausau

- Seal
- Motto: "Welcome home to Wausau."
- Interactive map of Wausau, Wisconsin
- Location within Wisconsin Location within the United States
- Coordinates: 44°57′N 89°38′W
- Country: United States
- State: Wisconsin
- County: Marathon

Government
  - Mayor: Doug Diny

Area
  - City: 20.33 sq mi (52.66 km^{2})
  - Land: 19.22 sq mi (49.77 km^{2})
  - Water: 1.11 sq mi (2.88 km^{2})
- Elevation: 1,207 ft (368 m)

Population (2020)
  - City: 39,994
  - Density: 2,081.1/sq mi (803.5/km^{2})
  - Metro: 134,063
- Time zone: UTC−6 (Central)
  - Summer (DST): UTC−5 (Central)
- ZIP Code: 54401 and 54403
- Area codes: 715 & 534
- FIPS code: 55-84475
- Website: www.wausauwi.gov

Wausau (/ˈwɔːsɔː/ WAW-saw) is a city in Marathon County, Wisconsin, United States, and its county seat. It is located on the Wisconsin River in central Wisconsin and had a population of 39,994 at the 2020 census. The Wausau metropolitan statistical area, consisting solely of Marathon County, had a population of 138,013.

The Wausau area was inhabited by various indigenous peoples, including the Ojibwe. It was settled by European immigrants in the mid-19th century and developed as a lumbering center due to its access to pine forests and river transport. Cultural and recreational attractions in Wausau include the Grand Theater, Granite Peak Ski Area, Rib Mountain State Park, Leigh Yawkey Woodson Art Museum, and the Wisconsin River.

== History ==
=== Establishment and early history ===
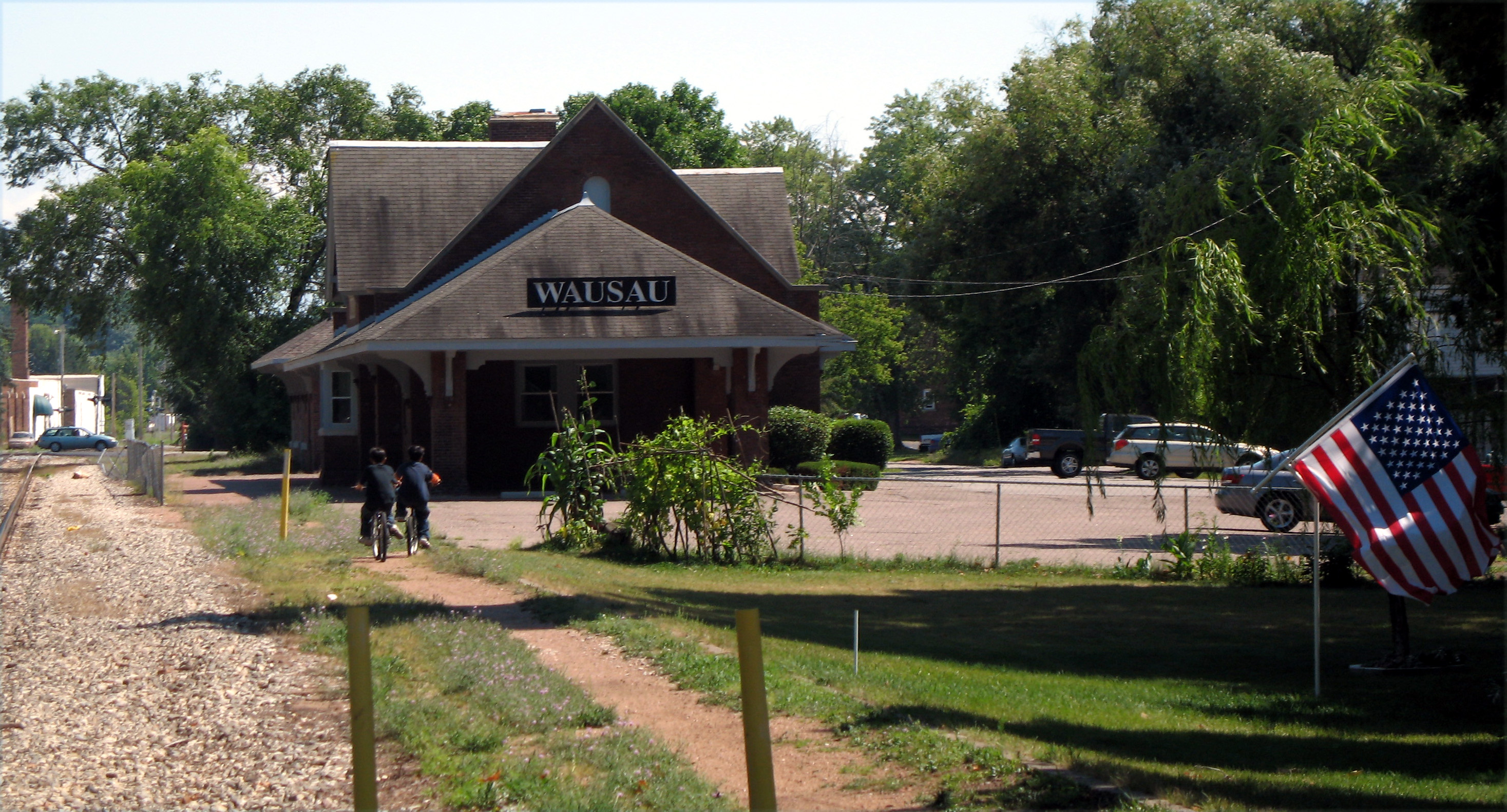
The original Milwaukee Road train station

This area has for millennia changed hands between various indigenous peoples. The Ojibwe (also known in the United States as the Chippewa) occupied it in the period of European encounter. They had a lucrative fur trade for decades with French colonists and French Canadians. After the French and Indian War this trade was dominated by British-American trappers from the eastern seaboard.

The Wisconsin River first drew European-American settlers to the area during the mid-19th century as they migrated west into the Great Lakes region following construction of the Erie Canal in New York State. This provided a route for products from the region to the large New York and other eastern markets. The area had been called "Big Bull Flats" or "Big Bull Falls" by French explorers, who were the first Europeans here. They named it for the long rapids in the river, which created many bubbles, called bulle in French. By an 1836 treaty with the United States, the Ojibwe ceded much of their lands in the area to federal ownership. It was sold to non-Native peoples. Wausau, from Ojibwe “waasa”, means "a faraway place".

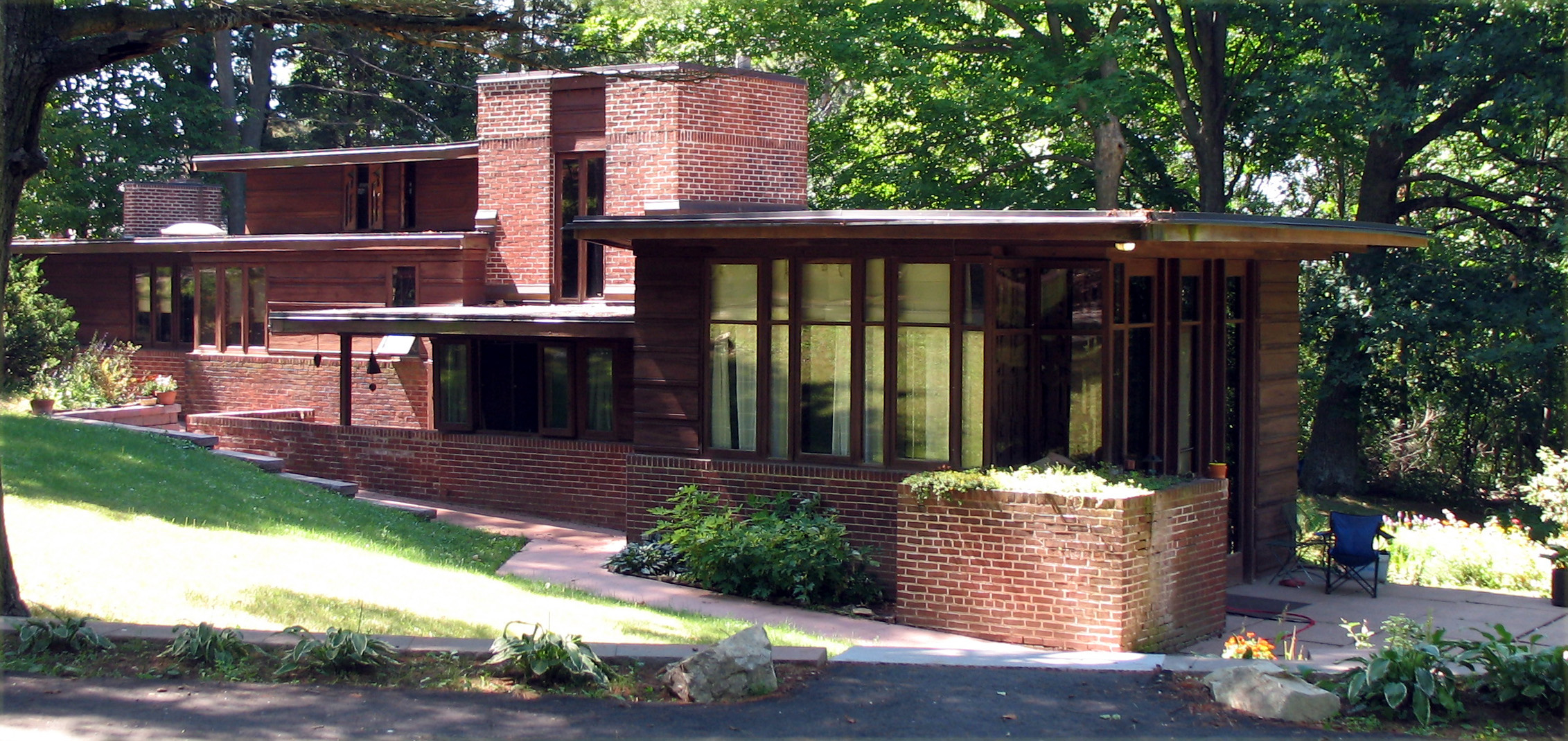
This Frank Lloyd Wright–designed house is one of two in Wausau. Several Prairie School houses are in Wausau.

George Stevens, the namesake of the city of Stevens Point south of Wausau, began harvesting the pine forests for lumber in 1840 and built a sawmill. Lumbering was the first major industry in this area, and other sawmills along the Wisconsin River were quickly constructed by entrepreneurs. By 1846, Walter McIndoe arrived and took the lead in the local business and community. His efforts helped to establish Marathon County in 1850. Word of Stevens's success in the region spread across the country throughout the logging industry.

By 1852, Wausau had been established as a town and continued to grow and mature. German immigration into the area following the Revolutions of 1848 in the German states brought more people, and by 1861, the settlement was incorporated as a village.

Churches, schools, industry and social organizations began to flourish. The state granted the city a charter in 1872, and elections are held the first Tuesday in April. The residents elected August Kickbusch as their first mayor in 1872. Five years earlier, Kickbusch had returned to his homeland of Germany and brought back with him 702 people, all of whom are believed to have settled in the Wausau area. Kickbusch founded the A. Kickbusch Wholesale Grocery Company, a family business carried on by his grandson, August Kickbusch II. In 1917, Kickbusch II bought a modest four-square-style house at 513 Grant Street. He made extensive additions, adding two sunrooms, arcaded windows, a tiled porch in the Mediterranean style, a formal classical entrance, and ornate custom-designed chimney crowns. The home is on the National Register of Historic Places as part of the Andrew Warren Historic District.

When the railroad arrived in 1874, Wausau became more accessible to settlers and industry. This enabled the city to develop alternatives to the lumber industry, which was in decline since the clear-cutting of many forests. By 1906 the lumber was gone, but the city continued to grow and flourish. Other villages and towns in the area declined because of over-harvesting of the forests and lumber mills closed down.

=== 20th century to present ===
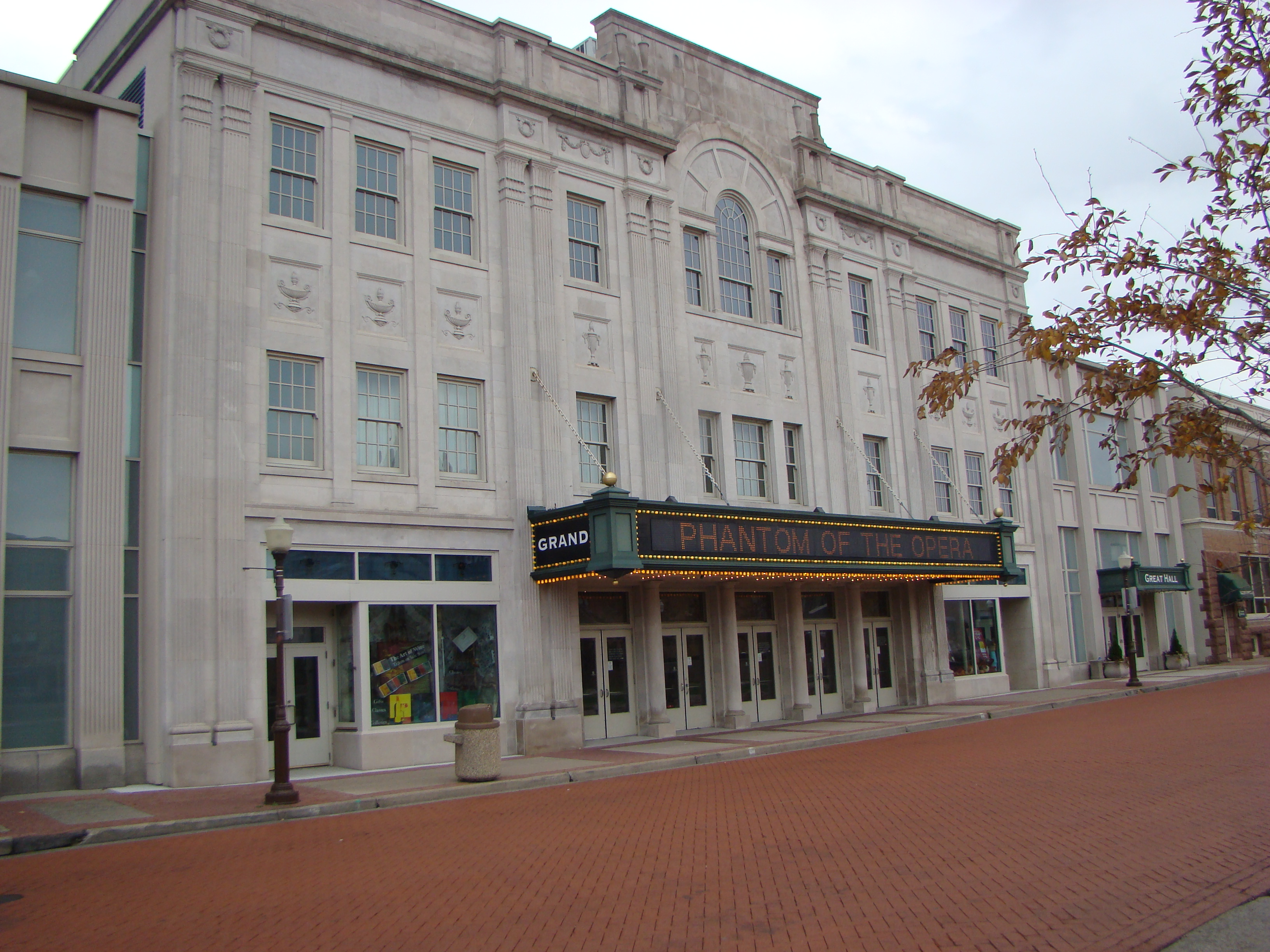
The Grand Theater, built in 1927, replaced the Grand Opera House (1899)

Wausau's location on the Wisconsin River was partly responsible for its survival. The economy was diversified in the early 20th century, led by Employers Insurance of Wausau, now a part of Liberty Mutual. Its logo, first introduced in 1954, was the downtown Milwaukee Road railroad depot set against the backdrop of the community's skyline.

The Wall Street crash of 1929 had a major effect on the Wausau area. Many industries were forced to cut back by laying off and dismissing workers or by closing altogether. After decades of growth, the city virtually ground to a halt. However, after World War II Wausau was significantly modernized; it continued to grow in industry, education, recreation, and retail, more than in population.

After the fall of Saigon, Hmong refugees from Southeast Asia who fought alongside the CIA immigrated to Wausau at the end of the 1970s. Wausau church organizations (Catholic and Lutheran) helped Hmong refugees adapt to American life.

In 1983, the Wausau Center shopping mall opened. By the mid- to late-1990s, Wausau began to buy and develop parts of West Industrial Park to meet the needs of the expanding economy and companies. In the late 1990s, the city demolished several aging buildings on a square in the center of downtown, creating what is known as the 400 Block, an open, grassy block with paved sidewalks crossing it. The square is a focal point for summer festivals. In recent years Wausau has redone the 400 Block, adding a permanent stage and other renovations that cost $2 million.

By the end of the 20th century, Wausau began to implement the Wausau Central Business District Master Plan, which included redevelopment and economic restructuring of downtown Wausau. The tallest commercial building in Wisconsin outside of Milwaukee is in Wausau: the 241-foot Dudley tower.

== Geography ==
Wausau is located at 44°57′N 89°38′W.

According to the United States Census Bureau, the city has an area of 20.33 square miles (52.7 km^{2}), of which 19.22 square miles (49.8 km^{2}) is land and 1.11 square miles (2.9 km^{2}) is water. The city is at an altitude of 1,195 feet (364 m). Wausau is close to the center of the northern half of the Western Hemisphere. Just west of Wausau, 45°N meets 90°W (45°N 90°W), which is exactly halfway between the equator and the north pole and a quarter of the way around the world from the prime meridian.

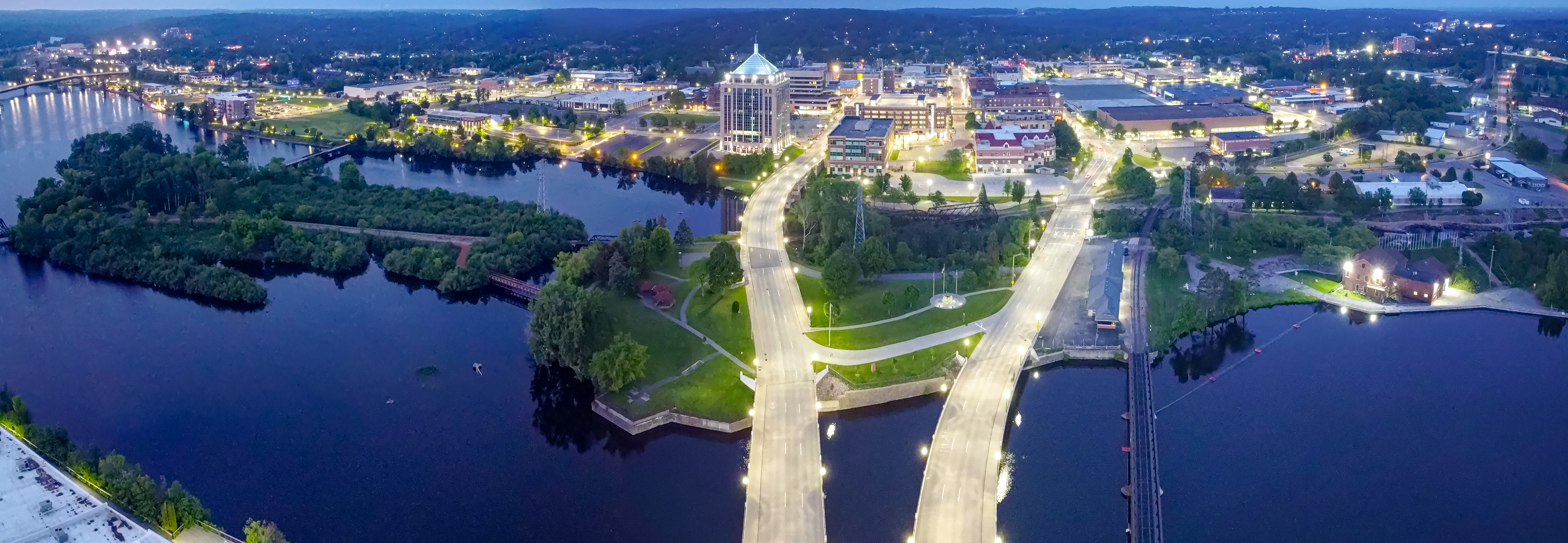

=== Climate ===
Wausau's climate is classified as warm summer humid continental (Dfb). It is built on or around a hemiboreal forest, which has some of the characteristics of a boreal forest and shares some of the features of the temperate zone forests to the south. Coniferous trees predominate in the hemiboreal zone, but a significant number of deciduous species are found there, as well.

Climate data for Wausau Downtown Airport, Wisconsin (1991–2020 normals, (Note: Mean monthly maxima and minima (i.e. the expected highest and lowest temperature readings at any point during the year or given month) calculated based on data at said location from 1991 to 2020.) extremes 1895–present)
| Month | Jan | Feb | Mar | Apr | May | Jun | Jul | Aug | Sep | Oct | Nov | Dec | Year |
|---|---|---|---|---|---|---|---|---|---|---|---|---|---|
| Record high °F (°C) | 54 (12) | 59 (15) | 80 (27) | 91 (33) | 104 (40) | 100 (38) | 107 (42) | 99 (37) | 99 (37) | 91 (33) | 75 (24) | 61 (16) | 107 (42) |
| Mean maximum °F (°C) | 41 (5) | 46 (8) | 61 (16) | 77 (25) | 85 (29) | 90 (32) | 90 (32) | 89 (32) | 85 (29) | 76 (24) | 60 (16) | 45 (7) | 93 (34) |
| Mean daily maximum °F (°C) | 22.8 (−5.1) | 27.4 (−2.6) | 39.6 (4.2) | 53.7 (12.1) | 67.1 (19.5) | 76.2 (24.6) | 80.3 (26.8) | 77.9 (25.5) | 69.8 (21.0) | 55.7 (13.2) | 40.4 (4.7) | 27.9 (−2.3) | 53.2 (11.8) |
| Daily mean °F (°C) | 14.8 (−9.6) | 18.5 (−7.5) | 30.1 (−1.1) | 43.1 (6.2) | 55.8 (13.2) | 65.4 (18.6) | 69.5 (20.8) | 67.4 (19.7) | 59.2 (15.1) | 46.3 (7.9) | 32.8 (0.4) | 20.7 (−6.3) | 43.6 (6.4) |
| Mean daily minimum °F (°C) | 6.7 (−14.1) | 9.5 (−12.5) | 20.6 (−6.3) | 32.4 (0.2) | 44.6 (7.0) | 54.5 (12.5) | 58.7 (14.8) | 56.9 (13.8) | 48.6 (9.2) | 37.0 (2.8) | 25.2 (−3.8) | 13.5 (−10.3) | 34.0 (1.1) |
| Mean minimum °F (°C) | −16 (−27) | −12 (−24) | −1 (−18) | 19 (−7) | 31 (−1) | 41 (5) | 49 (9) | 46 (8) | 34 (1) | 24 (−4) | 9 (−13) | −8 (−22) | −19 (−28) |
| Record low °F (°C) | −40 (−40) | −40 (−40) | −33 (−36) | 3 (−16) | 20 (−7) | 29 (−2) | 37 (3) | 32 (0) | 18 (−8) | 8 (−13) | −15 (−26) | −27 (−33) | −40 (−40) |
| Average precipitation inches (mm) | 1.20 (30) | 1.08 (27) | 1.83 (46) | 3.12 (79) | 3.79 (96) | 4.67 (119) | 3.86 (98) | 4.07 (103) | 3.83 (97) | 3.07 (78) | 1.85 (47) | 1.54 (39) | 33.91 (861) |
| Average snowfall inches (cm) | 14.8 (38) | 12.7 (32) | 8.3 (21) | 6.5 (17) | 0.2 (0.51) | 0.0 (0.0) | 0.0 (0.0) | 0.0 (0.0) | 0.0 (0.0) | 0.9 (2.3) | 6.5 (17) | 14.4 (37) | 64.3 (163) |
| Average precipitation days (≥ 0.01 in) | 10.5 | 8.3 | 9.4 | 12.0 | 13.4 | 12.8 | 11.5 | 10.6 | 11.5 | 10.7 | 9.8 | 10.6 | 131.1 |
| Average snowy days (≥ 0.1 in) | 11.3 | 8.7 | 6.3 | 3.6 | 0.2 | 0.0 | 0.0 | 0.0 | 0.0 | 0.8 | 5.6 | 10.6 | 47.1 |
Source: NOAA

== Demographics ==
Historical population
| Census | Pop. | Note | %± |
|---|---|---|---|
| 1860 | 543 | | — |
| 1870 | 1,349 | | 148.4% |
| 1880 | 4,277 | | 217.0% |
| 1890 | 9,253 | | 116.3% |
| 1900 | 12,354 | | 33.5% |
| 1910 | 16,560 | | 34.0% |
| 1920 | 18,951 | | 14.4% |
| 1930 | 23,758 | | 25.4% |
| 1940 | 27,268 | | 14.8% |
| 1950 | 30,386 | | 11.4% |
| 1960 | 31,943 | | 5.1% |
| 1970 | 32,806 | | 2.7% |
| 1980 | 32,426 | | −1.2% |
| 1990 | 37,060 | | 14.3% |
| 2000 | 38,426 | | 3.7% |
| 2010 | 39,114 | | 1.8% |
| 2020 | 39,994 | | 2.2% |
U.S. Decennial Census

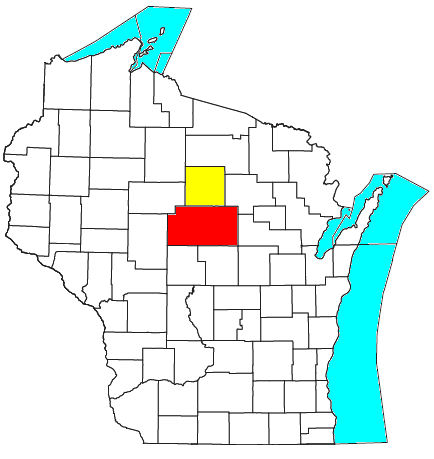
Location of the Wausau–Merrill CSA and its components: Wausau Metropolitan Statistical Area Merrill Micropolitan Statistical Area

The city's suburbs include Schofield, Weston, Mosinee, Maine, Rib Mountain, Kronenwetter, and Rothschild. Wausau is the larger principal city of the Wausau–Merrill CSA, a Combined Statistical Area that includes the Wausau metropolitan area (Marathon County) and the Merrill micropolitan area (Lincoln County), which had a combined population of 155,475 at the 2000 census.

In 1996, a US census estimate found the Hmong people were the largest ethnic minority group in Wausau, with about 11% of the population.

=== 2020 census ===
As of the 2020 census, Wausau had a population of 39,994. The population density was 2,081.1 inhabitants per square mile (803.5/km^{2}). The median age was 38.1 years. 21.8% of residents were under the age of 18 and 18.1% of residents were 65 years of age or older. For every 100 females there were 98.0 males, and for every 100 females age 18 and over there were 96.6 males age 18 and over.

98.3% of residents lived in urban areas, while 1.7% lived in rural areas.

There were 17,420 households in Wausau, of which 24.9% had children under the age of 18 living in them. Of all households, 36.9% were married-couple households, 23.4% were households with a male householder and no spouse or partner present, and 29.9% were households with a female householder and no spouse or partner present. About 38.0% of all households were made up of individuals and 14.1% had someone living alone who was 65 years of age or older.

There were 18,605 housing units, with an average density of 968.1 units per square mile (373.8 units/km^{2}). Of those units, 6.4% were vacant. The homeowner vacancy rate was 1.6% and the rental vacancy rate was 7.0%.

Racial composition as of the 2020 census
| Race | Number | Percent |
|---|---|---|
| White | 31,298 | 78.3% |
| Black or African American | 672 | 1.7% |
| American Indian and Alaska Native | 292 | 0.7% |
| Asian | 4,757 | 11.9% |
| Native Hawaiian and Other Pacific Islander | 18 | 0.0% |
| Some other race | 702 | 1.8% |
| Two or more races | 2,255 | 5.6% |
| Hispanic or Latino (of any race) | 1,650 | 4.1% |

=== 2010 census ===
As of the census of 2010, there were 39,106 people, 16,487 households, and 9,415 families residing in the city. The population density was 2,082.3 inhabitants per square mile (804.0/km^{2}). There were 18,154 housing units at an average density of 966.7 units per square mile (373.2 units/km^{2}). The racial makeup of the city was 83.7% White, 1.4% African American, 0.8% Native American, 11.1% Asian, 0.9% from other races, and 2.3% from two or more races. Hispanic or Latino of any race were 2.9% of the population.

There were 16,487 households, of which 28.1% had children under the age of 18 living with them, 40.7% were married couples living together, 11.5% had a female householder with no husband present, 4.9% had a male householder with no wife present, and 42.9% were non-families. 35.4% of all households were made up of individuals, and 13.1% had someone living alone who was 65 years of age or older. The average household size was 2.31 and the average family size was 3.02.

The median age in the city was 36.8 years. 23.5% of residents were under the age of 18; 10% were between the ages of 18 and 24; 25.9% were from 25 to 44; 24.7% were from 45 to 64; and 15.7% were 65 years of age or older. The gender makeup of the city was 49.1% male and 50.9% female.

=== 2000 census ===
As of the census of 2000, 38,426 people, 15,678 households, and 9,328 families resided in the city. The population density was 2,330.7 people per square mile (899.9 people/km^{2}). There were 16,668 housing units at an average density of 1,011.0 units per square mile (390.3 units/km^{2}). The racial makeup of the city was 85.91% White, 0.54% Black or African American, 0.59% Native American, 11.41% Asian, 0.04% Pacific Islander, 0.30% from other races, and 1.21% from two or more races. About 1.04% of the population were Hispanic or Latino of any race.

Of the 15,678 households, 27.8% had children under the age of 18 living with them, 46.7% were married couples living together, 9.5% had a female householder with no husband present, and 40.5% were not families. About 33.6% of all households were made up of individuals, and 14.1% had someone living alone who was 65 years of age or older. The average household size was 2.37 and the average family size was 3.08.

In the city, the population was distributed as 25.4% under the age of 18, 9.6% from 18 to 24, 27.5% from 25 to 44, 20.4% from 45 to 64, and 17.1% who were 65 years of age or older. The median age was 36 years. For every 100 females, there were 92.5 males. For every 100 females age 18 and over, there were 88.3 males.

The median income for a household in the city was $36,831, and for a family was $47,065. Males had a median income of $33,076 versus $24,303 for females. The per capita income for the city was $20,227. About 7.2% of families and 11.4% of the population were below the poverty line, including 18.1% of those under age 18 and 8.4% of those age 65 or over.

=== Hmong population ===
As of 2003, Hmong Americans were Wausau's largest ethnic minority. Churches and social service agencies settled refugees, most of them Hmong with some Vietnamese and Lao, in Wausau after the Vietnam War. According to the 1980 United States census, the Wausau SMSA had fewer than 1% nonwhite people. There were several dozen immigrants in 1978. By 1980 Wausau had 200 immigrants. This increased to 400 in 1982 and 800 in 1984.

In 1981 there were 160 Hmong students in the Wausau School District and in 1991 1,010. In a period ending in 1994 the tax rate of the Wausau School District rose by 10.48% as a result of the expenses of services to children from immigrant families. The increase was three times as high as the increase in an adjacent school district without a large immigrant population. By 1994 Wausau had 4,200 refugees. By 1996 the number of Hmong students in the school district was over 2,000. In 1998 this number reached its peak, 2,214. The city experienced some social upheaval following the Hmong arrival. Some schools in Wausau had a minority of English speakers and some were predominantly Hmong students. Some native-born American families in Wausau criticized the crime and expenses in social services.

Per the 2022 American Community Survey five-year estimates, the Hmong population was 3,885, over 80% of the city's Asian population.

As of 2003, "Sixty percent of Hmong families are homeowners. Although more than half of the workforce is earning less than $8 an hour, the welfare rate has dropped to less than 5 percent. More people are going to college. And test scores and graduation rates of Hmong public school students are steadily rising."

In Wausau there is relatively little Hmong-language media because, for much of its history, the Hmong language was not written.

== Economy ==
Nearly one-third of the Marathon County economy is based in manufacturing, with the balance in the service industry. Prominent industries include paper manufacturing, insurance, home manufacturing, and tourism. The Wausau region has a lower-than-average unemployment rate and continues a steady growth in job creation and economic viability among manufacturers and service providers alike. Wausau has 12 banks with 41 branch locations, three trust companies and three holding companies in the metropolitan area. There are also 13 open membership credit unions with 18 branch locations.

The Wausau area is a center for cultivation of American ginseng, and is also known for its red granite, which is quarried nearby.

== Arts and culture ==
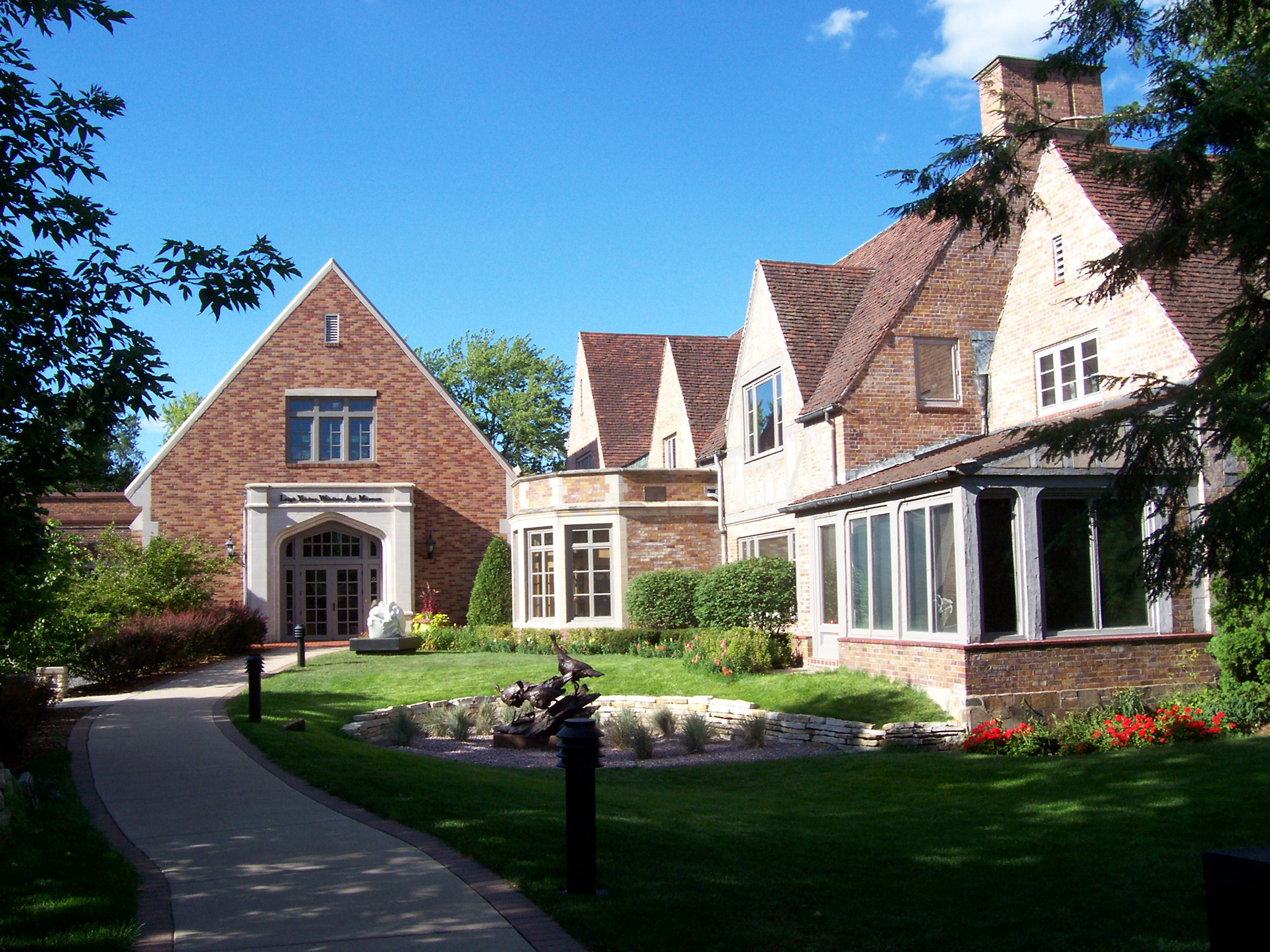
Leigh Yawkey Woodson Art Museum

Entertainment available in the city includes Exhibitour, Concerts on the Square, Market Place Thursdays, Screen on the Green, and the Hmong New Year.

Wausau is home to the Leigh Yawkey Woodson Art Museum, which houses the "Birds in Art" collection as well as Leigh Yawkey Woodson's collection of decorative glass.

The Grand Theater is in downtown Wausau. It hosts local and national shows.

== Sports ==
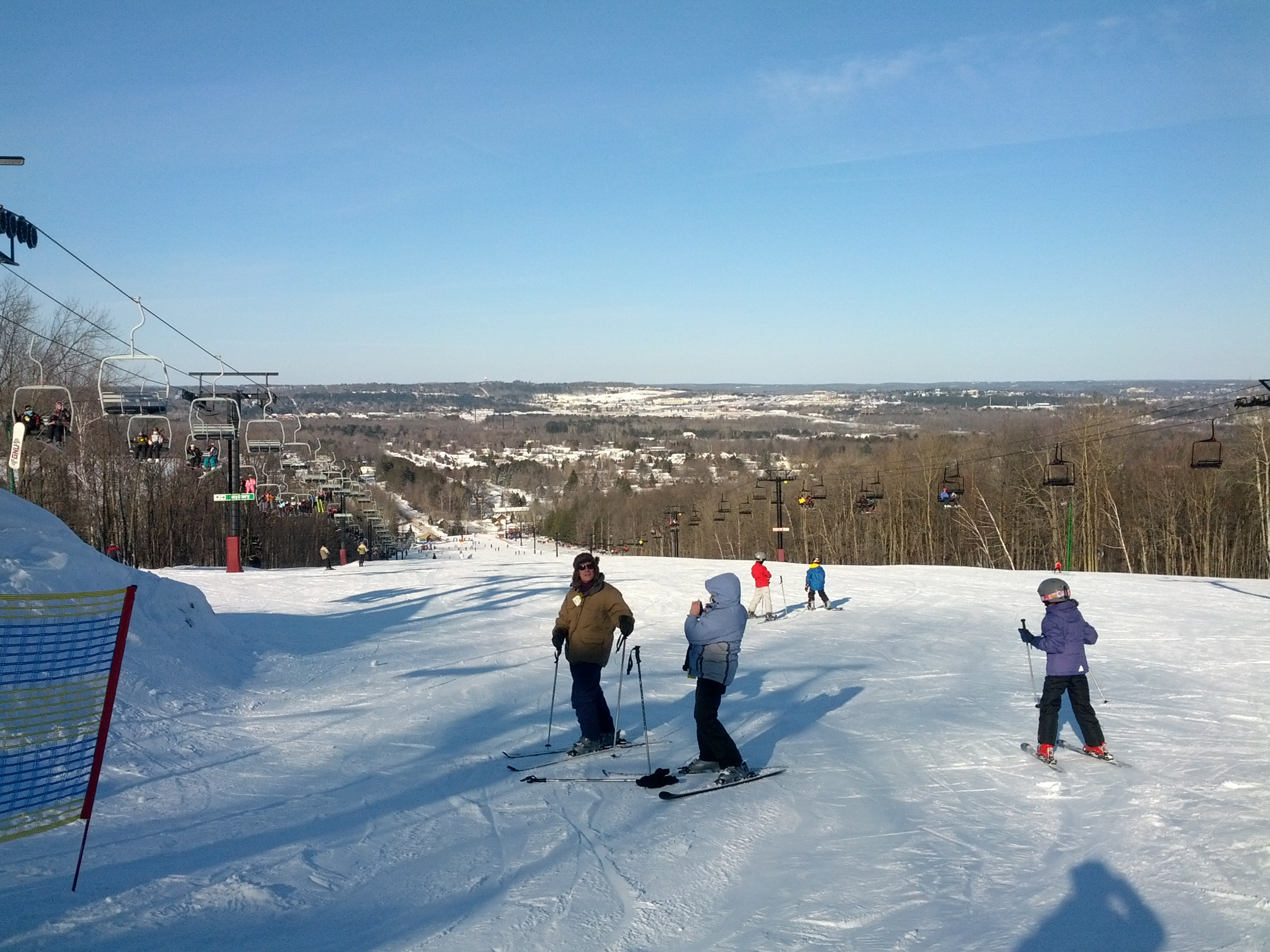
Granite Peak Ski Area

The Wausau Woodchucks baseball team of the Northwoods League, an NCAA summer baseball league, plays home games at the Athletic Park in Wausau. The Wausau Woodchucks were formerly known as the Wisconsin Woodchucks. Woody Woodchuck is their mascot.

The Wausau River Hawks baseball team of the Dairyland League, a Wisconsin Baseball Association summer baseball league, plays home games at Athletic Park in Wausau. The Wausau River Hawks were formerly known as Wausau Precision.

Granite Peak Ski Area offers downhill skiing at nearby Rib Mountain. The 700-ft mountain is Wisconsin's tallest skiable mountain and one of the highest vertical drops in the Midwest. It first became a ski area in 1937, when Wausau residents cleared six runs by hand, installed the nation's longest ski lift, and built a chalet with stone quarried nearby. Granite Peak has 74 runs and seven ski lifts.

Wausau hosts the annual Badger State Winter Games.

Wausau is home to a kayak course that has hosted numerous regional, national, and world competitions over the last two decades. Nine Mile Recreation Area hosts many running, skiing, biking, and other outdoor events each year. The annual 24-hour mountain biking race has served as the USA Cycling 24-Hour Mountain Bike National Championships in past years. Ragnar relay began hosting a trail event at Nine Mile Recreation Area in 2016. Downhill flow machine built mountain bike trails were constructed and opened in 2017 at Sylvan Hill County Park.

Wausau is also home to the Wausau Curling Club, with an eight-sheet ice surface. A new curling facility was finished in 2013, next to the former Holtz-Krause Landfill. It has an Olympic-size ice rink and allows for curling tournaments, national and world championship games.

In the summers local softball teams play at the Sunnyvale Softball Complex, which has five softball fields and two volleyball courts. Men's, Women's, JO, and Slow and Fast pitch are played at the softball complex.

In 2012, Wausau bought the former Holtz-Krause landfill with plans to build a soccer complex. It opened in 2014.

== Parks and recreation ==
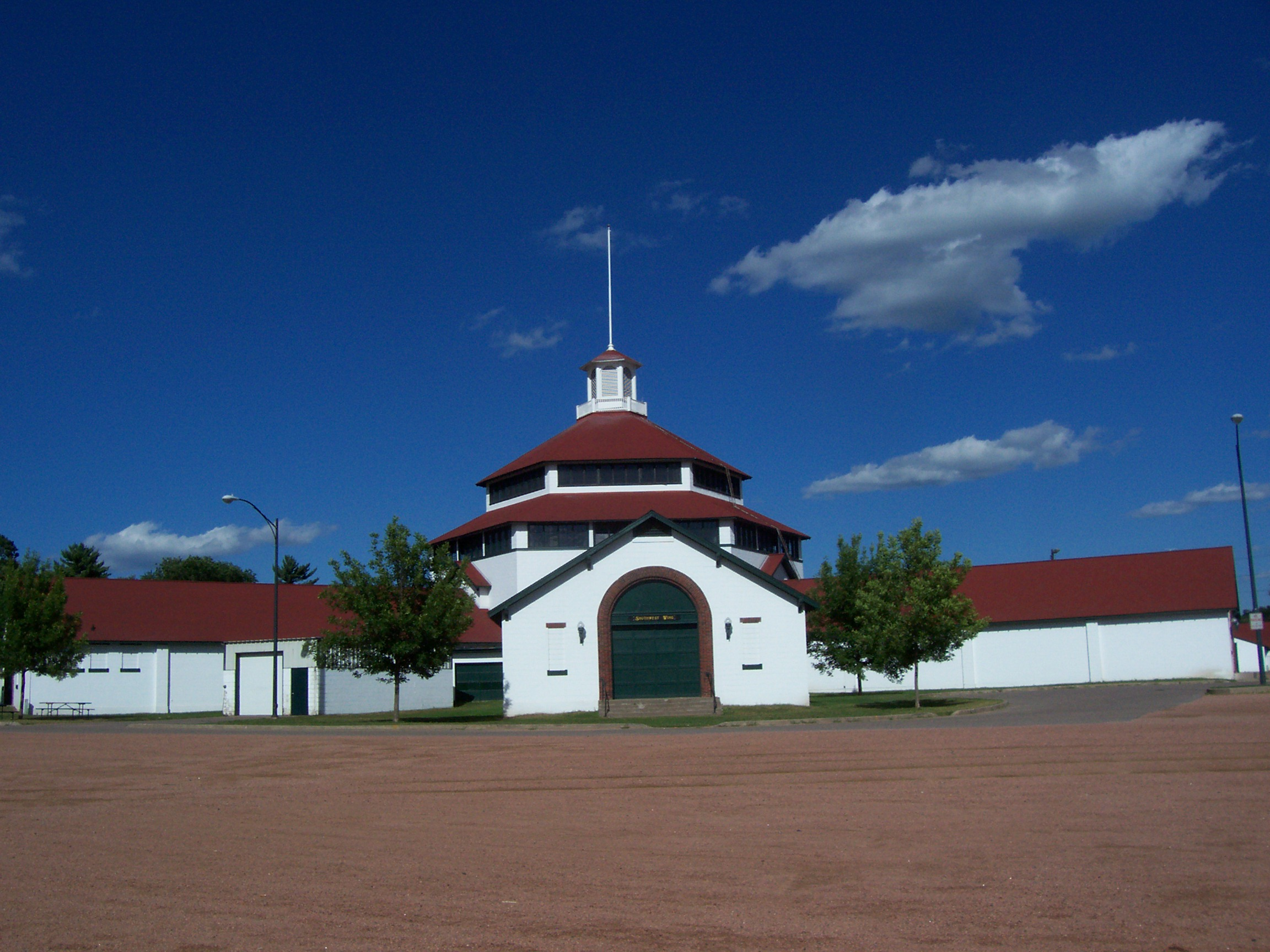
The Marathon County Fairgrounds are listed on the National Register of Historic Places.

The city's 37 city parks, which total 337 acres (136 ha), are maintained by the Wausau and Marathon County Parks, Recreation, and Forestry Department.

Oak Island Community Park and Fern Island Community Park are next to each other on the Wisconsin River. Oak Island has a wide range of activities: tennis courts, two playgrounds, a baseball diamond, one enclosed shelter with a kitchen, two open shelters, and a walking bridge to Fern Island. Fern Island Park hosts the annual Big Bull Falls Blues Festival in August, as well as the annual Beer and Bacon Fest.

Athletic Park, a baseball stadium on Wausau's east side, is home to the Wausau Woodchucks baseball team and Wausau Ignite softball team.

Whitewater Park contains a third of a mile of Class I-II+ rapids along the Wisconsin River in downtown Wausau. It has bleachers facing whitewater rapids where recreational whitewater kayaking and canoeing take place.

Sylvan Hills is a county park in Wausau. During the winter, tubing takes place on hills that have vertical drops of up to 133 feet (41 m).

Marathon Park, another county park in Wausau, hosts the Wisconsin Valley Fair. The park includes camping grounds, two hockey rinks, a curling barn, playgrounds, an obstacle course, an amphitheater, a bandstand, a grandstand, exhibition buildings, a concessions building, and a miniature golf course. Marathon Park contains Wisconsin's southernmost section of old-growth forest. The Little Red School House is in the park.

== Government and politics ==
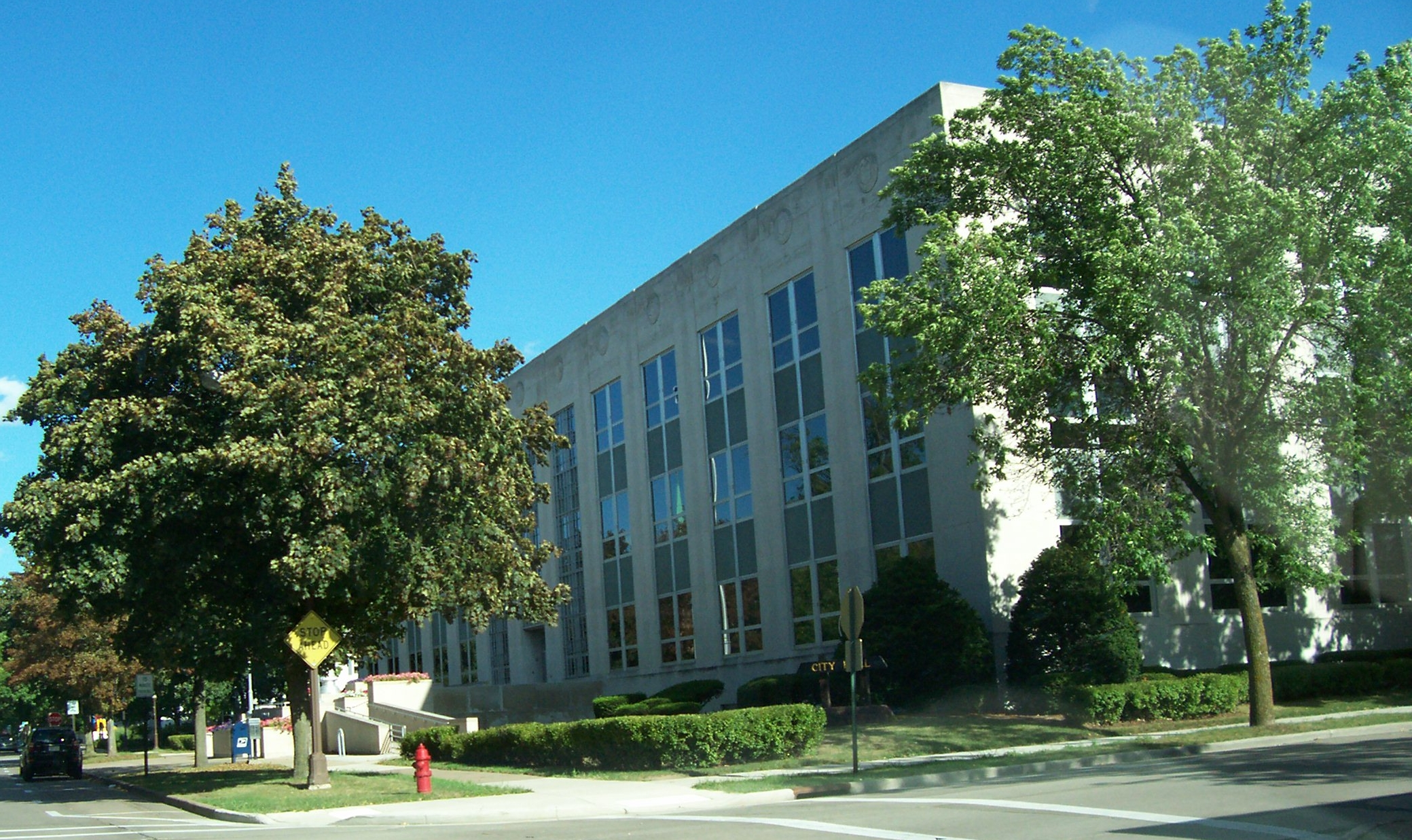
Wausau City Hall

Wausau has a mayor–council form of government. Eleven elected alderpersons make up the city council, each representing one district of the city. The city council manages eight standing committees, including Parks & Recreation, Parking & Traffic, Finance, Human Resources, Public Health & Safety, Economic Development, Coordinating, and Capital Improvement & Street Maintenance.

The mayor of Wausau is Doug Diny, who was sworn in on April 16, 2024. Diny, who served as District 4 Alderperson of Wausau from 2022 to 2024, defeated incumbent mayor Katie Rosenberg in the April 2, 2024, election.

=== Fire department ===
The Wausau Fire Department has 3 stations within the city which contain 5 ambulances, 4 engines, a heavy rescue vehicle, a 100-foot platform truck, rescue boats, inspections vehicles, and command vehicles. The department also has a hazardous incident team, or HIT, which is a type II regional hazardous materials team.

The department employs 72 full-time firefighter/paramedics. It responded to 6,490 calls in 2021.

=== Police department ===
The Wausau Police Department, founded in 1872, is responsible for law enforcement services in the City of Wausau. On average, between 8–12 officers are on patrol at a time. The police department employs 82 sworn officers.

=== Outdoor warning system ===
The city of Wausau, in coordination with the Marathon County Sheriff's Office, is responsible for maintaining 14 outdoor tornado sirens that are strategically placed throughout the city. Sirens are sounded during tornadoes and severe weather. Sirens are tested at 1:15PM every Monday (April–September) and the first Monday of the month (October–March).

== Education ==
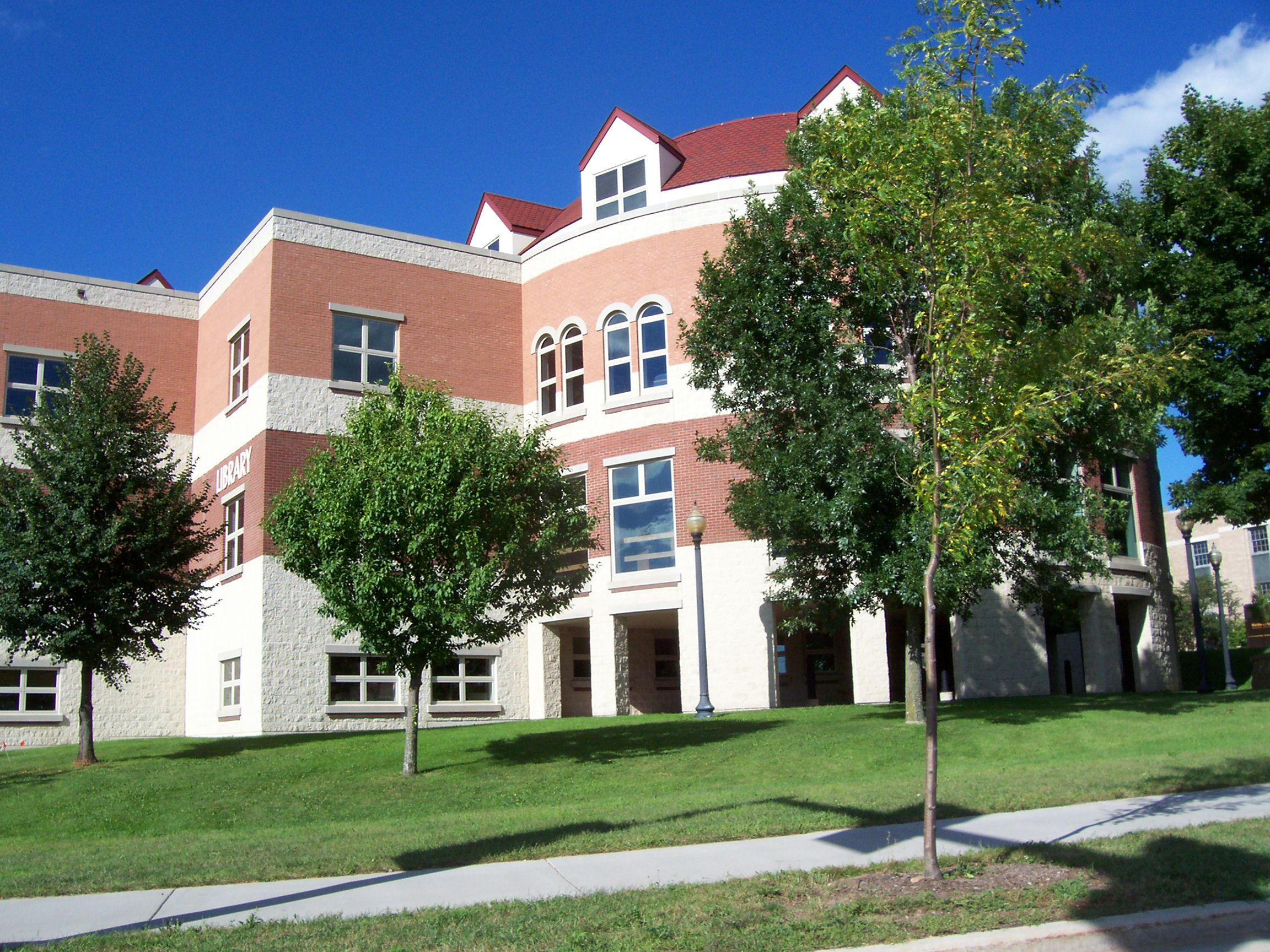
Marathon County Public Library – Wausau Headquarters

=== Primary and secondary ===
Wausau is served by the Wausau School District, which has 14 elementary schools, two middle schools (John Muir and Horace Mann), and two high schools (Wausau East, Wausau West) and two charter schools (Wausau Engineering and Global Leadership Academy and Enrich Excel Achieve Learning Academy). Wausau Engineering and Global Leadership (EGL) Academy is a public charter school housed in Wausau East High School serving grades 9–12 and emphasizing science, technology, engineering and math. D.C. Everest Area School District also serves a large part of the Wausau area. This school district has 7 elementary schools, one middle school, one junior high, and one senior high. They also have a 4K Program.

Wausau Area Montessori Charter School serves grades 1–6 and is housed at Horace Mann Middle School. Two kindergarten classes are available at the Montessori Children's Village and Rib Mountain Montessori. The Excel, Enrich, Achieve (EEA) Learning Academy is a public charter school in the Wausau School District, housed in Wausau East High School, and is for students who do not find the traditional school setting to be a fit for their academic needs. EEA services grades 6–12. The Idea Charter School, a project-based charter school that is a part of the D.C. Everest School District, had its first year in operation in the 2011–2012 school year. The charter school serves grades 6–12.

The city's Roman Catholic parochial schools are known as the Newman Catholic Schools. They include St. Anne, St. Michael and St. Mark, Newman Middle School, and Newman Catholic High School. Other parochial schools include Trinity Lutheran grade school (Lutheran Church–Missouri Synod), Our Savior's Lutheran School (Pre-K–8) (Wisconsin Evangelical Lutheran Synod), Faith Christian Academy (K4–12), a non-denominational Christian school.

=== Colleges and universities ===
Wausau is home to Northcentral Technical College, a two-year technical college, as well as satellite campuses of University of Wisconsin–Stevens Point at Wausau [via NTC Campus], Rasmussen University, and Medical College of Wisconsin.

=== Libraries ===
The Marathon County Public Library (MCPL) – Wausau Headquarters, downtown near the Wausau Center Mall, is the largest library in the Wausau area. It was formed when the county and city libraries merged in 1974. It serves as the headquarters for the Marathon County Public Library system, which encompasses all public libraries in Marathon County, including eight branch libraries. The Marathon County Historical Museum also maintains a library.

== Media ==
The only local daily print newspaper is the Wausau Daily Herald, with a daily circulation of 21,400 during the week and 27,500 on Sunday. Wausau Pilot and Review is a local online newspaper, City Pages is a free weekly newspaper.

TV Stations

WSAW-TV 7/CBS/CW+, WAOW-TV 9/ABC, WJFW-TV 12/NBC, WZAW-LD 33/Fox, WTPX-TV 46/Ion

== Transportation ==
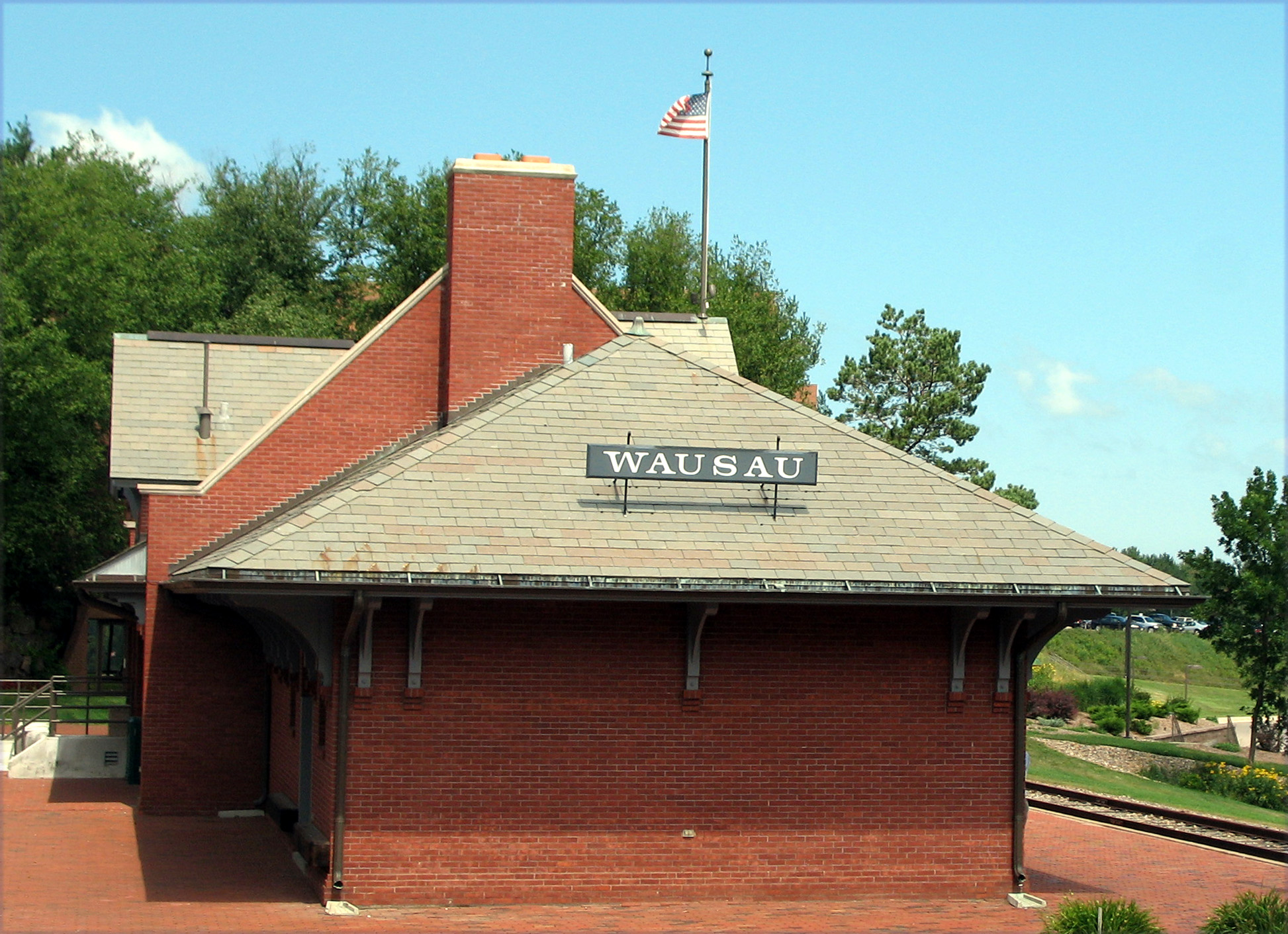
Replica of the downtown Milwaukee Road station on the former campus of Wausau Insurance

=== Airports ===
- AUW – Wausau Downtown Airport serves general aviation aircraft, charter flights, and seaplane operations.
- CWA – Central Wisconsin Airport has commercial flights with American Eagle and Delta Connection.

=== Public transit ===
Metro Ride provides local bus service. For intercity bus service Wausau is served by Lamers Bus Lines providing daily trips from Wausau to Milwaukee via Appleton and Coach USA/Van Galder with a daily trip to Janesville via Madison.

Until 1971, Wausau was served by intercity passenger trains at Wausau station.

=== Roads and highways ===
Major roads in Wausau are Grand Avenue, North 6th St/North 5th St (one-way pair), East and West Bridge St, West Thomas St, 1st Ave/3rd Ave (one-way pair), Stewart Ave, 17th Ave, Merrill Ave, 28th Ave, and East Wausau Ave.

The Wausau street grid is set up with numbered streets on the east side and numbered avenues on the west side. The Wisconsin River divides the city between East and West.

Grand Avenue turns into North 6th Street when traveling north into the downtown area. Business 51 is a major route designation that runs through the city mostly along the original route of US 51 before the freeway bypass was constructed in the 1960s. Entering from the south along Grand Ave, north to downtown then splitting into one-way streets; northbound follows 6th St, McIndoe St, N. 1st St, and Scott St to the Wisconsin River; and southbound from the Wisconsin River along Washington St, 1st St, and Forest St back to Grand Ave. Once on the west side of the river, Scott St becomes Stewart Ave. Business 51 turns north off of Stewart Ave onto the one-way 1st Avenue north to W. Union Avenue westerly for two blocks then north out of town along Merrill Ave (southbound from Merrill Ave along 3rd Avenue, then East on Stewart Ave to the Wisconsin River).

| I-39 travels South to Portage and runs concurrent with I-90 and I-94 after Portage. |
| U.S. 51 Northbound US 51 routes to Woodruff, Wisconsin. Southbound, US 51 routes to Stevens Point. |
| WIS 29 travels east to Green Bay and west to Abbotsford and Chippewa Falls. |
| WIS 52 travels east to Antigo. |

== Notable people ==
- W. W. Albers, Wisconsin State Senator
- John Altenburgh, jazz/blues musician and composer
- Frank E. Bachhuber, lawyer, businessman, and politician
- Chris Bangle, Chief of Design at BMW Auto Group (grew up in Wausau)
- Marcus H. Barnum, Wisconsin State Representative, businessman, and lawyer
- Wayne R. Bassett Sr. (1915–1988), Minnesota state legislator and librarian, Bassett moved to Wausau and was the head librarian of the Marathon County Library
- Matthew Beebe, Wisconsin State Representative and businessman
- Rudy Bell, Major League Baseball player
- William Belter, Wisconsin State Representative
- Warren Bernhardt, jazz, pop, and classical pianist
- Claire B. Bird, Wisconsin state senator
- Jake Blum, North Dakota State Representative
- Gerald J. Boileau, US congressman
- Ronald T. Borchardt, pharmaceutical chemist
- Emil Breitkreutz, Olympic medalist, head coach of the USC Trojans men's basketball team
- Win Brockmeyer, football coach
- Neal Brown, politician, lawyer, businessman and writer
- Rachel Campos-Duffy, American television personality and conservative activist
- John C. Clarke, Wisconsin State Representative
- Gloria Coates, musical composer
- Frank Cramer, Biologist, educator and author
- Lee Crooks, voice actor
- Charles F. Crosby, Minnesota and Wisconsin legislator, lawyer
- Robert W. Dean, Wisconsin jurist and legislator
- Jim DeLisle, NFL player
- Jeff Dellenbach, NFL player for the Miami Dolphins, New England Patriots, Green Bay Packers, and Philadelphia Eagles
- Sean Duffy, 20th United States secretary of transportation
- Henry Ellenbecker, Wisconsin State Representative
- Orville Fehlhaber, Wisconsin State Representative
- Bill Fischer, MLB pitcher and coach
- Ellsworth K. Gaulke, Wisconsin educator, businessman, and politician
- Paul Gebert, Sr., Wisconsin State Representative and businesspeople
- Rod Grams, former member of the United States House of Representatives and senator for Minnesota (as a local news anchor in the late 1970s)
- Dave Heaton, Wisconsin State Representative
- Benjamin W. Heineman, former CEO of Chicago and North Western Railway, founder and CEO of Northwest Industries
- Elroy "Crazy Legs" Hirsch, football player, Pro Football Hall of Fame, University of Wisconsin–Madison Athletic Director 1969–1987 and actor
- Charles Hoeflinger, Wisconsin State Representative
- Michael W. Hoover, Presiding Judge of the Wisconsin Court of Appeals
- Victoria Houston, author
- Jalen Johnson, NBA player for the Atlanta Hawks
- Justin L. Johnson, member of the United States House of Representatives from California (1943–1957)
- William A. Kasten, Wisconsin State Representative
- John Azor Kellogg, U.S. military leader and Wisconsin politician
- William P. Kozlovsky, U.S. Coast Guard admiral
- Edward C. Kretlow, Wisconsin State Representative
- Dave Krieg, football player
- Tony Kubek, baseball player and television broadcaster (lived in Wausau in the 1970s and early 1980s)
- Debi Laszewski, IFBB professional bodybuilder
- John E. Leahy, Wisconsin State Senator
- Liberace, pianist/entertainer (lived and worked in Wausau in the 1950s)
- Greg Liter, NFL player
- Paul A. Luedtke, Wisconsin State Assemblyman
- Barbara K. MacDonald, musician, half of the duo Timbuk 3
- Sue R. Magnuson, Wisconsin State Representative
- Mike Manley, Olympic athlete, Pan American Games gold medalist
- Nicole Manske, host of NASCAR Now and The Speed Report
- Herbert H. Manson, chairman of the Democratic Party of Wisconsin
- Rufus P. Manson, Wisconsin State Representative
- Dave Marcis, retired NASCAR driver
- August F. Marquardt, Wisconsin State Representative
- Herman Marth, Wisconsin State Representative
- Marissa Mayer, CEO of Yahoo!
- Edward F. McClain, Wisconsin State Representative
- Myron Hawley McCord, governor of Arizona Territory
- John McCutcheon, folk music singer
- John L. McEwen, Wisconsin State Representative
- Burton Millard, Wisconsin State Representative
- Henry Miller, Wisconsin State Representative and jurist
- Herman Miller
- Walter D. McIndoe, congressman
- Gerald Morris, author
- Thomas T. Moulton, five-time Academy Award winner in sound recording
- Otto Mueller, politician and businessman
- William H. Mylrea, Wisconsin Attorney General
- Burton Natarus, Chicago City Council member and lawyer
- David Obey, member of the United States House of Representatives from Wisconsin from 1969 to 2011
- Jim Otto, football player, Pro Football Hall of Fame
- Shirley Palesh, baseball player
- Jim Pekol, musician
- B. G. Plumer, legislator and businessman
- Daniel L. Plumer, mayor of Wausau, legislator
- Fred Prehn, Wisconsin State Representative
- Bartholomew Ringle, Wisconsin State Representative
- John Ringle, mayor of Wausau, legislator
- Oscar Ringle, Wisconsin State Representative
- John H. Robinson, mayor of Wausau, legislator
- Sue Rohan, Wisconsin State Representative
- Marvin B. Rosenberry, Chief Justice of the Wisconsin Supreme Court
- Angus B. Rothwell, Superintendent of Public Instruction of Wisconsin
- Johnny Schmitz, baseball player
- Mark Seidl, Wisconsin Court of Appeals judge
- Willis C. Silverthorn, Wisconsin politician
- Leann Slaby, actress, Survivor: Vanuatu contestant
- Brad Soderberg, basketball coach
- Ed Sparr, NFL player
- Michael Stackpole, science fiction author
- Grace Stanke, Miss America 2023
- Alexander Stewart, member of the United States House of Representatives and lumber baron
- Patrick Thomas Stone, United States District Court judge
- Jerome A. Sudut, Medal of Honor recipient
- Ray Szmanda, radio and television personality/spokesperson
- Claude Taugher, Navy Cross and Distinguished Service Cross recipient; NFL player
- Tom Wiesner, Nevada politician and businessman
- Lyman Wellington Thayer, Wisconsin State Senator
- Arthur H. Treutel, Wisconsin State Representative
- Mary Williams Walsh, journalist
- George Werheim, Wisconsin State Representative
- Milt Wilson, professional football player
- Chris Wimmer, NASCAR driver
- Scott Wimmer, NASCAR driver
- Dean Witter, U.S. businessman and founder of Dean Witter & Company investment house
- Cyrus C. Yawkey, businessman
- Charles Zarnke, Wisconsin politician
- Brad Zweck, Wisconsin State Representative
