= John E. Leahy =

American politician

John Egan Leahy was a member of the Wisconsin State Assembly and the Wisconsin State Senate.

== Biography ==
Leahy was born on February 15, 1842, in Dover, New Hampshire. He attended what is now the University of Wisconsin–Madison. During the American Civil War, Leahy served as an officer with the 35th Wisconsin Volunteer Infantry Regiment. On December 31, 1872, he married Mary D. McCrossen. He died on December 23, 1915, and is buried in Wausau, Wisconsin.

== Political career ==
Leahy was elected to the Assembly in 1882 and to the Senate in 1886. Additionally, he was a member of the School Board and City Council, as well as Mayor of Wausau. He was an Independent Democrat and a Republican.

== See also ==
- List of mayors of Wausau, Wisconsin
