= John C. Clarke =

American politician

John C. Clarke was a member of the Wisconsin State Assembly.

== Biography ==
Clarke was born on Anglesey in Wales on February 17, 1831. He died on December 14, 1906.

== Career ==
Clarke was a member of the Assembly in 1882. Previously, he had been Sheriff of Marathon County, Wisconsin; Chairman of the Marathon County Board; a member of the Wausau City Council and Mayor of Wausau. In 1893, Clarke became Postmaster of Somo, Wisconsin. Additionally, he was a Marathon County municipal judge from 1859 to 1892 and a delegate to the 1876 Democratic National Convention.

== See also ==
- List of mayors of Wausau, Wisconsin
