= Rufus P. Manson =

American politician

Rufus P. Manson was a member of the Wisconsin State Assembly.

== Biography ==
Manson was born on February 15, 1830, in Eaton, New Hampshire. In 1854, he married Catherine Nicolls. They would have twelve children. Manson died on February 19, 1897.

== Career ==
Manson was a member of the Assembly from 1871 to 1872. Later, he served as Sheriff of Marathon County, Wisconsin, from 1875 to 1876 and 1881 to 1882 and as Mayor of Wausau, Wisconsin, from 1885 to 1886. He had previously been a clerk of two different courts. Manson was a Democrat.

== See also ==
- List of mayors of Wausau, Wisconsin
