= Daniel L. Plumer =

American politician

Daniel Longfellow Plumer (July 3, 1837 – November 20, 1920) was an American politician and businessman from Wausau, Wisconsin, who was a member of the Wisconsin State Assembly for one year. He was the brother of B. G. Plumer.

== Career ==
Plumer served for some years as Marathon County Surveyor and on the county board of supervisors. He was also on Wausau's Village board.

In 1872, he was elected to the Assembly as a member of the Liberal Reform Party, a short-lived coalition of Democrats, reform and Liberal Republicans, and Grangers.

In 1882, the Silverthorn & Plumer Bank was incorporated as the First National Bank of Wausau, with Plumer remaining president as he had since its organization. He was president of the Northern Chief Iron Company, which owned extensive iron ore mines on the Gogebic Range.

== Death ==
He died in Wausau, Wisconsin, on November 20, 1920, after a long illness.
