= National Register of Historic Places listings in Marathon County, Wisconsin =

Location of Marathon County in Wisconsin

This is a list of the National Register of Historic Places listings in Marathon County, Wisconsin. It is intended to provide a comprehensive listing of entries in the National Register of Historic Places that are located in Marathon County, Wisconsin. The locations of National Register properties for which the latitude and longitude coordinates are included below may be seen in a map.

There are 34 properties and districts listed on the National Register in the county.

This National Park Service list is complete through NPS recent listings posted September 11, 2026.

== Current listings ==
	Name on the Register	Image	Date listed	Location	City or town	Description
1	Andrew Warren Historic District	Andrew Warren Historic District	January 5, 1984 (#84003708)	Roughly bounded by Fulton, Grant, 4th, and 7th Sts. 44°57′48″N 89°37′26″W	Wausau	Andrew Warren owned an early Wausau sawmill and a chunk of land northeast of the downtown which he sold off gradually. 61 properties contribute to the historic district, built from 1868 to 1934 in a variety of styles.
2	C. B. Bird House	C. B. Bird House	May 1, 1980 (#80000155)	522 McIndoe St. 44°57′50″N 89°37′27″W	Wausau	The Claire and Laura Bird house is a Tudor Revival style house designed by Alexander Eschweiler and built in 1910. Claire was a lawyer, judge, and state senator.
3	Dells of the Eau Claire County Park	Dells of the Eau Claire County Park	July 5, 2016 (#16000429)	P2150 Cty. Rd. Y 45°00′10″N 89°19′47″W	Plover	190-acre county park formed in 1924 around a gorge where the Eau Claire River plunges down between outcrops of mylonite. Above, CTH Y crosses the river on a 1927 filled spandrel arch bridge clad in stone. Around the gorge are footpaths and shelters, mostly designed by landscape architect Ingwal Horgen in 1937 and developed by CCC Camp Rib Mountain in the years following.
4	Joseph Dessert Library	Joseph Dessert Library	May 1, 1980 (#80000156)	123 Main St. 44°47′31″N 89°42′03″W	Mosinee	1898 brick Victorian public building designed by Eschweiler. Dessert was a French-Canadian who came to Mosinee in 1844 and operated mills from 1849 to around 1903, producing boards, shingles, lath and pickets.
5	C. F. Dunbar House	C. F. Dunbar House	May 1, 1980 (#80000157)	929 McIndoe St. 44°57′52″N 89°36′56″W	Wausau	Half-timbered neo-Elizabethan home designed by Eschweiler and built in 1929 for the widow of local jeweler, lumberman, and developer Dunbar.
6	East Hill Residential Historic District	East Hill Residential Historic District	April 21, 2004 (#04000360)	Roughly bounded by North Seventh, Adams, North Tenth, Scott and North Bellis Sts. 44°57′50″N 89°37′04″W	Wausau	Large residential district containing homes of prominent citizens overlooking the downtown. The district contains 171 contributing properties in various architectural styles, built from 1883 to 1945.
7	Edgar Village Hall	Edgar Village Hall	March 31, 2000 (#00000317)	107 W. Beech St. 44°55′20″N 89°57′53″W	Edgar	The 1917 brick municipal building is an eclectic design, mixing French Colonial, Italianate, and Classical elements. It housed the village government, fire department, traveling library, and jail, and the auditorium upstairs hosted social events, plays, dances and basketball games.
8	D. C. Everest House	D. C. Everest House	May 1, 1980 (#80000158)	1206 Highland Park Blvd. 44°57′54″N 89°36′45″W	Wausau	English-Spanish Baroque styled home designed by Eschweiler and Eschweiler and built 1925 to 1928. Everest was the general manager of Marathon Paper Mills.
9	First Universalist Church	First Universalist Church	May 1, 1980 (#80000159)	504 Grant St. 44°57′45″N 89°37′29″W	Wausau	1914 Tudor Revival-styled building designed by Eschweiler for the Universalist congregation.
10	Fricke-Menzner House	Fricke-Menzner House	July 16, 1992 (#92000856)	105 Main St. 44°56′01″N 89°51′11″W	Marathon	Italianate home built in 1875 by Henry Fricke, who had built the first successful mill on the Big Rib River. Phillip Menzner was a German immigrant who worked as a lumber scaler for Fricke, married his daughter, and ended up running the mill and a store, and serving as civic leader. The house is now an office of Menzner Hardwoods.
11	Fromm Brothers Fur and Ginseng Farm	Fromm Brothers Fur and Ginseng Farm	November 6, 2013 (#96001581)	436 Co. Hwy. F 45°05′34″N 89°52′47″W	Hamburg	Farm complex from which the four Fromm brothers, starting in 1904, pioneered ginseng farming in central Wisconsin, and used the profits to develop silver fox farming. By 1929 they were the world's largest producer of both.
12	Walter and Mabel Fromm House	Walter and Mabel Fromm House	June 17, 1982 (#82000682)	Off WI 107; 45°05′28″N 89°52′13″W	Hamburg	Eclectic Mediterranean/Spanish Revival house constructed in 1928 for the eldest Fromm brother.
13	Highland Park Historic District	Highland Park Historic District	October 17, 2022 (#100008274)	Generally bounded by Hamilton, Franklin, North 10th, and North 14th Sts. 44°57′54″N 89°36′47″W	Wausau	Neighborhood of boulevards with 40 houses in various styles, including the 1927 Prairie Style Highland Park Investment House, the 1929 Tudor Revival-style Thom house, the 1929 French Provincial-style Kreutzer house, the 1940 Spanish Colonial Revival Hubbard house, the 1951 Contemporary-style Tinkham house, the 1951 Wrightian Fulmer house, many '50s Ranch-style homes, the 1955 International-style Yawkey-Woodson house, and the 1974 Colonial Revival-style Kraft house.
14	Granville D. Jones House	Granville D. Jones House	December 7, 1977 (#77000036)	915 Grant St. 44°57′43″N 89°37′01″W	Wausau	1904 Prairie School house initially designed by Maher. Jones was an educator, lawyer, and land baron. He was also a founder of Employers Mutual Life Insurance, now Wausau Insurance.
15	Hotel Wausau	Hotel Wausau	April 26, 2021 (#100006405)	221 Scott St. 44°57′39″N 89°37′43″W	Wausau	8-story commercial hotel designed in Classical Revival style by Holabird & Roche of Chicago and built in 1925, with eight retail stores at street level and 257 guest rooms above, aimed at travelers of all social classes.
16	Maine Site (47MR22)		July 19, 1984 (#84003711)	Address Restricted	Brokaw	A boundary increase was approved July 19, 2024.
17	Charles L. and Dorothy Manson House	Charles L. and Dorothy Manson House	April 5, 2016 (#16000149)	1224 Highland Park Blvd. 44°57′59″N 89°36′42″W	Wausau	Wright's fourth Usonian home, built 1939-41 and adapted for a sloping lot. Charles owned a local insurance company.
18	Marathon County Fairgrounds	Marathon County Fairgrounds	May 1, 1980 (#80000160)	Stewart Ave. 44°57′23″N 89°38′56″W	Wausau	Stock-judging pavilion and cattle barns designed by Eschweiler and constructed in 1921.
19	Marathon Shoe Company East Side Plant	Marathon Shoe Company East Side Plant	January 12, 2017 (#100000574)	1418 N. 1st St. 44°58′06″N 89°37′46″W	Wausau	2-story stucco-clad shoe factory built in 1923, a representative of the shoe industry that became important to the local economy when paper-milling slowed.
20	Louis Marchetti House	Louis Marchetti House	March 7, 1996 (#96000240)	921 Grand Ave. 44°56′55″N 89°37′18″W	Wausau	1878 home in Second Empire style. Marchetti immigrated from Austria around 1867, worked in the lumber industry, studied law, became lawyer, judge and mayor of Wausau, and wrote the 1913 History of Marathon County.
21	Karl Mathie House	Karl Mathie House	May 1, 1980 (#80000161)	202 Water St. 44°47′33″N 89°41′51″W	Mosinee	1912 Shingle style house along the Wisconsin River, designed by Eschweiler. Mathie was a clergyman, educator, and the first president of Wausau Sulphate Fiber Co. (later Wausau Paper), which revived Mosinee's economy after Dessert's sawmill closed. Later purchased by musician John Altenburgh.
22	Henry Miller House	Henry Miller House	June 14, 1982 (#82000683)	1314 Grand Ave. 44°56′40″N 89°37′14″W	Wausau	Queen Anne house with polygonal turret and Eastlake-style bargeboards, built in 1894 by John Drisko. Later owned by Henry Miller, a state representative and respected county judge. This house is a survivor of many grand homes which once stood along Grand Avenue.
23	Rothschild Pavilion	Rothschild Pavilion	June 27, 2002 (#02000708)	1104 Park St. 44°53′55″N 89°36′59″W	Rothschild	Rustic stone dance hall on the Wisconsin River, constructed in 1911 with railroad car springs under the dance floor.
24	Schofield School	Schofield School	March 24, 2015 (#15000108)	1310 S. Grand Ave. 44°54′46″N 89°36′45″W	Schofield	3-story brick elementary school designed by Oppenhamer and Obel in Collegiate Gothic style and built in 1923.
25	E.K. Schuetz House	E.K. Schuetz House	May 1, 1980 (#80000162)	930 Franklin St. 44°57′48″N 89°36′56″W	Wausau	1922 Colonial Revival home designed by Eschweiler. Schuetz was a jeweler.
26	Benjamin Single House	Benjamin Single House	November 24, 1980 (#80000163)	West of Wausau at 4708 Stettin Dr. 44°57′37″N 89°41′46″W	Wausau	1849 high-style Greek Revival home. Single immigrated from England and built a sawmill on the Little Rib River in the 1840s - one of the first in Marathon County.
27	Hiram C. Stewart House	Hiram C. Stewart House	August 30, 1974 (#74000097)	521 Grant St. 44°57′43″N 89°37′26″W	Wausau	George W. Maher designed this 1906 Prairie School/Arts and Crafts home with tulip motifs for Stewart, a partner in the Barker-Stewart Lumber Company. Now the Stewart Inn.
28	United States Post Office and Court House	United States Post Office and Court House	May 2, 2012 (#12000294)	317 1st St. 44°57′34″N 89°37′49″W	Wausau	Federal building designed by Wausau architects Oppenhamer & Obel in Art Deco style and built 1937-38. Housed the post office, the federal circuit court, and agencies like the FBI and IRS. The lobby features a logging mural painted by Gerrit Van Sinclair. Now apartments.
29	Wausau Club	Wausau Club	September 14, 1989 (#89001420)	309 McClellan St. 44°57′40″N 89°37′37″W	Wausau	Neoclassical men's club built 1901-02 by ten leaders of the time. Closed 2005.
30	C. H. Wegner House	C. H. Wegner House	May 1, 1980 (#80000164)	906 Grant St. 44°57′44″N 89°37′02″W	Wausau	Charles and Emma Wegner had this Colonial Revival home designed by Eschweiler and built 1922-24. Wegner ran a general store downtown. Still has breakfast nook and built-in cupboards and ice box.
31	Duey and Julia Wright House	Duey and Julia Wright House	July 16, 1999 (#99000787)	904 Grand Ave. 44°56′57″N 89°37′23″W	Wausau	One of Frank Lloyd Wright's last Usonian houses, built in 1958 on a bluff above the Wisconsin. Frank designed the house with musical motifs for Duey and Julia, who owned a music store and school.
32	Ely Wright House	Ely Wright House	March 1, 1982 (#82000684)	901 6th St. 44°57′51″N 89°37′23″W	Wausau	Wright, the founder of Wausau Iron Works, had this Italianate home built in 1881.
33	Cyrus C. Yawkey House	Cyrus C. Yawkey House	December 31, 1974 (#74000098)	403 McIndoe St. 44°57′49″N 89°37′35″W	Wausau	Classical Revival house built around 1901 and expanded around 1908. Yawkey was a lumberman, helped organize Marathon Paper Mills, and helped lead several other local companies, as well as being a philanthropist. The building now houses the Marathon County Historical Museum.
34	Zion Lutheran Church	Zion Lutheran Church	April 11, 2024 (#100010206)	709 North 6th Street; 44°57′45″N 89°37′23″W	Wausau	Late Gothic Revival-style stone-clad Lutheran church with cruciform floor-plan, designed by Frank A. Abrahamson of Minneapolis and built in 1953, with stained glass windows by Erhardt Stoettner of T. C. Esser Company.

== See also ==
- List of National Historic Landmarks in Wisconsin
- National Register of Historic Places listings in Wisconsin
- Listings in neighboring counties: Clark, Langlade, Lincoln, Portage, Shawano, Taylor, Waupaca, Wood
