= Charles L. Manson House =

House in Wausau, Wisconsin

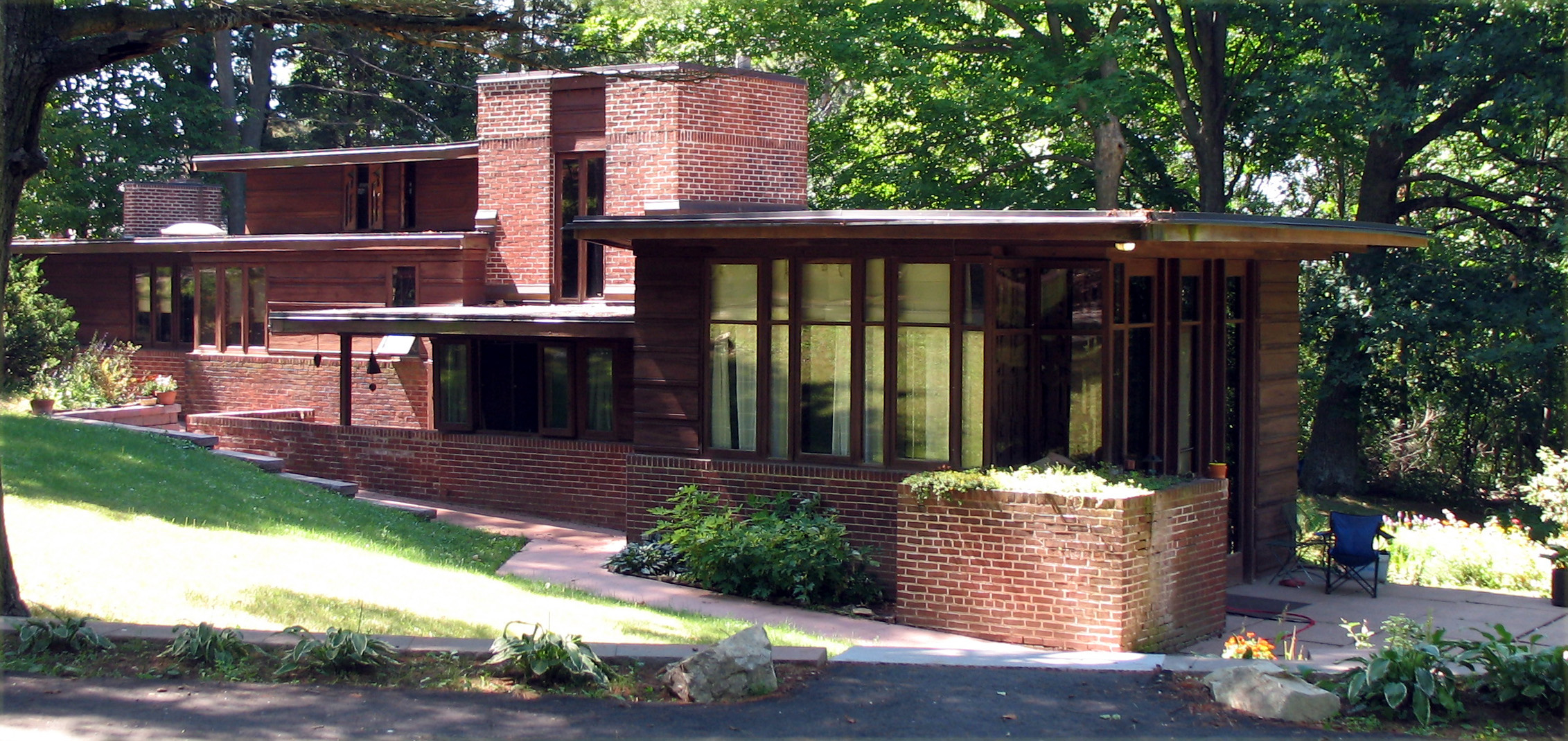

- Location within Wisconsin Location within the United States

General information
- Type: House
- Architectural style: Usonian
- Location: Wausau, Wisconsin
- Coordinates: 44°57′59″N 89°36′41″W
- Construction started: 1938–1941

Technical details
- Floor area: 2,462 sq ft (228.7 m^{2})

Design and construction
- Architect: Frank Lloyd Wright

The Charles L. and Dorothy Manson home is a single-family house located at 1224 Highland Park Boulevard in Wausau, Wisconsin. Designated a National Historic Landmark, it was listed on the National Register of Historic Places on April 5, 2016, reference Number, 16000149.

Designed by the American architect Frank Lloyd Wright and built between 1938 and 1941, it is one of Wright's earliest Usonian designs and the first of only two Wright homes in Wausau. The other home, the Duey and Julia Wright House is also a Usonian home. The design and construction of these homes provide significant examples of Wright's Usonian vision. Both are listed as Historical Landmarks for the City of Wausau.

== The Usonian vision ==
Wright's concept of Usonian homes involved low-cost homes that embraced the natural landscape in both function and design. As inherently organic structures, these homes would provide a space for developing an individual's unique personhood through the freedom of creativity and expression.

== Design and construction ==
Charles "Fritz" and his wife Dorothy were inspired by the Herbert and Katherine Jacobs First House, in Madison, Wisconsin, United States which is one of the first Usonian homes. They contacted Wright and requested that he build their home on a hillside lot which was ideal for the organic architecture design.

Prior to his role at his family's insurance business in Wausau, Fritz had experience as a journalist and photographer. While the house was being built, he used these skills to document the various phases of the construction process. Wright was not present during the construction; his secretary Eugene "Gene" Masselink managed the house's construction and completion. Bennie Dombar, a protégé of Wright's, also participated in the building process, later applying architectural concepts from the Manson home to the design of his own home in Cincinnati, Ohio.

Typical of Usonians, the walls are sandwich compositions of plywood and tidewater red cypress board and batten trimmed with local red (Ringle) brick. To protect the house against fierce winters, Wright sandwiched two extra layers into the walls. The house sits on a concrete slab with its back to the street.

The home uses a square unit or modular system to reduce costs, but aesthetically introduces 30 and 60 degree angles to eliminate right angle corners. The strong horizontal line created by the house descending three levels down the sloping wooded lot mimics the silhouette of Wright's Prairie School houses.

At the front entrance, a high ceiling, gallery hallway and carved panels create visual interest. These elements extend to the outside to integrate the insight and outside.

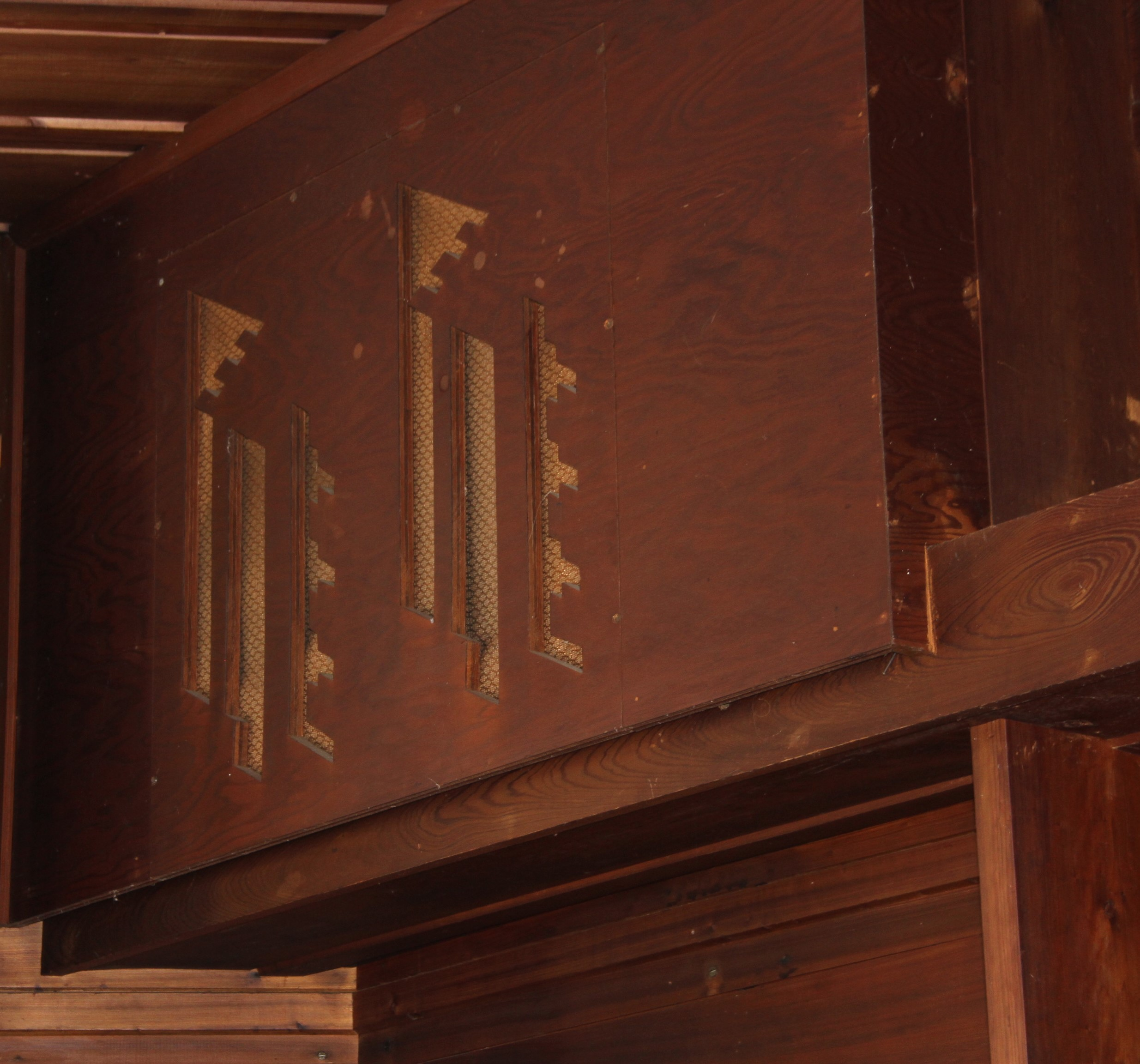
Frank Lloyd Wright Carved Panels Manson Home Wausau Wisconsin USA

Throughout the 4 bedroom and 3 bathroom home, the continuity of indoor and outdoor spaces is achieved through the lack of boundaries. One room flows into the next, just as the exterior of the home was built to flow from within the natural landscape. The intentional lack of boundaries creates rooms that can be large and open while still containing intimate areas. What someone might call a "hallway" another may refer to as the "family room" or a "reading nook."

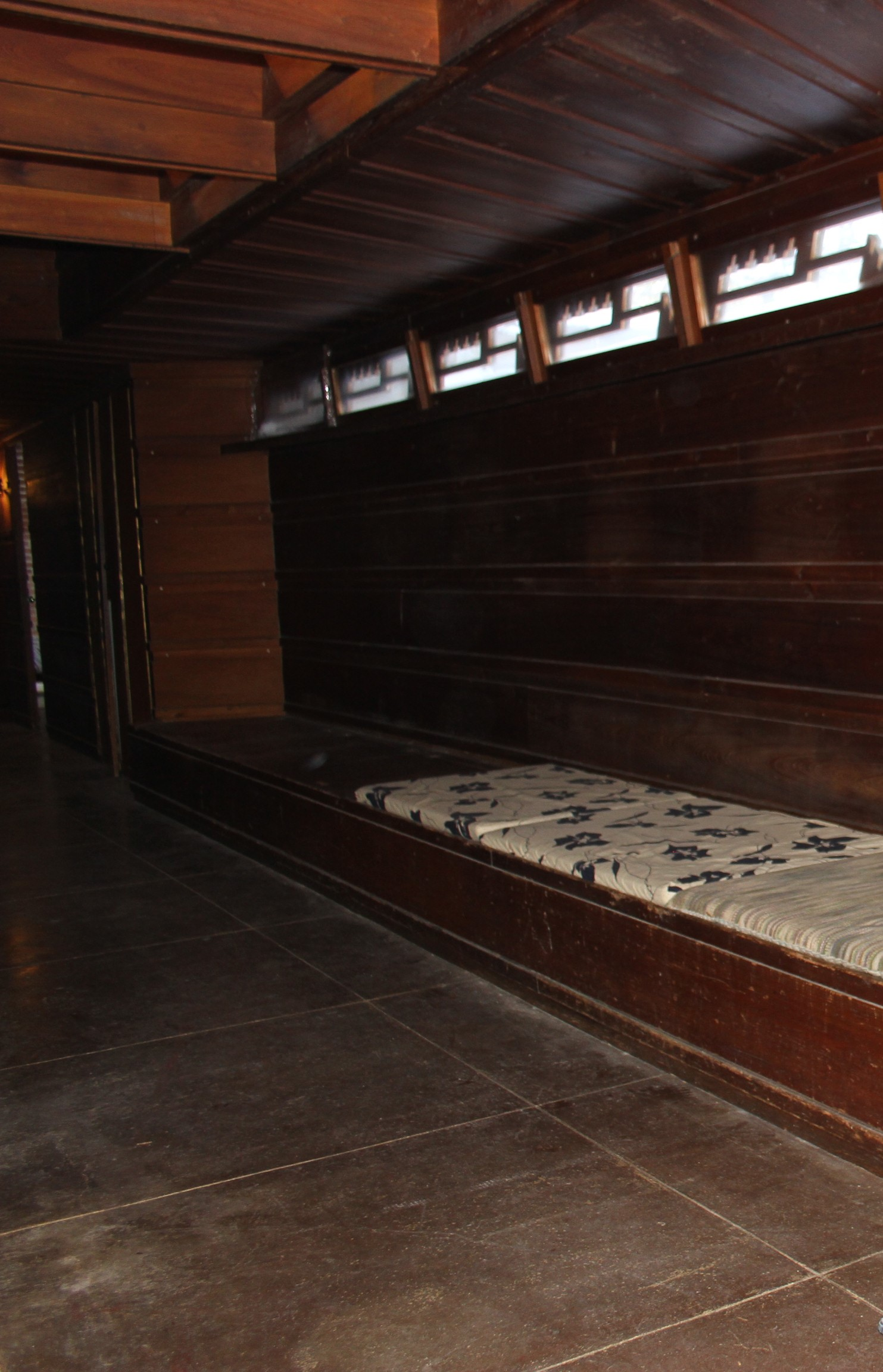
Frank Lloyd Wright Carved Panels and Hallway Manson Home Wausau Wisconsin USA

Common to many Wright homes, there are carved wood panels that filter natural light, as well as built-in bookshelves, window seating, and tables.

This concept of continuity is most evident in the living room space that is anchored by an asymmetrically designed fireplace which is typically the core of the Usonian house. Creating a sense of interest, the fireplace is visually appealing from all angles and it would be difficult to define exactly where the front of the fireplace is indeed located. Its placement is similar to the fireplace located in the "pink loggia" at Taliesin, the summer home of Wright near Spring Green, Wisconsin. A multi-planed design, it extends naturally from the stairs and maintains a statesman presence in the room. So, it is not surprising that both the Manson daughters were married in front of this fireplace.

Wright felt that flat planes created barriers which suggested confinement and containment, so he consciously sought to reduce them whenever doing so would not distract from the overall design. Towards this goal, the integration of brick, wood, and concrete was utilized to form a nearly fluid space which aligned with the goal of organic architecture that sought to blend the inside with the outside.

For Wright, the beauty of a design was intangible and its meaning could be found between the lines within the continuity of the flow. So while bricks are common building materials, in Wright's application they were not common in their effect. For instance, the fireplace had only horizontal mortar lines visible between the bricks; the vertical lines had been painted the same color as the bricks to create a sense of natural flow. Contributing to the multi-dimensional design, the firebox and hearth were both positioned at floor-level with no definitive boundaries.

Varied ceiling heights overhead provided a sense of spaciousness and the natural light visible from the hallway and streaming in from the floor to ceiling windows across the living room provided ever-changing contrasts and shadows.

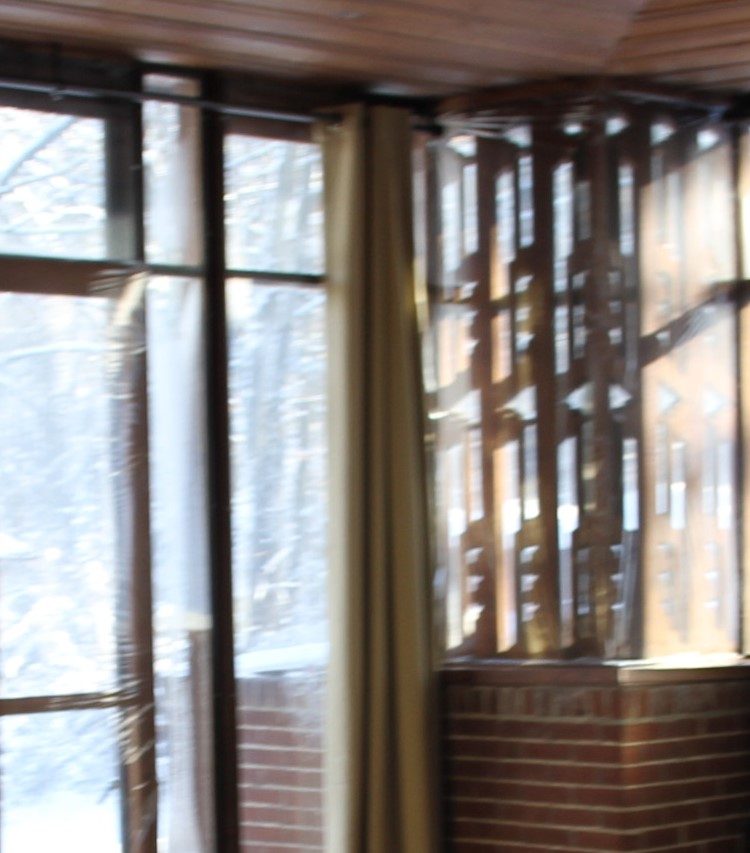
Frank Lloyd Wright Carved Panels and Windows Manson Home Wausau Wisconsin USA

The home was designed with hot water pipes in the concrete floor for heating which proved problematic in the long term because repairing and replacing them involved great expense and effort. As a result, future owners of the home installed alternate heating systems.

Through his unique application of basic materials, Wright transformed the environment by building connections to other rooms through natural elements, indirect lighting and open flowing spaces. Wright's intention was to release the "expected" containment of boxy rooms and rigid architecture so that all spaces were connected and interwoven.

Understanding the importance of connections, the Manson's had simple decorative accents throughout their home. As a shared interest with Wright, the Manson home displayed Japanese prints, a folding mini-partition, Asian vases and a hearth rug with Asian symbols. Fritz and Dorothy also shared a connection with Wright as Unitarians which may have influenced not only their introduction to Wright, but their appreciation for organic architecture as well as their longtime friendship after the home was completed.

== Significance ==
The Manson's home is an early example of Usonian design and a significant milestone for Wright's work because it served as a proof of concept. Effectively, this home helped refine the standards of Usonian design with a flat roof, architectural elements that blend both the inside and outside, and the structural integration into the natural environment. Applying this design, Wright's Usonian vision of a cooperative utopian community was achieved in 1945. Located in the Town of Mount Pleasant, adjacent to the village of Pleasantville, Westchester County, New York this community of Usonian homes is now a designated national historic district.

== See also ==
- List of Frank Lloyd Wright works
