= E.K. (disambiguation) =

E.K. may refer to:

- E.K. Nyame, a Ghanaian musician.
- E.K. Nayanar, Former Chief minister of Kerala.
- E.K. Hornbeck, an American play about the Scopes trial.
- E.K. Smith, a Confederate States Army general.
- E.K. Schuetz House, a historic house in Wisconsin.
