= Bank of Hartland =

- U.S. National Register of Historic Places
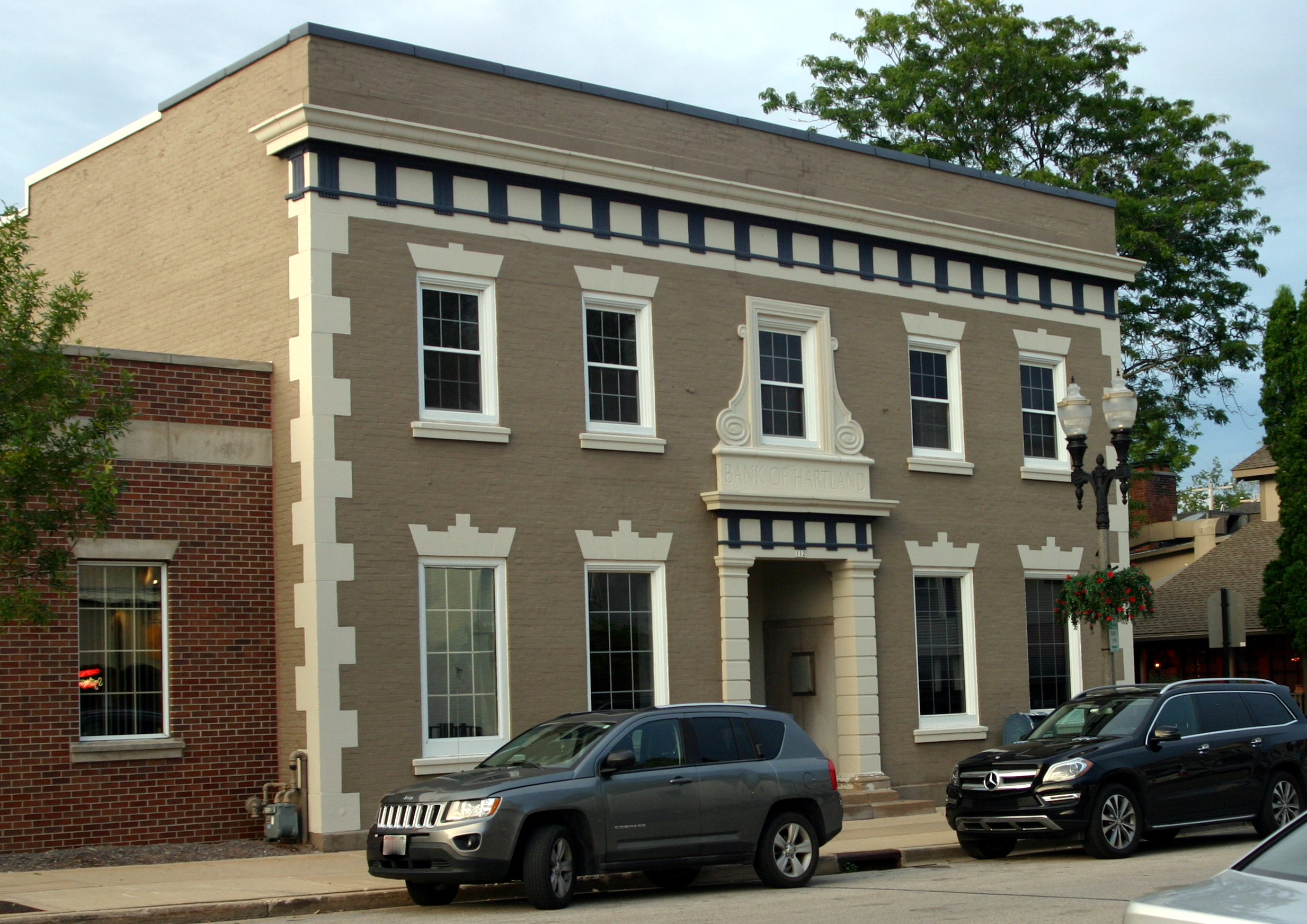

- Location within Wisconsin Location within the United States
- Location: 112 E. Capitol Dr., Hartland, Wisconsin
- Coordinates: 43°6′17″N 88°20′49″W
- Area: less than one acre
- Built: 1894; 1930
- Architect: Eschweiler & Eschweiler, et al.
- Architectural style: Georgian Revival
- MPS: Hartland MRA
- NRHP reference No.: 86003415
- Added to NRHP: April 21, 1988

The Bank of Hartland, at 112 E. Capitol Dr. in Hartland, Wisconsin, United States, was originally built in 1894. It was remodeled and expanded in 1930 to design by architects Eschweiler & Eschweiler. It was listed on the National Register of Historic Places in 1988.

The bank, Hartland's first, was opened by George Frisbie in 1894, and it was bought by H.W. Goodwin in 1895. It was a private bank, until it was incorporated in and chartered as a state bank in 1903, the first bank to do so. The bank was prosperous; 1930 was its most successful year.

It is the best and only example of Georgian Revival architecture in Hartland. It has prominent quoins. It has also been known as Suburban State Bank.
