= Wadham's Oil and Grease Company of Milwaukee =

- Wadham's Gas Station
- U.S. National Register of Historic Places
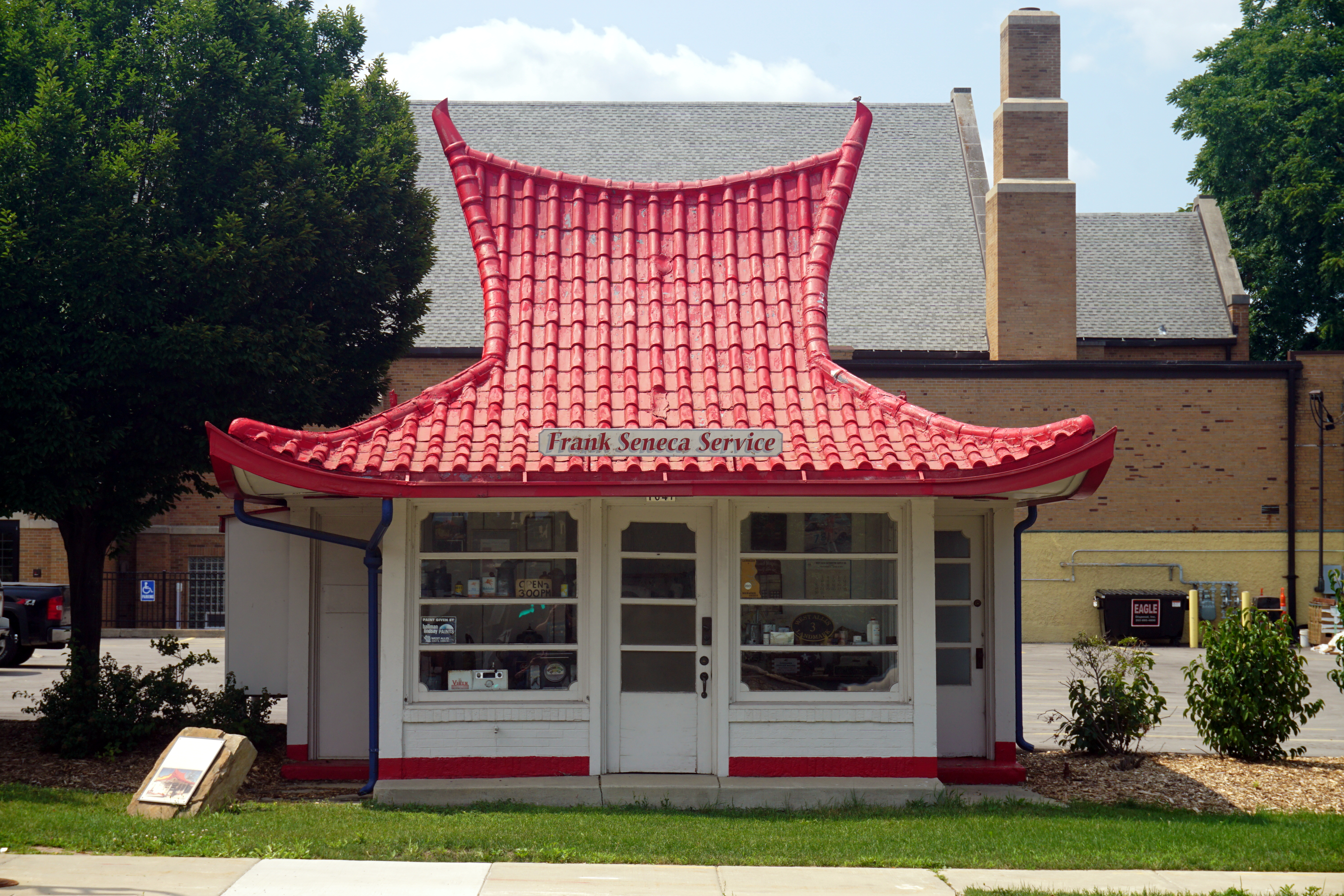

- Location within Wisconsin
- Location: West Allis, Wisconsin
- Coordinates: 43°0′43″N 88°0′27″W
- Area: less than one acre
- Built: 1927
- Architect: Alexander C. Eschweiler
- Architectural style: Japonist
- NRHP reference No.: 04000849
- Added to NRHP: August 11, 2004

Wadham's Oil and Grease Company of Milwaukee was a chain of filling and service stations that operated in the early 20th century and was headquartered in Milwaukee, Wisconsin. The company's refinery was in Indiana. The company was headed by Harger W. Dodge, who assumed leadership from his father-in-law in 1916. Dodge saw the potential in offering a convenient way for automobile owners to fill their cars with gasoline. He built off-street filling stations with underground tanks for the gasoline and electric pumps to dispense it. Wadham's was purchased by Vacuum Oil Company in 1930. Vacuum Oil was then acquired by Socony, which later became Mobil.

== Pagoda service stations ==
Early gas stations were small, ugly or utilitarian buildings that attracted little notice and even complaints from neighbors. Dodge hired Milwaukee architect Alexander C. Eschweiler to design eye-catching stations. Inspired by Japanese culture, which was popular at the turn of the century, he created Wadham's signature pagoda. As well as a prime example of Japonism, the design was one of the earlier examples of architecture forging a brand identity.

Each building was unique, having a different roofline and floor plan. The pagoda-style roofs were made of stamped-metal tiles. Atop the gabled red roofs many stations had cupolas - often multi-tiered - with lanterns hanging from the corners. The walls were black with yellow trim around the copious glass. They most often featured large plate glass windows on the front, and multi-pane windows covering the sides. Wadham's built over 100 of these distinctive pagodas between 1917 and 1930.

Few of these stations remain. One, built in 1927, was in use as a gas station until 1978. Restored in 2000, it is on the National Register of Historic Places and is maintained as a museum display by the city of West Allis. Another, built in 1926, is part of the Washington Avenue Historic District in Cedarburg and is in use as a jewelry store.

== See also ==
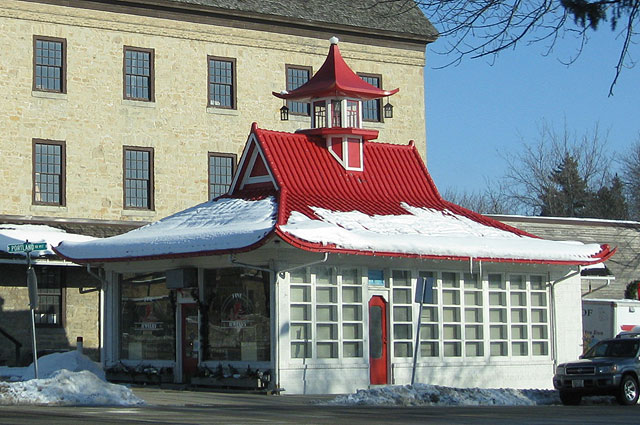
One of the few surviving Wadham's pagodas, in Cedarburg, Wisconsin

- Fantastic architecture
- Gas pump
