= Charles Allis Art Museum =

- Charles Allis House
- U.S. National Register of Historic Places
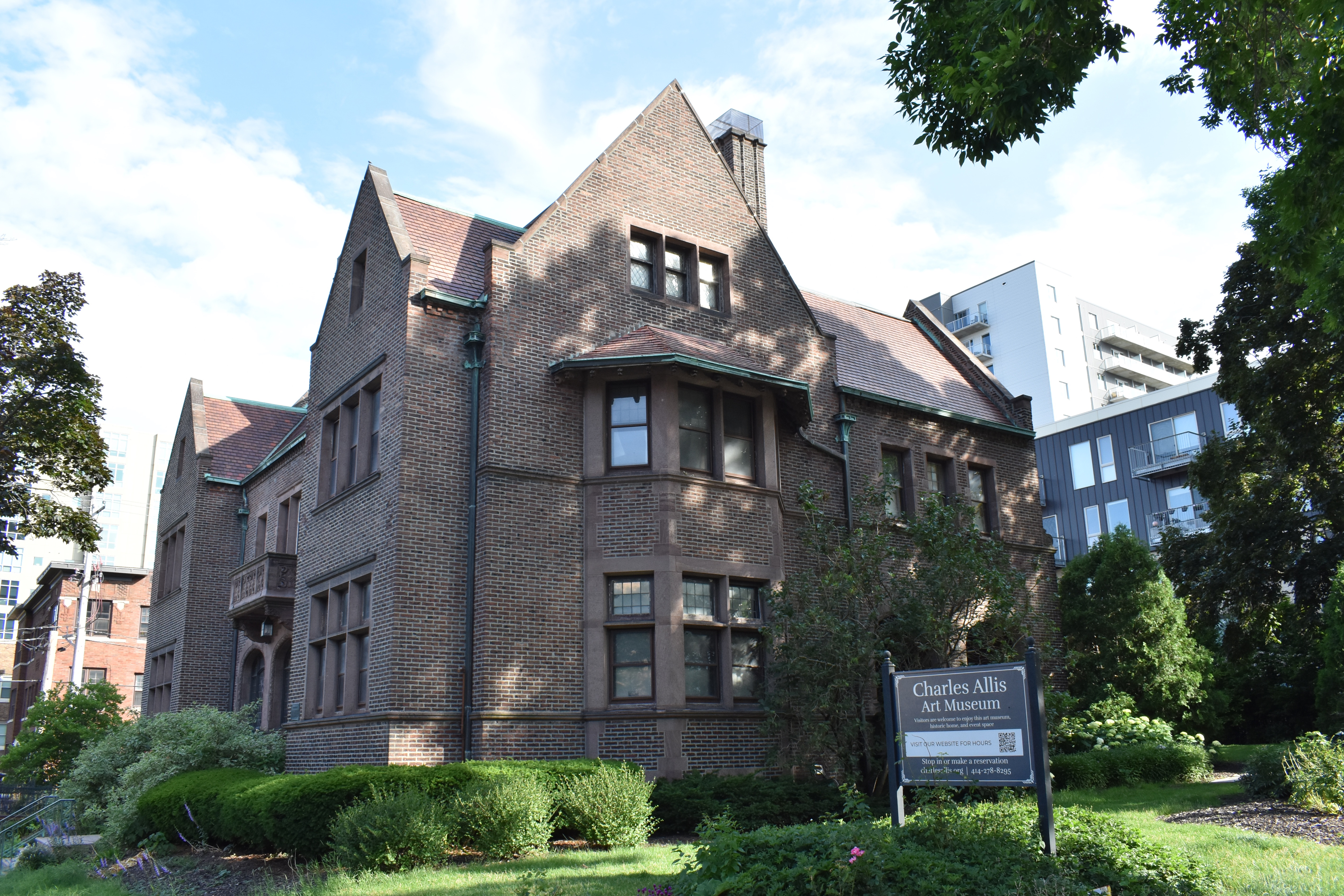
- National Registered Historic Place
- Interactive fullscreen map
- Location: 1630 E Royall Pl, Milwaukee, Wisconsin
- Coordinates: 43°03′13″N 87°53′25″W
- Built: 1909
- Architect: Alexander Eschweiler
- Architectural style: Tudor Revival
- NRHP reference No.: 75000072
- Added to NRHP: January 17, 1975

The Charles Allis Art Museum is a museum in Milwaukee, Wisconsin. It is listed on the National Register of Historic Places as the Charles Allis House.

== Allis Mansion history ==
The Charles Allis Art Museum was originally the home of Milwaukee native Charles Allis and his wife, Sarah. Charles, the son of Edward P. Allis, was the first president of the Allis-Chalmers Corporation. Charles and Sarah Ball were married in 1877. Both were very active in the Milwaukee community. He was one of the organizers of the Milwaukee Arts Society, a trustee at the Layton Art Gallery and was on the boards of many other arts and business institutions.

The year he died, 1918, Charles was serving as chairman of the Milwaukee County Council of Defense. Both he and his wife were patrons of the arts and were responsible for many acts of charity beyond the world of art.

The couple assembled an art collection and planned to bequeath their mansion and its contents for public education and enjoyment. Built in 1911 in the Tudor Revival style, the mansion features a Tudor rose motif throughout its interior and exterior.

The Museum began its life as an Art Library and was a part of the Milwaukee County Public Library System from 1957 to 1978.

In 1979, the Allis Mansion was turned over to Milwaukee County, and was designated an Art Museum from that time forward. Treasures can be found throughout the Charles Allis Art Museum. It contains a collection of paintings, prints, sculptures, ceramics and more. It is largely intact with original furnishings and a rich and diverse art collection spanning nearly 2,000 years beginning with ancient glass objects blown in 1 B.C. and ending with the painters of Charles Allis' day.

To complement this collection, the Allis holds several changing exhibitions each year, which feature works by Wisconsin artists.

== Allis architecture ==
The Charles Allis Mansion is an early work of Boston-born architect Alexander Eschweiler.

Work began on the house in 1909 and was completed in 1911. It was one of the first private homes in Milwaukee to have electricity. The walls are largely made of concrete to keep Charles and Sarah's art collection safe from the ever-present threat of fire.

The exterior of the house is largely mauve Ohio brick and is trimmed with Lake Superior sandstone. The interiors are tastefully done in lavish materials, as was the style at the time. There is Circassian walnut paneling in the French Parlor room, and embossed and polychromed Lincrusta Walton wallpaper in many rooms on the first floor.

In addition to the hand-carved marble fireplaces that grace nearly every room, there are many types of fine marble used throughout the house, such as Florido Creme, Tavernelle Clair and Haueville Fleuri for the Marble Hall.

== Local arts ==
The Charles Allis Art Museum is a center for Wisconsin artists and sponsors changing exhibitions featuring Wisconsin artists. The Allis emphasizes fine art, drawing, painting, photography, printmaking and sculpture.

In addition to the visual arts the Allis displays, it holds a free seasonal music series, Allis After Hours. The third Thursday of the month throughout the spring, summer and fall, the Allis holds a jazz concert in the English Garden or Margaret Rahill Great Hall. The musicians featured are Milwaukee artists, in accordance with the Allis's mission to showcase Wisconsin talent.

The Charles Allis Art Museum, along with the Villa Terrace Decorative Arts Museum, is part of the Milwaukee County War Memorial Corporation.

== Selected collection highlights ==
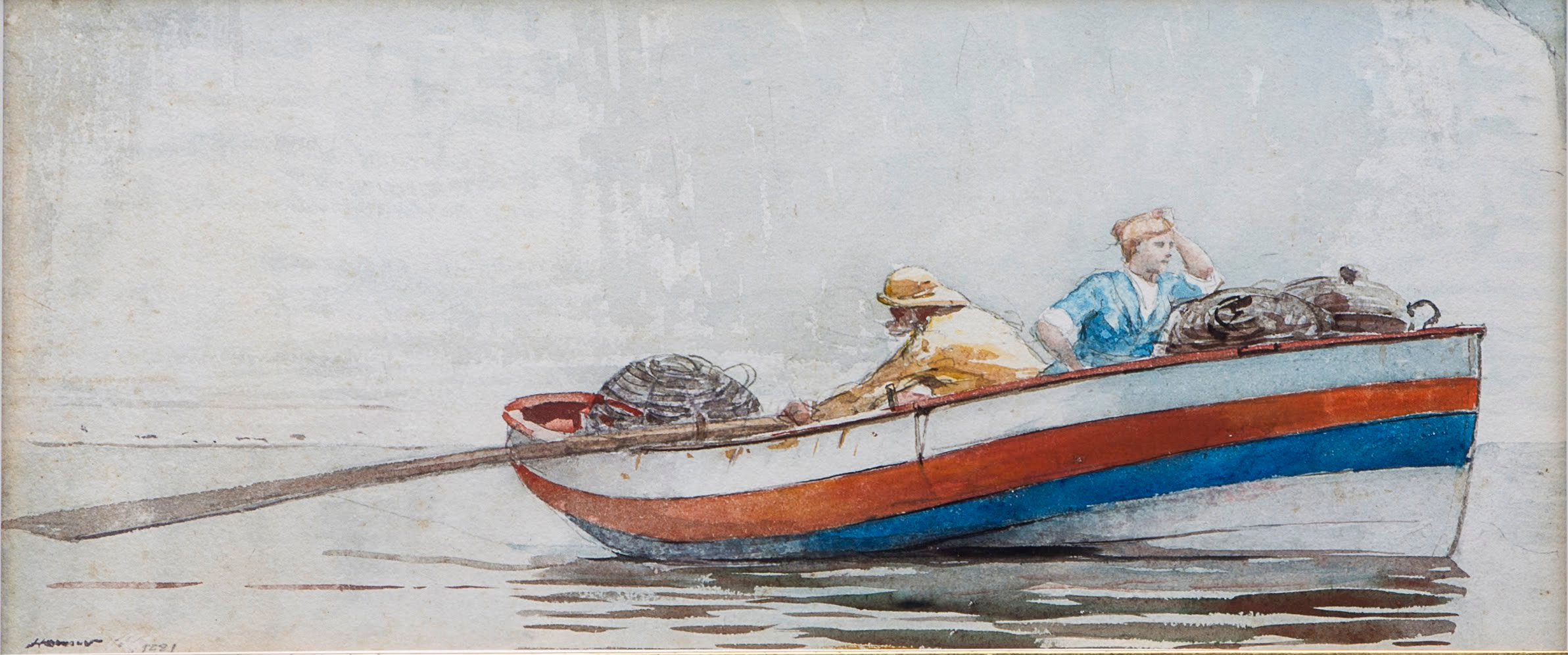
Winslow Homer
