= Harold Hornburg House =

Historic house in Wisconsin, United States

- U.S. National Register of Historic Places
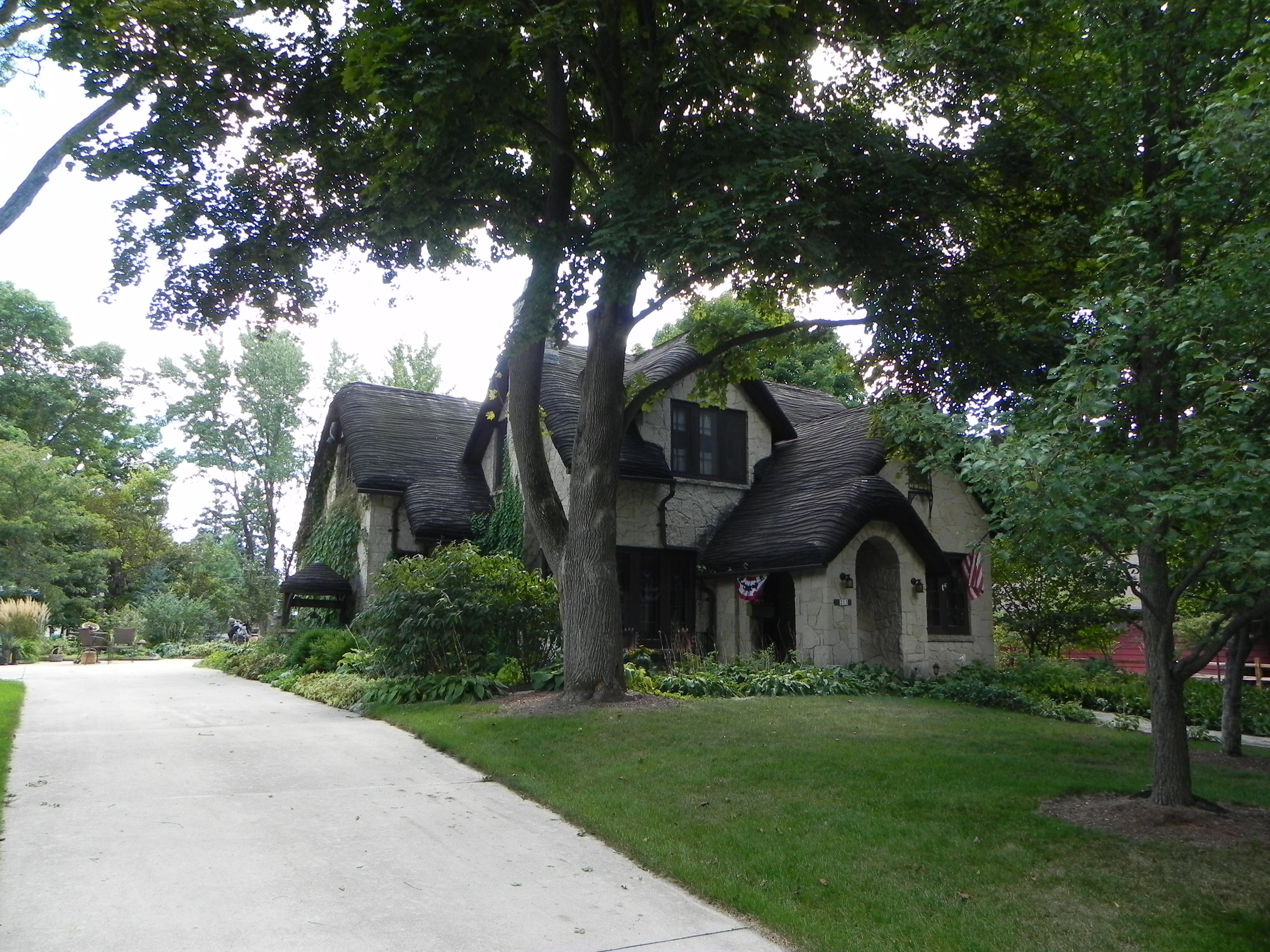
- Harold Hornburg House
- Location: 213 Warren Ave., Hartland, Wisconsin
- Coordinates: 43°06′12″N 88°20′38″W
- Area: less than one acre
- Built: 1928
- Architect: Alexander C. Eschweiler/Harold Brockmeyer
- Architectural style: Tudor Revival
- MPS: Hartland MRA
- NRHP reference No.: 86003431
- Added to NRHP: December 8, 1986

The Harold Hornburg House in Hartland, Wisconsin is a home designed by Eschweiler & Eschweiler to suggest an English cottage with a thatched roof, built in 1928. The house was listed on the National Register of Historic Places in 1986 and on the State Register of Historic Places in 1989.

== History ==
Harold Hornburg was a long-time dealer of Ford vehicles. His 1.5-story home's walls are veneered with lannon stone. The rolled eaves suggest a thatched roof, but are clad with modern shingles. Hornburg and the contractor Harold Brockmeyer visited a house in Oshkosh with a similar roof and based the roof design on that. Along with the eaves, the low-to-the-ground profile of the house with no raised basement contributes to the impression of a Cotswold cottage.
