= Milwaukee County School of Agriculture and Domestic Economy Historic District =

- U.S. National Register of Historic Places
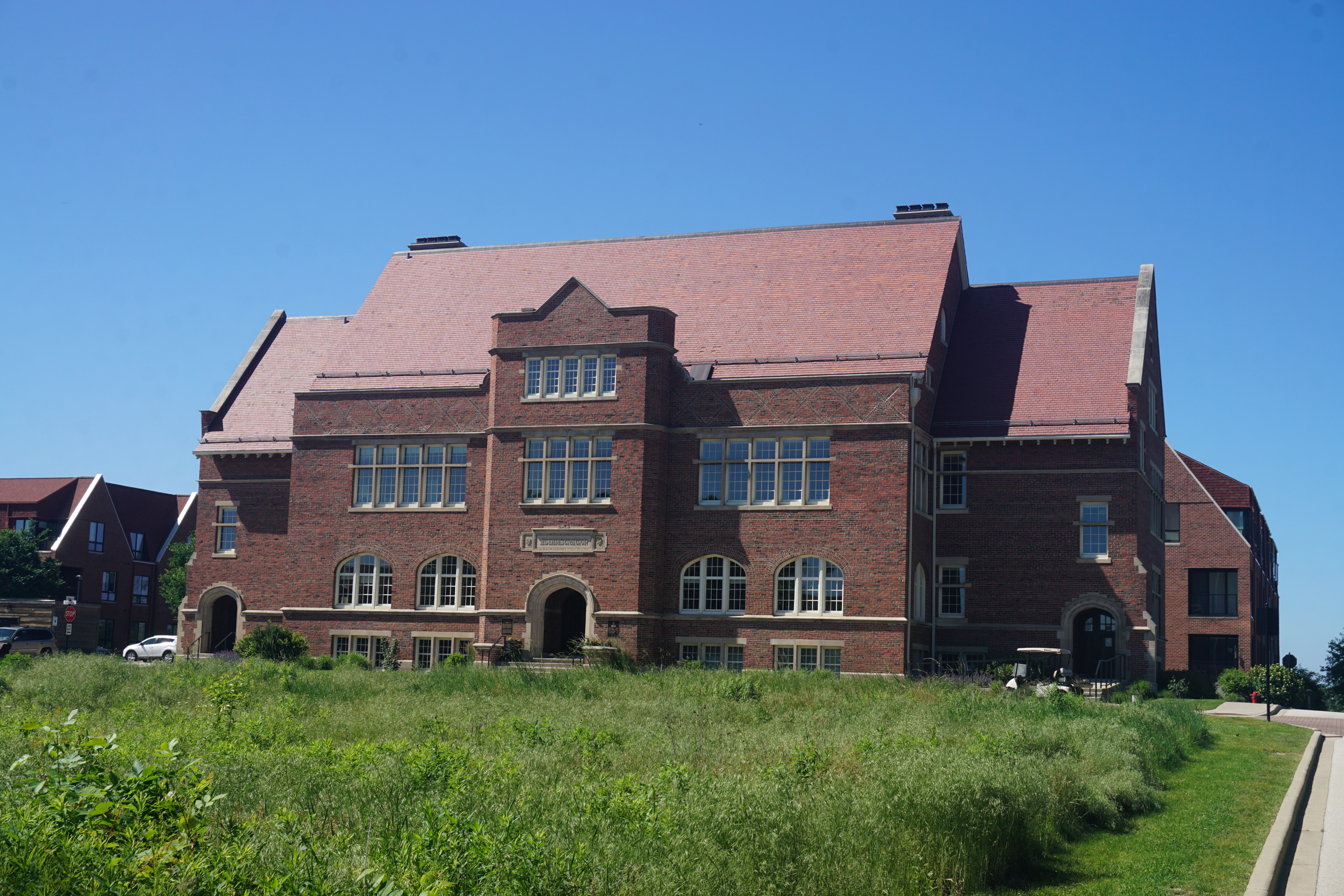
- The Administration building.
- Location: 9722 Watertown Plank Rd., Wauwatosa, Wisconsin
- Area: 6 acres (2.4 ha)
- Architect: Alexander C. Eschweiler
- Architectural style: Tudor Revival
- NRHP reference No.: 98000258
- Added to NRHP: March 19, 1998

The Milwaukee County School of Agriculture and Domestic Economy Historic District is the building complex of an agriculture school started in 1912 in Wauwatosa, Wisconsin, when farming was a big part of Milwaukee County's economy. In 1998 the complex was listed on the National Register of Historic Places.

== History ==
The district was a high school campus from 1912 to 1928, aiming to train young farmers, rather than have them quit school after 6th grade. It was the third such agriculture-focused high school in the state, following similar schools in Dunn and Marathon counties, and it was probably the largest.

Alexander C. Eschweiler designed its buildings. There are five buildings, all with walls of red brick:

- The 1911 University building is 1.5 stories, Tudor Revival style, with bargeboards.
- The 1911 Class Building is 1.5 stories, in Tudor Revival style, decorated with bargeboards.
- The 1911 Administration building is 2.5 stories, Collegiate Gothic style.
- The 1911 Dairy Building is 2.5 stories, with bay windows and exposed rafter tails.
- The 1911 Horticulture building was 1.5 stories, in a mix of Collegiate Gothic and Tudor Revival styles. It was demolished in 1995.
