= Claire B. Bird =

20th century American politician and judge

The Honorable Claire B. Bird
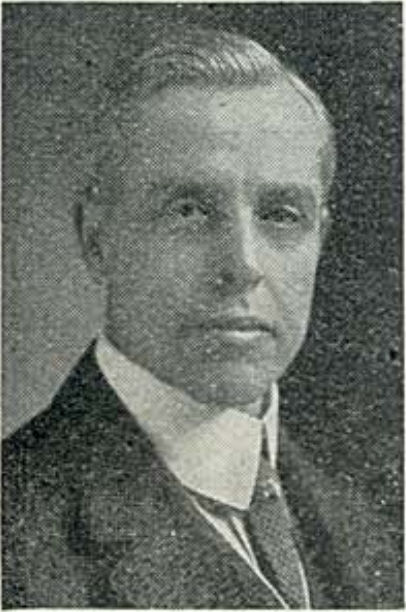
- 1919 Blue Book portrait

Wisconsin Circuit Court Judge for the 16th Circuit
- In office September 1941 – June 1, 1942
- Appointed by: Julius P. Heil
- Preceded by: George J. Leicht
- Succeeded by: Gerald J. Boileau

Member of the Wisconsin Senate from the 25th district
- In office January 1, 1919 – January 1, 1923
- Preceded by: W. W. Albers
- Succeeded by: Joseph L. Barber

Personal details
- Born: Claire Brayton Bird; October 27, 1868 Jefferson, Wisconsin
- Died: August 15, 1954 (aged 85) Madison, Wisconsin
- Resting place: Pine Grove Cemetery; Wausau, Wisconsin
- Party: Republican
- Spouses: Laura Myrau Eaton; (died 1936)
- Parents: George W. Bird (father); Louise (Brayton) Bird (mother)
- Education: University of Wisconsin; University of Wisconsin Law School

Claire Brayton Bird (October 27, 1868 – August 15, 1954) was an American lawyer from Wausau who served four years as a Republican member of the Wisconsin State Senate from the 25th District (Langlade and Marathon Counties).

== Early life and education ==
Bird was born on October 27, 1868, in Jefferson, Wisconsin. He graduated from Wayland Academy in Beaver Dam, Wisconsin, the University of Wisconsin, and the University of Wisconsin Law School.

== Career ==
Bird began practicing law in Wausau, Wisconsin. He was appointed city attorney of Wausau in 1897 and served two years; was vice-president of the Wisconsin State Board of Education from 1917 to 1918, resigning when elected to the Senate; and served as president of the Wisconsin State Bar Association.

== Political career ==
Bird was elected a member of the Senate in 1918, with 5,056 votes to 3,794 for Socialist Christ Bloom.

== Personal life ==
He married Laura Eaton (1868–1936) in 1892.

Bird's former home, now known as the C. B. Bird House, is listed on the National Register of Historic Places.

Political offices
Preceded by W. W. Albers	Member of the Wisconsin Senate from the 25th district 1919 – 1923	Succeeded by Joseph L. Barber
Legal offices
Preceded by George J. Leicht	Wisconsin Circuit Court Judge for the 16th Circuit; 1941 – 1942	Succeeded by Gerald J. Boileau
