= C. B. Bird House =

Historic house in Wisconsin, United States

- U.S. National Register of Historic Places
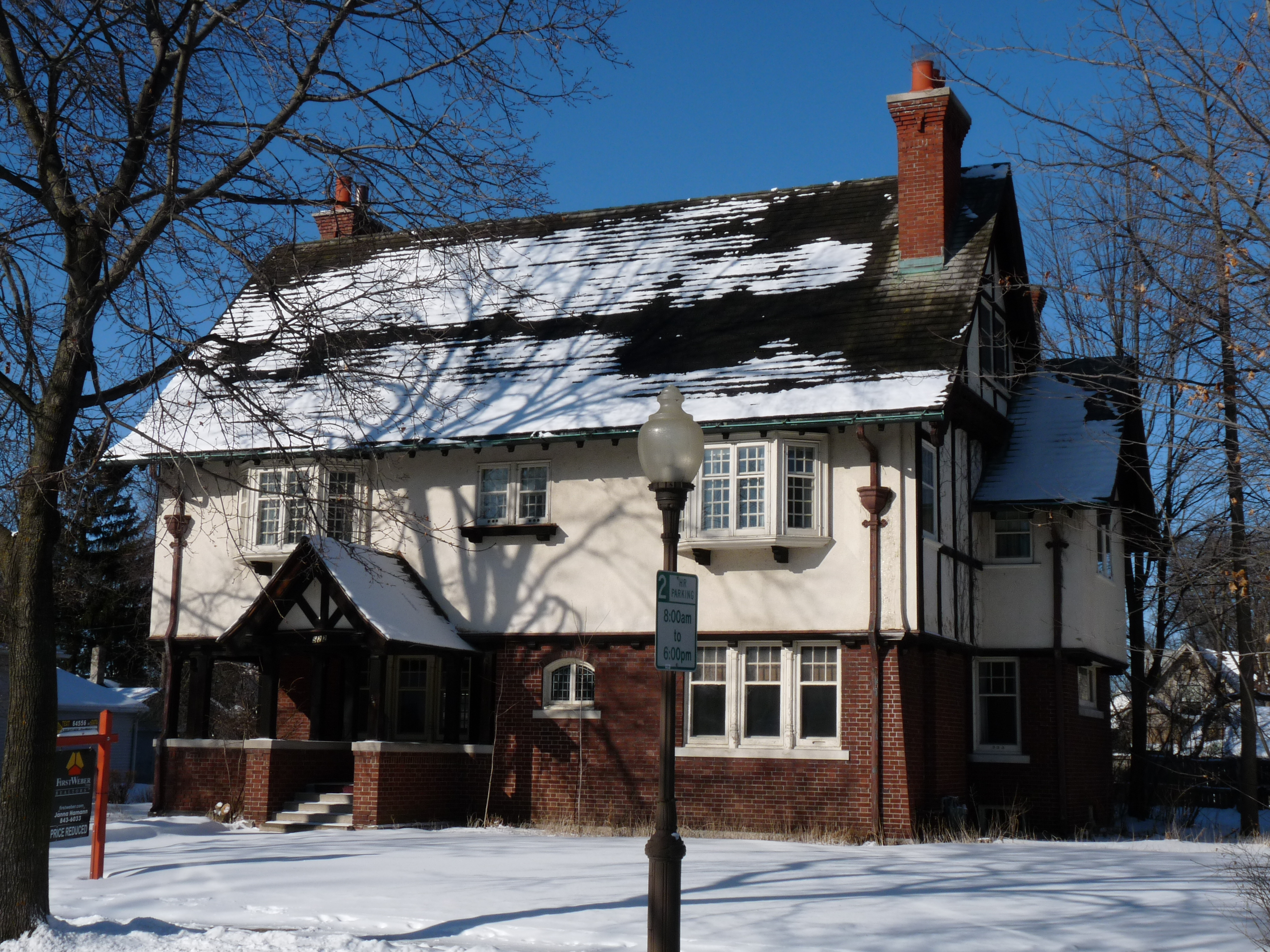

- Location within Wisconsin Location within the United States
- Location: 522 McIndoe St. Wausau, Wisconsin
- Coordinates: 44°57′51″N 89°37′26″W
- Area: 0.157 acres (0.064 ha)
- Built: 1922
- Architect: Alexander C. Eschweiler
- Architectural style: Tudor Revival
- NRHP reference No.: 80000155
- Added to NRHP: May 1, 1980

The C. B. Bird House is a Tudor Revival house built in 1922 and located in Wausau, Wisconsin. It was added to the National Register of Historic Places on May 1, 1980.

== Description and history ==
The house was designed by Alexander C. Eschweiler, and originally belonged to Claire B. Bird. Bird, a prominent attorney, once argued a case in front of the Supreme Court of the United States. He was also president of the Wisconsin Bar Association from 1913 to 1914 and became a member of the Wisconsin State Senate from 1918 to 1923.
