= Marathon County Fairgrounds =

- U.S. National Register of Historic Places
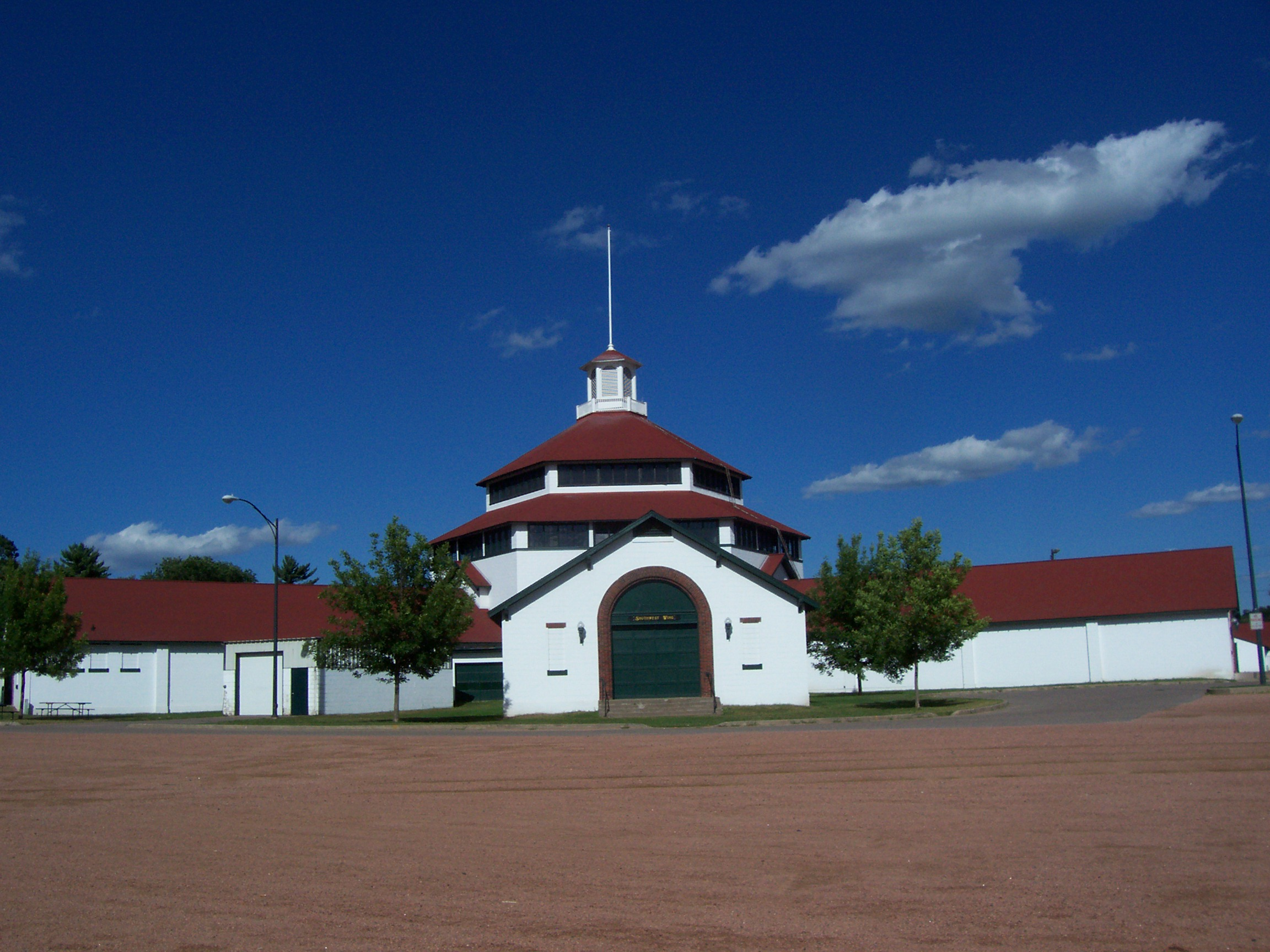
- Marathon County Fairgrounds
- Location: Stewart Ave. Wausau, Wisconsin
- Coordinates: 44.9567°N 89.64728°W
- NRHP reference No.: 80000160
- Added to NRHP: May 1, 1980

The Marathon County Fairgrounds are located in Wausau, Wisconsin. In 1980, the site was added to the National Register of Historic Places.

== History ==
The county fair, now known as the Wisconsin Valley Fair, has been held at the site since 1868. It features a stock judging pavilion (pictured) that was designed by Alexander C. Eschweiler and built in 1921. Other features on the site include a carousel, a kids' train, a curling club and campgrounds.
