= W. W. Albers =

American politician and businessman

William W. "W.W." Albers (May 20, 1860 – January 31, 1951) was an American politician and businessman.

Born in New Holstein, Wisconsin, Albers went to Lawrence University and University of Wisconsin–Madison. He worked in a pharmaceutical business in Chicago, Illinois and graduated from the Chicago College of Pharmacy in 1884. He then moved to Wausau, Wisconsin and open several pharmacies. Albers served on the Wausau Common Council, the Marathon County, Wisconsin Board of Supervisors, and the Wausau School Board. Albers served in the Wisconsin State Senate as a Democrat from 1911 to 1919. He retired in Fort Lauderdale, Florida and died there in 1951.
