= Ely Wright House =

Historic house in Wisconsin, United States

- U.S. National Register of Historic Places
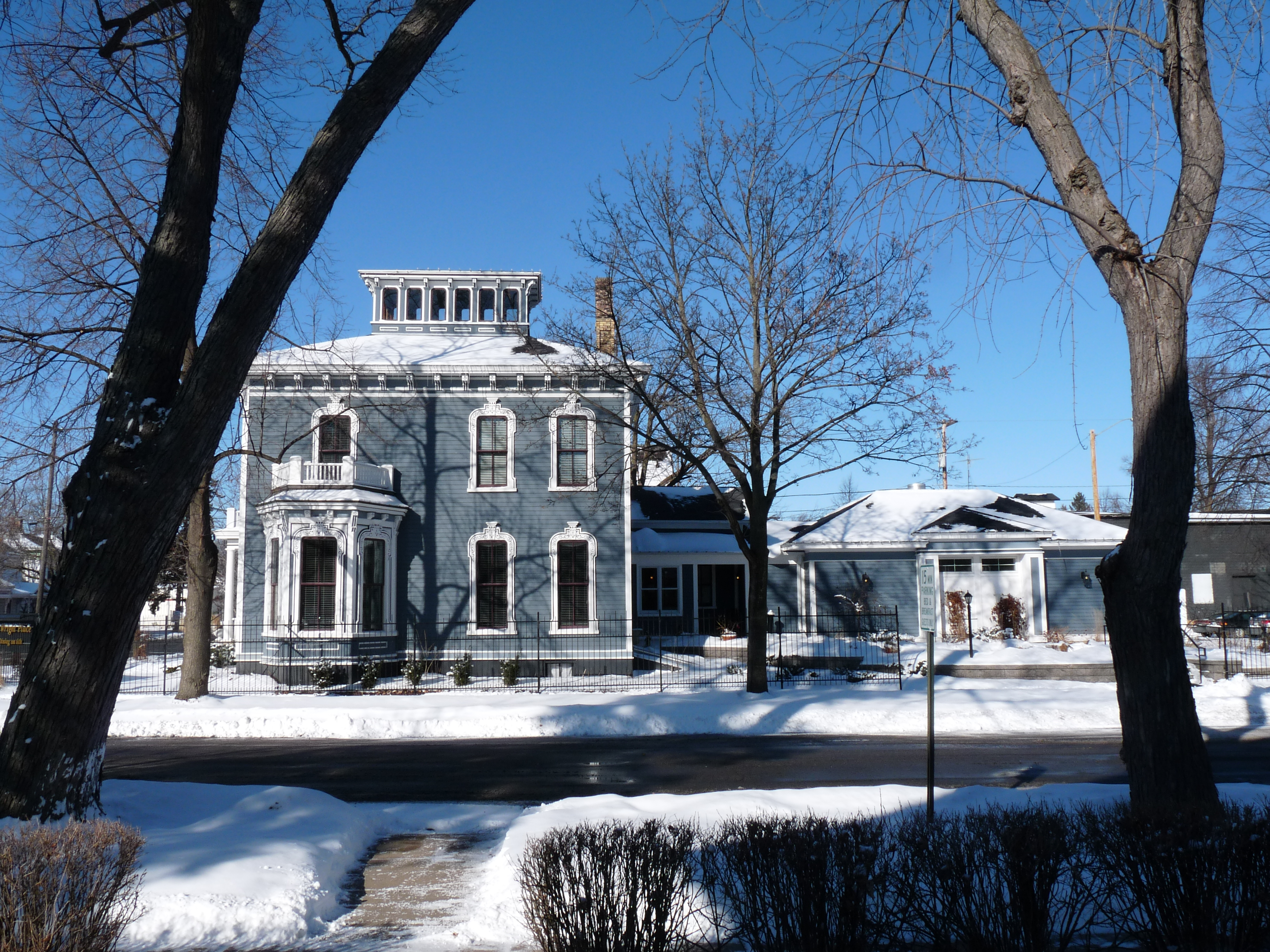

- Location within Wisconsin Location within the United States
- Location: 901 6th St. Wausau, Wisconsin
- Coordinates: 44°57′50″N 89°37′22″W
- Area: less than one acre
- Built: 1881
- Architect: John Mercer
- Architectural style: Italianate
- NRHP reference No.: 82000684
- Added to NRHP: March 1, 1982

The Ely Wright House is a historic house located at 901 Sixth Street in Wausau, Wisconsin. It was added to the National Register of Historic Places on March 1, 1982.

== Description and history ==
The fine Italianate style house is two stories, clapboard-clad, with a rectangular cupola. The hood moulds above the windows are decorated with a vine carving. The front door has an elliptical fanlight and sidelights framed by a porch with Doric columns. It was designed and built by John Mercer in 1881.

The house belonged to Ely Wright. Wright was a native of Athens, Pennsylvania who came to Wausau in the 1870s and founded Wausau Iron Works, which built machinery for railroads and sawmills in Wisconsin.
