= First Universalist Church (Wausau, Wisconsin) =

Historic church in Wisconsin, United States

- U.S. National Register of Historic Places
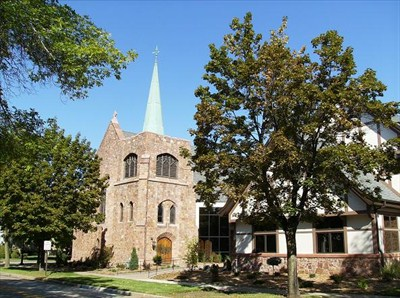
- Location: 504 Grant St. Wausau, Wisconsin
- Coordinates: 44.96246°N 89.625°W
- Built: 1914
- Architect: Alexander C. Eschweiler
- NRHP reference No.: 80000159
- Added to NRHP: May 1, 1980

The First Universalist Church in Wausau was designed by Alexander C. Eschweiler in Tudor Revival style and built in 1914 for the local Universalist congregation. Additions and remodeling were done in 1928, 1956, and 2006. It is still used by the local Unitarian Universalist congregation; in this context, it is called the First Unitarian Universalist Church of Wausau. It was added to the National Register of Historic Places in 1980.
