= Karl Mathie House =

Historic house in Wisconsin, United States

- U.S. National Register of Historic Places
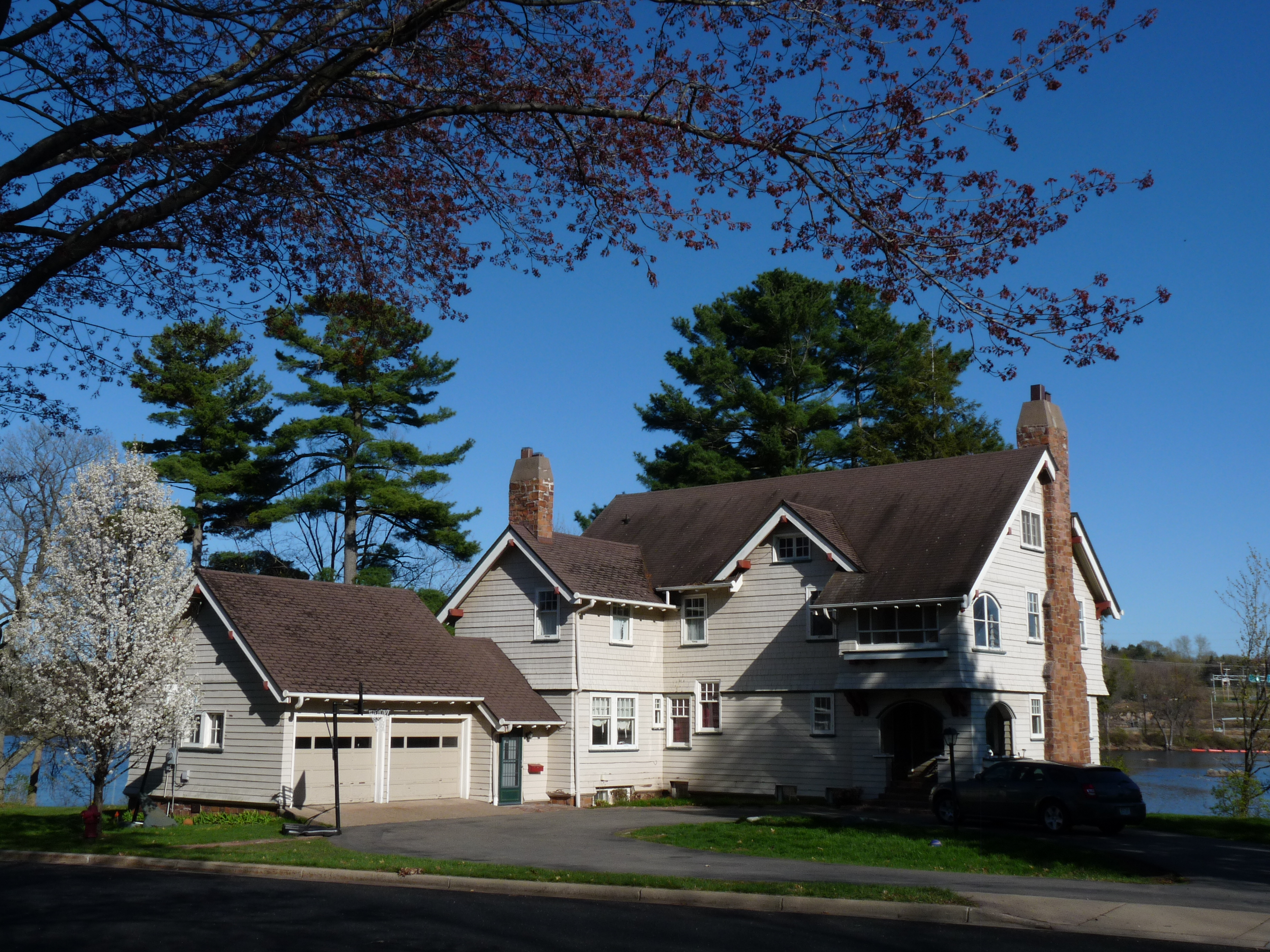
- Karl Mathie House
- Location: 202 Water St., Mosinee, Wisconsin
- Coordinates: 44°47′33″N 89°41′51″W
- Area: 1.5 acres (0.61 ha)
- Built: 1912
- Architect: Alexander C. Eschweiler
- Architectural style: Shingle Style, Bungalow/Craftsman
- MPS: Eschweiler TR of Marathon County
- NRHP reference No.: 80000161
- Added to NRHP: May 1, 1980

The Karl Mathie House is located in Mosinee, Wisconsin.

== History ==
Karl Mathie was a clergyman, educator, and the first president of Wausau Sulphate Fiber Co. (later Wausau Paper), which revived Mosinee's economy after Dessert's sawmill closed. Later purchased by musician John Altenburgh.

The house is located along the Wisconsin River. It was listed on the National Register of Historic Places in 1980 and on the State Register of Historic Places in 1989.
