= Joseph Dessert Library =

- U.S. National Register of Historic Places
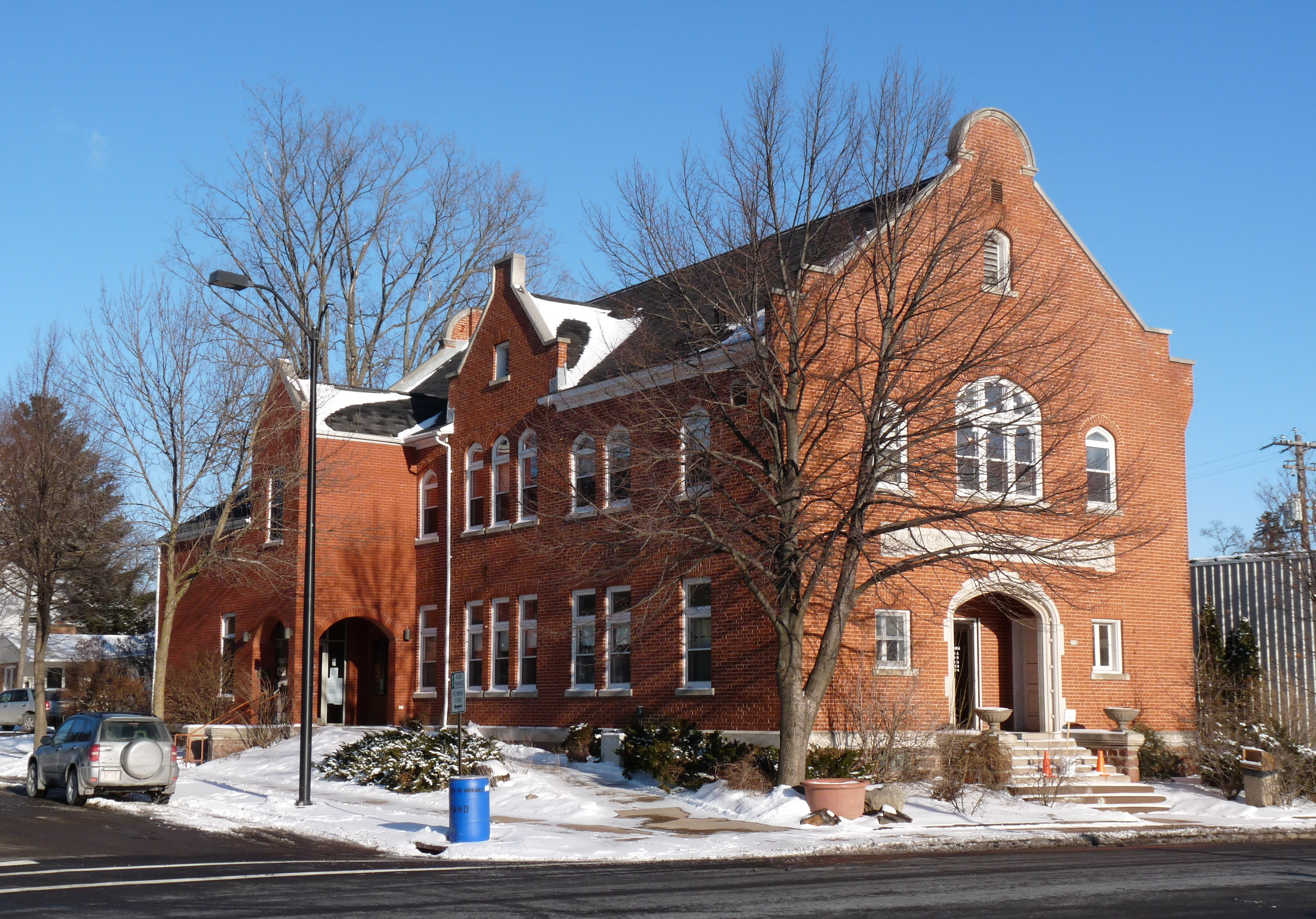

- Location within Wisconsin Location within the United States
- Location: 123 Main St., Mosinee, Wisconsin
- Coordinates: 44°47′31″N 89°42′3″W
- Area: 0.2 acres (0.081 ha)
- Built: 1928
- Architect: Alexander C. Eschweiler
- Architectural style: German Renaissance Revival
- MPS: Eschweiler TR of Marathon County
- NRHP reference No.: 80000156
- Added to NRHP: May 1, 1980

The Joseph Dessert Library (also known as the Marathon County Public Library - Mosinee Branch) at 123 Main St. in Mosinee, Wisconsin was built in 1898 and expanded in 1928. It was designed by architect Alexander C. Eschweiler. It was listed on the National Register of Historic Places in 1980. It is part of the Marathon County Public Library and a member of the Wisconsin Valley Library Service.

Joseph Dessert was a lumberman who came to the area from Quebec in 1844. He worked in a sawmill at Mosinee (then called Little Bull Falls) for a few years, then bought the mill with three partners in 1849. By 1859 he alone owned the mill, and he ran it for forty years. In the interest of his employees, he sponsored construction of this library, appointed the first board of trustees, stocked it with books, and paid for maintenance for several years. This library has been placed on the National Register of historic places by United States Department of Interior.
