= C. H. Wegner House =

Historic house in Wisconsin, United States

- U.S. National Register of Historic Places
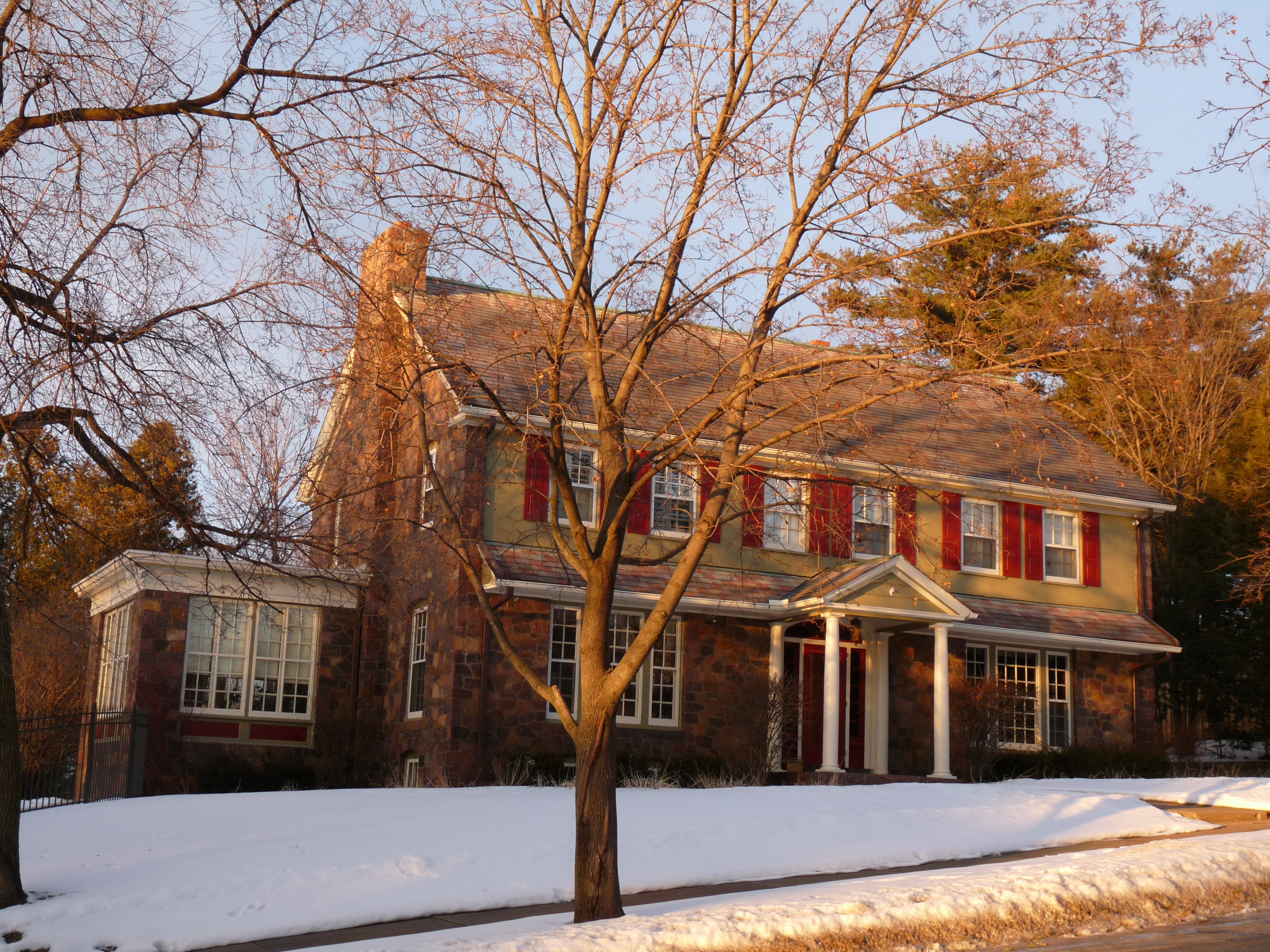
- C. H. Wegner House
- Location: 906 Grant St., Wausau, Wisconsin
- Coordinates: 44°57′44″N 89°37′02″W
- Area: 0.4 acres (0.16 ha)
- Built: 1922-1924
- Architect: Alexander C. Eschweiler
- Architectural style: Colonial Revival
- MPS: Eschweiler TR of Marathon County
- NRHP reference No.: 80000164
- Added to NRHP: May 1, 1980

The C. H. Wegner House is located in Wausau, Wisconsin.

== History ==
Charles and Emma Wegner had this Colonial Revival home designed by Eschweiler and built 1922–24. Wegner ran a general store downtown. Still has breakfast nook and built-in cupboards and ice box.

It was listed on the National Register of Historic Places in 1980 and on the State Register of Historic Places in 1989.
