= D. C. Everest House =

Historic house in Wisconsin, United States

- D.C. Everest House
- U.S. National Register of Historic Places
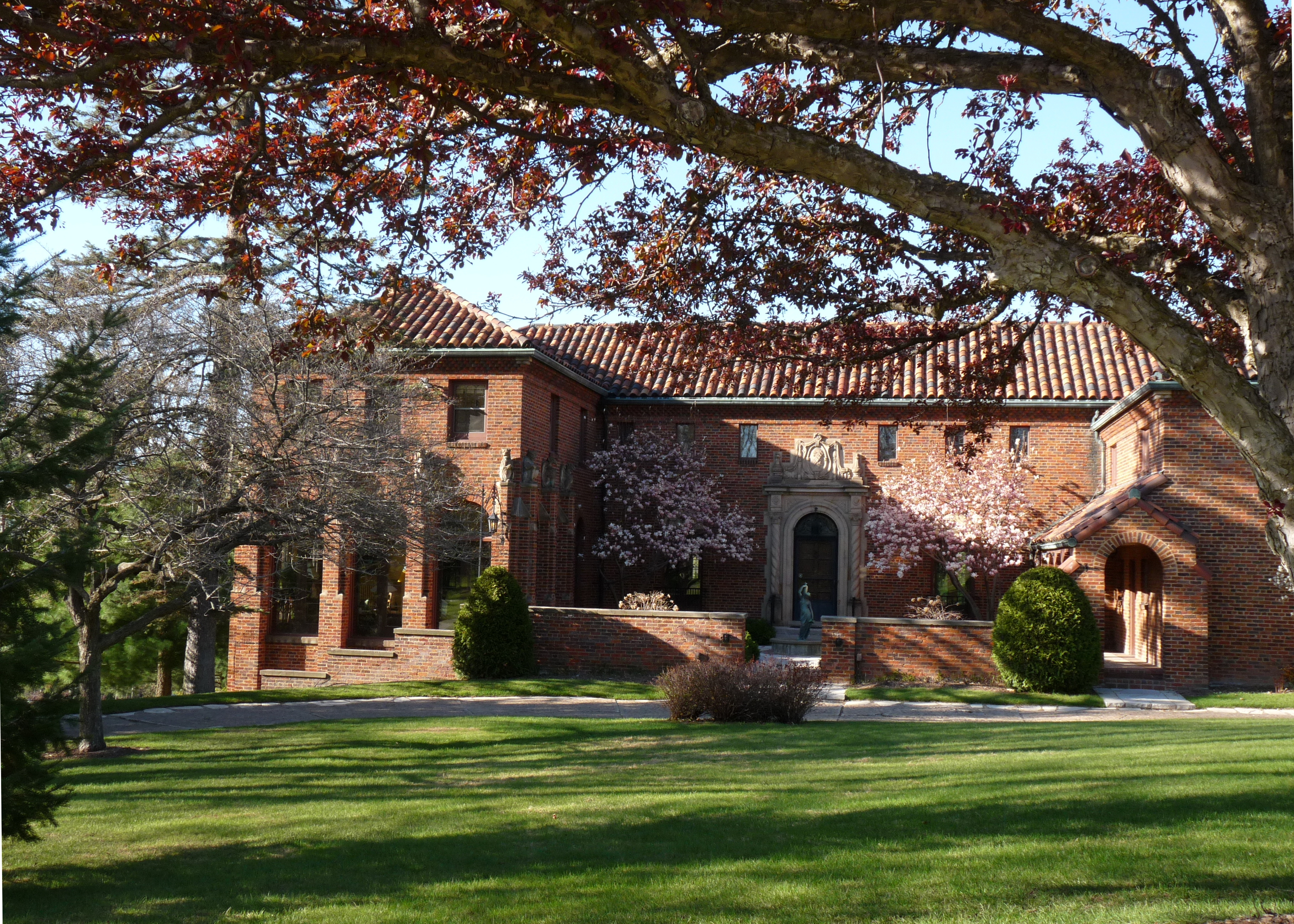

- Location within Wisconsin Location within the United States
- Location: 1206 Highland Park Blvd. Wausau, Wisconsin
- Coordinates: 44°57′55″N 89°36′45″W
- Built: 1925-28
- Architect: Alexander C. Eschweiler
- NRHP reference No.: 80000158
- Added to NRHP: May 1, 1980

The D.C. Everest House is an English-Spanish Baroque-styled home in Wausau, Wisconsin, United States. It was added to the National Register of Historic Places in 1980.

== History ==
David Clark Everest came to Wausau in 1909, when he was made general manager of the new Marathon Paper Mills Company. He led the company for 46 years, into specialty papers and an expansion into printing.

Clark had this house built from 1925 to 1928. It is a three-story U-shaped villa overlooking downtown Wausau. The roofs are hipped and covered with tiles imported from Spain. Parts of the outside are decorated with gargoyles. The inside is decorated with hand-hewn beams, lead-glass windows, and custom decorations.

Everest was inducted into the Paper Industry International Hall of Fame at the Paper Discovery Center in Appleton, Wisconsin in 2000.

== See also ==
- D.C. Everest School District
