= Fromm Brothers Fur and Ginseng Farm =

Coordinates: 45°05′31″N 89°52′44″W

- U.S. National Register of Historic Places
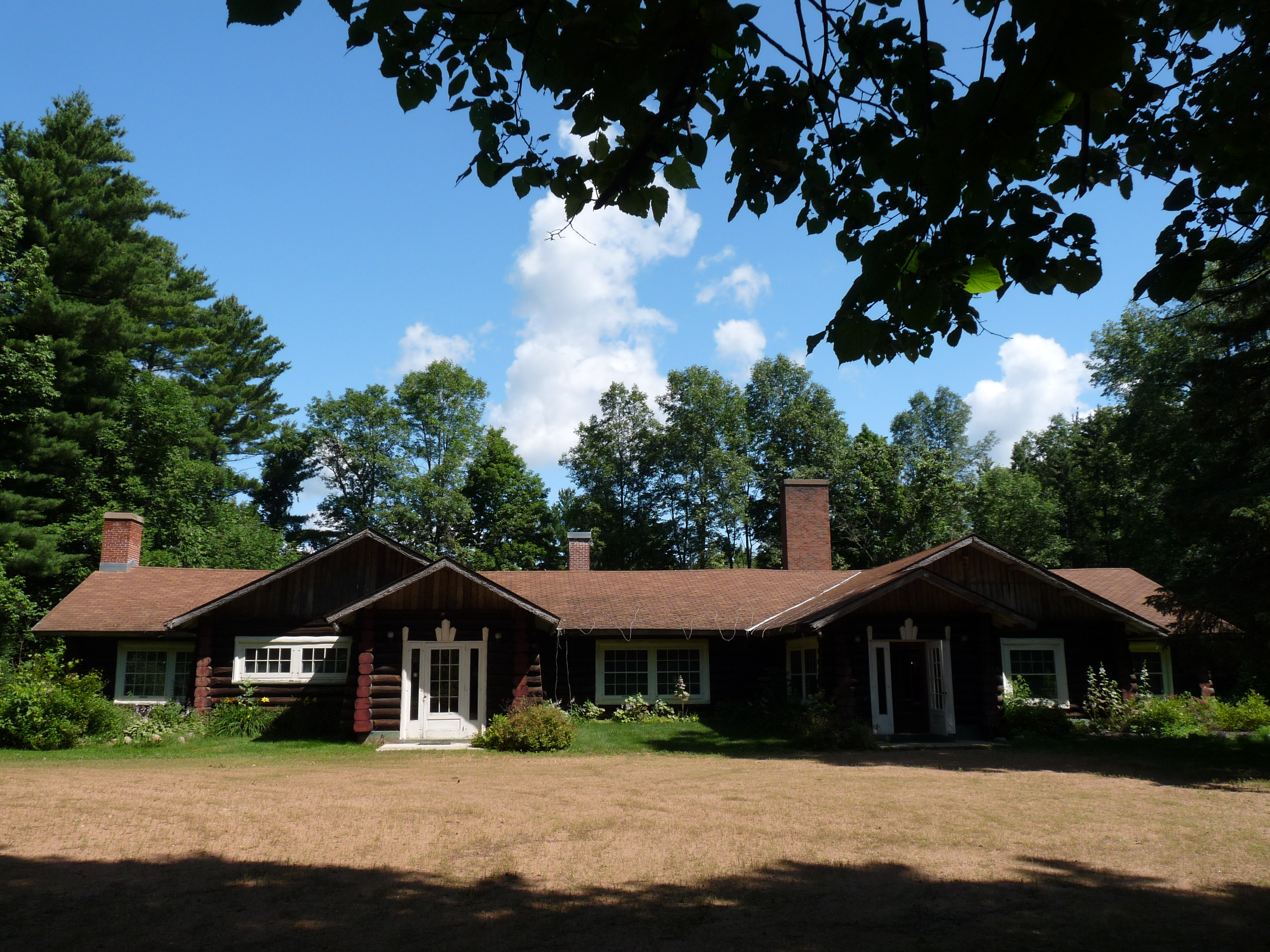
- The clubhouse at the farm

- Location within Wisconsin Location within the United States
- Location: 436 Co. Hwy. F, Hamburg
- Website: www.frommhistory.org
- NRHP reference No.: 96001581
- Added to NRHP: November 6, 2013

The Fromm Brothers Fur and Ginseng Farm is a farm complex in the Town of Hamburg, Marathon County, Wisconsin where four brothers pioneered ginseng farming starting in 1904, and used the profits to develop silver fox farming. By 1929 they were the world's largest producer of both products. The farm was listed on the National Register of Historic Places in 2013, considered significant at a national level because of the brothers' innovations in ginseng farming and in fur production and marketing.

== Beginnings ==
By 1901 the Fromm/Nieman family had been farming in Hamburg for decades. While farming, some of the sons had been trapping red fox for supplemental income. Furs of wild animals were a popular part of fashionable clothes at the time, and they brought a good price. More valuable than red fox was the silver fox, a sport of the red fox. In 1901, the brothers read in Hunter Trapper magazine about a silver fox pelt that sold in London for $1200, the price of many Wisconsin farms at the time. Four of the brothers made a pact to raise silver foxes. They were Walter, Edward, John and Henry Fromm, and these eight to thirteen-year-old boys began calling themselves "The Company." But to get fox-breeding off the ground, they needed money.

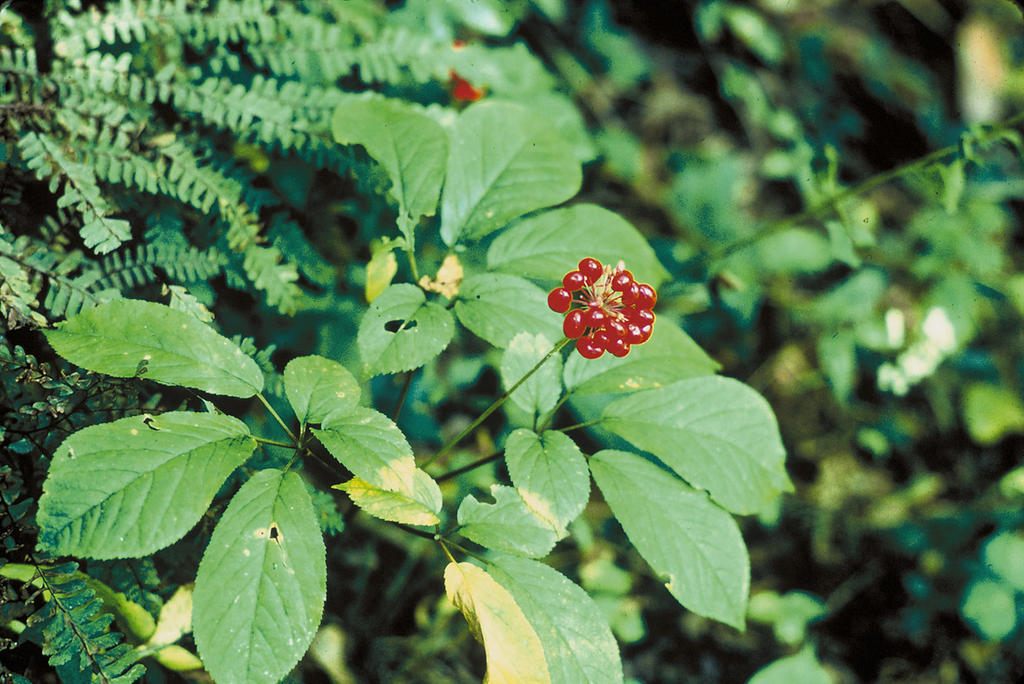

Wild ginseng had been collected in the forests of North America for hundreds of years, for sale to China. Reinhold Dietsch, a neighbor of the Fromms, was experimenting with cultivating it, and he shared with the brothers how to plant the roots in beds and how to build lath arbors over the plants to simulate the shade of the forest. In 1904 the brothers planted some wild roots they had found in their mother's garden. When their father refused to give them lath to use for their crazy scheme, they bought it themselves. When they asked for more land to plant on, he offered them only a rock pile. They moved the rocks and planted. To grow more ginseng, the brothers needed to plant seeds, rather than the few roots they found in the forest. This required a tricky process of germinating seeds in layers of sand buried in boxes for a year, which they learned from Eastern ginseng growers. Ginseng roots take about five years to mature, and the first crop grown from seeds was finally harvested in 1912. In 1915 they harvested a half acre, and it sold for $3,500.

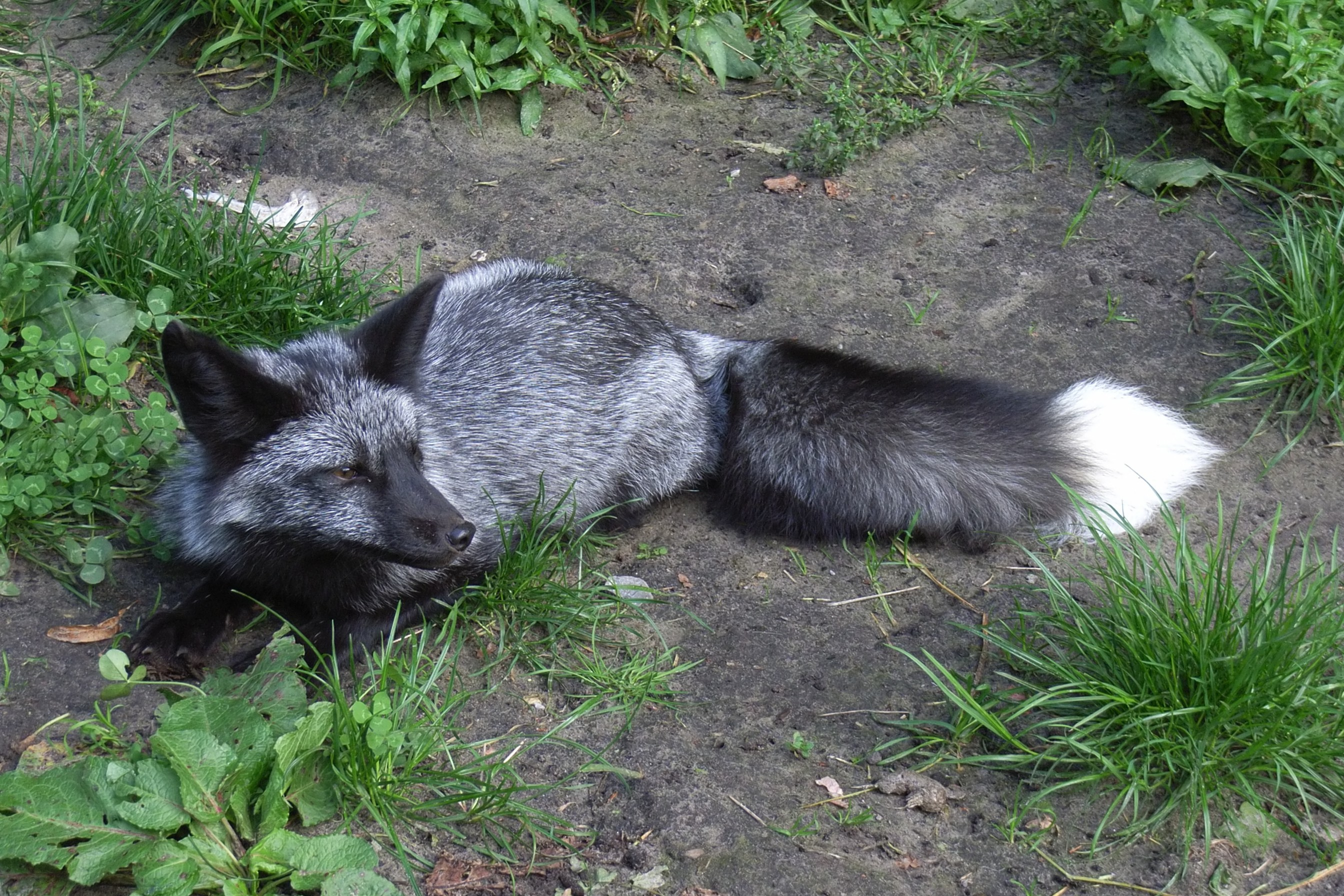

The silver fox is not a separate species, but is a genetic variant born occasionally to red foxes. Since the silver is rare in the wild, it is more valuable than red fox. In the 1880s some men on Prince Edward Island tried breeding silver fox to each other in captivity, and managed to produce more silver fox pelts to sell. Their production technique was kept a secret until one of the silver foxes escaped, and led hounds back to their secret farm. By 1909, other fox farms were operating on Prince Edward Island.

Back in Wisconsin, in 1909 the Fromm brothers managed to buy or catch twelve red foxes. They paired them up in pens, hoping they would produce pups – maybe a silver pup. No pups appeared that first year. The next year twelve red fox pups were born. A red fox pelt was worth $20 at the time – far from the $1200 silver pelt they had read about. A pair of silver fox would be reasonably likely to produce silver pups, but a breeding pair cost about $35,000. They couldn't afford that, but a friendly dealer (James Kane) sold them a black fox and a red fox with silver ancestors for $550. This pair bore pups in 1912, but they were red. Kane sold them another similar breeding pair, but the male ate the female in shipment. They bought a replacement for that female, and in 1913 one of these pairs produced four red pups, and finally one silver! That year two of the brothers chiseled in the rock at the top of nearby Rib Mountain: John and Henry Fromm Pioneer Breeders of Silver Foxes 1913

But still, they had only one true silver fox. The brothers decided that to get more silver fox, they must simply spend the money for more breeding animals. In 1915 James Kane had three silver fox available for $6,500. The ginseng hadn't produced that much money yet. While their father was gone to Iowa, the brothers talked their mother into borrowing the money for them. The family farm had been her dowry and was still in her name, so she mortgaged it, for $6,500. Unfortunately, a month later when the first World War began, the price of both furs and ginseng plummeted. Those three silver fox were suddenly worth only $1,000 and ginseng worth a third what it had been. But in the following months, while other fox breeders folded, the Fromms bought more breeding stock at low prices. The next year their farm produced seventeen silver fox pups, and 25 the next. By the end of the war, prices were rebounding and they were producing more and more pelts.

While struggling with fox, the brothers also faced challenges in growing ginseng. When the seedlings got blight, they sprayed them with slaked lime and blue vitriol. By 1915 they had three acres of ginseng. For root-washing in the fall, they powered a water pump with a car engine, and they initially dried the roots in their house's attic. For the labor-intensive planting and harvesting, they hired teen-aged men and women, and organized them into teams. When they needed forest loam for growing ginseng, they found that they could produce acceptable loam by plowing under green oats. In 1918, when their harvest had outgrown the house's attic, their father loaned them $1,500 to build a drying building, with a heating system and space for grinding fox food. (They had made him a believer.) When half the ginseng crop spoiled in that new building, they installed fans and split the processing into two phases. The successful ginseng harvest in 1915 helped pay off the mortgage on the farm. In 1919 their ginseng sold for $40,000, and they had become the biggest producer in the U.S.

== Success, and ongoing challenges ==
In 1920 the Fromms' businessman-banker cousin John Nieman and his son Edwin partnered with them, investing in their company by buying silver fox breeding stock. In the same year, the Fromm brothers' sister Erna married Edwin Nieman, and the Fromms gave the couple ten pairs of silver fox as dowry. They moved twenty-four pairs of silver fox to the Nieman farm in Thiensville. The company was now called "Fromm Bros. Nieman Company."

They noticed that the foxes in Thiensville generally produced larger litters, probably due to the gentler climate. On the other hand, the fox in Marathon county generally developed nicer pelts, probably due to the colder winter. Aware of this, the company moved all the breeding pairs to Thiensville and began trucking most of the young foxes up to Marathon County each fall for finishing.

By 1922 the operation at Hamburg was employing so many people that they built the boarding house. In 1923 they built the dairy barn to feed their workers, and in 1924 the bunk house.

Through the 1920s, the ginseng crops brought from $45,000 to $115,000 per year. The expanding operation needed more space, so the Fromms bought several neighboring farms. In 1921, Walter came up with a labor-saving way to spray the ginseng with a hose reel on a horse-drawn cart. From 1923 to 1926 their seeds rotted during germination, so they reverted to an earlier stratification technique. When their acreage grew too large for hand-planting, Walter and straw-boss Herbert Kleinschmidt constructed a semi-automated 13-row ginseng planter that could plant three acres per day.

The brothers tinkered with the diet of the fox. In 1915 an outbreak of rickets had hit their animals. At that time they were feeding the fox a lot of horse meat, but after deboning it. Henry suspected that the lack of bones caused the rickets. They tried adding ground bones to the diet and the rickets problem faded. By 1922 they had diversified the diet to include beef, mutton, veal, woodchuck, rabbit, fish, eggs, milk, bread, vegetables, and fruit. They were careful about sanitation for their valuable fox. Over time, they decided that one feeding a day was sufficient.

In 1924 and 1925 some of the fox got sick and died. After ruling out food poisoning, the Fromms suspected distemper, and funded investigation by Dr. Robert G. Green from the University of Minnesota. Over the course of a decade, Green found encephalitis in the fox herd and created a vaccine for it. He also found distemper among the fox, and developed a serum against it. It wasn't quite ready in 1938 when distemper began to rip through the Hamburg farm. In desperation, Green and the Fromms administered the not-quite-ready vaccine. It worked, stopping the epidemic. Green and the Fromms conducted this work through a venture that eventually became Fromm Labs, which patented these vaccines.

In the 1930s the price of ginseng dropped due to the Great Depression and problems in China. Many other U.S. ginseng growers gave up on the crop, but Edward had visited China in 1930 and believed the market would rebound, so the Fromms stockpiled their harvest in barrels and continued to plant new acreage every year. Fourteen years later the Fromms were vindicated when World War II ended and the market for ginseng revived. They sold their stockpile for a million dollars, and planted more.
