= Duey and Julia Wright House =

Historic house in Wisconsin, United States

- U.S. National Register of Historic Places
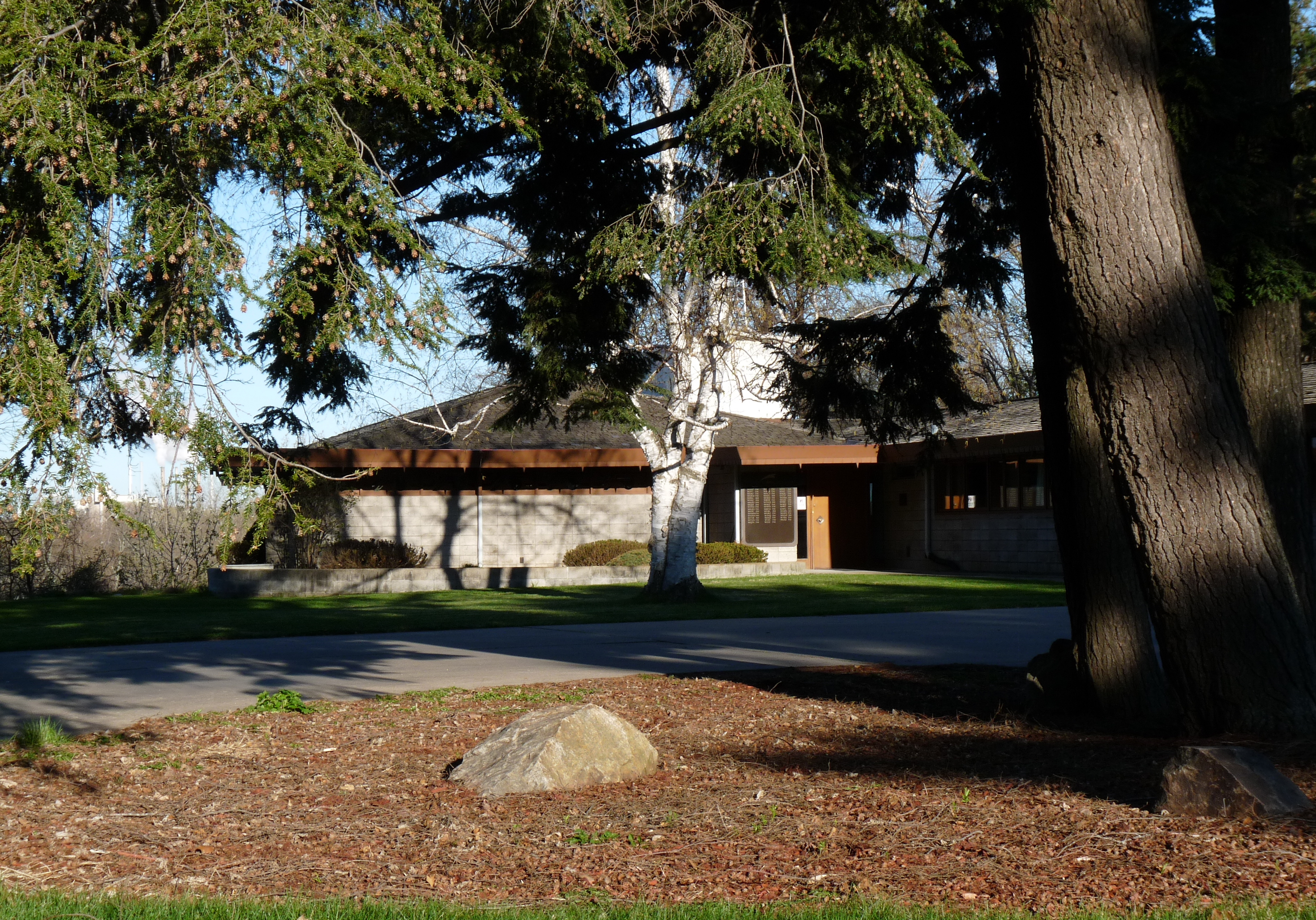

- Location within Wisconsin Location within the United States
- Location: Wausau, Wisconsin
- Coordinates: 44°56′57″N 89°37′23″W
- Built: 1959
- Architect: Frank Lloyd Wright
- Architectural style: Usonian
- NRHP reference No.: 99000787
- Added to NRHP: July 16, 1999

The Duey and Julia Wright House is a Usonian home designed by Frank Lloyd Wright and constructed on a bluff above the Wisconsin River in Wausau, Wisconsin in 1958. Viewed from the sky, the house resembles a musical note. The client (no relation to the architect) owned a Wausau music store, and later founded the broadcasting company Midwest Communications through his ownership of WRIG radio. The home also has perforated boards on the clerestories "represent the rhythm of Beethoven's Fifth Symphony Allegro con brio first theme."

The use of materials in the home (concrete blocks), its single floor, suggests that the home is a Usonian design, however it is larger than most: 4,337 square feet (403 m^{2}). Yet, the arrangement of the floor plan uses Usonian principles: the kitchen is open to the living room and dining area, and the four bedrooms are accessible from a gallery, and there is a clerestory that uses perforated plywood panels designed specifically for the home. The living room has a builtin bench around the wall, to allow seating for 30 people during live concerts.

The home was designed by Frank Lloyd Wright, but completed after his death under the direction of John H. "Jack" Howe and John deKoven Hill, former apprentices of Wright and members of the Taliesin Fellowship. At that time, both Hill and Howe were architects in Taliesin Associated Architects, Wright's successor firm.

== See also ==
- List of Frank Lloyd Wright works
- National Register of Historic Places listings in Marathon County, Wisconsin
