= East Hill Residential Historic District =

Historic district in Wisconsin, United States

- U.S. National Register of Historic Places
- U.S. Historic district
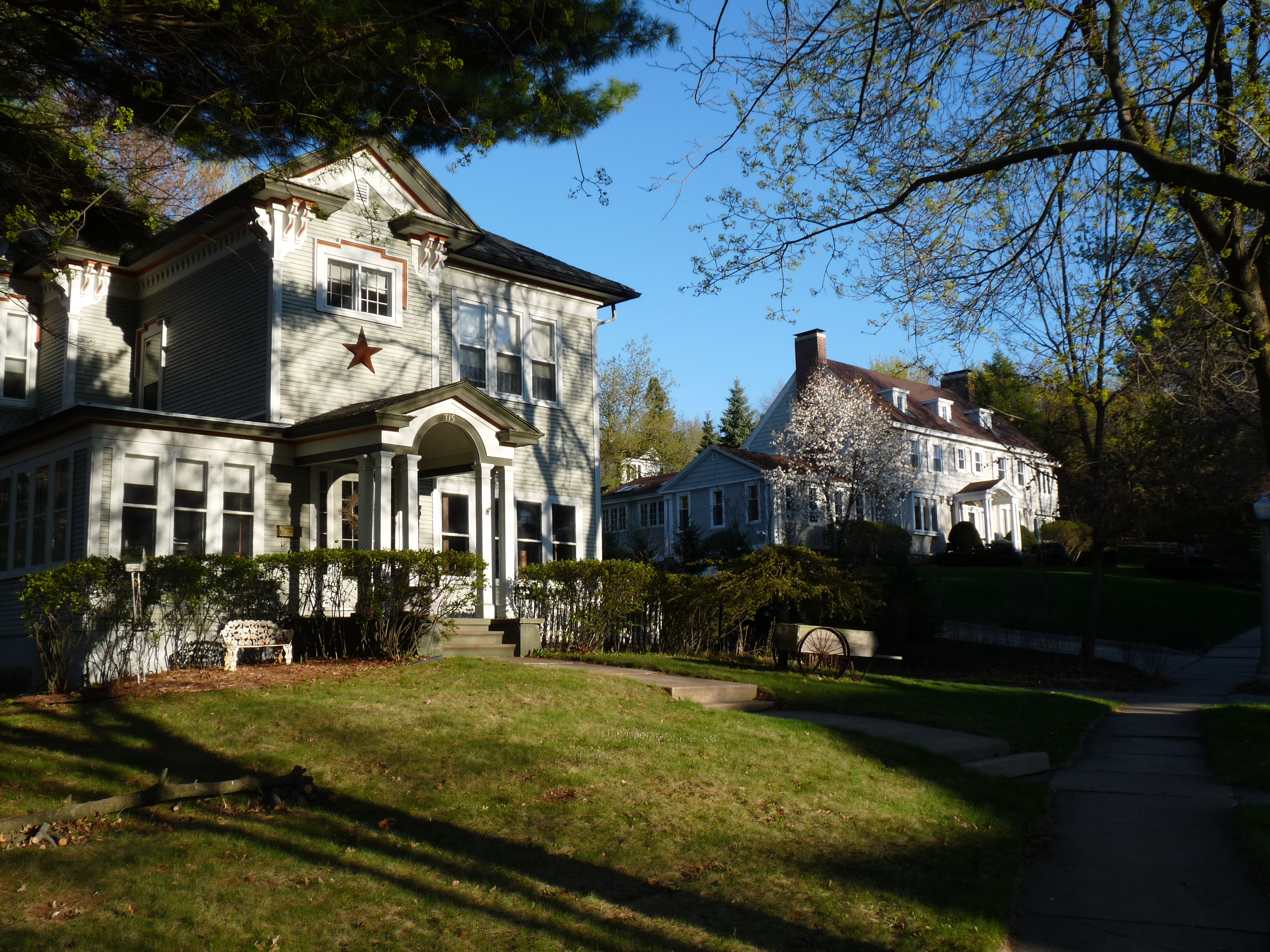
- Location: Wausau, Wisconsin
- Coordinates: 44.96311°N 89.61779°W
- NRHP reference No.: 04000360
- Added to NRHP: April 21, 2004

The East Hill Residential Historic District is a large old neighborhood on the east side of Wausau, Wisconsin where many prominent citizens lived, with about 165 contributing properties built from 1883 to 1945. It was added to the National Register of Historic Places in 2004.

== Description ==
In addition to residential buildings, the district also features Wausau East High School, built in 1936 and expanded later. Houses in the district include ones designed by Alexander C. Eschweiler and George W. Maher. Among them is the E.K. Schuetz House.
