= Alexander C. Eschweiler =

American architect

- Born: August 10, 1865
- Died: June 12, 1940 (aged 74)
- Education: Cornell University
- Occupation: Architect
- Relatives: Franz C. Eschweiler (Brother) Thomas Chadbourne (Cousin)

Alexander Chadbourne Eschweiler (August 10, 1865 – June 12, 1940) was an American architect with a practice in Milwaukee, Wisconsin. He designed residences, churches, and commercial buildings. His substantial turn-of-the-20th-century residences for the Milwaukee business elite, in conservative Tudor, Jacobethan, and neo-Georgian idioms, have preserved their cachet in the city. His eye-catching Japonist pagoda design for Wadham's Oil and Grease Company filling station in Milwaukee is still admired.

== Early life ==
Eschweiler was born in Boston, Massachusetts. He studied at Marquette College and Cornell University, graduating in 1890. Eschweiler opened his practice in Milwaukee in 1892. In 1891 he married Maria Theresa Whilhelmina Mueller in Milwaukee, Wisconsin, and they had six children survive to adulthood. In 1923 his sons, Alexander C. Eschweiler Jr., Theodore, and Carl joined him in practice.

== Career ==
A number of Eschweiler works are listed on the National Register of Historic Places.

Eighty-one surviving commissions were listed in the exhibition "Alexander Eschweiler in Milwaukee: Celebrating a Rich Architectural Heritage" at the Charles Allis Art Museum in 2007.

== Personal life ==
=== Summer home ===
The Eschweilers had a second home overlooking North Lake in the village of Chenequa, Wisconsin. It was originally a 100-acre parcel he had purchased in the early 1900s, which included a small cottage from the 1870s. It was eventually torn down and the land was subdivided to settle the estate. The property was split into a 2.8-acre parcel and an 8.3-acre parcel, but six of the acres in the larger parcel are along the lake and are placed in a conservation easement that prohibits development.

Eschweiler was instrumental in the incorporation of the village of Chenequa. He was one of a handful of notable residents that testified in court that it was his residence.

=== Death ===
He is buried at St. Peter's Episcopal Church, North Lake, next to his wife and daughter. His plot is near St. Teresa of Calcutta Church, "so he could overlook his 'masterpiece.'"

== Legacy ==
Cornell University Department of Architecture, Art, and Planning awards the Eschweiler Prize for Merit and Distinction in M.Arch. Design Studio.

== Selected works ==
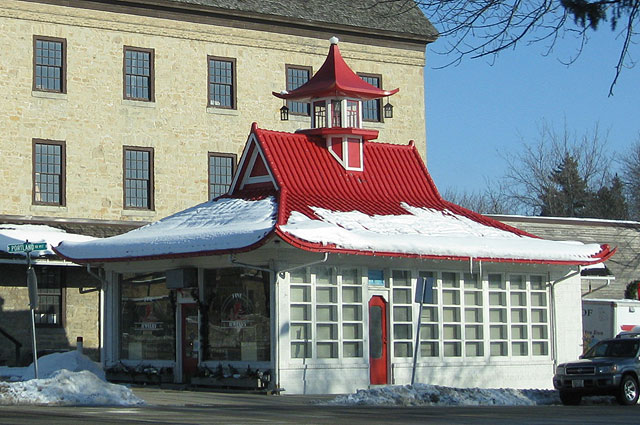
A former Wadham's pagoda

Works include (with attribution): (by year)

- Edward Cowdery House, 2743 N. Lake Drive, Milwaukee, 1896.
- Milwaukee Gas Light Company, West Side works.
- John Murphy House, 2030 E. Lafayette Place, Milwaukee, 1899. A compromise with Prairie School architecture.
- Robert Nunnemacher house, 2409 N. Wahl Avenue, Milwaukee, 1906. Symmetrical Jacobethan style, brick with stone quoins.
- Charles Allis House, 1801 N. Prospect Avenue, Milwaukee, 1909, in a Jacobethan style. Now open as the Charles Allis Art Museum.
- James K. Ilsley House, Milwaukee.
- Elizabeth Black residence.
- 1919, St. John Church in Monches and St. Clare in North Lake, which together make up Blessed Teresa of Calcutta
- Thomas A. Greene Memorial Museum, Milwaukee.
- Milwaukee-Downer "Quad", now University of Wisconsin at Milwaukee, NW corner of Hartford and Downer Aves. Milwaukee, WI (Eschweiler, Alexander C.), NRHP-listed
- John Mariner Building (Hotel Metro), Milwaukee, 1937. Art Moderne in style, with curved wrap-around corners; the first commercial structure in Milwaukee to feature air conditioning.
- Wisconsin Gas Building, Milwaukee.
- Wisconsin Telephone Building, 722 N. Broadway. Ground floor remodeled for AT&T.
- Milwaukee Arena.
- C. B. Bird House, 522 McIndoe St. Wausau, 1910, (Eschweiler, Alexander C.), NRHP-listed
- Chi Psi Lodge at the University of Wisconsin-Madison, 150 Iota Court, Madison, 1913 (Eschweiler, Alexander C.), Madison Historic Landmarks
- First Universalist Church, 504 Grant St. Wausau, 1914, (Eschweiler, Alexander C.), NRHP-listed
- Marathon County Fairgrounds stock judging pavilion, Wausau, 1921
- E.K. Schuetz House, 930 Franklin St. Wausau, 1922, Wausau, WI (Eschweiler, Alexander C.), NRHP-listed
- D. C. Everest House, 1206 Highland Park Blvd. Wausau, 1925, (Eschweiler & Eschweiler), NRHP-listed
- C. F. Dunbar House, 929 McIndoe St. Wausau, 1926 (Eschweiler & Eschweiler), NRHP-listed
- St. Peter's Episcopal Church, 302 Merchants Ave. Fort Atkinson, 1928 (Eschweiler & Eschweiler)
- Horace A.J. Upham House, W9888 Hwy 13, Wisconsin Dells, WI, 1899. (Pictures:1, 2, 3, 4, 5, 6, 7, 8, 9, 10, 11 & 12) (Wis Arch Inventory #6072)

(Others, alphabetically)

- Charles Allis House, 1630 E. Royall Pl. Milwaukee, WI (Eschweiler, Alexander C.), NRHP-listed
- Bank of Hartland, 112 E. Capitol Dr. Hartland, WI (Eschweiler & Eschweiler), NRHP-listed
- Edward D. & Vina Shattuck Beals House, 220 N. Park Ave. Neenah, WI (Eschweiler, Alexander C.), NRHP-listed
- Joseph Dessert Library, 123 Main St. Mosinee, WI (Eschweiler, Alexander C.), NRHP-listed
- One or more works in East Hill Residential Historic District, roughly bounded by North Seventh, Adams, North Tenth, Scott and North Bellis Sts. Wausau, WI (Eschweiler, Alexander), NRHP-listed
- Thomas A. Greene Memorial Museum, 3367 N. Downer Ave. Milwaukee, WI (Eschweiler, Alexander C., Sr.), NRHP-listed
- Harold Hornburg House, 213 Warren Ave. Hartland, WI (Eschweiler & Eschweiler), NRHP-listed
- Arthur Manegold House, 1202 S. Layton Blvd, Milwaukee, WI (Eschweiler, Alexander C.), NRHP-listed
- Marathon County Fairgrounds, Stewart Ave. Wausau, WI (Eschweiler, Alexander C.), NRHP-listed
- Marshfield Senior High School, 900 E. Fourth St. Marshfield, WI (Eschweiler & Eschweiler), NRHP-listed
- Karl Mathie House, 202 Water St. Mosinee, WI (Eschweiler, Alexander C.), NRHP-listed
- Milwaukee County School of Agriculture and Domestic Economy Historic District, 9722 Watertown Plank Rd. Wauwatosa, WI (Eschweiler, Alexander C.), NRHP-listed
- Painesdale, Area encompassing Painesdale streets and the Champion Mine Painesdale, MI (Eschweiler, A.C.), NRHP-listed
- Pittsburgh Plate Glass Enamel Plant, 201 E. Pittsburgh Ave. Milwaukee, WI (Eschweiler & Eschweiler), NRHP-listed
- Rogers Memorial Hospital, 34700 Valley Road, Oconomowoc, WI
- Spencerian Business College, 2800 W Wright St. Milwaukee, WI (Eschweiler, Alexander; Eschweiler & Eschweiler), NRHP-listed
- Wadhams Gas Station, 1647 S. 76th St. West Allis, WI (Eschweiler, Alexander C.), NRHP-listed
- Wawbeek-Horace A.J. Upham House, WI 13 Wisconsin Dells, WI (Eschweiler, Alexander C.), NRHP-listed
- C. H. Wegner House, 906 Grant St. Wausau, WI (Eschweiler, Alexander C.), NRHP-listed
