= E.K. Schuetz House =

Historic house in Wisconsin, United States

- U.S. National Register of Historic Places
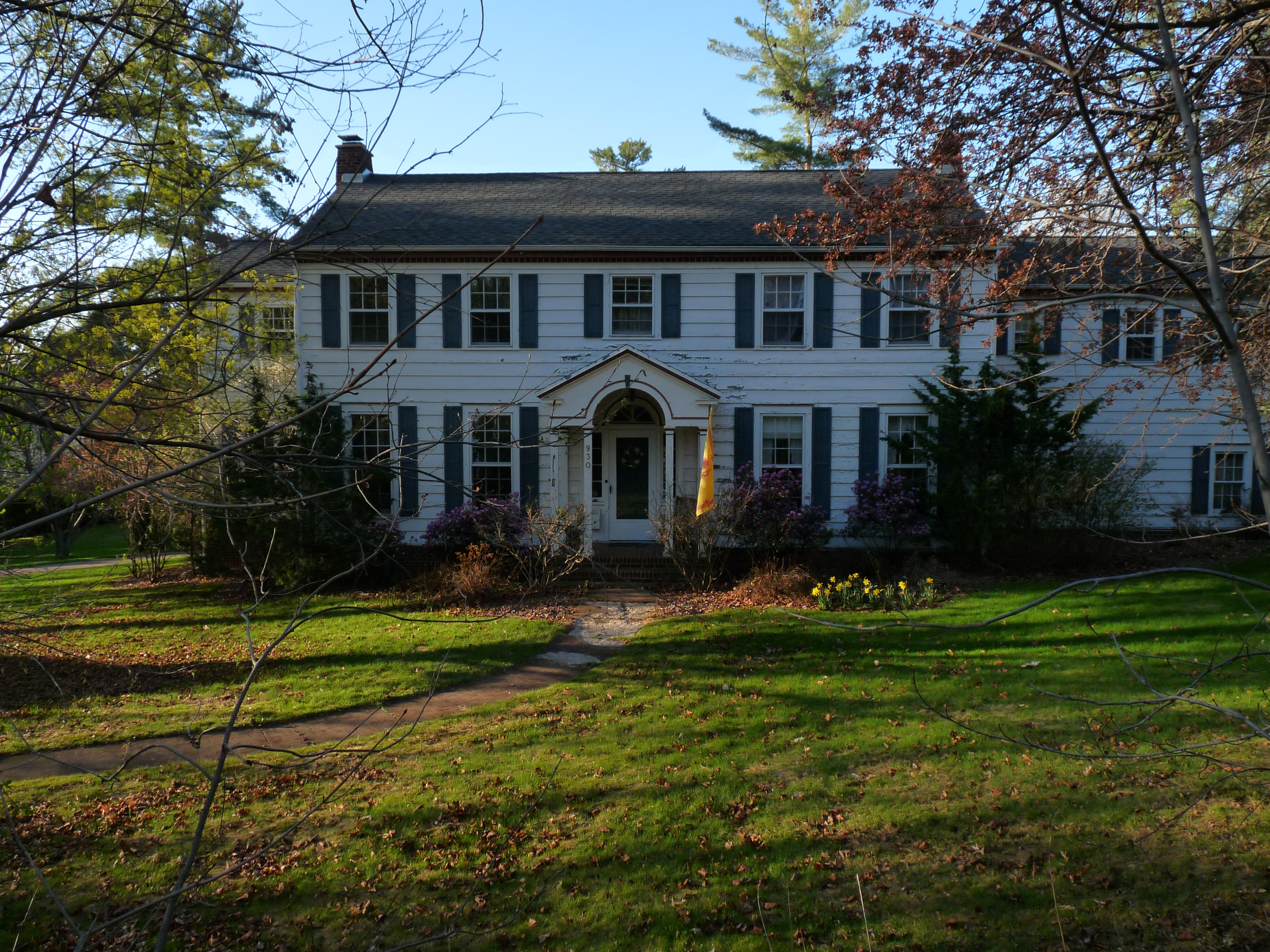

- Location within Wisconsin Location within the United States
- Location: 930 Franklin St. Wausau, Wisconsin
- Coordinates: 44°57′48″N 89°36′56″W
- Built: 1922
- Architect: Alexander C. Eschweiler
- Architectural style: Colonial Revival
- NRHP reference No.: 80000162
- Added to NRHP: May 1, 1980

The E.K. Schuetz House is a historic house located in Wausau, Wisconsin. It was added to the National Register of Historic Places in 1980.

The house was designed in simple Colonial Revival style by Eschweiler and built in 1922 for E.K. Schuetz. Schuetz was a founder of the Wausau Motor Parts Company and son-in-law of C.F. Dunbar, whose house lies behind this one. The house is within the East Hill Residential Historic District.
