= C. F. Dunbar House =

Historic house in Wisconsin, United States

- U.S. National Register of Historic Places
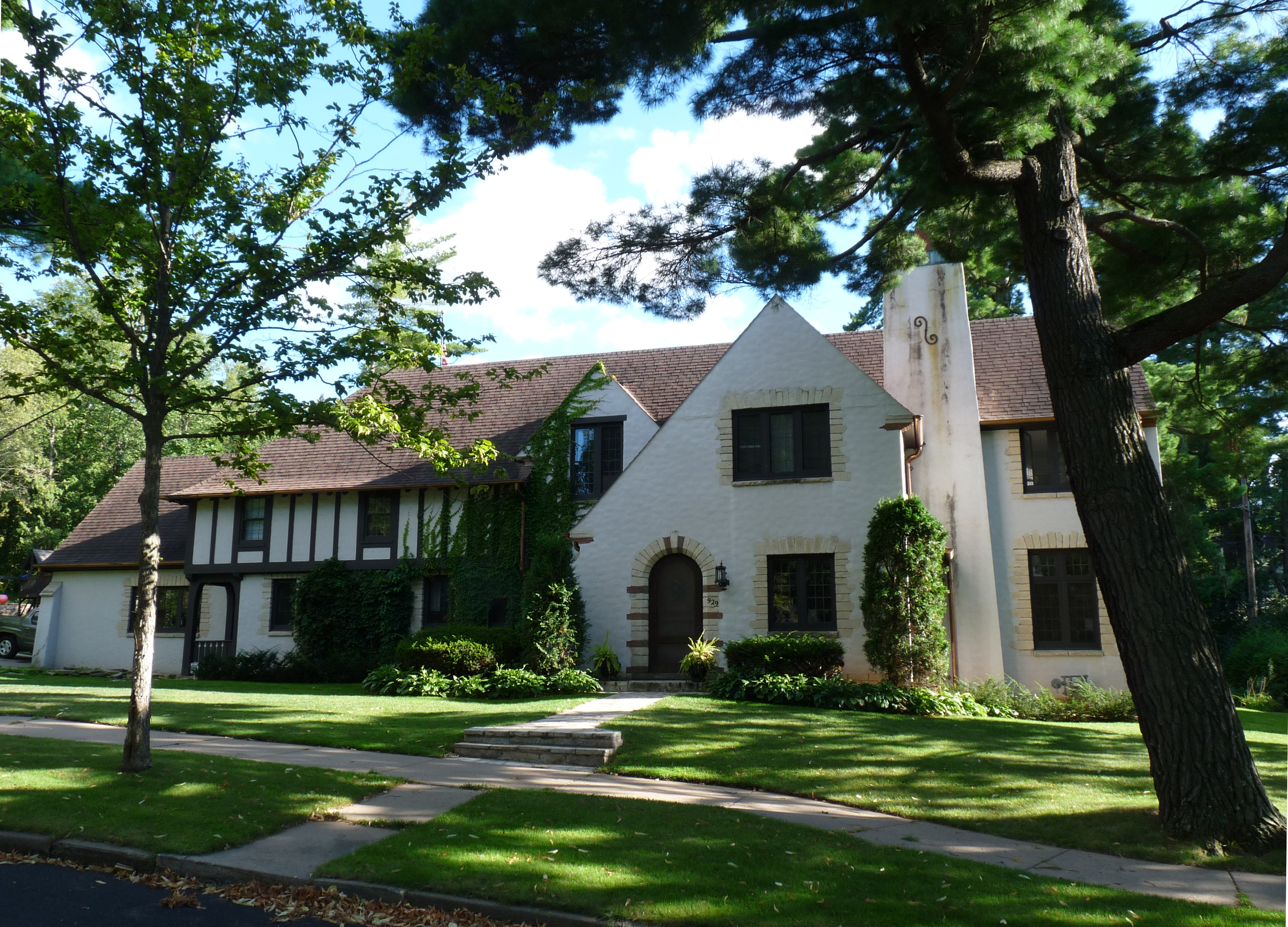
- C. F. Dunbar House
- Location: 929 McIndoe St. Wausau, Wisconsin
- Coordinates: 44.9638°N 89.6159°W
- Architect: Alexander C. Eschweiler
- NRHP reference No.: 80000157
- Added to NRHP: May 1, 1980

The C. F. Dunbar House is a Tudor Revival house built in 1926 in Wausau, Wisconsin, United States. It was added to the National Register of Historic Places in 1980.

== History ==
Charles Dunbar came to Wausau in 1874 and started a jewelry store and a bicycle shop. He also invested in land in Marathon County and 400 lots in Wausau, including this one. He married Letitia Single and they lived near the center of town.

After Charles died, Letitia had this house built in 1898 for herself and her daughter Nell. Alexander Eschweiler 1898 it in Tudor Revival style, with brick covered by smooth stucco, and it was built in 1898.
