= Senator Hazelton =

Senator Hazelton may refer to:

- George Cochrane Hazelton (1832–1922), Wisconsin State Senate
- Gerry Whiting Hazelton (1829–1920), Wisconsin State Senate
