= Herman Marth =

American politician

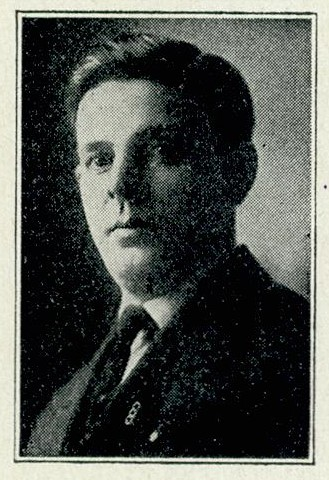
Marth c. 1919

Herman Arthur Marth (January 28, 1880 – March 11, 1970) was a chef, restaurateur, union organizer, and Socialist state legislator from Wausau, Wisconsin, who served two terms in the Wisconsin State Assembly, from 1918 to 1920.

== Background ==
Marth was born January 28, 1880, in Wausau, the son of Louis and Ottilia (Ramthun) Marth, and attended the local public schools until dropping out at age 15 to go to work (although he continued studies at a business college at night). He worked his way up to become a chef and restaurateur in Wisconsin and neighboring states. He became also active in the labor movement and acted as a labor organizer for various unions.

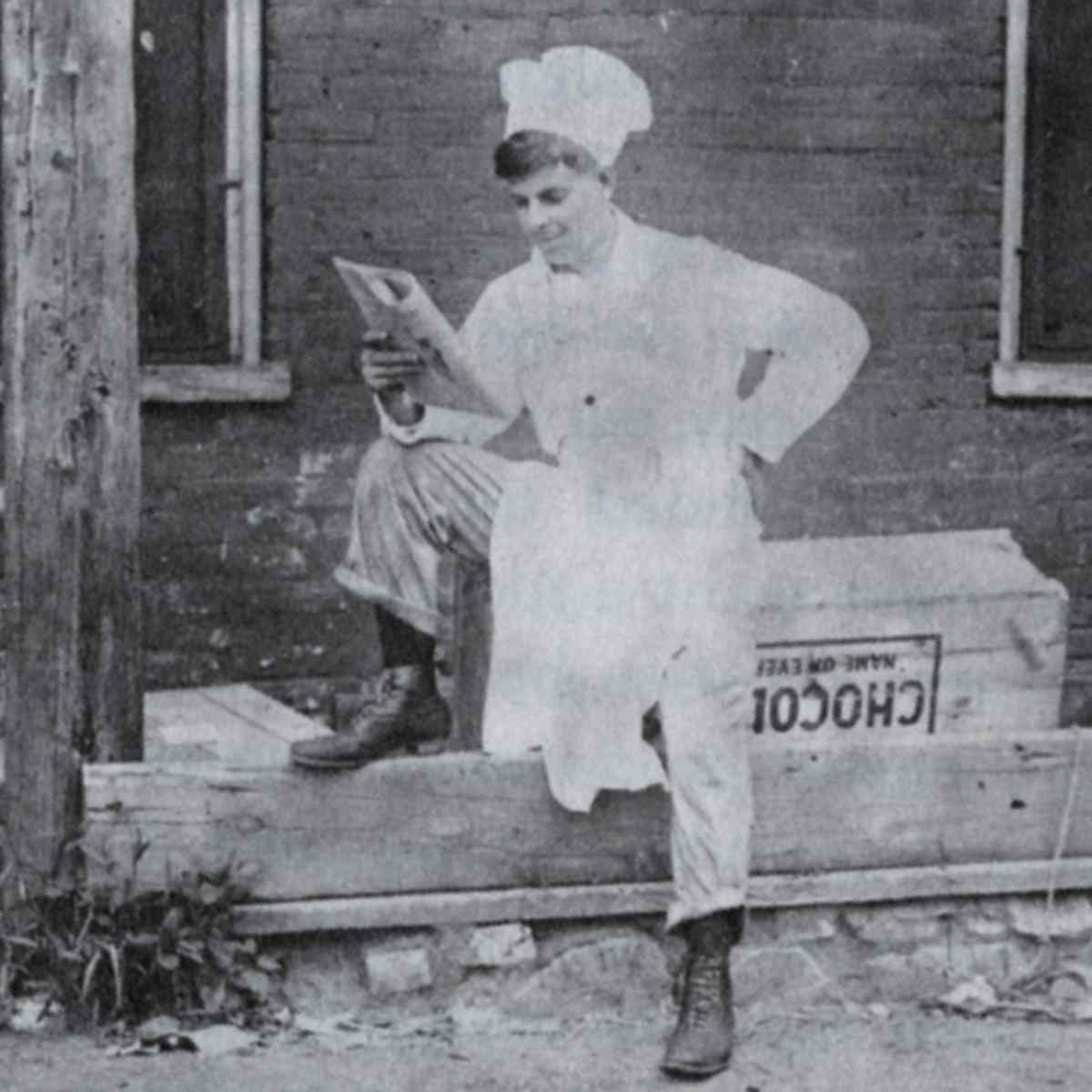
Marth posing for a photo in a chef's hat

== Politics ==
After long activity in Marathon County politics, and election to the Wisconsin Socialist Party executive committee, Marth was first elected to the State Assembly's second Marathon County district by a three-to-one margin in a special election in January 1918 to succeed Republican D. S. Burnett (who had resigned to enter military service). At the November general election he was re-elected, with 1883 votes to 1313 for Republican Fred Paulus, 1203 for Democrat George Merisette, and 40 for independent F. A. Wilcox. He served on the Committee on Taxation.

In 1920, after narrowly losing a hard-fought race for mayor of Wausau by 246 votes in September, Marth was defeated for re-election to the Assembly by Republican Lewis H. Cook, who received 5084 votes, to 3204 for Marth and 1100 for Democrat Kurt Beyreis. He continued to serve on the executive committee of the Wisconsin Socialist Party until 1935, and remained an outspoken Socialist his whole life.

In 1946, he was the Socialist nominee for Wisconsin's 25th State Senate district (Lincoln and Marathon counties); he came third, with 601 votes to 16,859 for Republican Clifford "Tiny" Krueger and 7,827 write-in votes for the incumbent, Republican William McNeight, who had lost to Krueger in the primary election.

== Personal life ==
On April 7, 1915, Marth was married in Wausau to Laura Tank. Together they had three sons and one daughter.

After leaving the legislator, he continued to work as a cook at various local establishments (he no longer owned the Delmonica restaurant as of 1920), but later went to work in factory jobs.

Marth died at the age of 90 at his home on March 11, 1970. He is buried in Pine Grove Cemetery in Wausau.
