= John Q. Adams (Wisconsin politician) =

19th century American politician

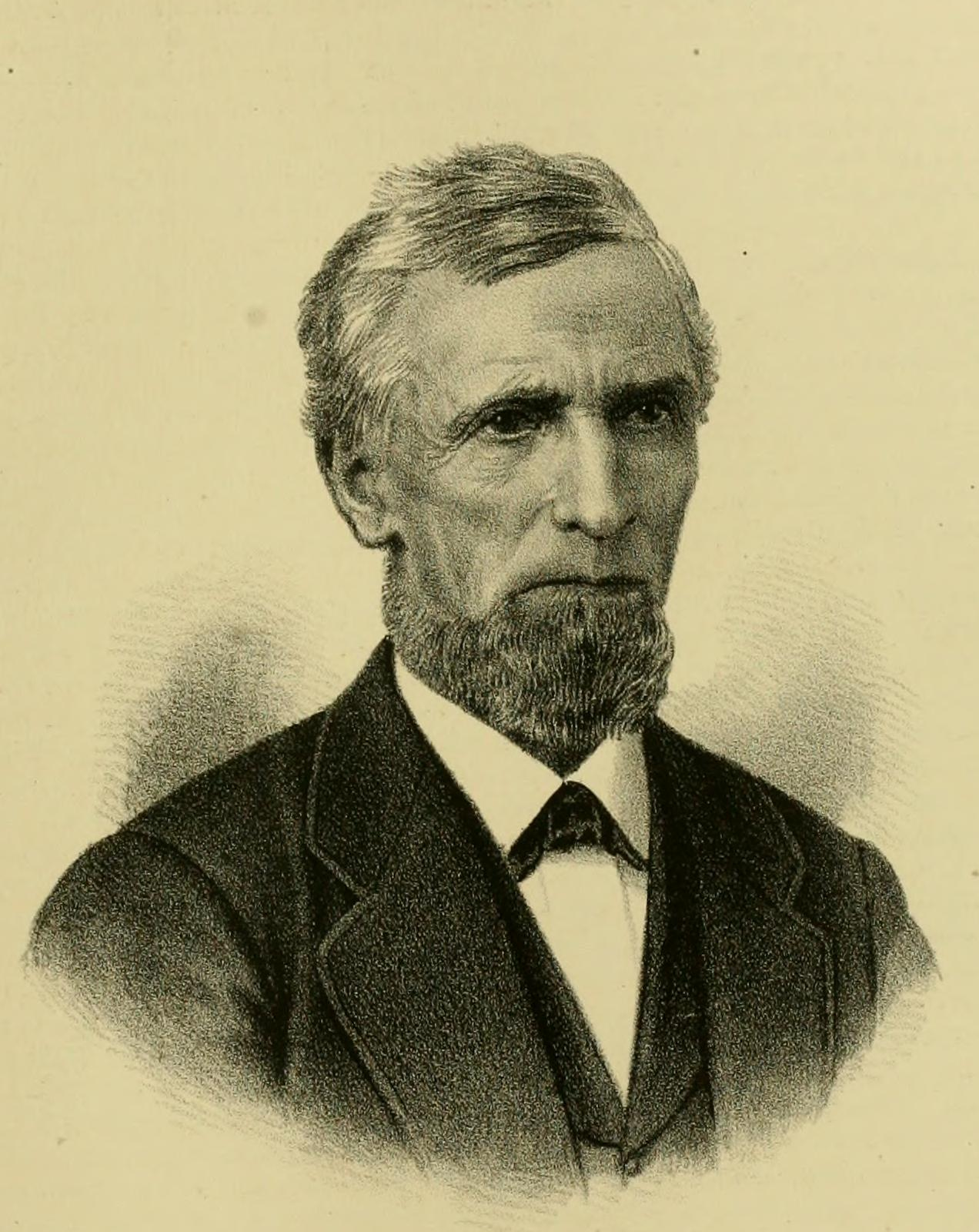
- Portrait from The History of Columbia County, Wisconsin (1880)

Member of the Wisconsin Senate from the 25th district
- In office January 2, 1854 – January 5, 1857
- Preceded by: James T. Lewis
- Succeeded by: Moses M. Davis

Member of the Wisconsin State Assembly from the Columbia 2nd district
- In office January 5, 1863 – January 4, 1864
- Preceded by: William Dutcher
- Succeeded by: Edwin W. McNitt
- In office January 3, 1853 – January 2, 1854
- Preceded by: James T. Lewis (whole county)
- Succeeded by: Alfred Topliff

Personal details
- Born: October 5, 1816 Ashfield, Massachusetts, U.S.
- Died: March 17, 1895 (aged 78) Columbus, Wisconsin, U.S.
- Resting place: Hillside Cemetery, Columbus, Wisconsin
- Party: Republican; Whig (before 1854)
- Spouse: Lucy S. Pomeroy (m. 1846–1895)
- Parents: Charles Adams (father); Polly (Howes) Adams (mother)
- Profession: Teacher, politician

John Quincy Adams (October 5, 1816 – March 17, 1895) was an American educator, Republican politician, and Wisconsin pioneer. He represented Columbia County for three years in the Wisconsin Senate (1854–1857), and for two years in the state Assembly (1853, 1863).

== Biography ==
Adams was born in Ashfield, Massachusetts, the son of Charles Adams and Polly (née Howes). He was educated in the common schools and became a teacher. He moved to Fountain Prairie, Wisconsin, in 1844, and served on the Columbia County and Fountain Prairie town boards as the Columbia County treasurer and the Fountain Prairie town superintendent of schools. Adams also served on the Columbus school board and other offices.

He served as a Republican member of the Wisconsin State Assembly in 1853 and 1863, and was a member of the Wisconsin State Senate from 1854 to 1856. He represented Columbia County, Wisconsin.

Adams died on March 17, 1895, in Columbus.

== Personal life ==
Adams married Lucy S. Pomeroy on June 11, 1846, and they had ten children. He and his family were Congregationalists.

Wisconsin State Assembly
Preceded by James T. Lewis (whole county)	Member of the Wisconsin State Assembly from the Columbia 2nd district January 3, 1853 – January 2, 1854	Succeeded by Alfred Topliff
Preceded by William Dutcher	Member of the Wisconsin State Assembly from the Columbia 2nd district January 5, 1863 – January 4, 1864	Succeeded by Edwin W. McNitt
Wisconsin Senate
Preceded by James T. Lewis	Member of the Wisconsin Senate from the 25th district January 2, 1854 – January 5, 1857	Succeeded by Moses M. Davis
