= Clifford Krueger =

American politician and businessman (1918–1988)

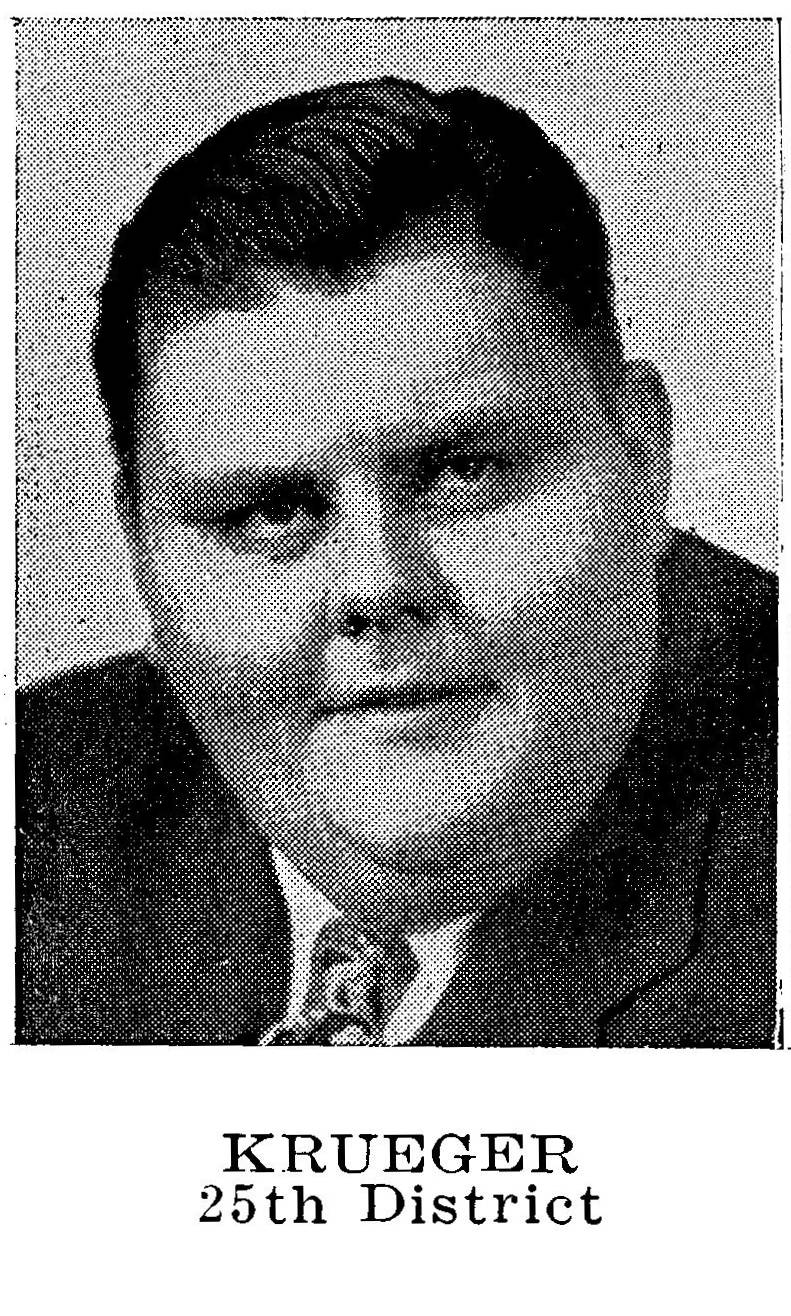
- Krueger c. 1948

Minority leader of the Wisconsin Senate
- In office January 6, 1975 – January 5, 1981
- Preceded by: Fred Risser
- Succeeded by: Walter Chilsen

Member of the Wisconsin Senate
- In office January 7, 1957 – January 3, 1983
- Preceded by: Bernard J. Gehrmann
- Succeeded by: Lloyd H. Kincaid
- Constituency: 12th district
- In office January 6, 1947 – January 3, 1955
- Preceded by: William McNeight
- Succeeded by: Carl Lauri
- Constituency: 25th district

Personal details
- Born: June 24, 1918 Madison, Wisconsin, U.S.
- Died: October 15, 1988 (aged 70) Wausau, Wisconsin, U.S.
- Cause of death: Hepatitis
- Resting place: Merrill Memorial Park, Merrill, Wisconsin
- Party: Republican; Progressive (before 1946)
- Occupation: businessman, circus performer, politician.
- Nickname: Tiny

Clifford W. "Tiny" Krueger (June 24, 1918 – October 15, 1988) was an American politician, businessman, and circus performer from the U.S. state of Wisconsin. He served 34 years in the Wisconsin State Senate representing vast multi-county districts in the northern part of the state.

== Circus career ==
Born in Madison, Wisconsin, Krueger graduated from high school in Merrill, Wisconsin. Krueger was in the Sheboygan-based Seils-Sterling Circus performing as the fat-boy weighing 425 pounds.

== Business and political career ==
Krueger owned a tavern in Merrill, and served on the Merrill Common Council. He was also a member of the Lions Club, and the Farm Bureau.

In 1942, Krueger was the Wisconsin Progressive Party candidate for Wisconsin's 25th State Senate district (having won the Progressive primary election by only twelve votes in a three-way race), losing to Republican William McNeight, with 6512 votes to 11,603 for McNeight and 3,437 for Democrat Donald J. MacCormick. (Republican incumbent Otto Mueller had not been a candidate.)

In 1946, with the Progressive Party having dissolved, he ran in the Republican primary election, defeating McNeight and going on to win the general election against McNeight (running as a write-in candidate) and Socialist former Assemblyman Herman Marth. Krueger drew 16,859 votes, to 7,827 write-in votes McNeight and 601 for Marth. Having defeated two challengers in the 1950 primary, he was re-elected in the general election; but his district was split in the next re-apportionment and his term ended in 1955. In 1956, he returned to the Senate from the new 12th District (Iron, Lincoln, Oneida, Price, Taylor, and Vilas counties), and would hold that office continuously until his 1983 retirement. He was the Senate Minority Leader for the Republicans in the 1975, 1977, and 1979 sessions, but said that some Republicans never really forgave him for having started as a Progressive.

== Later life ==
Krueger retired in 1982. He died of hepatitis in 1988 at age 70 in Wausau, Wisconsin.

Party political offices
Preceded by Frederick H. Rice	Republican nominee for Secretary of State of Wisconsin; 1986	Succeeded by Robert Thompson
Wisconsin Senate
Preceded by William McNeight	Member of the Wisconsin Senate from the 25th district January 6, 1947 – January 3, 1955	Succeeded by Carl Lauri
Preceded by Bernard J. Gehrmann	Member of the Wisconsin Senate from the 12th district January 7, 1957 – January 3, 1983	Succeeded by Lloyd H. Kincaid
