= Wisconsin's 25th Senate district =

American legislative district in northwest Wisconsin

Wisconsin's 25th State Senate district
- 2024 map defined in 2023 Wisc. Act 94; 2022 map defined in Johnson v. Wisconsin Elections Commission; 2011 map was defined in 2011 Wisc. Act 43 composed of Assembly districts 73, 74, and 75
Senator
| Romaine Quinn; R–Cameron |
since January 3, 2023 (3 years, 81 days)
- Demographics: 89.83% White; 0.91% Black; 1.41% Hispanic; 0.68% Asian; 6.42% Native American; 0.1% Hawaiian/Pacific Islander
- Population (2020) • Voting age: 178,879; 144,476
- Website: Official website
- Notes: Far northwest Wisconsin

The 25th Senate district of Wisconsin is one of 33 districts in the Wisconsin Senate. Located in northwest Wisconsin, where Wisconsin meets Lake Superior, the district comprises all of Ashland, Bayfield, Burnett, Douglas, Iron, Polk, Sawyer, and Washburn counties. It contains the cities of Superior, Ashland, Bayfield, Hayward, Spooner, and Washburn. The district also includes the Bad River Indian reservation and the Chequamegon–Nicolet National Forest.

== Current elected officials ==
Romaine Quinn is the senator representing the 25th district since January 2023. He previously served in the State Assembly, representing the 75th Assembly district from 2015 to 2021, and was mayor of Rice Lake from 2010 through 2012. After the 2024 redistricting, Quinn moved to Birchwood and now resides in the new district.

Each Wisconsin State Senate district is composed of three Wisconsin State Assembly districts. The 25th Senate district comprises the 73rd, 74th, and 75th Assembly districts. The current representatives of those districts are:

- Assembly District 73: Angela Stroud (D–Ashland)
- Assembly District 74: Chanz Green (R–Grandview)
- Assembly District 75: Duke Tucker (R–Grantsburg)

The district is located entirely within Wisconsin's 7th congressional district, which is currently represented by U.S. Representative Tom Tiffany.

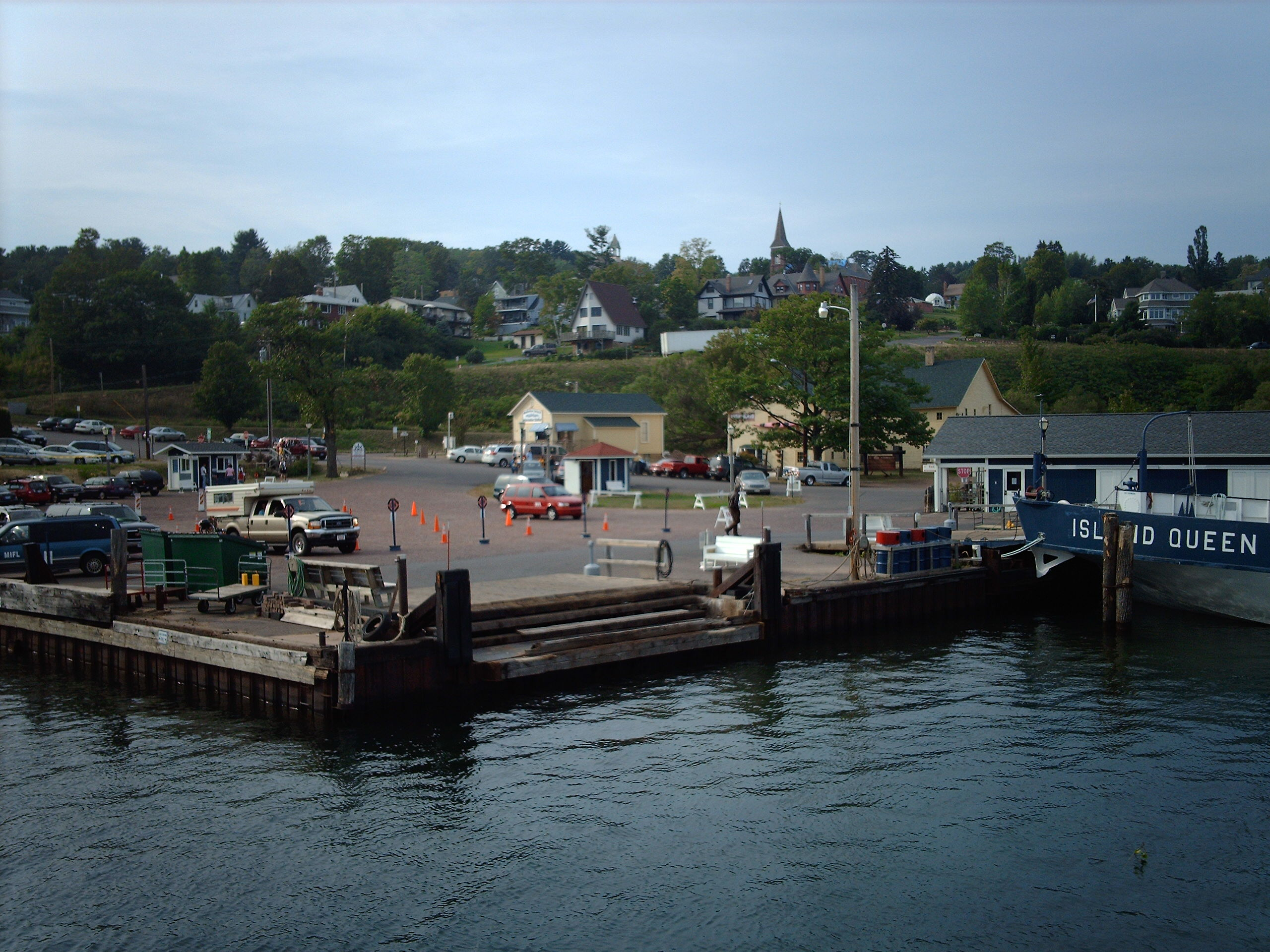
Harbor at Bayfield

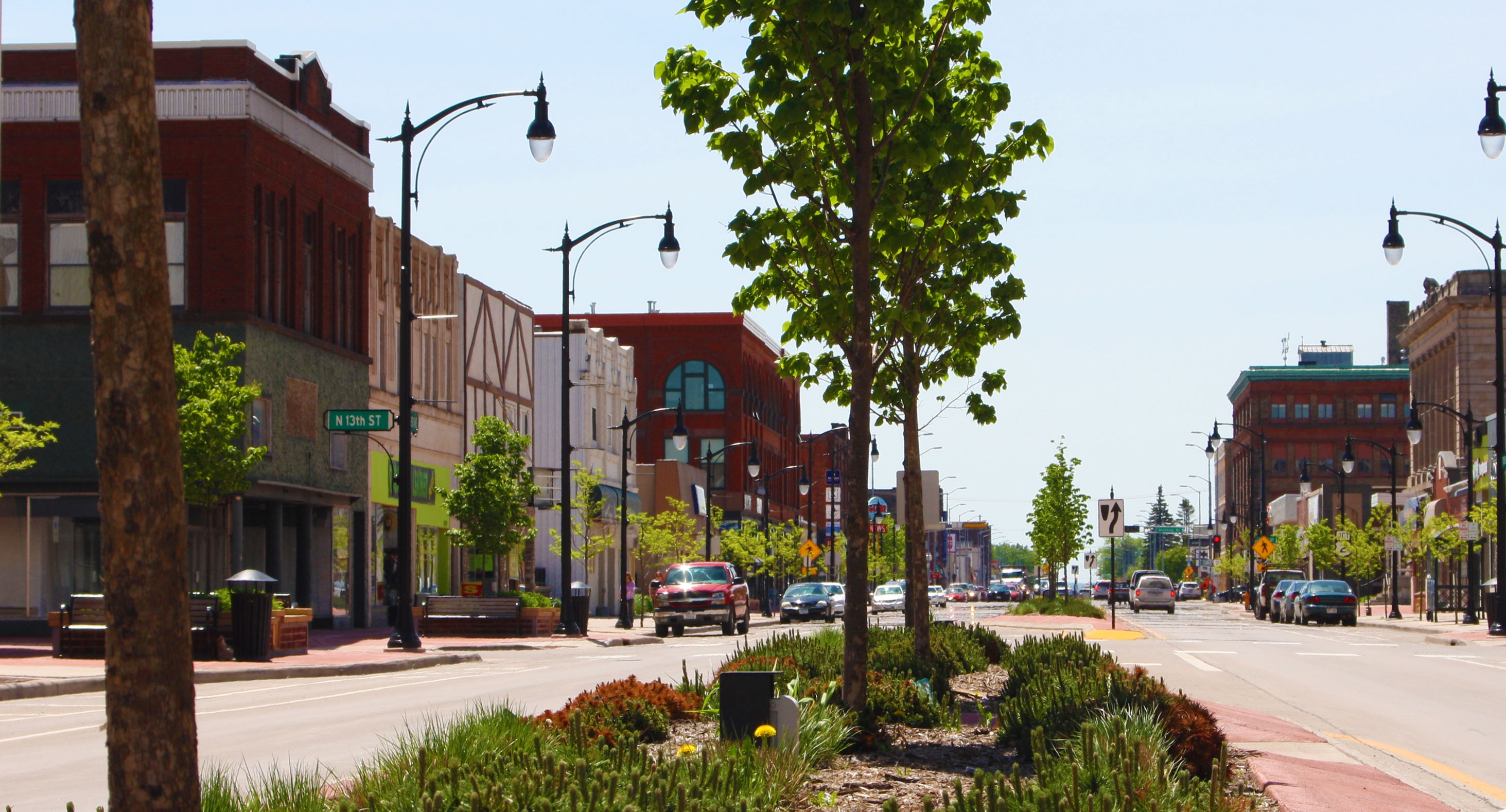
Tower Avenue in downtown Superior

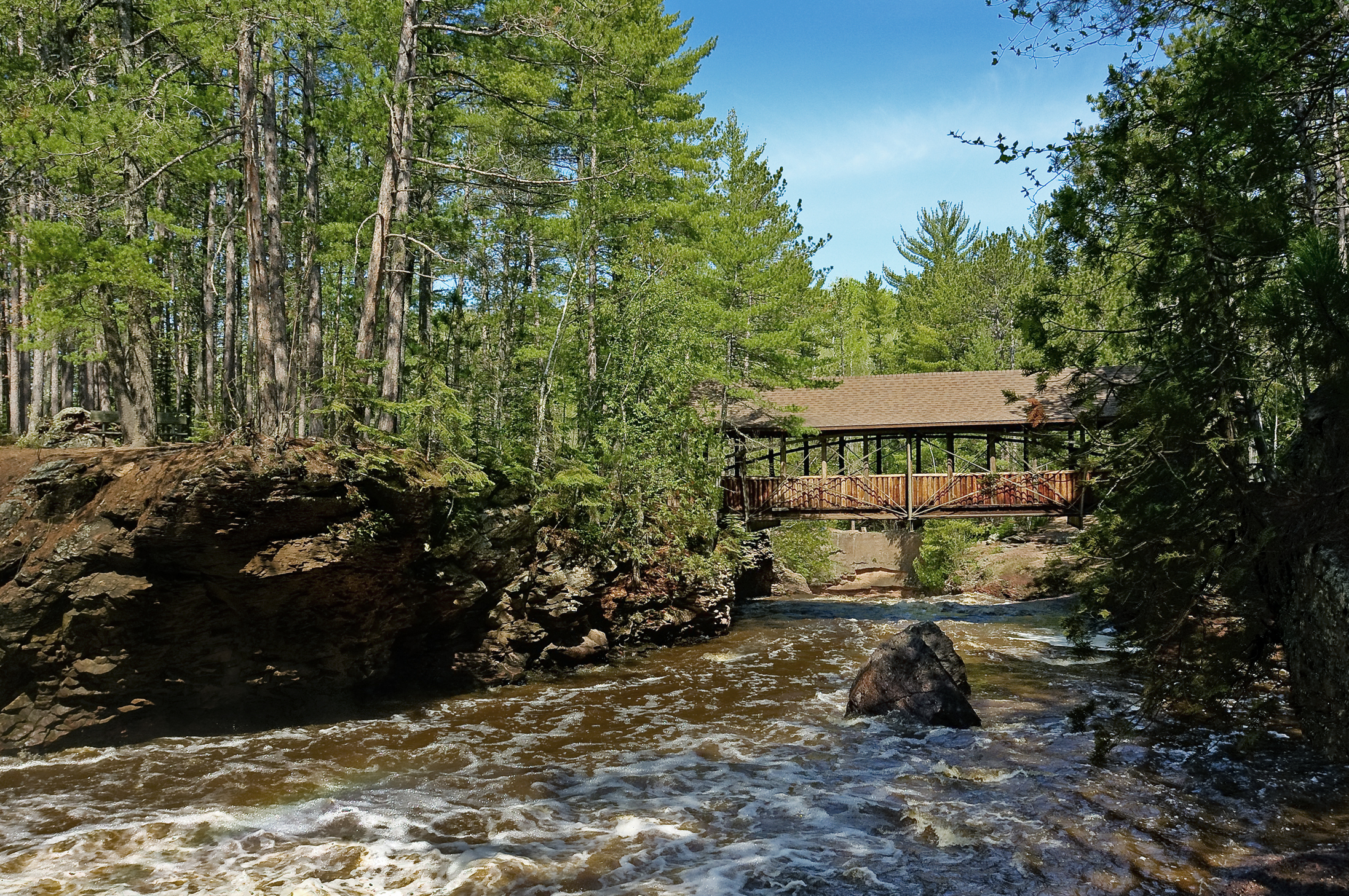
Amnicon Falls State Park

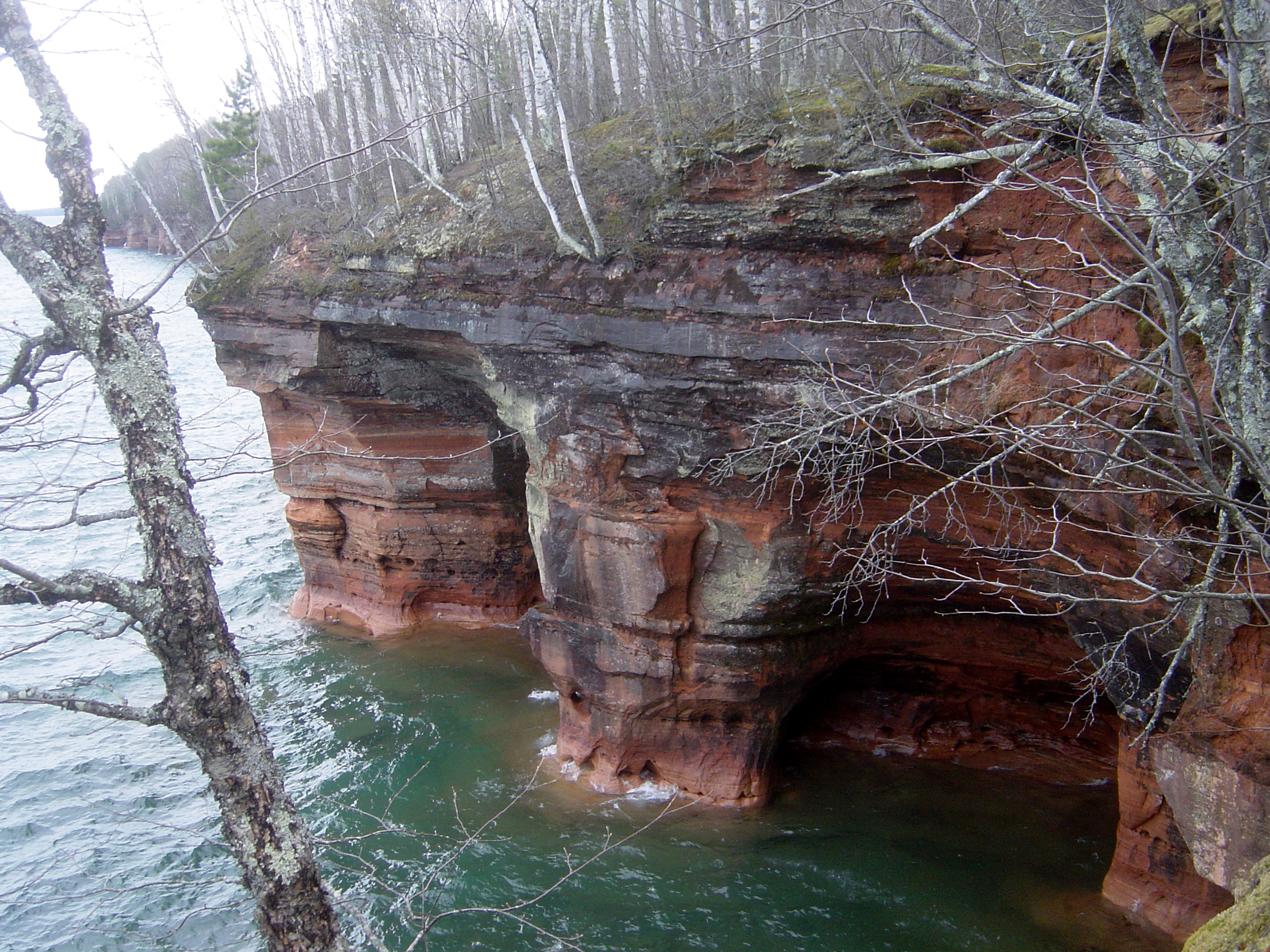
Mawikwe Bay Sea Caves in the Apostle Islands National Lakeshore

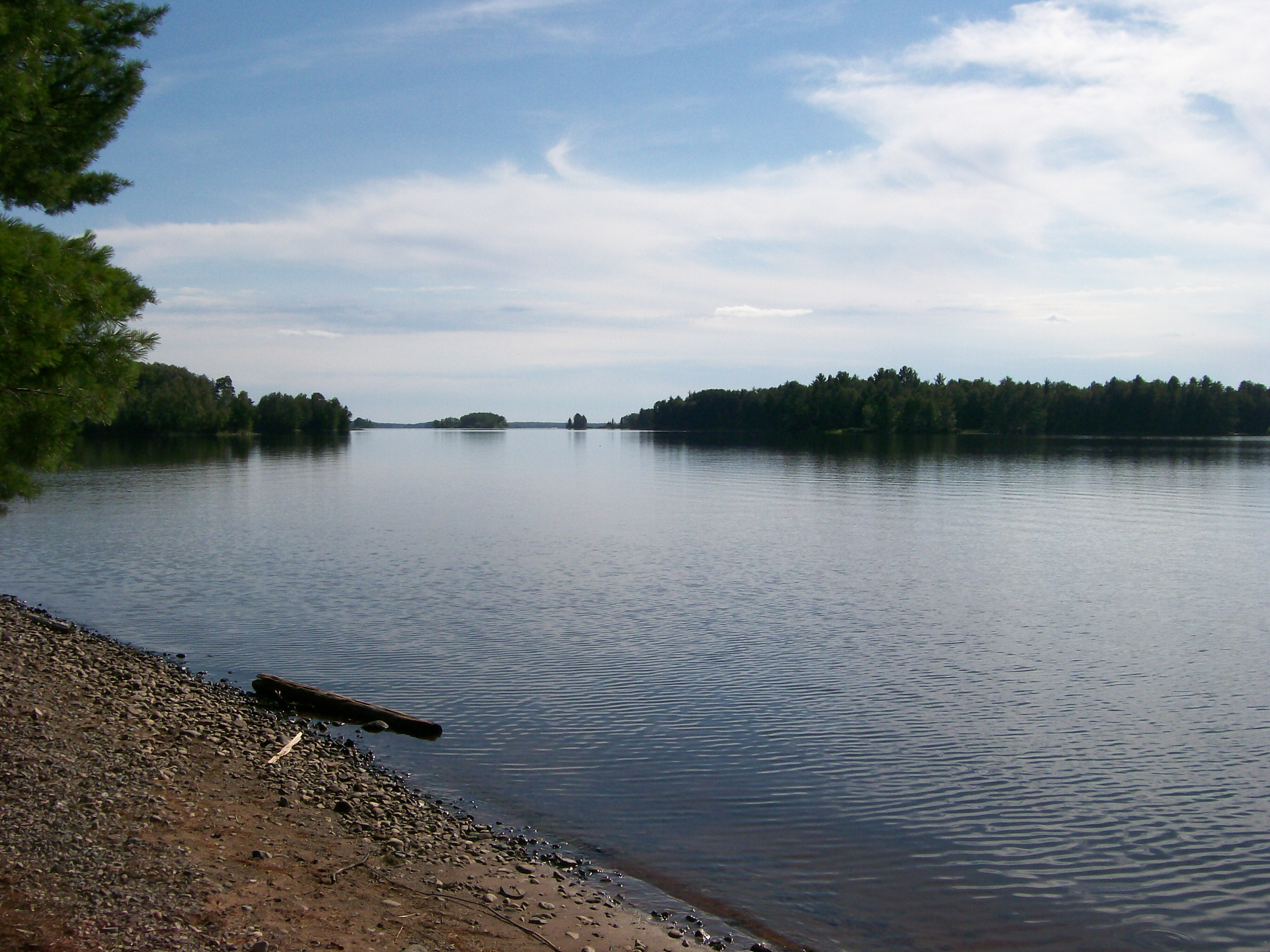
Turtle-Flambeau Flowage

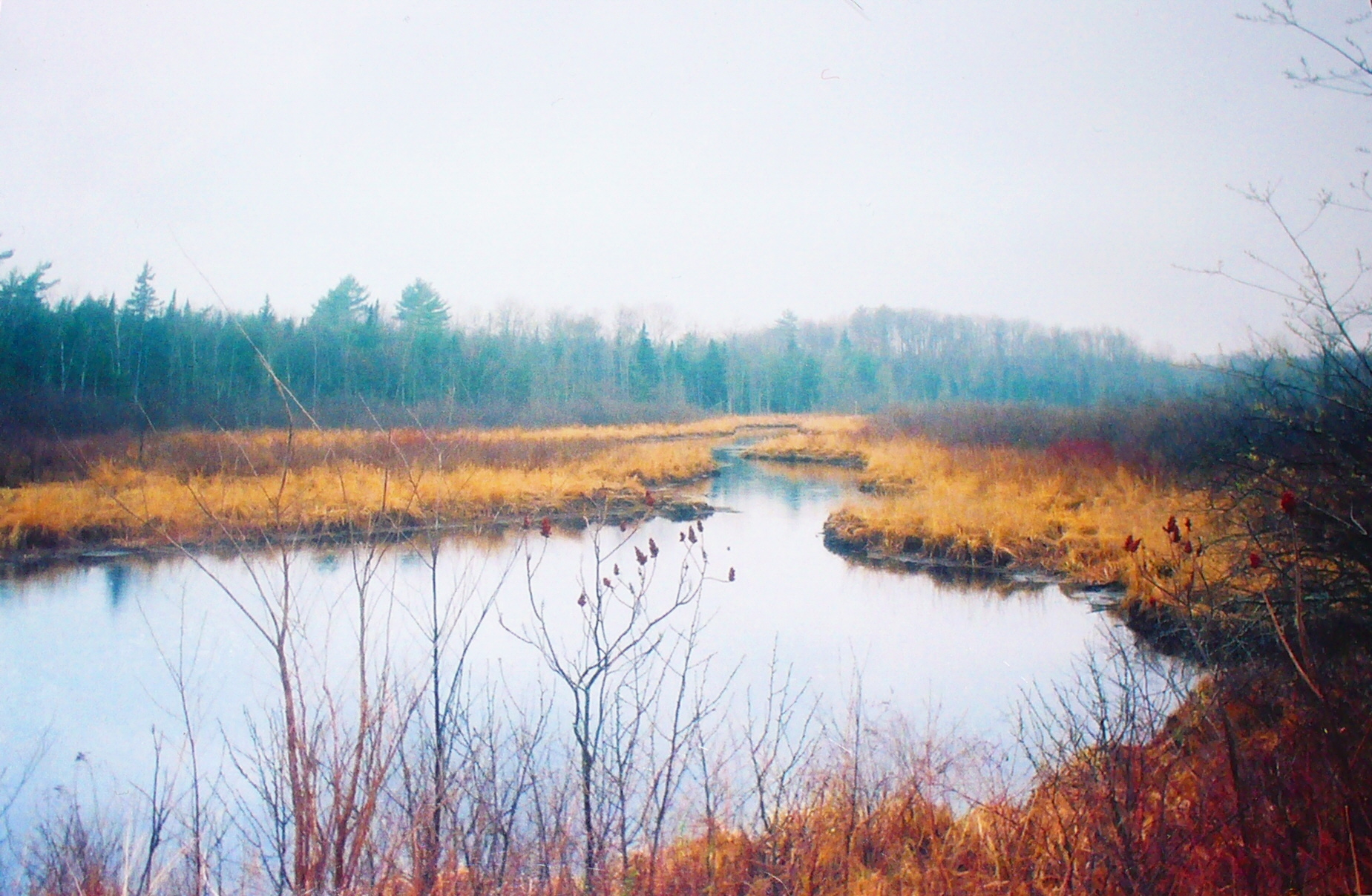
Near Clam Lake in Chequamegon National Forest

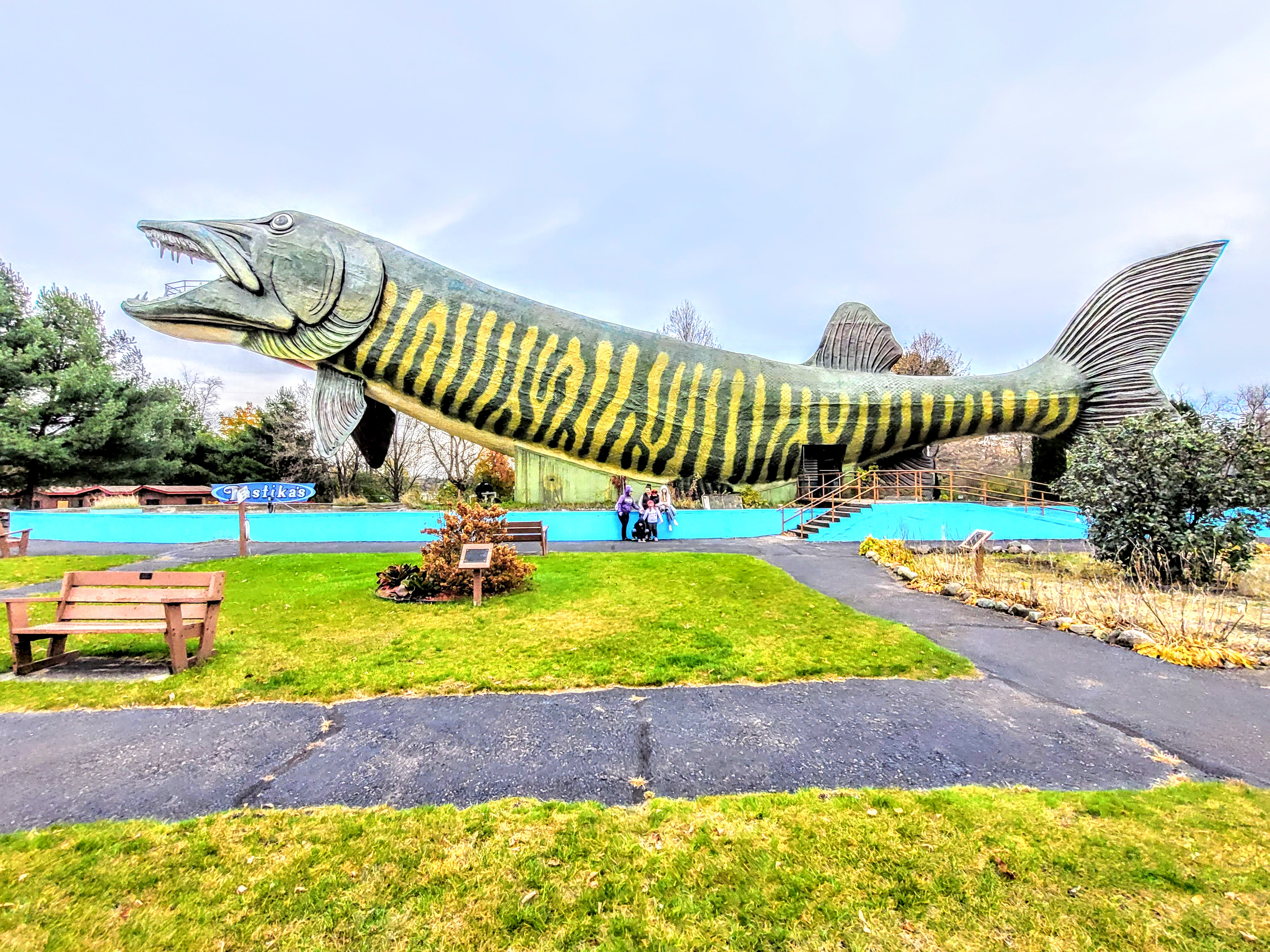
World's largest Muskie at the National Fresh Water Fishing Hall of Fame

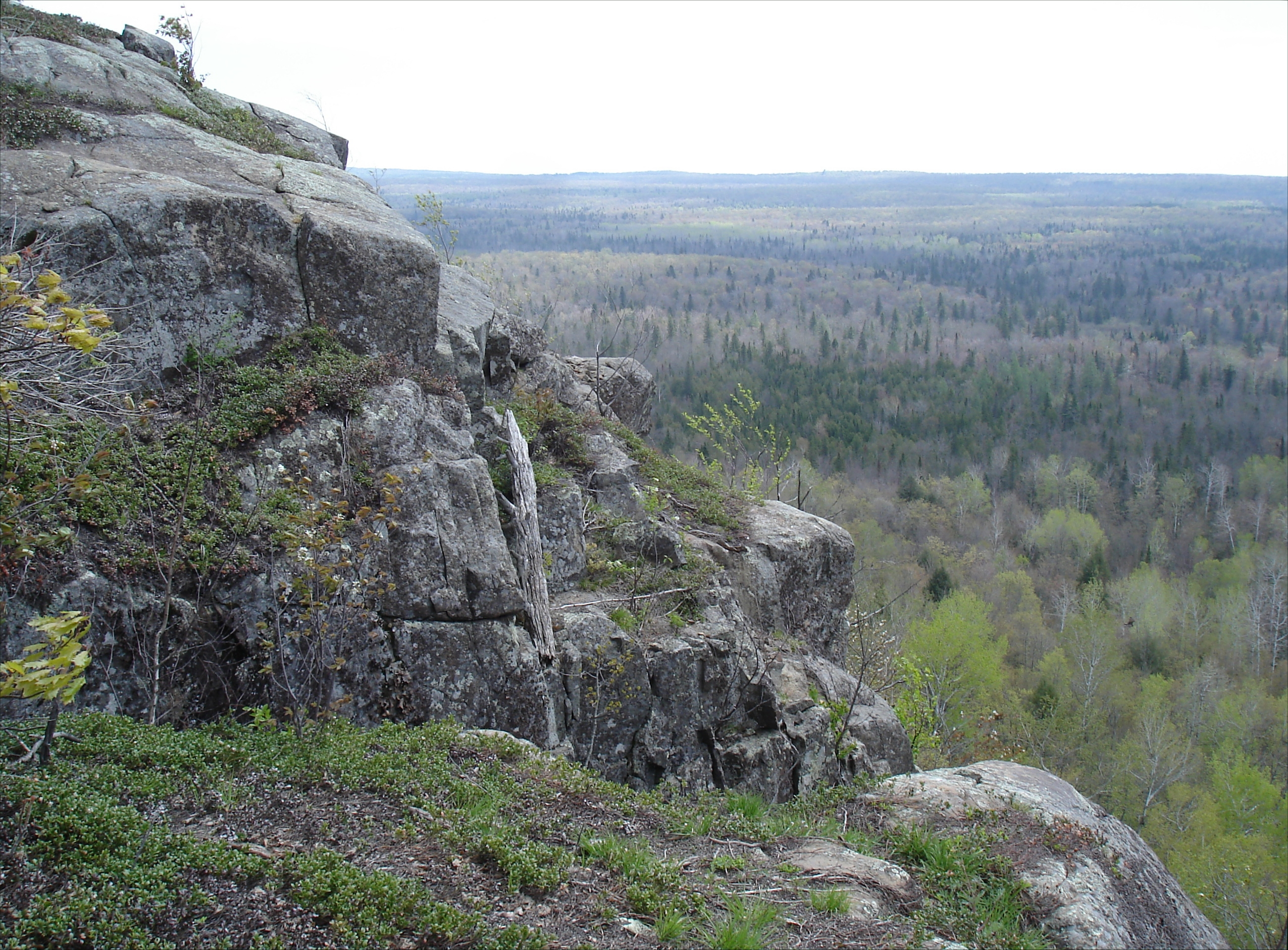
Penokee Bluff in Iron County Forest

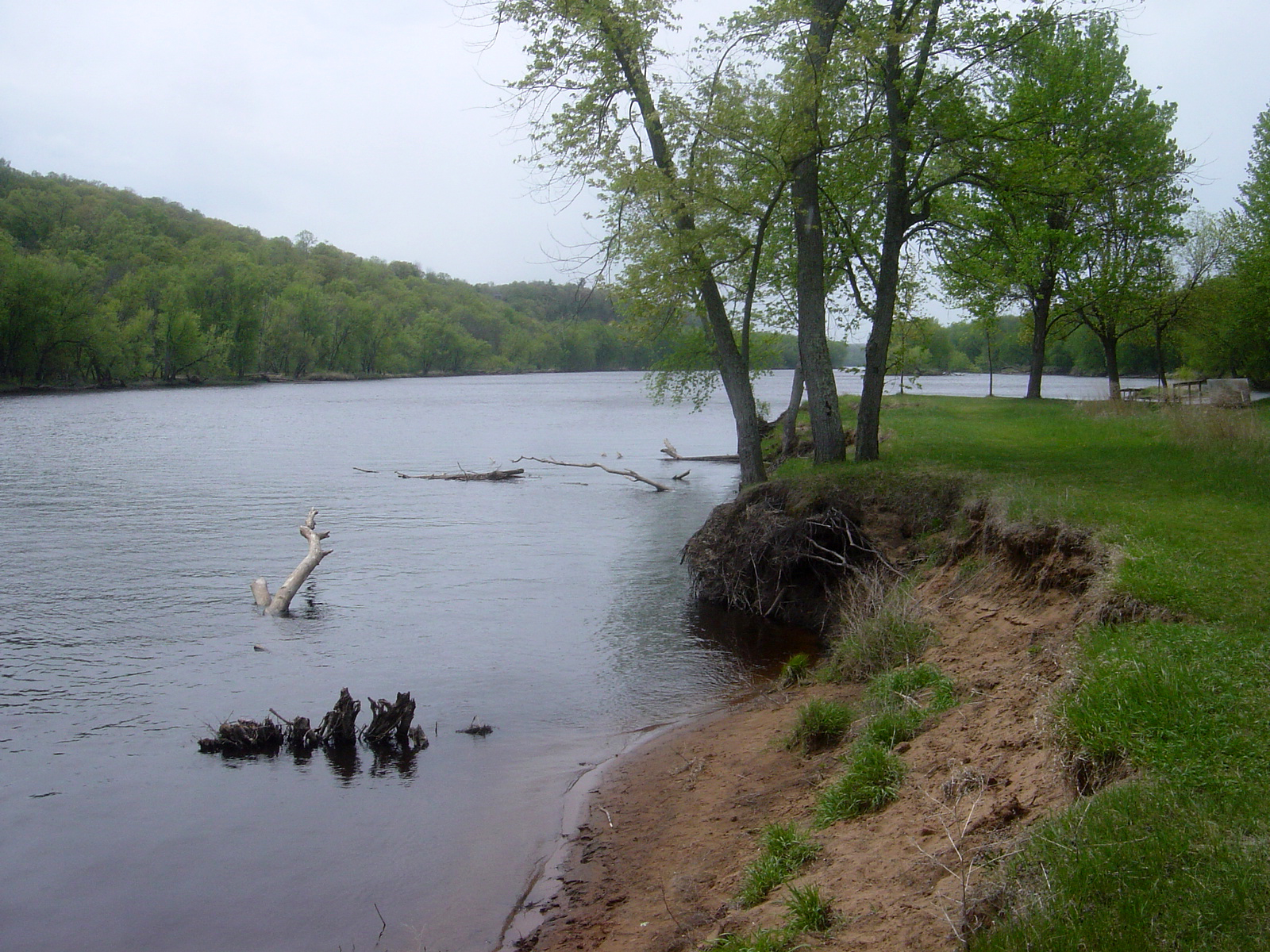
Saint Croix National Scenic Riverway near Osceola, Wisconsin

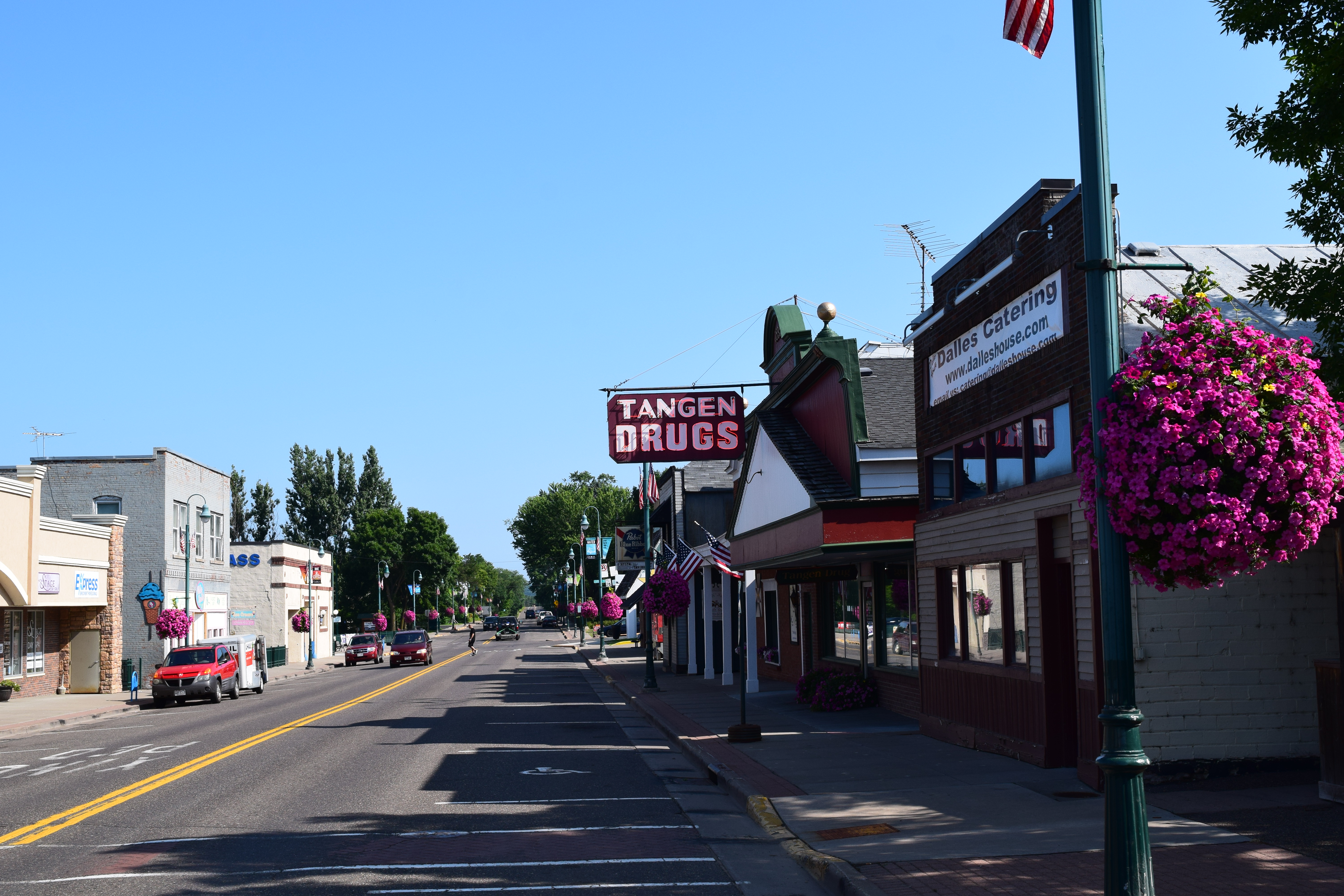
downtown St. Croix Falls

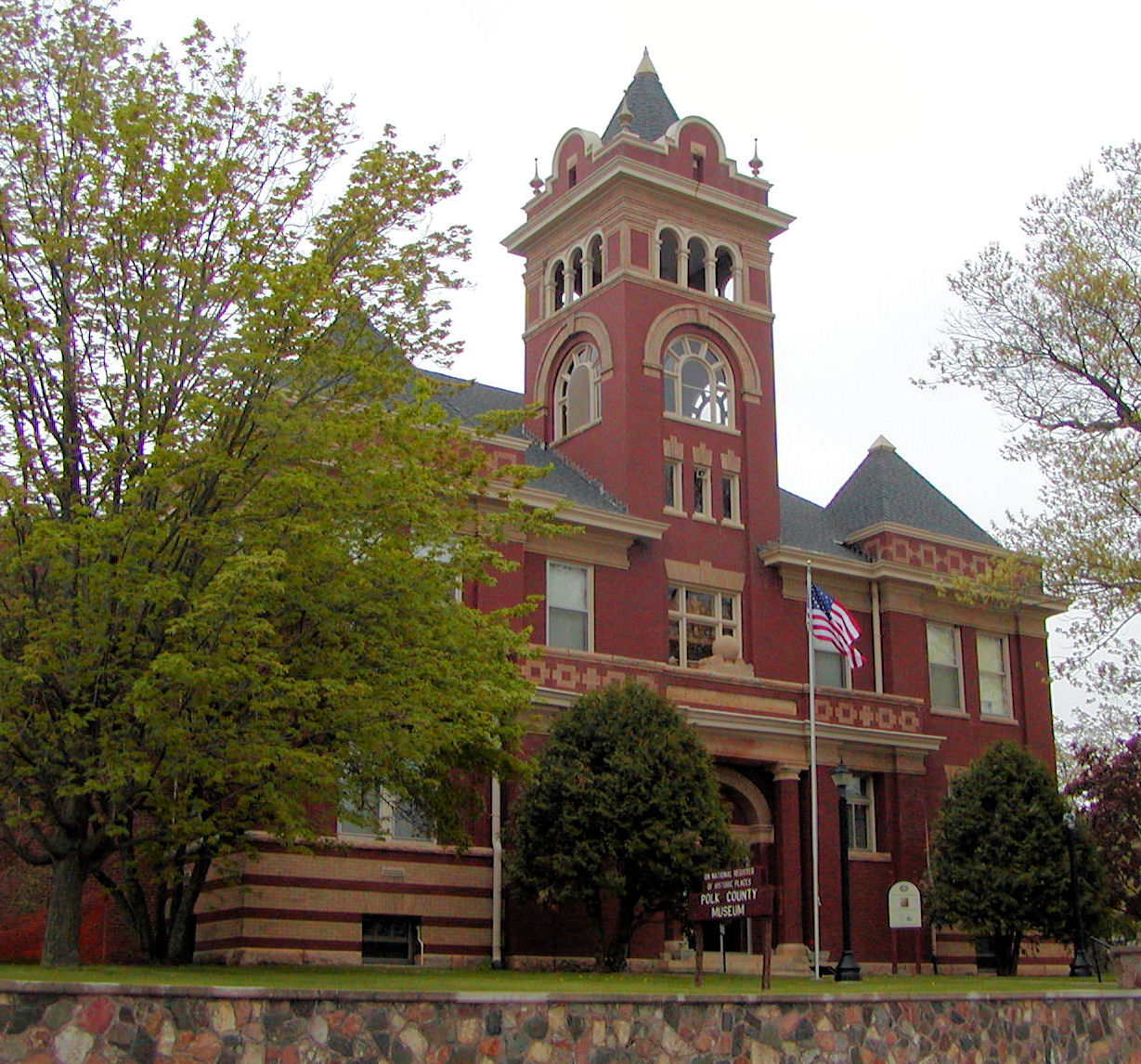
Polk County Courthouse

== History ==
The boundaries of districts have changed over history. Previous politicians of a specific numbered district have represented a different geographic area, due to redistricting.

After the fifth (1852) session of the state legislature, the Wisconsin Senate was expanded to 25 members. The first member for the 25th District was James T. Lewis, of Columbus (later a Governor of Wisconsin). The district at that time consisted of Columbia County. This was true until 1872, when the district became the counties of the counties of Green Lake, Marquette and Waushara (Columbia County was now the Twenty-Seventh District).

In 1876, the Senate was again redistricted: the Twenty-Fifth now consisted of the City of Madison, and various other Towns and Villages in Dane County, Wisconsin (more or less the previous Seventh District); while what had been the 25th was now the Ninth District.

In 1883, the Twenty-Fifth now consisted of Eau Claire, Pepin and Pierce Counties (three of the eleven counties which had made up the Seventh District); Dane County became the Twenty-Sixth District.

From 1887 to 1891, the district consisted of Clark and Eau Claire Counties. The short-lived redistricting of 1891 left the district consisting of Clark, Price, Taylor, and Wood Counties. From 1892 to 1895, the district once again consisted of Clark and Eau Claire Counties. From 1896 to 1910, the district consisted of Clark and Marathon Counties. From 1911 to 1922, the district consisted of Langlade and Marathon Counties. From 1923 to 1954, the district consisted of Lincoln and Marathon Counties.

After the 1954 redistricting, the district had completely changed, and now consisted of Ashland, Bayfield, and Douglas Counties (Lincoln and Marathon Counties had been split between the new 12th and 29th Districts). The 1960 federal census showed that this district, at 74,293 people, was the least populous of Wisconsin's 33 districts, 38.0% below the average; in the wake of Baker v. Carr, a redistricting would be necessary. After a great deal of litigation, the Wisconsin Supreme Court created a redistricting map promulgated on May 14, 1964. The new Twenty-Fifth District added Iron, Price, Rusk and Sawyer Counties to the district. The 1972 redistricting took away Rusk County and a southern portion of Price County, adding the eastern part of Barron County instead; but left the district mostly unchanged. The 1982 redistricting removed Price County entirely, and modified the Barron County portion, as well as adding one Rusk County township. In 1992, the latest court-ordered redistricting added the remainder of Barron County, while dropping the Rusk County township once more. The 2002 court-ordered redistricting added part of Burnett County for the first time, while taking away segments of Sawyer and Barron Counties. The new 2011 redistricting bill took away most of Sawyer, but added for the first time a single township in Vilas County, and a township from both Dunn and Saint Croix Counties, and Price County in whole.

== Past senators ==
The district has previously been represented by:

Note: the boundaries of districts have changed repeatedly over history. Previous politicians of a specific numbered district have represented a completely different geographic area, due to redistricting.

| Senator | Party | Notes | Session | Years | District Definition |
|---|---|---|---|---|---|
| District created by 1852 Wisc. Act 499. | | | | 1852 | WI Senate District 25, 1852-1871 Columbia County |
| James T. Lewis | Dem. | Resigned 1853 after elected Lieutenant Governor of Wisconsin. | 6th | 1853 | WI Senate District 25, 1852-1871 Columbia County |
| John Q. Adams | Dem. | Won 1853 special election. | 7th | 1854 | WI Senate District 25, 1852-1871 Columbia County |
| John Q. Adams | Rep. | Won 1853 special election. | 8th | 1855 | WI Senate District 25, 1852-1871 Columbia County |
| John Q. Adams | Rep. | Won 1853 special election. | 9th | 1856 | WI Senate District 25, 1852-1871 Columbia County |
| Moses M. Davis | Rep. | | 10th | 1857 | WI Senate District 25, 1852-1871 Columbia County |
| Moses M. Davis | Rep. | | 11th | 1858 | WI Senate District 25, 1852-1871 Columbia County |
| Moses M. Davis | Rep. | | 12th | 1859 | WI Senate District 25, 1852-1871 Columbia County |
| Moses M. Davis | Rep. | | 13th | 1860 | WI Senate District 25, 1852-1871 Columbia County |
| G. W. Hazelton | Rep. | | 14th | 1861 | WI Senate District 25, 1852-1871 Columbia County |
| G. W. Hazelton | Rep. | | 15th | 1862 | WI Senate District 25, 1852-1871 Columbia County |
| Jonathan Bowman | Rep. | | 16th | 1863 | WI Senate District 25, 1852-1871 Columbia County |
| Jonathan Bowman | Rep. | | 17th | 1864 | WI Senate District 25, 1852-1871 Columbia County |
| Jonathan Bowman | Natl. Union | | 18th | 1865 | WI Senate District 25, 1852-1871 Columbia County |
| Jonathan Bowman | Natl. Union | | 19th | 1866 | WI Senate District 25, 1852-1871 Columbia County |
| Robert B. Sanderson | Natl. Union | | 20th | 1867 | WI Senate District 25, 1852-1871 Columbia County |
| Robert B. Sanderson | Rep. | | 21st | 1868 | WI Senate District 25, 1852-1871 Columbia County |
| William M. Griswold | Rep. | Redistricted to 27th district. | 22nd | 1869 | WI Senate District 25, 1852-1871 Columbia County |
| William M. Griswold | Rep. | Redistricted to 27th district. | 23rd | 1870 | WI Senate District 25, 1852-1871 Columbia County |
| William M. Griswold | Rep. | Redistricted to 27th district. | 24th | 1871 | WI Senate District 25, 1852-1871 Columbia County |
| Waldo Flint | Rep. | Redistricted from 29th district. | 25th | 1872 | Green Lake, Marquette, and Waushara counties |
| Robert L. D. Potter | Rep. | | 26th | 1873 | Green Lake, Marquette, and Waushara counties |
| Robert L. D. Potter | Rep. | | 27th | 1874 | Green Lake, Marquette, and Waushara counties |
| Robert L. D. Potter | Rep. | | 28th | 1875 | Green Lake, Marquette, and Waushara counties |
| Robert L. D. Potter | Rep. | | 29th | 1876 | Green Lake, Marquette, and Waushara counties |
| George B. Burrows | Rep. | | 30th | 1877 | Eastern Dane County |
| George B. Burrows | Rep. | | 31st | 1878 | Eastern Dane County |
| George B. Burrows | Rep. | | 32nd | 1879 | Eastern Dane County |
| George B. Burrows | Rep. | | 33rd | 1880 | Eastern Dane County |
| George B. Burrows | Rep. | | 34th | 1881 | Eastern Dane County |
| George B. Burrows | Rep. | | 35th | 1882 | Eau Claire, Pepin, and Pierce counties 1880 population: 43,962 |
| Hans Warner | Rep. | | 36th | 1883–1884 | Eau Claire, Pepin, and Pierce counties 1880 population: 43,962 |
| Hans Warner | Rep. | | 37th | 1885–1886 | Eau Claire, Pepin, and Pierce counties 1880 population: 43,962 |
| William A. Rust | Rep. | | 38th | 1887–1888 | Eau Claire, Pepin, and Pierce counties 1880 population: 43,962 |
| William A. Rust | Rep. | | 39th | 1889–1890 | Clark and Eau Claire counties 1890 population: 48,331 |
| Robert MacBride | Rep. | | 40th | 1891–1892 | Clark and Eau Claire counties 1890 population: 48,331 |
| Robert MacBride | Rep. | | 41st | 1893–1894 | Clark and Eau Claire counties 1890 population: 48,331 |
| Clarion A. Youmans | Rep. | | 42nd | 1895–1896 | Clark and Eau Claire counties 1890 population: 48,331 |
| Clarion A. Youmans | Rep. | | 43rd | 1897–1898 | Clark and Marathon counties 1895 population: 57,940; 1900 population: 69,104 |
| Andrew L. Kreutzer | Rep. | | 44th | 1899–1900 | Clark and Marathon counties 1895 population: 57,940; 1900 population: 69,104 |
| Andrew L. Kreutzer | Rep. | | 45th | 1901–1902 | Clark and Marathon counties 1895 population: 57,940; 1900 population: 69,104 |
| Andrew L. Kreutzer | Rep. | | 46th | 1903–1904 | Clark and Marathon counties 1895 population: 57,940; 1900 population: 69,104 |
| Andrew L. Kreutzer | Rep. | | 47th | 1905–1906 | Clark and Marathon counties 1895 population: 57,940; 1900 population: 69,104 |
| Spencer M. Marsh | Rep. | | 48th | 1907–1908 | Clark and Marathon counties 1895 population: 57,940; 1900 population: 69,104 |
| Spencer M. Marsh | Rep. | | 49th | 1909–1910 | Clark and Marathon counties 1895 population: 57,940; 1900 population: 69,104 |
| W. W. Albers | Dem. | | 50th | 1911–1912 | Clark and Marathon counties 1895 population: 57,940; 1900 population: 69,104 |
| W. W. Albers | Dem. | | 51st | 1913–1914 | Langlade and Marathon counties 1910 population: 72,116 |
| W. W. Albers | Dem. | | 52nd | 1915–1916 | Langlade and Marathon counties 1910 population: 72,116 |
| W. W. Albers | Dem. | | 53rd | 1917–1918 | Langlade and Marathon counties 1910 population: 72,116 |
| Claire B. Bird | Rep. | | 54th | 1919–1920 | Langlade and Marathon counties 1910 population: 72,116 |
| Claire B. Bird | Rep. | | 55th | 1921–1922 | Langlade and Marathon counties 1910 population: 72,116 |
| Joseph L. Barber | Rep. | | 56th | 1923–1924 | Lincoln and Marathon counties |
| Joseph L. Barber | Rep. | | 57th | 1925–1926 | Lincoln and Marathon counties |
| Otto Mueller | Rep. | | 58th | 1927–1928 | Lincoln and Marathon counties |
| Otto Mueller | Rep. | | 59th | 1929–1930 | Lincoln and Marathon counties |
| Otto Mueller | Rep. | | 60th | 1931–1932 | Lincoln and Marathon counties |
| Otto Mueller | Rep. | | 61st | 1933–1934 | Lincoln and Marathon counties |
| Roland E. Kannenberg | Prog. | | 62nd | 1935–1936 | Lincoln and Marathon counties |
| Roland E. Kannenberg | Prog. | | 63rd | 1937–1938 | Lincoln and Marathon counties |
| Otto Mueller | Rep. | | 64th | 1939–1940 | Lincoln and Marathon counties |
| Otto Mueller | Rep. | | 65th | 1941–1942 | Lincoln and Marathon counties |
| William McNeight | Rep. | | 66th | 1943–1944 | Lincoln and Marathon counties |
| William McNeight | Rep. | | 67th | 1945–1946 | Lincoln and Marathon counties |
| Clifford Krueger | Rep. | | 68th | 1947–1948 | Lincoln and Marathon counties |
| Clifford Krueger | Rep. | | 69th | 1949–1950 | Lincoln and Marathon counties |
| Clifford Krueger | Rep. | | 70th | 1951–1952 | Lincoln and Marathon counties |
| Clifford Krueger | Rep. | | 71st | 1953–1954 | Lincoln and Marathon counties |
| Carl Lauri | Dem. | | 72nd | 1955–1956 | Ashland, Bayfield, and Douglas counties |
| Carl Lauri | Dem. | | 73rd | 1957–1958 | Ashland, Bayfield, and Douglas counties |
| Carl Lauri | Dem. | | 74th | 1959–1960 | Ashland, Bayfield, and Douglas counties |
| Carl Lauri | Dem. | | 75th | 1961–1962 | Ashland, Bayfield, and Douglas counties |
| Frank Christopherson Jr. | Dem. | | 76th | 1963–1964 | Ashland, Bayfield, and Douglas counties |
| Frank Christopherson Jr. | Dem. | | 77th | 1965–1966 | Ashland, Bayfield, Douglas, Iron, Price, Rusk, and Sawyer counties |
| Arthur Cirilli | Rep. | Resigned July 1972 after appointed Wisconsin circuit court judge. | 78th | 1967–1968 | Ashland, Bayfield, Douglas, Iron, Price, Rusk, and Sawyer counties |
| Arthur Cirilli | Rep. | Resigned July 1972 after appointed Wisconsin circuit court judge. | 79th | 1969–1970 | Ashland, Bayfield, Douglas, Iron, Price, Rusk, and Sawyer counties |
| Arthur Cirilli | Rep. | Resigned July 1972 after appointed Wisconsin circuit court judge. | 80th | 1971–1972 | Ashland, Bayfield, Douglas, Iron, Price, Rusk, and Sawyer counties |
| --Vacant-- | | | 80th | 1971–1972 | Ashland, Bayfield, Douglas, Iron, Price, Rusk, and Sawyer counties |
| Daniel O. Theno | Rep. | Won 1972 special election. | 81st | 1973–1974 | Ashland, Bayfield, Douglas, Iron, Sawyer, Washburn counties and Eastern Barron County; Northern Price County |
| Daniel O. Theno | Rep. | Won 1972 special election. | 82nd | 1975–1976 | Ashland, Bayfield, Douglas, Iron, Sawyer, Washburn counties and Eastern Barron County; Northern Price County |
| Daniel O. Theno | Rep. | Won 1972 special election. | 83rd | 1977–1978 | Ashland, Bayfield, Douglas, Iron, Sawyer, Washburn counties and Eastern Barron County; Northern Price County |
| Daniel O. Theno | Rep. | Won 1972 special election. | 84th | 1979–1980 | Ashland, Bayfield, Douglas, Iron, Sawyer, Washburn counties and Eastern Barron County; Northern Price County |
| Daniel O. Theno | Rep. | Won 1972 special election. | 85th | 1981–1982 | Ashland, Bayfield, Douglas, Iron, Sawyer, Washburn counties and Eastern Barron County; Northern Price County |
| Daniel O. Theno | Rep. | Won 1972 special election. | 86th | 1983–1984 | Ashland, Bayfield, Douglas, Iron, Sawyer, Washburn counties and Most of Barron County |
| Daniel O. Theno | Rep. | Won 1972 special election. | 87th | 1985–1986 | Ashland, Bayfield, Douglas, Iron, Sawyer, Washburn counties and Most of Barron County; Part of Rusk County |
| Robert Jauch | Dem. | Won 1986 election. Re-elected 1990, 1994, 1998, 2002, 2006, 2010. | 88th | 1987–1988 | Ashland, Bayfield, Douglas, Iron, Sawyer, Washburn counties and Most of Barron County; Part of Rusk County |
| Robert Jauch | Dem. | Won 1986 election. Re-elected 1990, 1994, 1998, 2002, 2006, 2010. | 89th | 1989–1990 | Ashland, Bayfield, Douglas, Iron, Sawyer, Washburn counties and Most of Barron County; Part of Rusk County |
| Robert Jauch | Dem. | Won 1986 election. Re-elected 1990, 1994, 1998, 2002, 2006, 2010. | 90th | 1991–1992 | Ashland, Bayfield, Douglas, Iron, Sawyer, Washburn counties and Most of Barron County; Part of Rusk County |
| Robert Jauch | Dem. | Won 1986 election. Re-elected 1990, 1994, 1998, 2002, 2006, 2010. | 91st | 1993–1994 | Ashland, Barron, Bayfield, Douglas, Iron, Sawyer, Washburn counties and Part of Polk County |
| Robert Jauch | Dem. | Won 1986 election. Re-elected 1990, 1994, 1998, 2002, 2006, 2010. | 92nd | 1995–1996 | Ashland, Barron, Bayfield, Douglas, Iron, Sawyer, Washburn counties and Part of Polk County |
| Robert Jauch | Dem. | Won 1986 election. Re-elected 1990, 1994, 1998, 2002, 2006, 2010. | 93rd | 1997–1998 | Ashland, Barron, Bayfield, Douglas, Iron, Sawyer, Washburn counties and Part of Polk County |
| Robert Jauch | Dem. | Won 1986 election. Re-elected 1990, 1994, 1998, 2002, 2006, 2010. | 94th | 1999–2000 | Ashland, Barron, Bayfield, Douglas, Iron, Sawyer, Washburn counties and Part of Polk County |
| Robert Jauch | Dem. | Won 1986 election. Re-elected 1990, 1994, 1998, 2002, 2006, 2010. | 95th | 2001–2002 | Ashland, Barron, Bayfield, Douglas, Iron, Sawyer, Washburn counties and Part of Polk County |
| Robert Jauch | Dem. | Won 1986 election. Re-elected 1990, 1994, 1998, 2002, 2006, 2010. | 96th | 2003–2004 | Ashland, Bayfield, Douglas, Iron, Washburn counties and Most of Barron County; Most of Sawyer County; Eastern Burnett County; Part of Polk County |
| Robert Jauch | Dem. | Won 1986 election. Re-elected 1990, 1994, 1998, 2002, 2006, 2010. | 97th | 2005–2006 | Ashland, Bayfield, Douglas, Iron, Washburn counties and Most of Barron County; Most of Sawyer County; Eastern Burnett County; Part of Polk County |
| Robert Jauch | Dem. | Won 1986 election. Re-elected 1990, 1994, 1998, 2002, 2006, 2010. | 98th | 2007–2008 | Ashland, Bayfield, Douglas, Iron, Washburn counties and Most of Barron County; Most of Sawyer County; Eastern Burnett County; Part of Polk County |
| Robert Jauch | Dem. | Won 1986 election. Re-elected 1990, 1994, 1998, 2002, 2006, 2010. | 99th | 2009–2010 | Ashland, Bayfield, Douglas, Iron, Washburn counties and Most of Barron County; Most of Sawyer County; Eastern Burnett County; Part of Polk County |
| Robert Jauch | Dem. | Won 1986 election. Re-elected 1990, 1994, 1998, 2002, 2006, 2010. | 100th | 2011–2012 | Ashland, Bayfield, Douglas, Iron, Washburn counties and Most of Barron County; Most of Sawyer County; Eastern Burnett County; Part of Polk County |
| Robert Jauch | Dem. | Won 1986 election. Re-elected 1990, 1994, 1998, 2002, 2006, 2010. | 101st | 2013–2014 | Ashland, Barron, Bayfield, Douglas, Iron, Price, Washburn counties and Part of Sawyer County; Eastern Burnett County; Part of Dunn County; Part of Polk County; Part of St. Croix County; Part of Vilas County |
| Janet Bewley | Dem. | Won 2014 election. Re-elected 2018. | 102nd | 2015–2016 | Ashland, Barron, Bayfield, Douglas, Iron, Price, Washburn counties and Part of Sawyer County; Eastern Burnett County; Part of Dunn County; Part of Polk County; Part of St. Croix County; Part of Vilas County |
| Janet Bewley | Dem. | Won 2014 election. Re-elected 2018. | 103rd | 2017–2018 | Ashland, Barron, Bayfield, Douglas, Iron, Price, Washburn counties and Part of Sawyer County; Eastern Burnett County; Part of Dunn County; Part of Polk County; Part of St. Croix County; Part of Vilas County |
| Janet Bewley | Dem. | Won 2014 election. Re-elected 2018. | 104th | 2019–2020 | Ashland, Barron, Bayfield, Douglas, Iron, Price, Washburn counties and Part of Sawyer County; Eastern Burnett County; Part of Dunn County; Part of Polk County; Part of St. Croix County; Part of Vilas County |
| Janet Bewley | Dem. | Won 2014 election. Re-elected 2018. | 105th | 2021–2022 | Ashland, Barron, Bayfield, Douglas, Iron, Price, Washburn counties and Part of Sawyer County; Eastern Burnett County; Part of Dunn County; Part of Polk County; Part of St. Croix County; Part of Vilas County |
| Romaine Quinn | Rep. | Elected 2022. | 106th | 2023–2024 | Ashland, Barron, Bayfield, Burnett, Douglas, Iron, Price, Washburn counties, part of Polk County, northern Sawyer County |
| Romaine Quinn | Rep. | Elected 2022. | 107th | 2025–2026 | |
