= Brighton, Marathon County, Wisconsin =

Brighton, Wisconsin
- Town
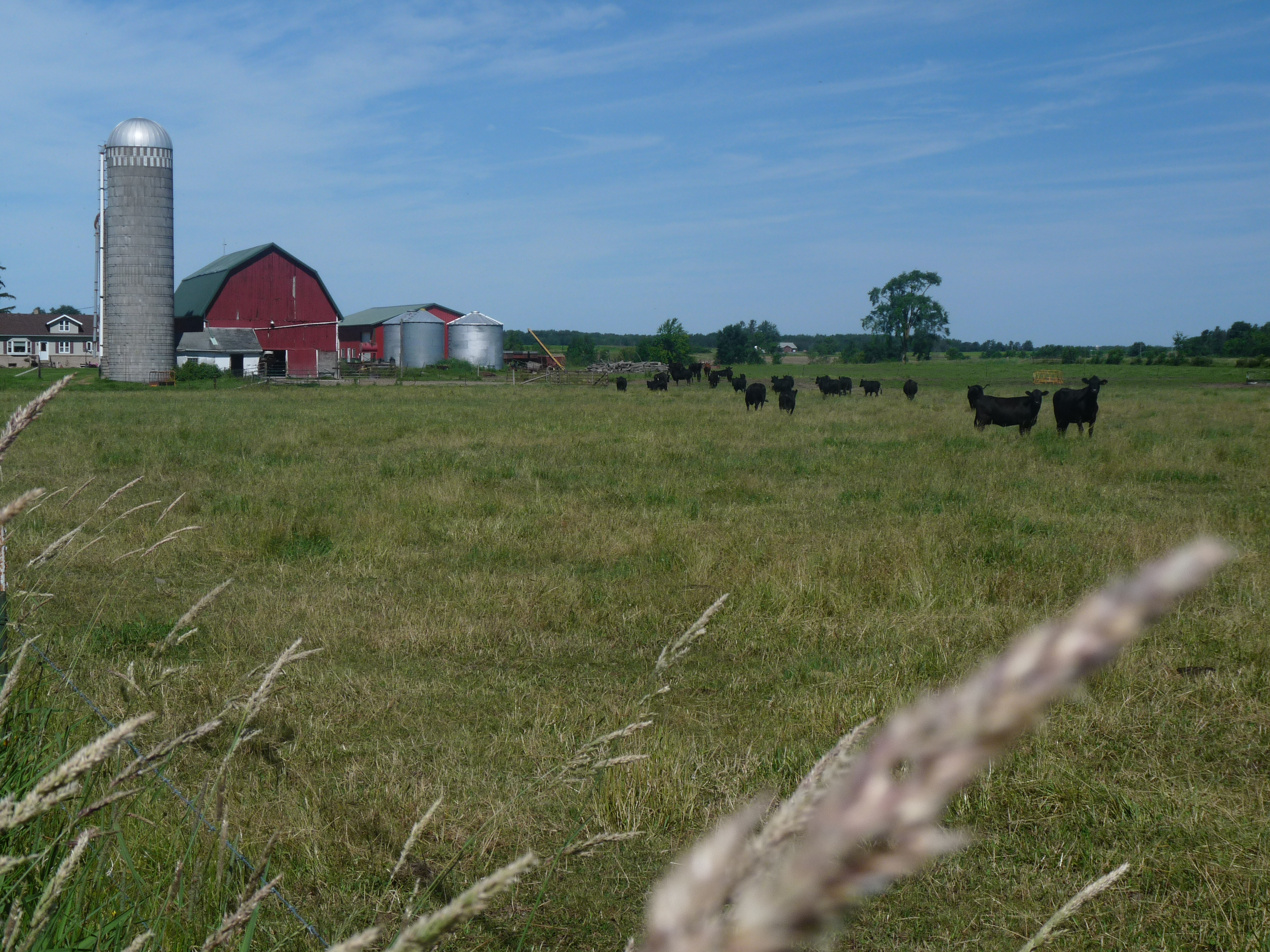
- Beef cattle and a dairy farm. Much of Brighton's terrain is flattish, like this.

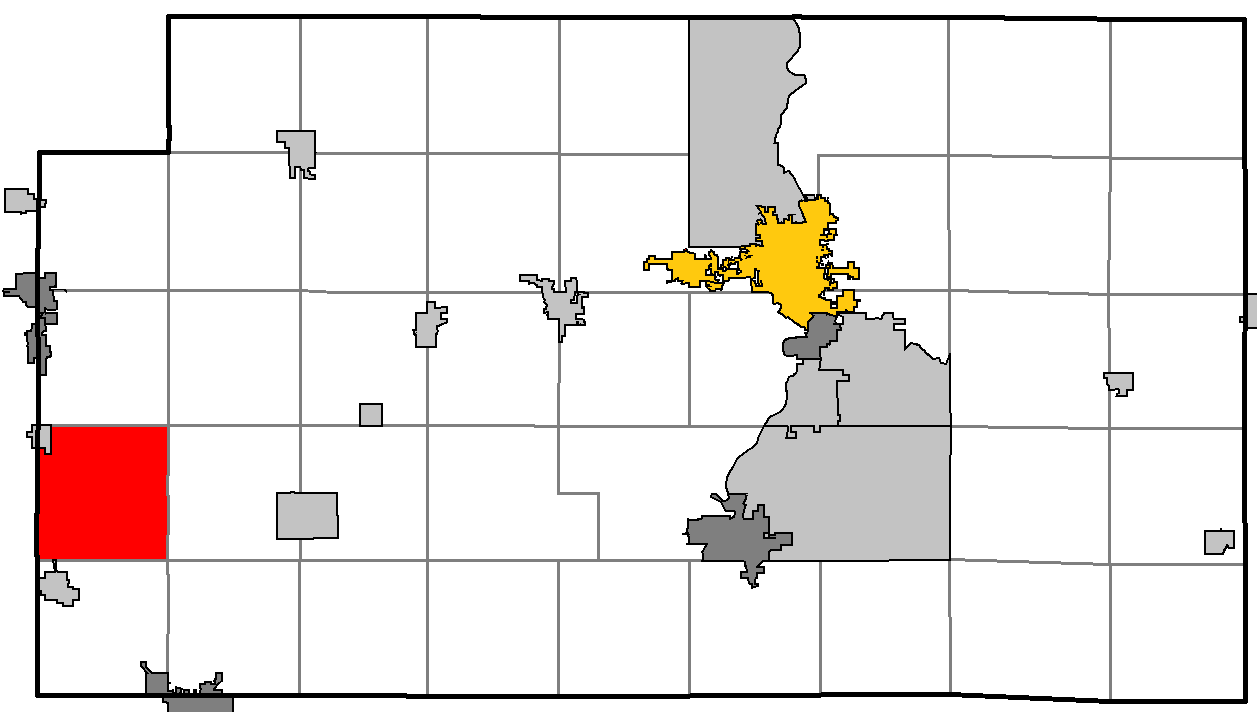
- Location of Brighton, Marathon County

- Location of Marathon County, Wisconsin
- Coordinates: 44°49′7″N 90°16′11″W
- Country: United States
- State: Wisconsin
- County: Marathon

Area
  - Total: 34.2 sq mi (88.7 km^{2})
  - Land: 34.2 sq mi (88.6 km^{2})
  - Water: 0.039 sq mi (0.1 km^{2})
- Elevation: 1,309 ft (399 m)

Population (2020)
  - Total: 620
  - Density: 18/sq mi (7.0/km^{2})
- Time zone: UTC-6 (Central (CST))
  - Summer (DST): UTC-5 (CDT)
- Area codes: 715 & 534
- FIPS code: 55-09650
- GNIS feature ID: 1582858
- PLSS township: T27N R2E

Brighton is a town in Marathon County, Wisconsin, United States. It is part of the Wausau Metropolitan Statistical Area. The population was 620 at the 2020 census.

== Geography ==
According to the United States Census Bureau, the town has a total area of 34.2 square miles (88.7 km^{2}), of which 34.2 square miles (88.6 km^{2}) is land and 0.04 square miles (0.1 km^{2}), or 0.06%, is water.

== History ==
The six mile square that would become Brighton was first surveyed in September 1851 by a crew working for the U.S. government. In December 1853 and January 1854 another crew marked its section corners, walking through the woods and wading the streams, measuring with chain and compass. When done, the deputy surveyor filed this general description:

This Township contains but few swamps. The land being generally good 2nd(?) Rate quality. The surface generally level. There are but few streams in this Township. The streams are all lined with Alder, and in many places would make good meadows(?). The Prevailing(?) Timber is Hemlock. The Pine is of Poor quality and scattering.

== Demographics ==
At the 2000 US census, there were 611 people, 197 households and 159 families residing in the town. The population density was 17.9 per square mile (6.9/km^{2}). There were 205 housing units at an average density of 6.0 per square mile (2.3/km^{2}). The racial makeup of the town was 96.89% White, 2.29% Asian, 0.16% from other races, and 0.65% from two or more races. Hispanic or Latino of any race were 0.82% of the population.

There were 197 households, of which 44.2% had children under the age of 18 living with them, 73.6% were married couples living together, 4.1% had a female householder with no husband present, and 18.8% were non-families. 13.7% of all households were made up of individuals, and 2.0% had someone living alone who was 65 years of age or older. The average household size was 3.10 and the average family size was 3.46.

32.7% of the population were under the age of 18, 9.0% from 18 to 24, 30.8% from 25 to 44, 19.3% from 45 to 64, and 8.2% who were 65 years of age or older. The median age was 32 years. For every 100 females, there were 105.7 males. For every 100 females age 18 and over, there were 122.2 males.

The median household income was $80,833 and 76.8% of Brighton's population is employed according to the 2022 American Community Survey. 10.7% are Local, state, and federal government workers in Marathon County, Wisconsin.

== Notable people ==
- William McNeight, Wisconsin farmer and legislator, was born in the town
