= Chester, New Hampshire =

Town in New Hampshire, United States

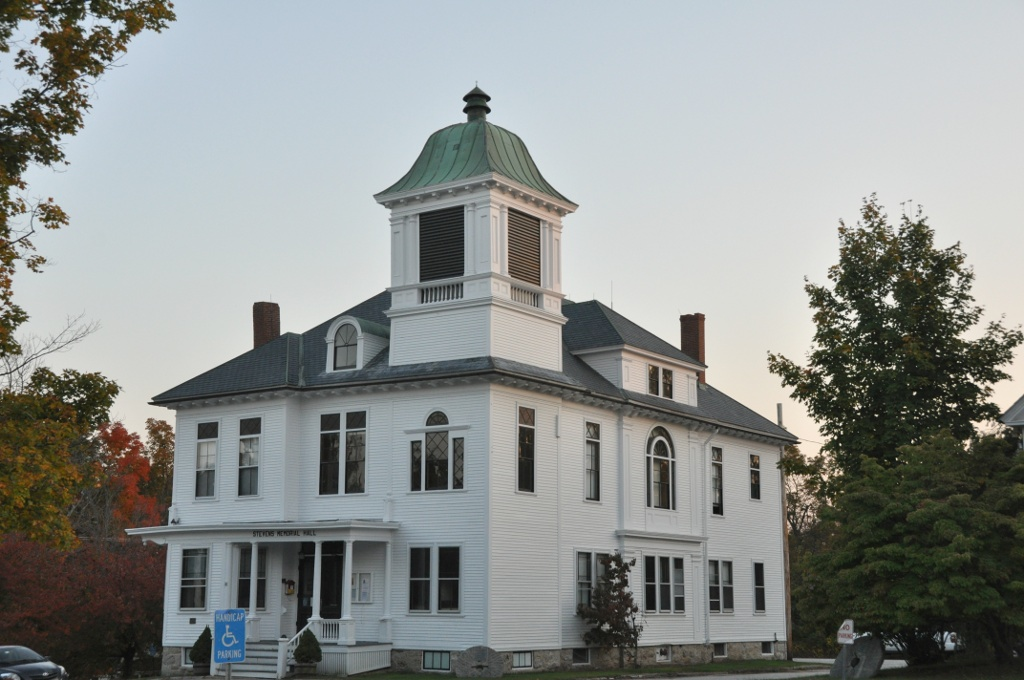
- Stevens Memorial Hall

- Seal

- Location in Rockingham County and the state of New Hampshire.
- Coordinates: 42°57′24″N 71°15′26″W
- Country: United States
- State: New Hampshire
- County: Rockingham
- Incorporated: 1722

Area
  - Total: 26.1 sq mi (67.7 km^{2})
  - Land: 26.0 sq mi (67.4 km^{2})
  - Water: 0.12 sq mi (0.3 km^{2}) 0.43%
- Elevation: 371 ft (113 m)

Population (2020)
  - Total: 5,232
  - Density: 201/sq mi (77.7/km^{2})
- Time zone: UTC-5 (Eastern)
  - Summer (DST): UTC-4 (Eastern)
- ZIP code: 03036
- Area code: 603
- FIPS code: 33-12100
- GNIS feature ID: 873564
- Website: www.chesternh.org

Chester is a town in Rockingham County, New Hampshire, United States. The population was 5,232 at the 2020 census, up from 4,768 at the 2010 census. It was home to the now defunct Chester College (formerly White Pines College).

== History ==
From Statistics and Gazetteer of New-Hampshire, 1875:

"Chester is considered one of the old towns of the state. In 1719, about eighty persons, chiefly from Portsmouth and Hampton, formed an association, for the purpose of securing a tract of land in the "Chesnut Country" (so called) and stationed three men upon this tract, to hold possession until they should procure a lawful title. After considerable difficulty they obtained a grant of land, ten miles [16 km] square. Immediately the settlement was commenced by several persons from Rye and Hampton, among whom were Samuel Ingalls, Jonathan Goodhue, Jacob Sargent, Ebenezer Dearborn, Robert Smith, E. Colby and S. Robie, who contributed largely to the permanent success of the enterprise. On the 8th of May, 1722 the township which had hitherto been called Cheshire, was incorporated under its present name, and comprising an area of over 120 square miles [310 km^{2}]."

Chester once included Candia, set off in 1763. It may have been the first of the settlement grants by Massachusetts selected for expansion of growing populations in the seacoast. The name may be derived from Chester, the county town of the county of Cheshire in England. Earl of Chester is a title held by the Prince of Wales.

In 1822, a portion of Hooksett was taken from Chester. In 1845, the portion of the town known as Long Meadows was incorporated under the name of Auburn.

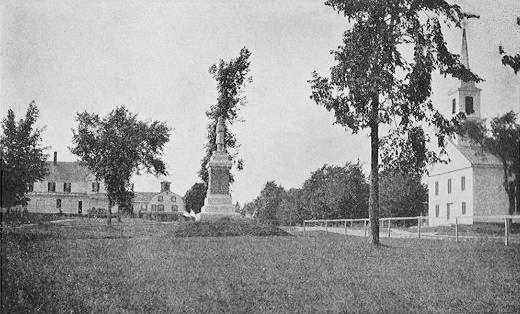
The Common c. 1910

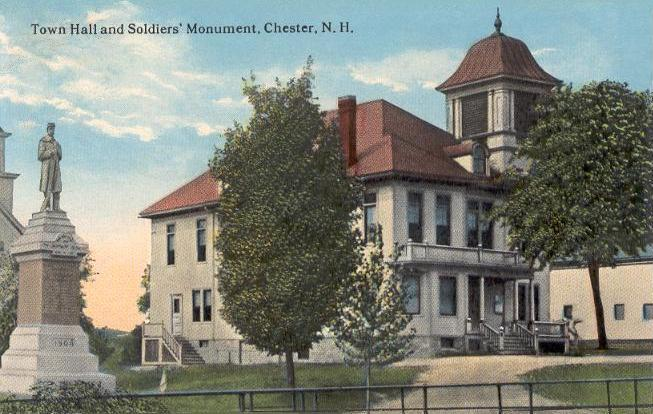
Town Hall in 1913

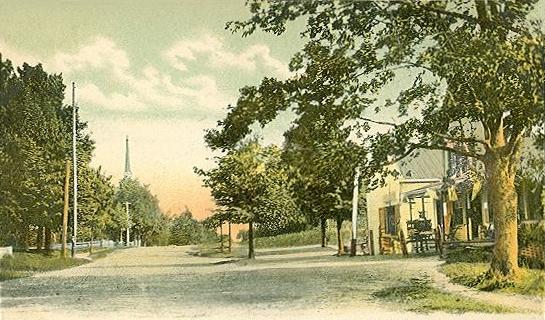
Blacksmith Shop in 1909

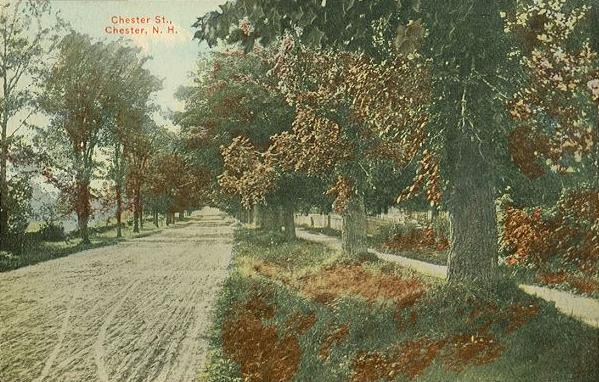
Chester Street c. 1910

== Geography ==
Chester is in southeastern New Hampshire, in the western part of Rockingham County. The highest point in town is found on an unnamed hill west of Bell Hill and northwest of Harantis Lake; it has two knobs of almost equal elevation of at least 635 feet (194 m), according to the most recent (2011–2012) USGS 7.5-minute topographical map.

According to the U.S. Census Bureau, the town has a total area of 26.1 square miles (67.7 km^{2}), of which 26.0 square miles (67.4 km^{2}) are land and 0.12 square miles (0.3 km^{2}), or 0.43%, are water. The Exeter River rises in Chester. The area of Chester drained by the Exeter and its tributary Towle Brook lies within the Piscataqua River (Coastal) watershed, while the western edge of town drains west toward Massabesic Lake and is in the Merrimack River watershed.

== Demographics ==
Historical population
Census	Pop.	Note	%±
1790	1,902		—
1800	2,046		7.6%
1810	2,030		−0.8%
1820	2,262		11.4%
1830	2,039		−9.9%
1840	1,304		−36.0%
1850	1,301		−0.2%
1860	1,275		−2.0%
1870	1,153		−9.6%
1880	1,136		−1.5%
1890	958		−15.7%
1900	861		−10.1%
1910	818		−5.0%
1920	652		−20.3%
1930	653		0.2%
1940	702		7.5%
1950	807		15.0%
1960	1,053		30.5%
1970	1,382		31.2%
1980	2,006		45.2%
1990	2,691		34.1%
2000	3,792		40.9%
2010	4,768		25.7%
2020	5,232		9.7%
U.S. Decennial Census

As of the census of 2000, there were 3,792 people, 1,214 households, and 1,011 families residing in the town. The population density was 146.4 inhabitants per square mile (56.5/km^{2}). There were 1,247 housing units at an average density of 48.1 per square mile (18.6/km^{2}). The racial makeup of the town was 97.97% White, 0.26% African American, 0.42% Native American, 0.32% Asian, 0.16% from other races, and 0.87% from two or more races. Hispanic or Latino of any race were 0.82% of the population.

There were 1,214 households, out of which 45.0% had children under the age of 18 living with them, 73.3% were married couples living together, 6.6% had a female householder with no husband present, and 16.7% were non-families. 11.8% of all households were made up of individuals, and 4.3% had someone living alone who was 65 years of age or older. The average household size was 3.09 and the average family size was 3.38.

In the town, the population was spread out, with 31.0% under the age of 18, 6.3% from 18 to 24, 32.1% from 25 to 44, 24.6% from 45 to 64, and 6.1% who were 65 years of age or older. The median age was 36 years. For every 100 females, there were 97.8 males. For every 100 females age 18 and over, there were 94.4 males.

The median income for a household in the town was $68,571, and the median income for a family was $75,092. Males had a median income of $44,056 versus $35,382 for females. The per capita income for the town was $23,842. About 3.4% of families and 5.0% of the population were below the poverty line, including 5.9% of those under age 18 and 5.2% of those age 65 or over.

== Education ==
Elementary and middle school students attend Chester Academy (public). High school students attend Pinkerton Academy in Derry, a privately operated school that contracts with the towns of Derry, Auburn, Chester, Candia, Hooksett, and Hampstead.

== Infrastructure ==
=== Transportation ===
Three New Hampshire state routes cross Chester.

- NH 102 follows Derry Road and Raymond Road through town, running from Derry in the southwest to Raymond in the northeast.
- NH 121 follows Chester Street and Haverhill Road through town, running from Auburn in the west to Hampstead (via small bits of Derry and Sandown) in the southeast.
- NH 121A begins in town just east of the center of town at an intersection with NH 121, and goes east along Sandown Road into Sandown.

== Notable people ==
- Charles H. Bell (1823–1893), 38th governor of New Hampshire and son of John Bell
- John Bell (1765–1836), 12th governor of New Hampshire
- Samuel Bell (1770–1850), 8th governor of New Hampshire and brother of John Bell
- Samuel Newell Bell (1829–1889), congressman and grandson of Samuel Bell
- Timothy Dexter (1747–1806), businessman, eccentric writer
- Daniel Chester French (1850–1931), sculptor
- George Cochrane Hazelton (1832–1922), congressman from Wisconsin
- Gerry Whiting Hazelton (1829–1920), congressman from Wisconsin
- Arthur Livermore (1766–1853), congressman
