= Moses M. Davis =

19th century American physician and politician

President pro tempore of the Wisconsin Senate
- In office January 11, 1860 – January 7, 1861
- Preceded by: Denison Worthington
- Succeeded by: Alden I. Bennett

Member of the Wisconsin Senate from the 25th district
- In office January 5, 1857 – January 7, 1861
- Preceded by: John Q. Adams
- Succeeded by: Gerry Whiting Hazelton

Member of the Wisconsin State Assembly from the Columbia 1st district
- In office January 7, 1856 – January 5, 1857
- Preceded by: William T. Whirry
- Succeeded by: George M. Bartholomew

Personal details
- Born: August 27, 1820 Sharon, Vermont, U.S.
- Died: May 1, 1888 Baraboo, Wisconsin, U.S.
- Resting place: Walnut Hill Cemetery, Baraboo
- Party: Republican; Free Soil (1848–1854); Liberty (before 1848)
- Spouse: Eunice Emerson Dana (m. 1846–1888)
- Children: Susan Dana (Follansbee)^{(b. 1848; died 1915)}; Henry Chandler Davis^{(b. 1849; died 1910)}; 3 others
- Education: Norwich University; Vermont Medical College
- Profession: Physician

Moses Mitchell Davis (August 27, 1820 – May 1, 1888) was an American medical doctor, Republican politician, and Wisconsin pioneer. He was a member of the Wisconsin Senate, representing Columbia County from 1857 through 1861, and served one term in the Wisconsin State Assembly, in 1856. He was also a regent of the University of Wisconsin, where he was instrumental in passage of a resolution in favor of co-education.

== Early life and education ==
Moses M. Davis was born in the town of Sharon, Vermont, in 1820. He was educated in the common schools and then attended Norwich University, beginning in 1837. While pursuing his education, he worked on farms in the summers and taught school in the winters. He began studying medicine and surgery under Dr. David Carlisle Joslyn at Waitsfield, Vermont, in 1843, and began attending medical lectures at Dartmouth College. He subsequently attended Vermont Medical College in Woodstock, Vermont, where he graduated in June 1846. He immediately began practicing medicine at Norwich, Vermont. While living in Vermont he also became a member of the Connecticut River Medical Society.

== Political career ==
While living in Vermont, Davis became involved in politics, particularly in the cause of abolition. He was initially active in the Vermont organization of the Liberty Party. After that party faded, Davis became one of the leading organizers of the Free Soil Party (or Free Democrats) in Vermont in the early 1850s. He was a delegate to the National Free Democratic convention in Pittsburgh, Pennsylvania, in 1852, and then served on the electoral slate for Free Soil presidential candidate John P. Hale.

In 1854, he moved west to Wisconsin, settling in the city of Portage, in Columbia County. He quickly became involved in Wisconsin politics with the Free Soil Party and its successor, the Republican Party, and was nominated for Wisconsin State Assembly in Columbia County's 1st Assembly district in 1855. He went on to win the general election and represented the northern half of Columbia County during the 1856 session.

During that term in the Assembly, a massive railroad bribery scheme touched nearly every member of the Legislature. Davis was one of the few who was not bribed and voted against the railroad land grant. In retaliation, the railroad began a campaign of harassment against him. They bought two of the three Republican newspapers in Columbia County to campaign against him in 1856. The grudge also affected Davis' personal property for several more years, as some of his land was to be used in the railroad route. The railroad occupied that part of his property in Portage and laid down railroad on the land without paying him. Davis won an injunction that the occupation could not commence until he was paid, but the company ignored the order. Davis eventually tore up part of the railroad track. The company sent a hundred men to rebuild the route, but the bulk of them were arrested by the sheriff. Finally, after an engine and several cars attempted to run through the area and ended up derailed, the company was forced to pay for the land in 1860.

Despite the railroad's efforts, Davis won election to the Wisconsin Senate in 1856 and was re-elected in 1858, representing all of Columbia County in the 1857, 1858, 1859, and 1860 legislative sessions. While serving in his first term in the Senate, Davis also became active as a newspaper editor with the Republican partisan paper the Portage City Record, in partnership with Andrew Jackson Turner.

During and after his time in the Senate, he served in a number of other appointed positions. He was appointed to the University of Wisconsin board of regents in 1858, by a vote of the Legislature, and was re-appointed in 1864. He declined reappointment to the board of regents after the university's restructuring in 1866. In the meantime, he was appointed commissioner for the Indian population near Green Bay in 1861, and was then appointed draft commissioner for Columbia County in 1862. In 1863 he moved to Appleton, Wisconsin, to serve as trustee of lands for improvements on the Fox River. In Appleton, he also became a trustee of Lawrence University, serving on that board until 1870.

After the conclusion of his work in Appleton, he moved to Chicago for some time, but left after the great fire in 1871. He returned to Wisconsin, this time settling in Baraboo, Wisconsin, in Sauk County, where he resumed his medical practice and remained for much of the rest of his life. He was a member of the Wisconsin State Medical Society, the American Medical Association, and the American Public Health Association.

== Personal life and family ==
Moses Mitchell Davis was a son of Moses Davis of Methuen, Massachusetts, and his wife Polly (née Chandler) Davis, of Pomfret, Connecticut. His parents ultimately also moved to Portage, Wisconsin.

In his political activity and writing, Davis was often found in partnership with his cousin Julius Converse "Shanghai" Chandler—a prolific and infamous Republican newspaper editor in central Wisconsin throughout the 1860s and 1870s.

Davis married Eunice Emerson Dana, of Warren, Vermont, on December 3, 1846. They had five children, though one died in infancy.

Moses M. Davis died at his home in Baraboo on May 1, 1888, from the effects of a stroke.

Wisconsin State Assembly
Preceded by William T. Whirry	Member of the Wisconsin State Assembly from the Columbia 1st district January 7, 1856 – January 5, 1857	Succeeded by George M. Bartholomew
Wisconsin Senate
Preceded by John Q. Adams	Member of the Wisconsin Senate from the 25th district January 5, 1857 – January 7, 1861	Succeeded by Gerry Whiting Hazelton
Preceded by Denison Worthington	President pro tempore of the Wisconsin Senate; January 11, 1860 – January 7, 1861	Succeeded by Alden I. Bennett
