= Arthur Cirilli =

20th century American politician and judge

The Honorable Arthur A. Cirilli

Chief Judge of the 10th District of Wisconsin Circuit Courts
- In office August 1, 1978 – July 31, 1984
- Preceded by: Position established
- Succeeded by: William O'Brien

Wisconsin Circuit Court Judge for the Douglas Circuit, Branch 1
- In office August 1, 1978 – July 31, 1985
- Preceded by: Transitioned from County Court
- Succeeded by: Michael T. Lucci

County Judge for Douglas County, Branch 1
- In office July 1972 – July 31, 1978
- Appointed by: Patrick Lucey
- Preceded by: Donald A. Rock
- Succeeded by: Transitioned to Circuit Court

Member of the Wisconsin Senate from the 25th district
- In office January 2, 1967 – July 1972
- Preceded by: Frank Christopherson, Jr.
- Succeeded by: Daniel Theno

Personal details
- Born: December 28, 1914 Eveleth, Minnesota
- Died: December 17, 1995 (aged 80) Superior, Wisconsin
- Resting place: Greenwood Cemetery; Superior, Wisconsin
- Party: Republican
- Spouse: Mary
- Children: James, Rodie, Mary
- Education: Gogebic Junior College; University of Wisconsin (LL.B.)
- Profession: lawyer, politician

Military service
- Allegiance: United States
- Branch/service: United States Army
- Years of service: 1942–1945
- Battles/wars: World War II: Pacific War

Arthur A. Cirilli (December 28, 1914 – December 17, 1995) was an American lawyer, politician, and judge in Wisconsin. He was a judge in Douglas County for thirteen years, and was the first Chief Judge of the 10th Judicial Administrative District after its formation in the judicial reorganization of 1978. Earlier in his career, he served six years in the Wisconsin State Senate as a Republican.

== Biography ==
Arthur Cirilli was born in Eveleth, Minnesota, and raised in Iron County, Wisconsin. He attended Hurley High School and Gogebic Junior College, in Ironwood, in the Upper Peninsula of Michigan. He graduated from the University of Wisconsin in 1942, earning a Bachelor of Laws degree.

He served in the United States Army during World War II, and served in the Pacific theater. After the war, he went to work as an attorney in Superior, Wisconsin.

He was elected to the Wisconsin State Senate in 1966 and re-elected in 1970. In 1972, he was appointed a County Judge for Douglas County by Governor Patrick Lucey. He was re-elected to that office in 1973, and, after the 1978 judicial reorganization, was transitioned to the Douglas County Circuit Court. He reached mandatory retirement on July 31, 1985, but continued to serve as a reserve judge and arbitrator.

Judge Cirilli was active with the American Legion, the Veterans of Foreign Wars, the Fraternal Order of Eagles, the Benevolent and Protective Order of Elks, and the University of Wisconsin Board of Visitors.

He died in 1995 and was survived by his wife, Mary, and three adult children.

Wisconsin Senate
Preceded by Frank Christopherson, Jr.	Member of the Wisconsin Senate from the 25th district 1967 – 1972	Succeeded by Daniel Theno
Legal offices
Preceded by Donald A. Rock	County Judge for Douglas County, Branch 1; 1972 – 1978	Succeeded by Court abolished
New seat	Wisconsin Circuit Court Judge for the Douglas Circuit, Branch 1; 1978 – 1985	Succeeded by Michael T. Lucci
