= Carl Lauri =

American politician (1924–1990)

Member of the Wisconsin Senate from the 25th district
- In office January 3, 1955 – January 7, 1963
- Preceded by: Clifford Krueger
- Succeeded by: Frank Christopherson, Jr.

Personal details
- Born: January 16, 1924 Superior, Wisconsin
- Died: December 28, 1990 (aged 66) Dane, Wisconsin
- Party: Democratic
- Education: Superior State College

Carl Lauri was a Democratic member of the Wisconsin Senate, representing the 25th district from 1955 to 1963.

According to the Wisconsin Blue Book (1962), he was born in Superior, Wisconsin, and graduated from Superior State College in 1954. He formerly worked as a railroad clerk, and was a veteran of World War II. He was a delegate to the 1960 Democratic National Convention. He was also the chairman of the 10th District Democratic Party, and a member of the State Democratic Administrative Committee. Elected to the Senate in 1954; re-elected in 1958.

Lauri died in 1990.,
