= Columbus (town), Wisconsin =

Columbus, Wisconsin
- Town
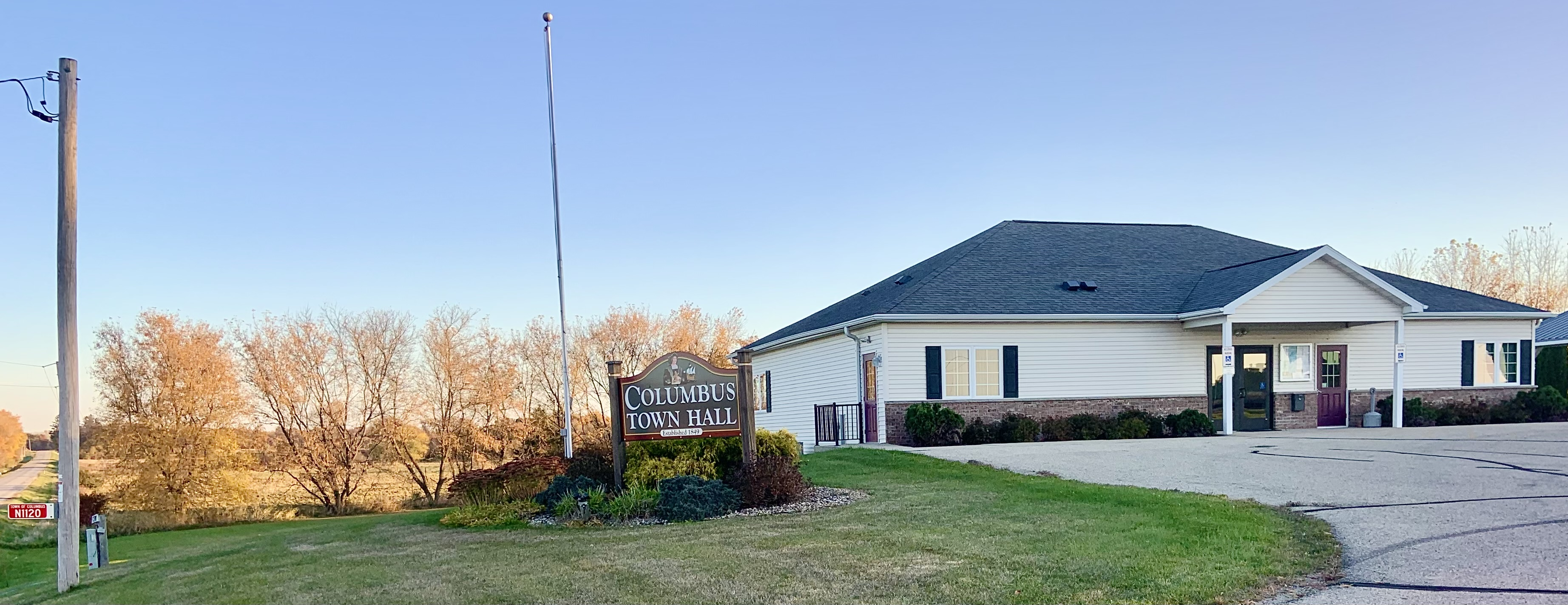
- Town hall

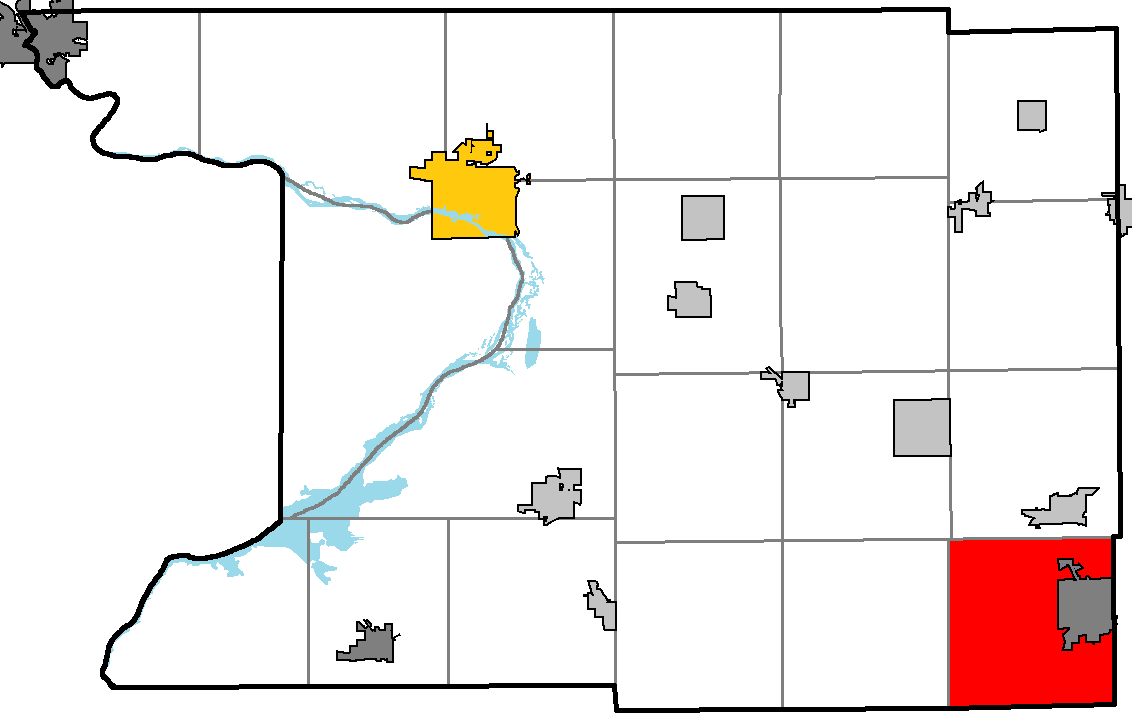
- Location of Columbus, within Columbia County, Wisconsin

- Location of Columbia County, Wisconsin
- Coordinates: 43°20′19″N 89°3′33″W
- Country: United States
- State: Wisconsin
- County: Columbia

Area
  - Total: 31.9 sq mi (82.6 km^{2})
  - Land: 31.9 sq mi (82.6 km^{2})
  - Water: 0 sq mi (0 km^{2})
- Elevation: 902 ft (275 m)

Population (2020)
  - Total: 626
  - Density: 19.6/sq mi (7.58/km^{2})
- Time zone: UTC-6 (Central (CST))
  - Summer (DST): UTC-5 (CDT)
- Area code: 920
- FIPS code: 55-16475
- GNIS feature ID: 1583006
- Website: https://www.townofcolumbuswi.com/

Columbus is a town in Columbia County, Wisconsin, United States. The population was 626 at the 2020 census. The city of Columbus lies mostly with the town boundaries.

== Geography ==
According to the United States Census Bureau, the town has a total area of 31.9 square miles (82.6 km^{2}), all land.

== Demographics ==
As of the census of 2000, there were 711 people, 236 households, and 193 families residing in the town. The population density was 22.3 people per square mile (8.6/km^{2}). There were 241 housing units at an average density of 7.6 per square mile (2.9/km^{2}). The racial makeup of the town was 98.45% White, 0.14% Black or African American, 0.14% Native American, 0.28% Asian, 0.14% from other races, and 0.84% from two or more races. 0.98% of the population were Hispanic or Latino of any race.

There were 236 households, out of which 36.4% had children under the age of 18 living with them, 69.1% were married couples living together, 8.5% had a female householder with no husband present, and 18.2% were non-families. 14.8% of all households were made up of individuals, and 5.9% had someone living alone who was 65 years of age or older. The average household size was 2.91 and the average family size was 3.21.

In the town, the population was spread out, with 26.9% under the age of 18, 7% from 18 to 24, 30.5% from 25 to 44, 22.4% from 45 to 64, and 13.2% who were 65 years of age or older. The median age was 37 years. For every 100 females, there were 111 males. For every 100 females age 18 and over, there were 103.1 males.

The median income for a household in the town was $55,682, and the median income for a family was $57,386. Males had a median income of $36,042 versus $24,531 for females. The per capita income for the town was $19,660. About 3% of families and 3.8% of the population were below the poverty line, including 3.4% of those under age 18 and none of those age 65 or over.

== Notable people ==
- John Q. Adams, Wisconsin State Senator
- Alfred Topliff, Wisconsin State Representative
