= Frank Christopherson Jr. =

American politician (1927–2020)

Member of the Wisconsin Senate from the 25th district
- In office January 7, 1963 – January 2, 1967
- Preceded by: Carl Lauri
- Succeeded by: Arthur Cirilli

Personal details
- Born: May 24, 1927 Superior, Wisconsin, U.S.
- Died: December 15, 2020 (aged 93) Duluth, Minnesota, U.S.
- Party: Democratic
- Education: Superior State College

Frank W. Christopherson Jr. (May 24, 1927 – December 15, 2020) was an American politician.

Christopherson was a Democratic member of the Wisconsin Senate, representing the 25th district from 1963 to 1967. He also served in the Wisconsin Assembly from 1959 to 1963.

According to the Wisconsin Blue Book (1966), he was born in Superior, Wisconsin, and attended Superior State College. He worked as a train engineer and fireman, as well as a newspaper publisher. He served in the Army Air Corps during World War II. He was a county board member from 1956 to 1962.

Christopherson died at Maywood of Benedictine Assisted Living in Duluth, Minnesota.
