= Gerry Whiting Hazelton =

American politician

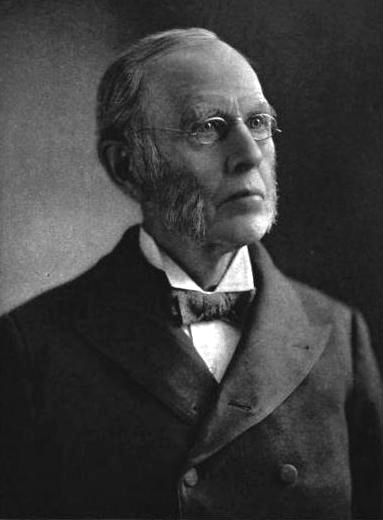

United States Attorney for the Eastern District of Wisconsin
- In office 1876–1885
- Appointed by: Ulysses S. Grant
- President: Ulysses S. Grant; Rutherford B. Hayes; James A. Garfield; Chester A. Arthur
- Preceded by: Levi Hubbell
- Succeeded by: W. A. Walker

Member of the U.S. House of Representatives from Wisconsin's 2nd district
- In office March 4, 1871 – March 3, 1875
- Preceded by: David Atwood
- Succeeded by: Lucien B. Caswell

President pro tempore of the Wisconsin Senate
- In office September 10, 1862 – January 14, 1863
- Preceded by: Frederick Thorpe
- Succeeded by: Wyman Spooner

Member of the Wisconsin Senate from the 25th district
- In office January 1, 1861 – January 1, 1863
- Preceded by: Moses M. Davis
- Succeeded by: Jonathan Bowman

District Attorney of Columbia County
- In office January 1, 1865 – January 1, 1867
- Preceded by: Israel Holmes
- Succeeded by: J. T. Clark

Personal details
- Born: February 24, 1829 Chester, New Hampshire, U.S.
- Died: September 29, 1920 (aged 91) Milwaukee, Wisconsin, U.S.
- Resting place: Forest Home Cemetery; Milwaukee, Wisconsin
- Party: Republican
- Spouse: Martha Squire Hazelton
- Children: Anna Hazelton (b. 1858; died 1951)
- Parents: William Hazelton (father); Mercy J. Cochrane (mother)
- Relatives: George Cochrane Hazelton (brother); Clark B. Cochrane (uncle)

Gerry Whiting Hazelton (February 24, 1829 – September 29, 1920) was an American lawyer and Republican politician from Columbia County, Wisconsin. He served two terms in the U.S. House of Representatives, representing Wisconsin's 2nd congressional district in the 42nd and 43rd congresses (1871–1875). He later served nine years as United States Attorney for the Eastern District of Wisconsin. Before serving in Congress, he served two years as a member of the Wisconsin Senate, and served two years as district attorney of Columbia County.

His younger brother, George Cochrane Hazelton, also served in the U.S. House of Representatives.

== Early life ==
Born in Chester, Rockingham County, New Hampshire, he attended the common schools and Pinkerton Academy in Derry, New Hampshire, and he received instruction from a private tutor. He studied law and was admitted to the bar in Amsterdam, New York, in 1852.

== Career ==
Hazelton moved to Columbus, Wisconsin, in 1860, where he served in the Wisconsin State Senate in 1861 and 1862, and was chosen as president pro tempore in the special session of 1862. He was a delegate to the 1860 Republican National Convention and became district attorney for Columbia County, Wisconsin in 1865. He was then appointed collector of internal revenue for the second district of Wisconsin in 1866 and removed by President Johnson the same year.

Elected to the House of Representatives in the Forty-second and Forty-third United States Congresses Hazelton was United States Representative for Wisconsin's 2nd congressional district (March 4, 1871 – March 3, 1875). After he served his terms, he moved to Milwaukee and became the United States attorney for the western district of Wisconsin. He later was appointed special master in chancery in 1912 and was the United States court commissioner and commissioner for Milwaukee County for many years.

== Death ==
Hazelton died in Milwaukee on September 29, 1920 (age 91 years, 218 days). He is interred at Forest Home Cemetery, Milwaukee, Wisconsin.

== Family ==
The son of William and Mercy Jane Hazelton, he married Martha L. Squire in 1854 and they had a daughter, Anna. His brother, George Cochrane Hazelton, was also a representative from Wisconsin. His uncle (his mother's brother), Clark B. Cochrane, was a congressman from New York.

== See also ==
- List of United States attorneys for Wisconsin

Wisconsin Senate
Preceded by Moses M. Davis	Member of the Wisconsin Senate from the 25th district 1861 – 1863	Succeeded by Jonathan Bowman
Preceded by Frederick Thorpe	President pro tempore of the Wisconsin Senate; 1862 – 1863	Succeeded by Wyman Spooner
U.S. House of Representatives
Preceded by David Atwood	Member of the U.S. House of Representatives from Wisconsin's 2nd congressional district March 4, 1871 – March 3, 1875	Succeeded by Lucien B. Caswell
Legal offices
Preceded by Israel Holmes	District Attorney of Columbia County, Wisconsin; 1865 – 1867	Succeeded by J. T. Clark
Preceded by Levi Hubbell	United States Attorney for the Eastern District of Wisconsin; 1876 – 1885	Succeeded by W. A. Walker
