= Alfred Topliff =

American politician

Alfred Topliff (November 11, 1799 – November 3, 1879) was an American teacher, surveyor, and politician.

Born in Westfield, Massachusetts, Topliff taught in schools in Massachusetts. In 1844, Topliff moved to the town of Columbus, Columbia County, Wisconsin Territory. He served as surveyor for Columbus County, Wisconsin until 1870. In 1854 and 1855, Topliff served in the Wisconsin State Assembly. In 1855, he moved to the village of Columbus, Wisconsin. He died in Columbus, Wisconsin.
