= George Cochrane Hazelton =

American politician (1832–1922)

George Hazelton
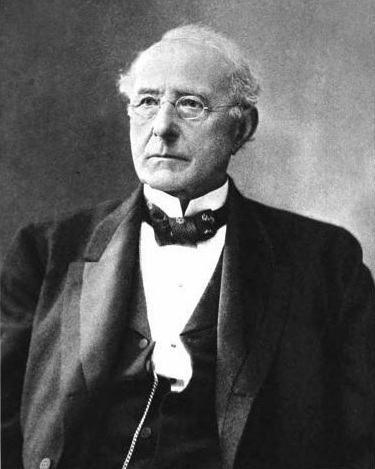

Attorney for the District of Columbia
- In office 1889–1893
- President: John Douglass
- Preceded by: Alfred Riddle
- Succeeded by: Sidney Thomas

Member of the U.S. House of Representatives from Wisconsin's 3rd district
- In office March 4, 1877 – March 3, 1883
- Preceded by: Henry S. Magoon
- Succeeded by: Burr W. Jones

Member of the Wisconsin Senate from the 16th district
- In office January 6, 1868 – January 1, 1872
- Preceded by: John H. Rountree
- Succeeded by: John Holloway

Personal details
- Born: George Cochrane Hazelton; January 3, 1832 Chester, New Hampshire, U.S.
- Died: September 4, 1922 (aged 90) Chester, New Hampshire, U.S.
- Resting place: Vale Cemetery, Schenectady, New York
- Party: Republican
- Spouse: Ellen Van Antwerp (died 1884)
- Children: 2, including George
- Relatives: Gerry Whiting Hazelton (brother); Clark B. Cochrane (nephew)
- Education: Union College (BA)

George Cochrane Hazelton (January 3, 1832 – September 4, 1922) was an American lawyer and Republican politician. He served three terms in the U.S. House of Representatives, representing Wisconsin's 3rd congressional district from 1877 to 1883. He was later the first appointed attorney general of the District of Columbia.

== Early life and education ==
Born in Chester, New Hampshire, Hazelton attended the district schools and prepared for college at Pinkerton Academy in New Hampshire and Dummer Academy in Massachusetts. Hazelton graduated from Union College in Schenectady, New York, in 1858. He studied law and was admitted to the bar in Malone, New York.

== Career ==
Hazelton then settled at Boscobel, Wisconsin, where he became prosecuting attorney of Grant County, Wisconsin, from 1864 to 1868. He was elected to the Wisconsin State Senate in 1867 and was reelected in 1869 and served as president pro tempore.

=== Congress ===
Elected as a Republican to the United States House of Representatives in the Forty-fifth, Forty-sixth, and Forty-seventh congresses, representing Wisconsin's 3rd congressional district.

He was unsuccessful candidate for renomination in 1882 and settled in Washington, D.C., where he practiced law and served as the attorney general for the District of Columbia during the Harrison administration.

Hazelton was among a large group of congressmen who advocated doctrines of racial superiority. He argued against the immigration of "unworthy" races, and said of the Chinese "I know that if the segment of her population now upon the Pacific shores is the standard and measure of her home civilization, it is of the lowest order.”

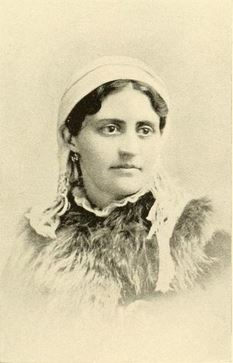
Ellen Van Antwerp

== Personal life ==
Hazelton was son of William and Mercy Jane Hazelton. His older brother, Gerry Whiting Hazelton, was also a member of Congress, and a prominent lawyer in Wisconsin. His nephew, Clark Betton Cochrane, was a member of Congress from New York.

He married Ellen Van Antwerp and they had two sons, George Jr. and John Hampden.

=== Death ===
Hazelton died in Chester, New Hampshire, on September 4, 1922, at the age of 90. He is interred at Vale Cemetery, Schenectady, New York.

U.S. House of Representatives
Preceded by Henry S. Magoon	Member of the U.S. House of Representatives from Wisconsin's 3rd congressional district 1877–1883	Succeeded by Burr W. Jones
Legal offices
Preceded by Alfred Riddle	Attorney for the District of Columbia; 1889–1893	Succeeded by Sidney Thomas
