= William McNeight =

American politician and farmer (1881–1954)

William H. McNeight (March 6, 1881 – May 3, 1954) was an American politician and farmer.

Born in the town of Brighton, Wisconsin, McNeight went to the public schools and was a farmer. He served as chairman of the town of Brighton and on the Marathon County, Wisconsin Board of Supervisors. He served in the Wisconsin State Senate in 1943-1947 as a Republican. He lost the Republican nomination in the 1946 Republican primary election to Clifford "Tiny" Krueger, whom he had defeated in the 1942 election for that seat when Krueger was the Progressive nominee.
