= Görlitz (disambiguation) =

Görlitz is a town divided by the German–Polish border at the end of World War II. Its two parts are:

- Görlitz, in Germany
  - Görlitz (district), of which Görlitz is the capital
  - Görlitz (electoral district), represented in the Bundestag
  - Görlitz station, located here
- Zgorzelec, in Poland (east of the Lusatian Neisse river)

Görlitz or Goerlitz may also refer to:

== People ==
Listed alphabetically by given name

- Andreas Görlitz (born 1982), German footballer
- Christian Görlitz (1944–2022), German film director
- David Goerlitz (born 1950), American model and advocate, best known as "Winston Man"
- Elizabeth of Görlitz (1390–1451), Duchess of Luxemburg
- Emil Görlitz (1903–1990), Polish footballer
- John of Görlitz (1370–1396), Duke of Görlitz
- Michael Görlitz (born 1987), German footballer
- Richard Goerlitz (born 1970), Australian ice speed skater

== Sports teams ==
- Gelb-Weiss Görlitz, a German football (soccer) club, 1909–present
- STC Görlitz, a German football (soccer) club, 1906–1945

== Other uses ==
- Gorlitz, Saskatchewan, a hamlet in Canada

== See also ==
- Gorlice, a town in south-eastern Poland
