= Alan Landers =

American actor

- Born: Alan Stewart Levine; November 30, 1940; Brooklyn, New York City
- Died: February 27, 2009 (aged 68); Lauderhill, Florida
- Known for: Appearing in advertising as "Winston Man"

Alan Landers (born Alan Stewart Levine) (November 30, 1940 – February 27, 2009) was an American male model and actor, best known as the "Winston Man", who appeared in advertising for Winston cigarettes.

== Biography ==
Born in Brooklyn, New York on November 30, 1940, he started to smoke "before [his] bar mitzvah". He enlisted in the United States Army at 17, where smoking breaks of five minutes each hour helped in the development of a two-and-a-half-pack-per-day smoking habit.

=== Modeling ===
After leaving military service, Landers took acting classes in New York and worked as a model, appearing in numerous fashion magazines, including being featured in a Playgirl centerfold. He also appeared in Cosmopolitan, GQ and Vogue. In addition to an appearance in the 1977 film Annie Hall playing the part of a pompous producer, he also had roles in several television programs such as America's Most Wanted.

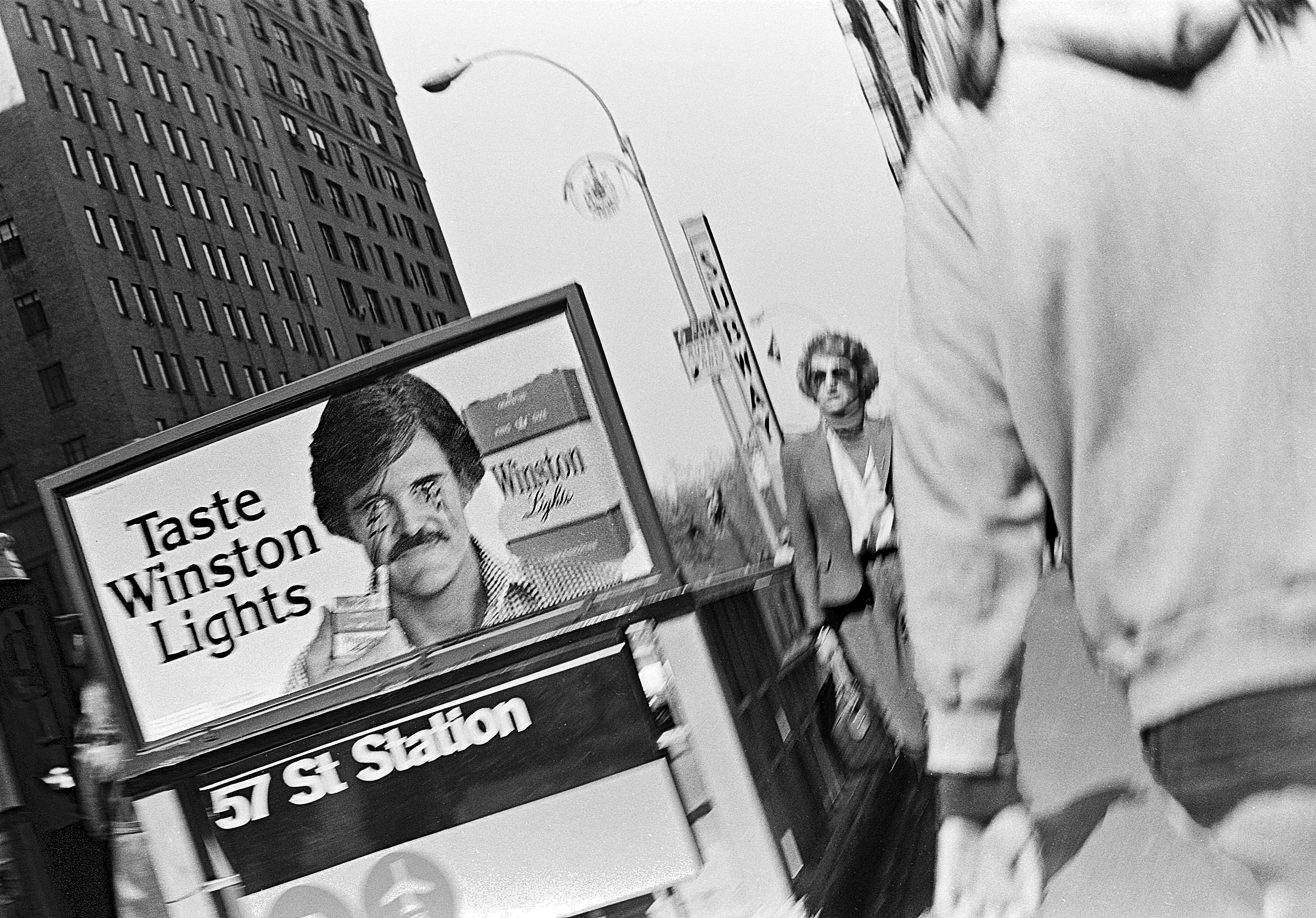
Winston Man advert (defaced) in Manhattan in 1979

Appearing in advertisements for Winston cigarettes in the mid-1960s, Landers recounted how he would smoke through cartons of cigarettes, ensuring that the ash on the end of the cigarette was never more than one-quarter inch, puffing to make a spiral of smoke just right for the photograph in ads that appeared with the slogan "Winston tastes good like a cigarette should". Reynolds paid him $3,000 to $5,000 a day for the week-long photo shoot, making it one of his most rewarding modeling jobs.

=== Anti-smoking advocacy ===
In 1987, he was diagnosed with lung cancer and later emphysema and cancer of the larynx, and had coronary artery bypass surgery, all of which he attributed to a lifetime of heavy smoking. Part of his right lung was removed in 1988, which led him to stop smoking for a few years. He resumed the habit in 1992, stopping a year later when he lost part of his right lung due to cancer.

He became an anti-smoking advocate, calling himself "Winston Man", attributing his health problems to his smoking. Landers traveled to lobby for tobacco reform before the United States Congress and the World Health Organization.

He filed a lawsuit in 1995 against the R. J. Reynolds Tobacco Company, makers of Winston, claiming that the company's cigarettes had exposed him to health risks without adequate warning. An R. J. Reynolds spokesman stated at the time the suit was filed that Landers was free to read the warnings that appeared on cigarette packages in the period when he was modeling. The case was scheduled for trial in April 2009, six weeks after his death, and his attorney was considering how to proceed with the matter.

In a magazine interview in early 2000, he stated that "Looking back on my career, I am ashamed that I helped promote such a lethal and addictive product to the children and adults of this country."

When asked how he could have ignored the health risks of smoking, particularly after the addition of the Surgeon General's official 1964 report linking cancer to smoking, he insisted in a 2000 interview with Jane Brody of The New York Times that "at no time was I ever told that cigarettes could be dangerous to my health". His attorney noted that whatever Landers knew about the risks of smoking, "He knew a lot less than R. J. Reynolds did."

In an interview with the South Florida Sun-Sentinel, Landers stated that "When I got the diagnosis, I thought about killing myself, but that didn't last. The tobacco companies have been waiting for me to die for years and I haven't. I'm not going to give them the satisfaction of beating me."

He died from cancer of the larynx on February 27, 2009, at his home in Lauderhill, Florida, after surviving his previous bouts with lung cancer as well as heart disease.

== See also ==
- David Goerlitz, another male model who appeared as "Winston Man"
