= A Billion Lives =

- Social film poster
- Directed by: Aaron Biebert
- Produced by: Jimi Jake Shaw; Jennifer Biebert; Aaron Biebert; Shem Biebert; Jesse Hieb
- Narrated by: Aaron Biebert
- Cinematography: Jimi Jake Shaw
- Edited by: Aaron Biebert; Jimi Jake Shaw; Jennifer Biebert
- Music by: Steven Pitzl with Timothy Wolf, Antics, The Other Shapes & The Royal.
- Production company: Attention Era Media
- Distributed by: Attention Era Media
- Release date: May 11, 2016 (Doc Edge Festival)
- Running time: 95 minutes

A Billion Lives is a 2016 documentary film directed and narrated by Aaron Biebert. The film stars "Winston Man" David Goerlitz, former president of the World Medical Association Delon Human, and former executive director at the World Health Organization Derek Yach.

The United Nations’ World Health Organization projects that a billion people will die prematurely from smoking this century. In the next 20 years, there will be nearly 1.6 billion smokers around the world. A Billion Lives takes a critical look at the history of smoking and the corruption that has led to the current situation where safer, healthier alternatives are banned or heavily restricted in most countries, while the cigarette trade is continually protected. The film examines major conflicts of interest and corruption between governments, big pharmaceutical companies, and public health officials. It also takes a look at the history of e-cigarettes, as well as the role vapor technology and Swedish Snus has played in the current health crisis.

== Synopsis ==
As the film begins, viewers are confronted by a claim that "this century a billion people are projected to die from smoking." The film continues to show the depth of harm tobacco can cause to human health, including increased risk of lung cancer, asthma, and chronic obstructive pulmonary disease. A Billion Lives continues by outlining the history of the tobacco industry, focusing primarily on tobacco corporations' attempts to hide the deleterious effects of tobacco and tobacco products. Many shots are accompanied and framed with interviews of the former Winston Man, David Goerlitz; Goerlitz, formerly the main model in a campaign by Winston Cigarettes to glamorize smoking, publicly denounced the tobacco industry in the late 1980s.

The second segment of the film shifts focus from the tobacco industry to the e-cigarette and vaping industry. Showcasing interviews and talks by Dr. Derek Yach, a former World Health Organization tobacco control chief; Clive Bates, a prominent anti-smoking activist; and many other experts, Biebert narrates the possibility that e-cigarettes may be able to save a majority of the billion lives that could be lost to tobacco.

The final section of the film centers on the attempts the tobacco industry has made to stop e-cigarettes from encroaching on the money-making abilities of the large multinational corporations involved. Set as an exploration of the reasons many people are critical toward vaping, the third act of the film shows how money is integral to the tobacco industry's survival. Tackling issues such as the involvement of pharmaceutical corporations and even governments in dealings with tobacco companies, the documentary reaches out to find out why there is such a negative bias toward vaping. Culminating in an extensive breakdown of how much money lies in the hands of tobacco industries, A Billion Lives covers a wide range of topics related to smoking.

== Development ==
The development of this documentary was led by Biebert; a filmmaker and director based in Milwaukee, Wisconsin. A director and executive producer at Attention Era Media, Biebert previously consulted and helped produce music videos, event films, sport highlight films, and social media storytelling films. A Billion Lives is his first feature film. Biebert first became interested in the vaping and tobacco industry when scouting ideas for his first feature film. After researching medical facts about tobacco and vapor and finding that one billion people were projected to die from tobacco this century, Biebert became passionate about documenting the subject. In an interview with Vape Craft Incorporated, he stated: "I became angry ... since those initial feelings, the topic has become very personal to me".

== Release dates ==
A Billion Lives was showcased at its world premiere, held at the prestigious Doc Edge Film Festival in Wellington, New Zealand, on May 10, 2016, where it was a finalist for Best International Feature.

=== North America ===
A Billion Lives had its North American premiere August 6 at the historic Pabst Theater in Milwaukee, Wisconsin where the movie was shown to a full movie theatre of about 1,400 people. Among the guests where Senator Ron Johnson, The Winston Man - Kurt Loeblich og Radiovert no:Herman Cain and Caty Tidwell from US magazine Vapun. After that they had the movie shown in Oklahoma City, Oklahoma on August 11, 2016.

The movie was also awarded a Silver REMI award at WorldFest Houston All 2016 WorldFest prize winners (PDF) 2016

The movie had its Hollywood premiere at Laemmle Music Hall in Beverly Hills October 28, 2016, as well as its New York City premiere the same day, in Cinepolis, Chelsea. Its Canadian premiere was at the HotDocs Theatre in Toronto.

Kathy Ireland CEO of Kathy ireland Worldwide was the chairman of the Charlotte, NC premiere on December 8, 2016. She commented "'A Billion Lives' is an incredible reminder of the lethal dangers of smoking. Aaron Biebert takes his audience on a journey that will not be forgotten."

The movie premiered on the online streaming platform Fearless on November 1, 2019.

=== Europe ===
The documentary premiered in Europe to a completely filled theater on June 16 at the Palace of Culture in Warsaw, Poland. It was a strong opening to the Global Forum on Nicotine where they got a Dorn Award.

The movie was screened in Paris, France September 11. at Le Grand Rex.
The movie was also screened in Paris, France September 25. at "et la Geode Paris"/Vape Expo.

The movie had its UK theatrical premiere October 26 at Odeon theatres. November 12 the movie is screened at hu:Uránia Nemzeti Filmszínház in Budapest, Hungary.

November 14: Screening at Cinemateket Oslo in Norway. For tickets, follow link:

=== Australia/Oceania ===
The Melbourne Documentary Film Festival showed the film on July 10, 2016, where Biebert won Best Director and they got the "Supreme Jury Prize".

New Zealand: The movie became available on Demand.Film from October 26.

Australia: The movie became available on Demand.Film from October 26.

=== Africa ===
Official selection at the 5th annual Jozi Film Festival in Johannesburg, South Africa. Screenings September 16 and 18. They won the prize for "Best International Documentary"

== Prizes and awards ==
- Best International Documentary
- Best Director, Melbourne Documentary Film Festival 2016
- Supreme Jury Prize, Melbourne Documentary Film Festival 2016
- silver REMI at WorldFest Houston 2016
- nominee for "Best International Feature" - Finalist, DocEdge filmfestival 2016
- Dorn Award - GFN16 in Warszaw
