= Jacob Nunnemacher =

- Born: 1819
- Died: 1870s
- Occupation: Businessman

Jacob "Jake" Nunnemacher (1819–ca. 1876), was a prominent businessman from Milwaukee, Wisconsin. He is known for the Nunnemacher Grand Opera House and also for the Nunnemacher Distillery which operated from 1842 to 1862.

== Background ==
Nunnemacher was born in a German-speaking area of Switzerland. He emigrated to New Orleans in 1841, and then moved to Milwaukee in 1843 because of its large German–speaking population.

== Meat market and distillery ==
Nunnemacher first sold meat at a stall in the public market, and then went on to buy a large two–story building. He had his meat market below and lived above with his family. He bought an additional property in the Town of Lake in 1854, which later became a part of Milwaukee. He had a cattle farm and distillery there. His home included a saloon.

== Nunnemacher Grand Opera House ==
Nunnemacher and his son Hermann built the Nunnemacher Grand Opera House in 1871. It spanned an entire block and was three stories high. It was later sold to Frederick Pabst who renamed the theater Das Neue Deutsche Stadt-Theater, or Stadt Theater. The theater suffered a large fire, was rebuilt and is now known as Pabst Theater, which is still in operation today.

== Criminal involvement ==
Nunnemacher eventually sold his distillery, which went on to become the Kinnickinnic Distillery.

However, in 1875 Nunnemacher was caught in the Whiskey Ring, and he was convicted and sent to prison for six months. The courts felt that he had conspired with the new owner of the distillery with manufacturing and removing illicit spirits, and that Jacob and his son, Hermann, were still operating as employees there and paying off tax revenue agents to avoid paying a $2 per barrel tax on whiskey.

Nunnemacher spent two months in jail. His influential Republican friends petitioned President Ulysses S. Grant for a pardon, which was granted.

== Death ==
Nunnemacher died the same year he was released from prison.

== Family ==
The Nunnemachers became one of Milwaukee's most prominent families, heavily involved in the business community, especially banking, manufacturing, and grain/shipping. Jacob's son Robert Nunnemacher founded Galland Henning Nopak, Inc., then a manufacturer of pneumatic malting equipment for the beer brewing industry. Now in its 132nd year of operation, the company remains family-owned with fourth-generation member Heath A. Nunnemacher serving as chairman of the board.
