= Pabst Theater =

Venue in Milwaukee, Wisconsin, US

Coordinates: 43.0411°N 87.91068°W

- Grande Olde Lady
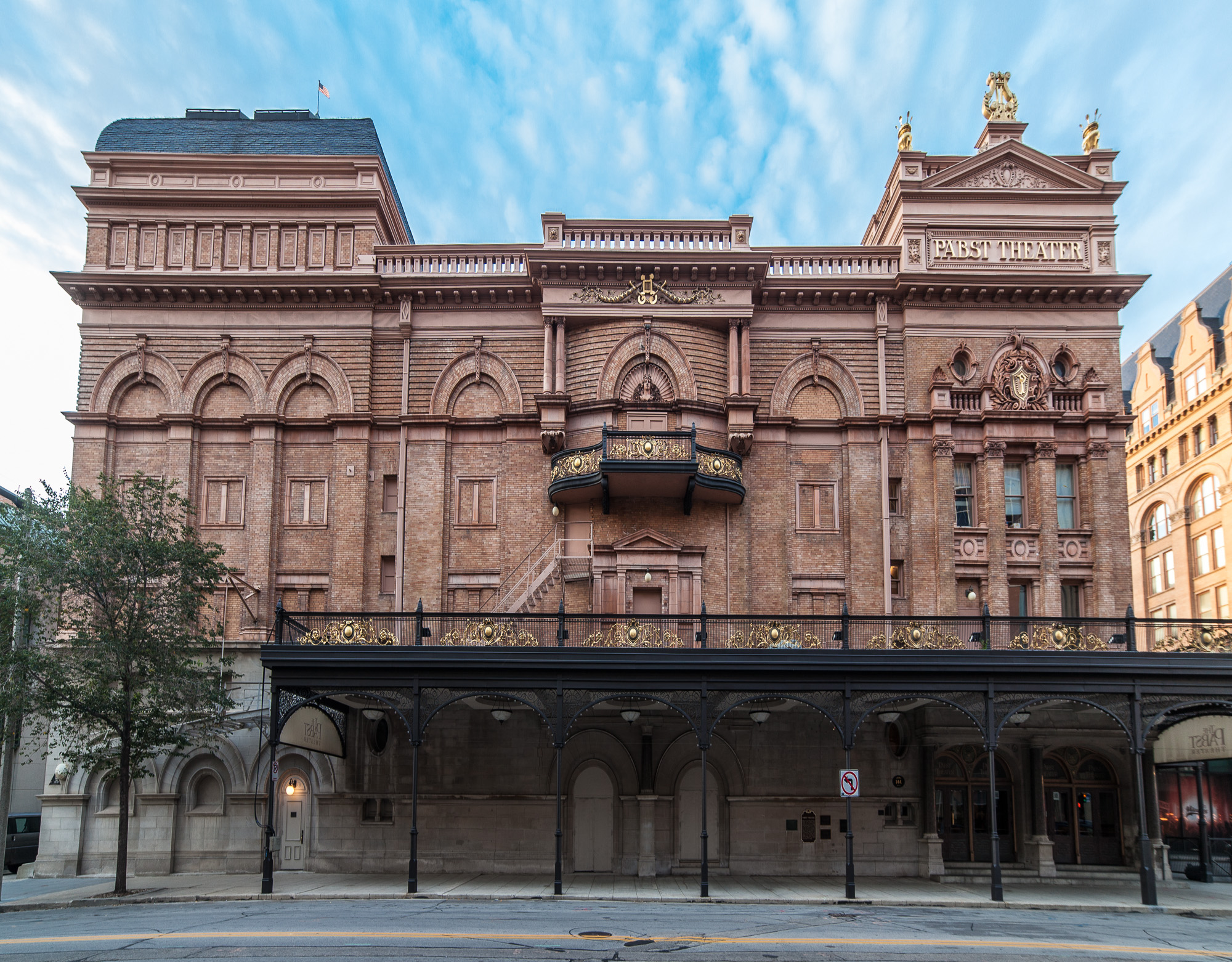
- The theater's south façade as seen in 2012
- Interactive map of Pabst Theater
- Full name: Captain Frederick Pabst Theater
- Address: 144 E Wells St; Milwaukee, WI 53202-3519
- Location: East Town
- Owner: Pabst Theater Group
- Operator: PTG Live Events
- Capacity: 1,339
- Public transit: MCTS

Construction
- Groundbreaking: December 1894
- Opened: November 9, 1895
- Renovated: 1928, 1976, 1989, 1998, 2002
- Cost: $300,000 ($11.2 million in 2025 dollars)
- Architect: Otto Strack

Website
- Venue Website
- Pabst Theater
- U.S. National Register of Historic Places
- U.S. National Historic Landmark
- Architectural style: German Renaissance Revival, Late Victorian
- NRHP reference No.: 72000063

Significant dates
- Added to NRHP: April 11, 1972
- Designated NHL: December 4, 1991

The Pabst Theater is an indoor performance and concert venue and landmark of Milwaukee, Wisconsin, United States. Colloquially known as "the Pabst", the theater hosts about 100 events per year. Built in 1895, it is the fourth-oldest continuously operating theater in the United States, and has presented such notables as pianist Sergei Rachmaninoff, actor Laurence Olivier, and ballerina Anna Pavlova, as well as various current big-name musical acts.

The Pabst is known for its opulence as well as its role in German-American culture in Milwaukee. It is officially designated a City of Milwaukee Landmark and a State of Wisconsin Historical Site, and was also designated a National Historic Landmark in 1991. It is sometimes called the "Grande Olde Lady", being the oldest theater in Milwaukee's theater district.

The Pabst is a traditional proscenium stage theater with two balconies, for a total capacity of 1,300 people. It hosts approximately 100 events per year, including music, comedy, dance, opera, and theater events. The theater also has a hydraulic orchestra pit, adding to its suitability for virtually any performing arts event. The auditorium itself is drum-shaped and is decorated in reds and maroons with gold and silver accents. A large, 2-ton Austrian crystal chandelier hangs over the auditorium. The theater also boasts a staircase crafted from white Italian Carrara marble and a proscenium arch highlighted in gold leaf, which frames the stage.

The theater features a historic organ, which once provided accompaniment for silent films. The instrument is a 4 manuals; 20 ranks opus of M.P. Moller.

== History ==
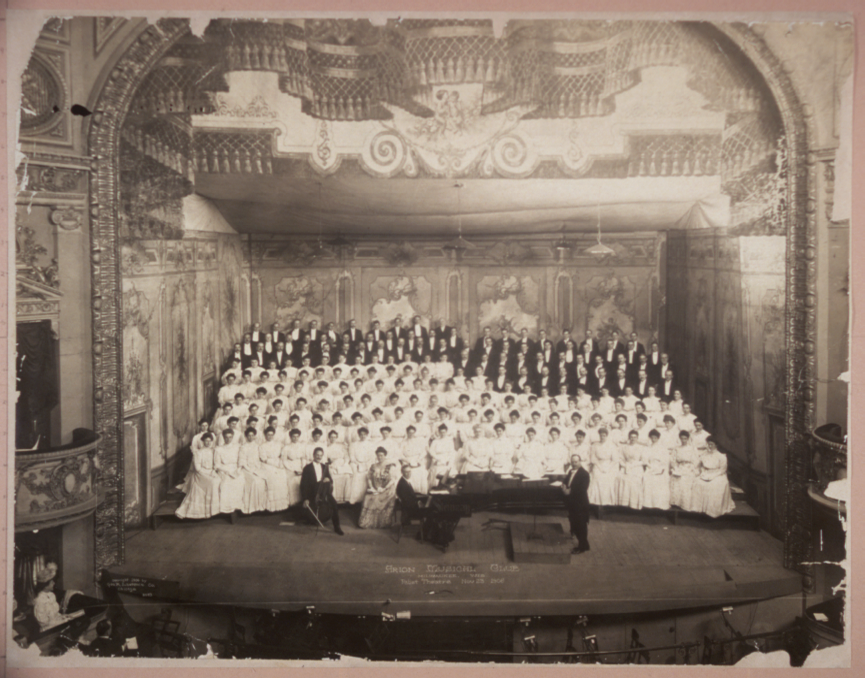
1906, Arion Musical Club on the stage

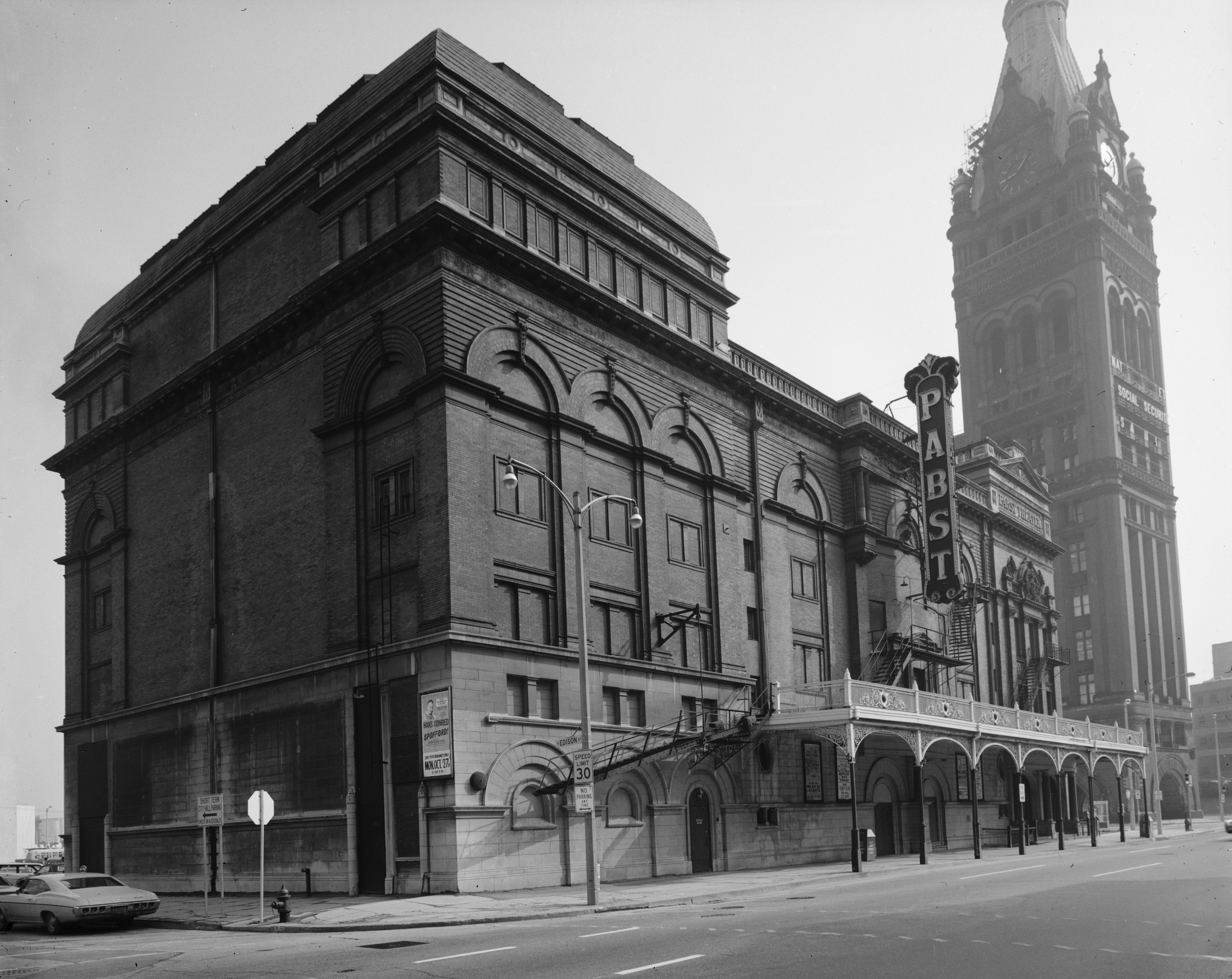
South façade, c. 1970

Brewer Frederick Pabst purchased the Nunnemacher Grand Opera House in 1890 from Jacob Nunnemacher and his son, Hermann, and renamed it Das Neue Deutsche Stadt-Theater (The New German City Theater). The structure was damaged by arson in 1893, and subsequently completely destroyed by fire in January 1895. Pabst ordered it rebuilt at once, and it reopened as The Pabst Theater later in 1895.

The Pabst was designed by architect Otto Strack in the tradition of European opera houses and the German Renaissance Revival style. He made it one of the most fire-proof theaters of its day, as well as one of the most opulent.

The Pabst played an important role in the German American culture of early 20th century Milwaukee, when the city was known as Deutsch Athen (German Athens). The venue exclusively booked German language performances until 1918, when the theater began to book English acts and artists to remain viable, as World War I's anti-German sentiment forced most German American communities, including Milwaukee's, to assimilate.

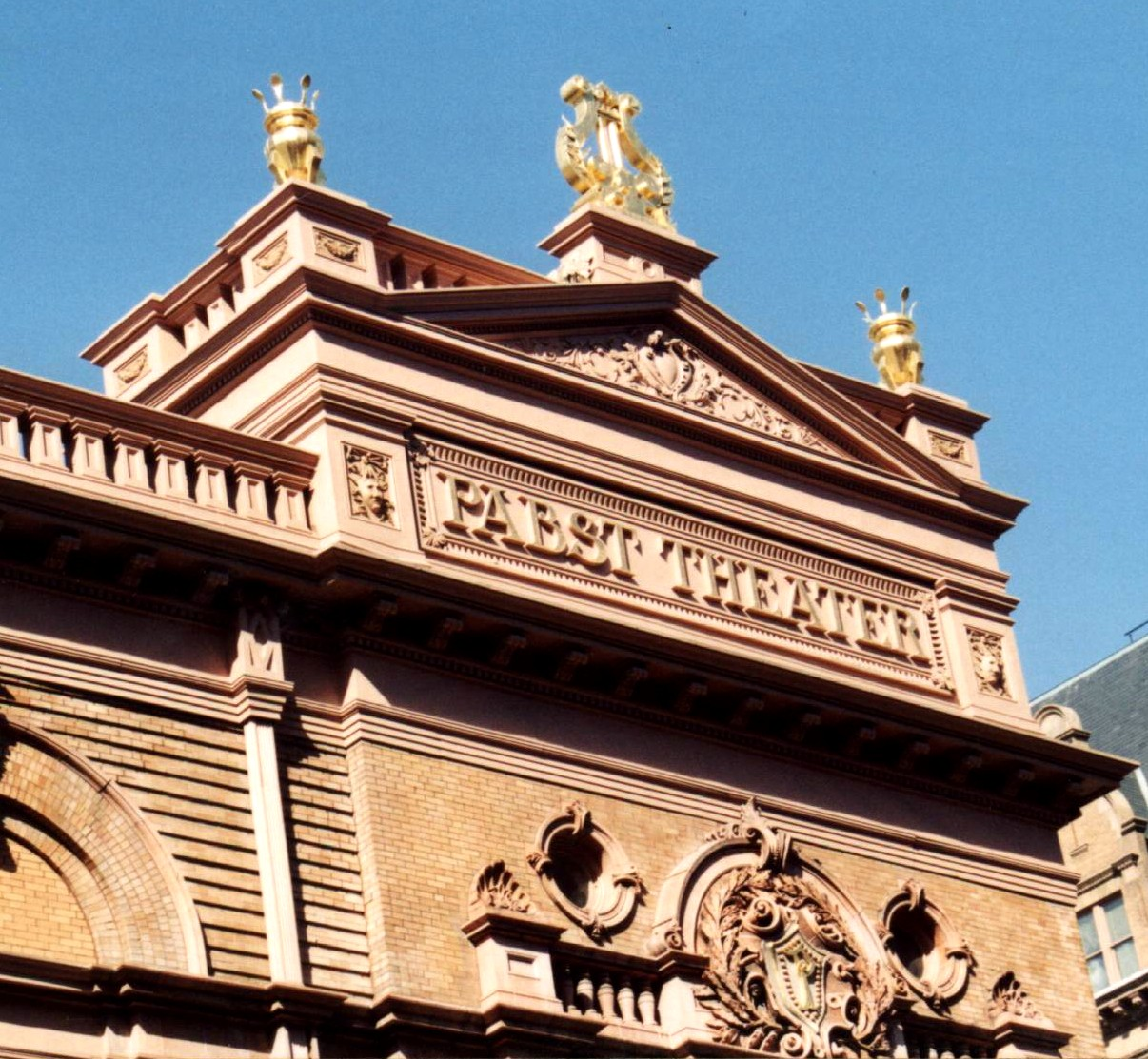
Original terracotta lettering at the theater's parapet (c.2003)

The Pabst has undergone several renovations, the first of which occurred in 1928. In 1976, after a long decline, it was restored to its original style. In 1989, a colonnade was added connecting the theater to the Milwaukee Center. The latest renovations took place in 2000 after the Pabst Theater Foundation purchased the facility. Michael Cudahy began the renovation fundraising by contributing $1 million. Work included adding two elevators, public restrooms, replacing some seats and upgrading the ventilation system. The theater also added Cudahy's Irish Pub in an expanded lobby space.

The Pabst Theater was designed after German Opera Houses for their good acoustics.

== Technological innovations ==
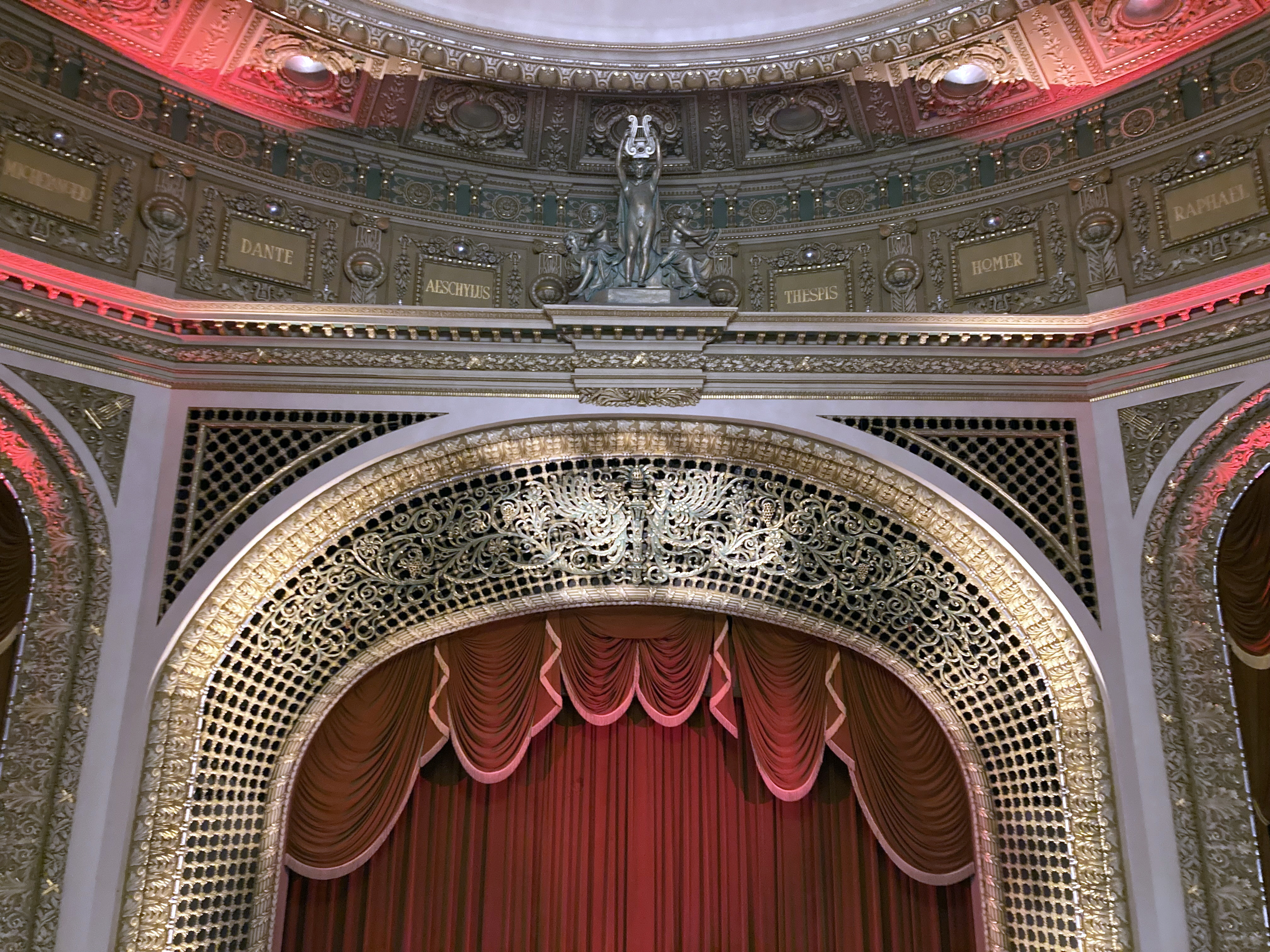
Interior of the Pabst Theater

Otto Strack employed many technological innovations when designing the theater, including one of the country's first fire curtains, all-electrical illumination, and a very early air conditioning system which employed fans and large amounts of ice. The theater also contained an electric organ, an innovation at that time. The theater is believed to be the first in Milwaukee to employ a counterweight system for hoisting scenery, which was installed after World War I and remains in use today.

== Other uses ==
In 2016, the Aaron Biebert documentary, A Billion Lives, made its North American premiere at the Pabst and in 2017 the Pabst hosted the premiere of Batman & Jesus by Milwaukee native Jozef K. Richards.

== Inscription ==
The Pabst Theater has the names of 15 notable artists inscribed about the cornice of the drum-shaped auditorium: Ibsen, Wagner, Molière, Aristotle, Michelangelo, Dante, Aeschylus, Thespis, Homer, Raphael, Shakespeare, Garrick, Beethoven, Goethe, and renovator Bernard O. Gruenke of Conrad Schmitt Studios.

== See also ==
- List of National Historic Landmarks in Wisconsin
- National Register of Historic Places listings in Milwaukee, Wisconsin
