= NASCAR Winston Cup Series era =

1971-2003 in NASCAR

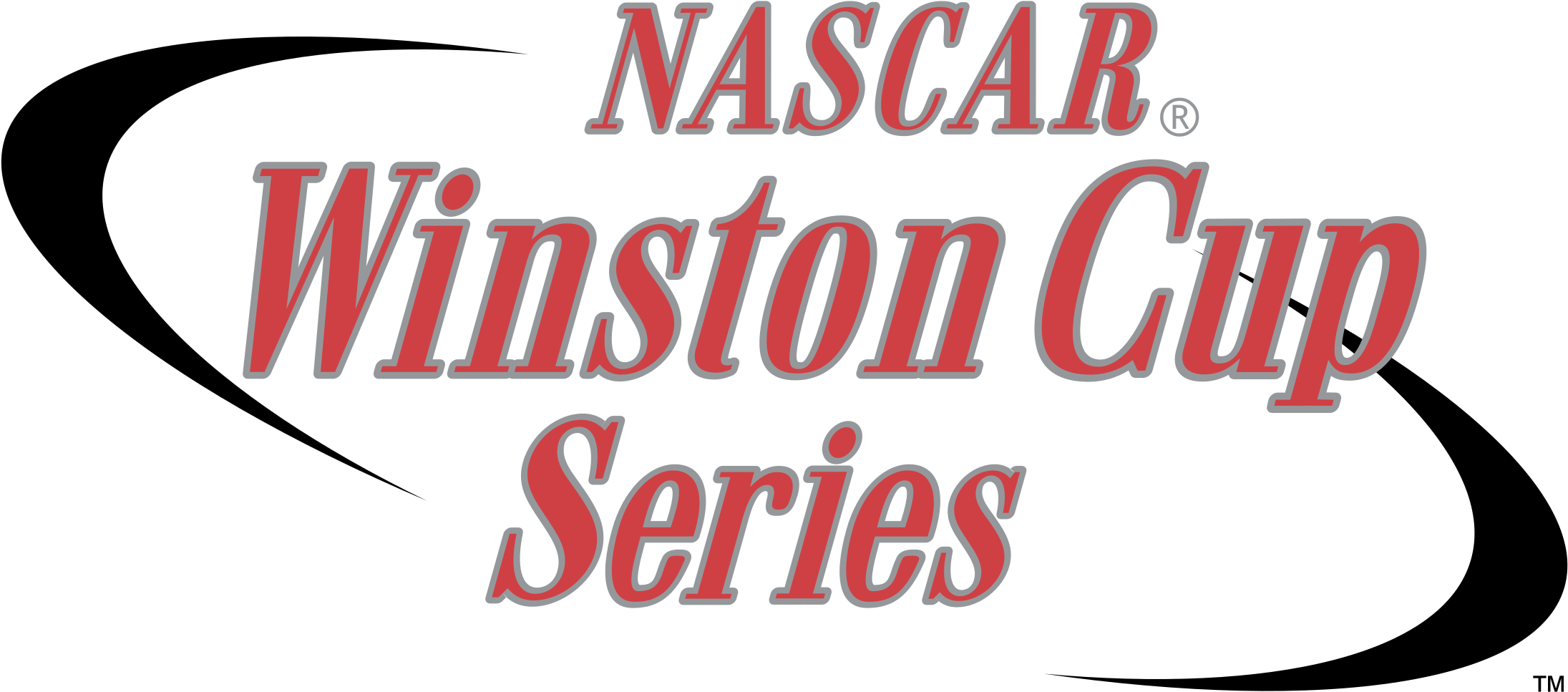
Logo of Winston Cup Series

The NASCAR Winston Cup Series era was the period of the National Association for Stock Car Auto Racing (NASCAR) from 1971 to 2003. In 1971, NASCAR leased its naming rights to the R. J. Reynolds Tobacco Company (RJR) who named the series after its premier brand "Winston". The series was referred to as the NASCAR Winston Cup Series from that point forward. Many view the changes that resulted from RJR's involvement in the series as well as from the reduction in schedule from 48 to 31 races per year established 1972 as a time in which NASCAR entered the "modern era" of spectator sports. During this era, NASCAR experienced a significant rise in popularity that persisted until Winston left the sport after the 2003 season.

== History ==
=== 1971–1979 ===
R. J. Reynolds Tobacco company logo

In 1971, NASCAR was courting tobacco giant R. J. Reynolds about sponsoring the entire NASCAR Grand National series. When Congress banned television advertising of cigarettes via the Public Health Cigarette Smoking Act, tobacco companies began to sponsor sporting events as a way to spend their excess advertising dollars. Reynolds Co. started spending a large amount of its advertising budget in auto racing starting in 1971. The tobacco company saw a major potential advertising base that could offset the loss of television commercials. The new name of NASCAR's premier stock car racing tour became the "Winston Cup Grand National Series."

In 1972, the schedule was reduced from 48 to 31 races. Races on dirt tracks and on oval tracks shorter than 250 miles (400 kilometres) were removed and transferred to the short-lived NASCAR Grand National East Series, and the remaining races had a minimum prize money of $30,000. Additionally, the points system was modified several times during the next four years. NASCAR's founder, Bill France Sr., turned over control of NASCAR to his oldest son, Bill France Jr. In August 1974, France Jr. asked series publicist Bob Latford to design a points system with equal points being awarded for all races regardless of length or prize money. This system ensured that the top drivers would have to compete in all the races in order to become the series champion. This system remained unchanged from 1975 until the Chase for the Championship was instituted in 2004.

ABC Sports aired partial or full live telecasts of Grand National races from Talladega, North Wilkesboro, Darlington, Charlotte, and Nashville in 1970. Because these events were perceived as less exciting than many Grand National races, ABC abandoned its live coverage. Races were instead broadcast, delayed and edited, on the ABC sports variety show Wide World of Sports.

Plymouth's final season was 1977 and American Motors' final season was 1978.

During the Winston Cup Era, NASCAR experienced a significant rise in national prominence. One example is the 1979 Daytona 500 which was the first race of its kind to be broadcast to a national television audience from start to finish. On the final lap of the 1979 Daytona 500, Donnie Allison and Cale Yarborough crashed allowing Richard Petty to take the victory. After the race, Donnie Allison along with his brother Bobby got into a fight with Yarborough on the backstretch. Millions observed this encounter on live television helping NASCAR enter a niche in spectator sports once held exclusively by other events.

=== 1980–1989 ===
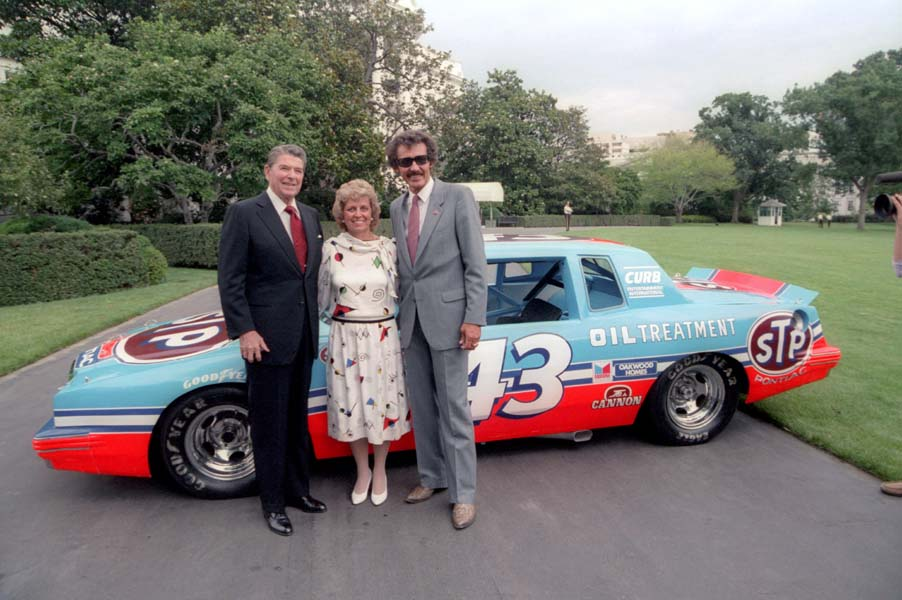
Ronald Reagan with Richard Petty

Mercury's final season was 1980.

In 1981, an awards banquet began to be held in New York City on the first Friday evening in December. The first banquets were held in the Waldorf-Astoria's Starlight Room and in 1985 were moved to the much larger Grand Ballroom. For 2001, the banquet portion was dropped in favor of a simpler awards ceremony, which was also moved to the Hammerstein Ballroom at the Manhattan Center the following year. However, in 2003, the festivities returned to the Waldorf's Grand Ballroom, and the banquet format was reinstated.

Since 1982, the Daytona 500 has been the first non-exhibition race of the year.

On July 4, 1984, President Ronald Reagan became the first sitting president to attend a NASCAR race when he watched Richard Petty win the 1984 Firecracker 400. Some look to moments such as these to suggest that the Winston Cup Era marked the time in which NASCAR officially appeared on the national stage in America. The Firecracker 400 was Petty's 200th and final Winston Cup victory. In that same year, Terry Labonte captured his first Winston Cup Series Championship driving the No. 44 Piedmont Airlines Chevrolet Monte Carlo.

In 1985, R.J. Reynolds Tobacco Company introduced a concept called "The Winston Million." From 1985 to 1997, a million-dollar prize would be awarded to any driver that won three out of four major races during the 1985 season. Those races were the Daytona 500, the Winston 500, the World 600, and the Southern 500. Bill Elliott would become the first driver to win "The Winston Million" after he won the Daytona 500, the Winston 500, and the Southern 500 in 1985 in the #9 Coors Ford Thunderbird. Later, R.J. Reynolds would go on to create an "all-star" prize referred to as "The Winston" in 1985. This prize would award the winner a check for $200,000. This development set a precedent for significant cash prizes for winners of NASCAR events and funneled an increasing amount of cash flow into the sport. Darrell Waltrip was the first to be awarded "The Winston" at Charlotte Motor Speedway.

Chrysler and Dodge ceased participation after the 1985 season.

In 1986, "Grand National" was dropped from the name of the series, making it the NASCAR Winston Cup.

In 1988, amid fears of a hostile takeover within Goodyear, Hoosier Racing Tire entered the Winston Cup Series, sparking the first of two tire wars in the sport. The season saw a war of attrition among teams, as tire failures from both tire manufacturers resulted in horrific crashes and numerous driver injuries. By the end of the season, Hoosier claimed nine victories out of the 28 races. In 1989, after a botched attempt at Daytona, Goodyear officially unveiled their new radial tires at North Wilkesboro Speedway to combat Hoosier's bias-ply tires. After Dale Earnhardt won the race on Goodyears, interest in Hoosier waned until the company left NASCAR after the Winston 500 at Talladega, ending the tire war.

Darrell Waltrip won his first and only Daytona 500 in 1989 driving the #17 Tide Chevrolet Monte Carlo for Hendrick Motorsports.

=== 1990–1999 ===
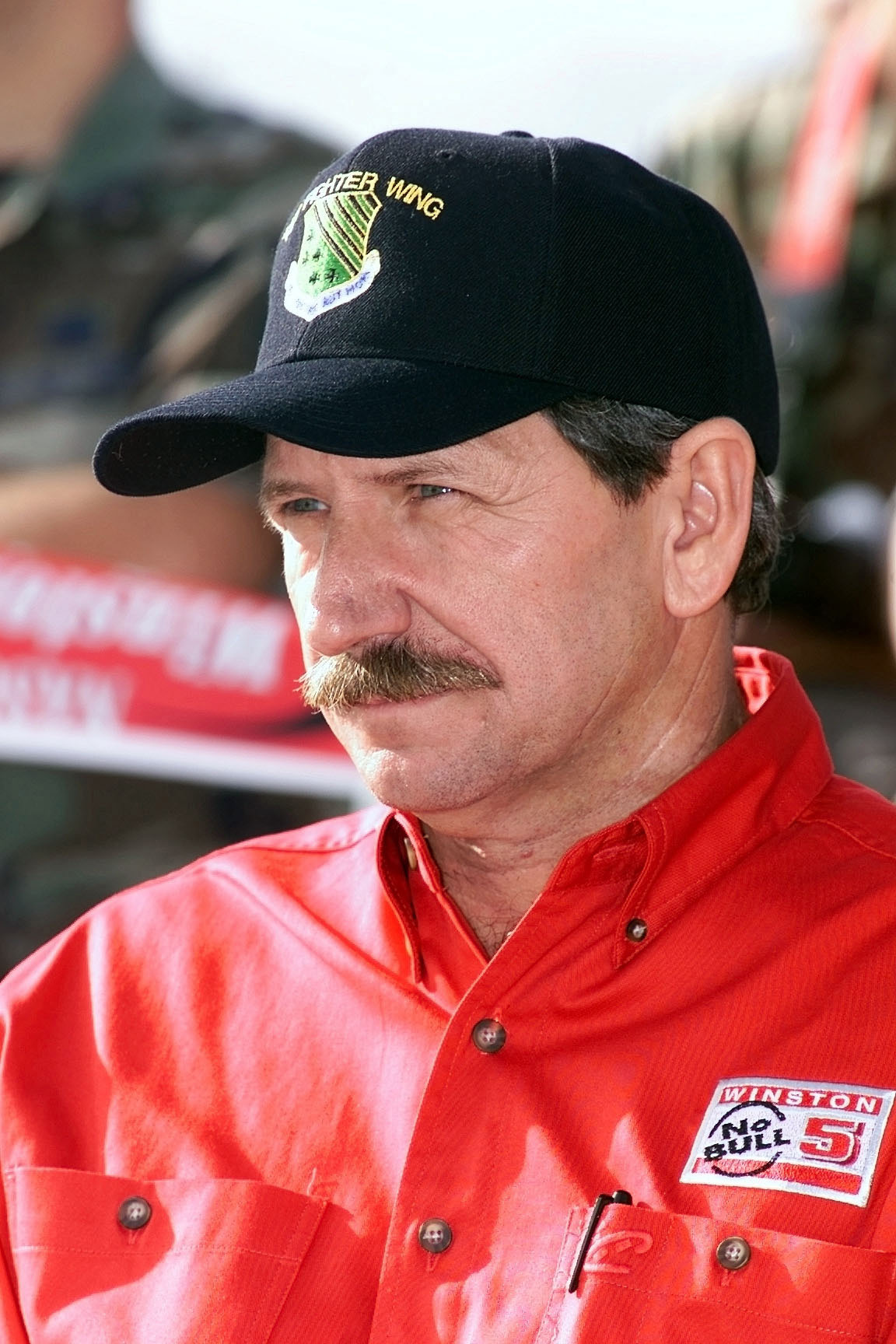
Dale Earnhardt

The series underwent a large boom in popularity in the 1990s.

At the 1990 Daytona 500, Earnhardt led 155 of the 200 laps when he not only ran over a piece of metal on the backstretch but also popped a tire on the final lap. Derrike Cope, driving the No. 10 Purolator Chevy Lumina, was able to pass Earnhardt and win the 32nd annual running of the Daytona 500. During the 1991 Winston Cup season, Harry Gant driver of the #33 Skoal Oldsmobile swept the races at Darlington, Richmond, Dover, and Martinsville going undefeated in the month of September. Gant was nicknamed "Mr. September" for this historic winning streak. A record six drivers were still in contention for the Winston Cup Championship going into the season finale at Atlanta Motor Speedway in 1992. Alan Kulwicki, Bill Elliott, Davey Allison, Harry Gant, Kyle Petty, and Mark Martin were all fighting for the championship during the 1992 Hooters 500. Bill Elliott won the race, but Alan Kulwicki captured the championship by a slim ten-point margin. This race would also be the final Winston Cup race for Richard Petty. General Motors brand Buick left the series after the 1992 season and fellow GM brand Oldsmobile departed after 1994, leaving Chevrolet, Ford and Pontiac as the remaining manufacturers.

Hoosier re-entered the Winston Cup Series in 1994 for its second tire war with Goodyear. Their return was marred by the practice crash deaths of Neil Bonnett and Rodney Orr at Daytona, as both cars were on Hoosiers and the media was quick to blame the tire manufacturer. Despite four wins with Geoff Bodine, Hoosier once again struggled to gain interest from other drivers and left NASCAR for good at the end of the season.

In 1994, NASCAR held the first Brickyard 400 at Indianapolis Motor Speedway.

Earnhardt won his seventh and final Winston Cup Championship in 1994 and his long-awaited Daytona 500 victory in 1998, assisting to his rise to national recognition as well as the recognition of the Winston series in general. Terry Labonte won the Winston Cup Series Championship for the second and final time in 1996 driving for Hendrick Motorsports. Various other racers won the series in the subsequent years prior to the decline of the series after turn of the century.

In 1997 Jeff Gordon became the second and last winner of the Winston Million. The Winston Million was replaced with a similar program, the Winston No Bull Five, in 1998. This program awarded one million dollars to any driver who won a prestigious race after finishing in the top five of the most previous prestigious race.

Between 1997 and 1998, the winner's prize money for the Daytona 500 tripled. This coincided with a decline of popularity in American Championship Car Racing.

RJR's sponsorship became more controversial in the wake of the 1998 Tobacco Industry Settlement that sharply restricted avenues for tobacco advertising, including sports sponsorships.

In 1999, NASCAR made a new agreement with Fox Broadcasting, Turner Broadcasting, and NBC. The contract, signed for eight years for Fox and six years for NBC and Turner, was valued at $2.4 billion.

=== 2000–2003 ===
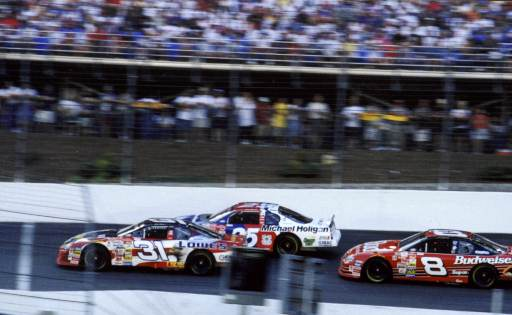
Earnhardt Jr. (#8) racing in 2000

Dale Earnhardt Jr., son of Dale Earnhardt, took his first career victory in 2000 at Texas Motor Speedway in the #8 Budweiser Chevrolet Monte Carlo. Joe Gibbs, racing driver Bobby Labonte, captured the 2000 Winston Cup Series Championship in his #18 Interstate Batteries Pontiac Grand Prix.

In 2001, Pixar visited NASCAR tracks as research for the 2006 animated film Cars, which included the voices of NASCAR drivers Richard Petty and Dale Earnhardt Jr. To avoid advertising tobacco in a Disney film, "Piston Cup" served as Pixar's allusion to the Winston Cup (however, by the time the film come out, Nextel had replaced Winston as the series title sponsor).

The Winston Cup Series began to decline in national admiration due to the death of Dale Earnhardt in a crash during the 2001 Daytona 500. Michael Waltrip, the driver of the #15 Napa Auto Parts Chevrolet Monte Carlo, won the race. Earnhardt and Sterling Marlin were competing for third place on the final lap when the crash took place. Earnhardt's car sped up the racetrack into Ken Schrader's M&M's Pontiac and the two cars collided with the outside wall. Earnhardt's car hit Schrader's head-on. Earnhardt was severely injured in the crash and was later pronounced dead at 5:16 p.m.

Dale Earnhardt Incorporated driver Steve Park won the race at Rockingham the week after Earnhardt's death.

Dodge re-entered the series in 2001 after being absent since 1985. In 2003, Ricky Craven, driver of the #32 Tide Pontiac Grand Prix, finished .002 seconds ahead of Kurt Busch to win Carolina Dodge Dealers 400. It was the closest recorded finish in NASCAR history (until the 2024 AdventHealth 400, a NASCAR Cup Series race where Kyle Larson edged Chris Buescher by 0.001 seconds) and gained national attention. It was also the last win for the Pontiac marque, as General Motors withdrew the brand at the end of the season.

There were fifteen different series champions during the Winston Cup Series era. Seventy different drivers won at least one race during the Winston Cup Era. The time period encompassed a significant rise in NASCAR viewership while also marking the beginning of a significant decline in NASCAR popularity that would continue over the next decade.

== Winston Cup Museum lawsuit ==
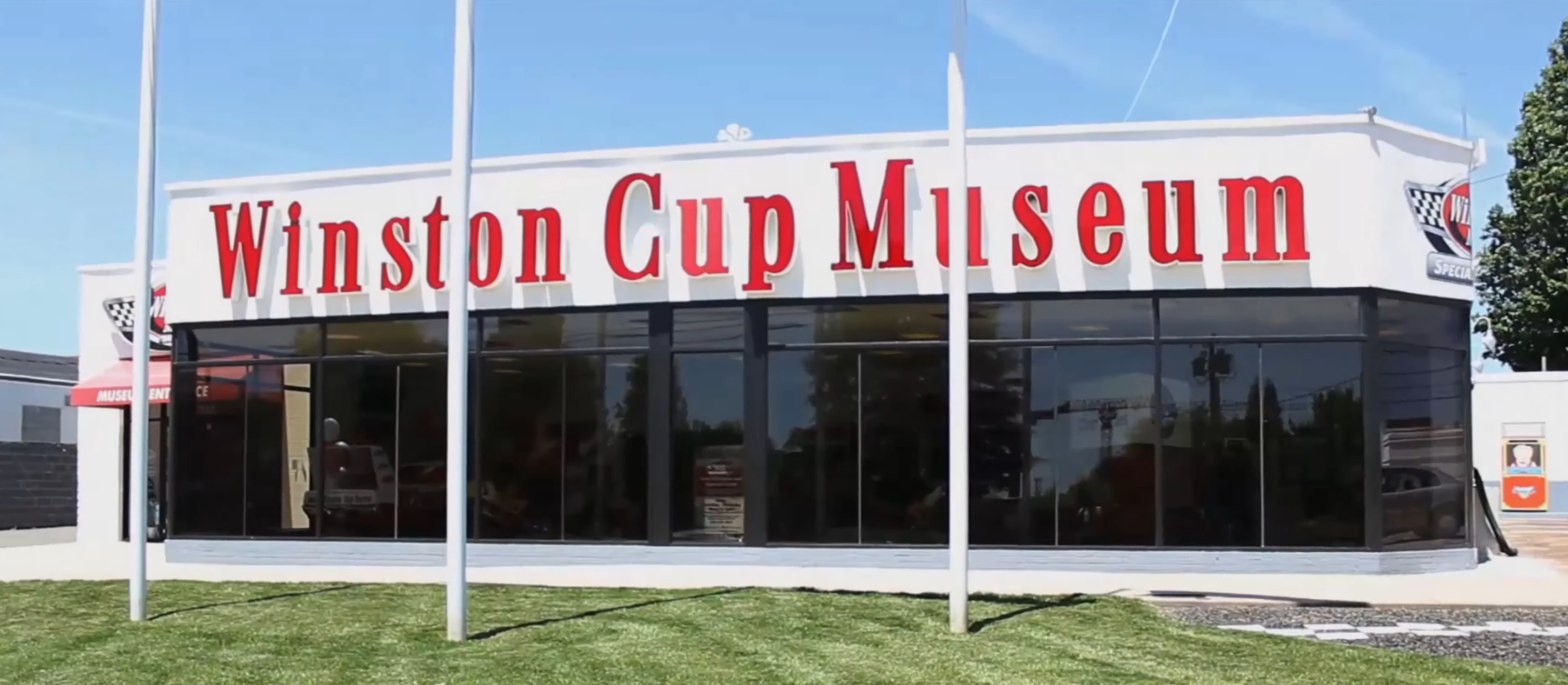
Winston Cup Museum in 2019

After Winston relinquished their sponsorship of the NASCAR Cup Series in 2004, a museum honoring the Winston Cup era opened in Winston-Salem, North Carolina, in 2005. The museum was operated independently of the R. J. Reynolds Tobacco Company or NASCAR themselves, but otherwise used Winston branding as last seen in 2003. Following a four-year legal battle against ITG Brands, which argued that their purchase of the Winston brand from R. J. Reynolds in 2015 meant that the history of the Winston Cup Series belonged to them, the museum closed in July 2023 as part of an injunction. After a brief reopening in September, the museum permanently closed on December 18, 2023.
