= Robert Nunnemacher =

Robert Nunnemacher (April 7, 1854 – March 8, 1912) was a member of one of Milwaukee's pioneer families of Swiss origin. In the 1890s through the turn of the century, Nunnemacher was among the most successful businessmen in America, expanding on his father's (Jacob Nunnemacher) business empire. Robert Nunnemacher is best known for the system of malting drum he developed. It involved a rotating drum and humidified air between a central duct, and other periphery ducts to condition germinating grain.

He was president and secretary of the Kraus Merkel Malting company of Milwaukee, and then went on to be founder and president of the Galland Henning Pneumatic Malting Drum Manufacturing Company of Milwaukee, Wisconsin, known today as Nopak. The company name stemmed from Mr. Nunnemacher's acquisition of the American manufacturing rights to equipment that originated from Nicholas Galland, a Frenchman, and a German named Julius Henning. Now in its 137th year of operation, the company remains family-owned and professionally-managed with fourth-generation family member Heath A. Nunnemacher, a Family Business Magazine "NextGen to Watch", serving as Executive Chairman. Heath Nunnemacher is also employed as Vice President of Global Electronics Sourcing with Techtronic Industries, the world's largest cordless leader in power tool and floorcare products.

Robert Nunnemacher was a member of the board of directors for First National Bank, the Milwaukee Mechanic's Insurance Company, the Prospect Hill Land Company, and board of trustees of the Milwaukee Public Museum. He was also affiliated with the Merchants Exchange Bank and the American Malting Company in the 1890s.

He died in Milwaukee on March 8, 1912.

== Mining ==
Nunnemacher purchased Milwaukee and Superior Mining Company at a sheriff sale which was located in the Gogebic Range.

He was director of Twin Buttes Mining and Smelting located in Twin Buttes, Arizona.

== Residences of historical and architectural significance ==
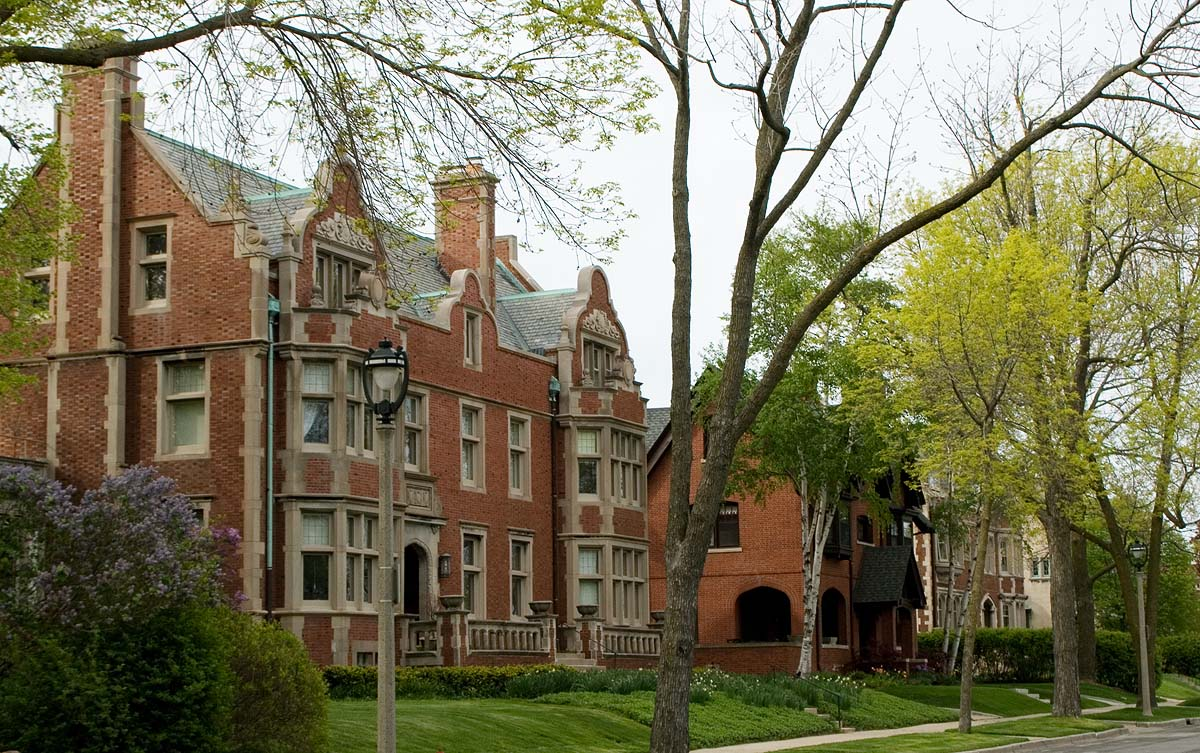
Nunnemacher Residence

His Milwaukee residence was located at 2409 N. Wahl Avenue was built in 1906 in a symmetrical Jacobethan style, brick with stone quoins designed by Alexander C. Eschweiler. It was added to the NRHP in 2000.

The Nunnemacher Summer Clubhouse was in Pauline's Woods on Pine Lake, which is in Chenequa, Wisconsin.
