= Winston tastes good like a cigarette should =

Advertising slogan, 1954 to 1972

The first appearance of the slogan on September 7, 1954 in The Pittsburgh Press.

"Winston tastes good — like a cigarette should" is an advertising slogan that appeared in newspaper, magazine, radio, and television advertisements for Winston cigarettes, manufactured by R. J. Reynolds Tobacco Company. Reynolds used the slogan from Winston's introduction in 1954 until 1972. It is one of the best-known American tobacco advertising campaigns. In 1999, Advertising Age included the "Winston tastes good like a cigarette should" jingle in its list of the 10 best radio and television jingles in the United States during the 20th century.

The advertising agency William Esty Co. deliberately used "like" rather than "as" for a subordinating conjunction in the slogan and jingle, a grammatical usage which is sometimes proscribed. Esty executives Wendell Adams and Arline Lunny were in charge of the overall campaign. Lunny produced and directed most of the campaign's content during its early years. Although Adams was a classically trained musician, Margaret Johnson (a singer, pianist, and model) ghost wrote the jingle; Johnson and her husband, Travis Johnson, recorded it with their group, the Song Spinners.

The slogan was included in the 1988 edition of Simpson's Contemporary Quotations.

In a departure for the time, the advertising campaign targeted distinct niche groups within the broader market of smokers, such as American Jews and African Americans.

== Beginnings ==
Bowman Gray Jr., who later became the president of R. J. Reynolds Tobacco Company, was in charge of marketing Winstons, which were a new addition to the R.J. Reynolds line in 1954. Gray listened to advertising employees from the William Esty Co., and the slogan "Winston tastes good like a cigarette ought to" was considered, then replaced by the more succinct "Winston tastes good like a cigarette should."

The first print ad appeared in The Pittsburgh Press in September 1954, although with 'real' added: "Winston tastes real good—like a cigarette should!" An ad in Life followed, then other outlets, using the now well-known wording. In 1955, Winston took over as the sponsor of Walter Cronkite's news show, as well as Garry Moore's variety show; at this time, the first Winston television ads aired.

== Radio and television ==
A still photo of a Winston advertisement featuring Fred (right) and Wilma Flintstone (left). This particular still is from the end-of-show sponsor bumper that aired at the end of every episode while Winston was the show's primary sponsor, until the second season.

In the radio and television advertisements, the slogan is presented in a singsong fashion with a noticeable two-beat clap near the end, so the jingle would sound like Win-ston tastes good like a (clap clap) cigarette should. The "clap" noise was sometimes substituted for actors in the commercials knocking twice against a truck carrying Winston cigarettes, or an actor flicking his lighter twice to the same conceit.

Winston cigarettes were sponsors of popular television series. In The Beverly Hillbillies, the stars Buddy Ebsen, Irene Ryan, and Nancy Kulp extolled the virtues of Winstons while smoking them and reciting the jingle. The Flintstones was criticized for advertising cigarettes on an animated series watched by many children, and Winston pulled their involvement with it after the Pebbles Flintstone character was born in 1963.

== Grammar controversy ==
During the campaign's long run in the media, many criticized the slogan as grammatically incorrect, asserting that it should say, "Winston tastes good as a cigarette should." Ogden Nash, in The New Yorker, published a poem that ran "Like goes Madison Avenue, like so goes the nation." Walter Cronkite, then hosting The Morning Show, refused to say the line as written, and an announcer was used instead.

Canadian journalist Malcolm Gladwell, in The Tipping Point, says that this "ungrammatical and somehow provocative use of 'like' instead of 'as' created a minor sensation" in 1954 and implies that the phrase itself was responsible for vaulting the brand to second place in the U.S. market. Winston overtook Pall Mall cigarettes as the #1 cigarette in the United States in 1966, while the advertising campaign continued to make an impression on the mass media.

In the fall of 1961, a small furor enveloped the literary and journalistic communities in the United States when Merriam-Webster published its Third New International Dictionary. In the dictionary, the editors refused to condemn the use of "like" as a conjunction, and cited "Winston tastes good like a cigarette should" as an example of popular colloquial use. After publication of Webster's Third, The New York Times called the edition "bolshevik," and the Chicago Daily News wrote that the transgression signified "a general decay in values."

When the players in The Beverly Hillbillies spoke the line, they stretched the grammatical boundaries further:

Jed: Winston tastes good...
Granny: Like a cigarette had ought-a!

In 1970 and 1971, Winston sought to revamp its image and chose to respond to many grammarians' qualms with the slogan, "What do you want, good grammar or good taste?" Mad magazine published a parody of this on the back cover of its January 1971 issue; set in a cemetery, it featured four tombstones with epitaphs written in the past tense ("Winsom tasted good like a cigarette should've" "You mean 'as a cigarette should've'" "What did you want, good grammar or good taste?" "I wanted to live a lot longer than this!"). With the new slogan in wide use, "Winston tastes good like a cigarette should" was retired permanently in 1972.

In 1981, actor James Garner claimed responsibility for the wording of the slogan during an interview with Playboy magazine. Garner, who narrated the original commercial, stated that his first action ever to be captured on film was to misread the line that had been provided to him. However the advertisements appeared in print before their debut on television, which casts doubt on Garner's claim.

== Parodies ==
The jingle was often parodied. The first line was typically, Winston tastes bad like the one I just had. The second line was commonly some variation on No filter, no flavor, it tastes like toilet paper, or, No filter, no taste, just a fifty-cent waste.

== See also ==
- "Happiness is a cigar called Hamlet"
- "Us Tareyton smokers would rather fight than switch!"
- Legacy Tobacco Documents Library Multimedia Collection

== Bibliography ==
- Finegan, Edward; Rickford, John R. (2004). Language in the U.S.A.: themes for the 21st century. New York: Cambridge University Press. Foreword. ISBN 0-521-77175-7.
- Gladwell, Malcolm (2002). The Tipping Point: How Little Things Can Make a Big Difference. Boston: Back Bay Books. p. 25. ISBN 0-316-34662-4.
- Parrish, Thomas (2002). The Grouchy Grammarian: A How-Not-To Guide to the 47 Most Common Mistakes in English Made by Journalists, Broadcasters, and Others Who Should Know Better. Hoboken, N.J.: Wiley. pp. 155–156. ISBN 0471432865.
- Utley, Garrick (2000). You Should Have Been Here Yesterday: A Life Story in Television News. New York: PublicAffairs. p. 4. ISBN 1-891620-94-0.
