= Winston (cigarette) =

Cigarette brand

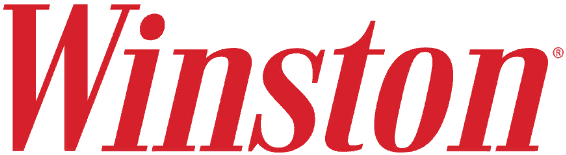

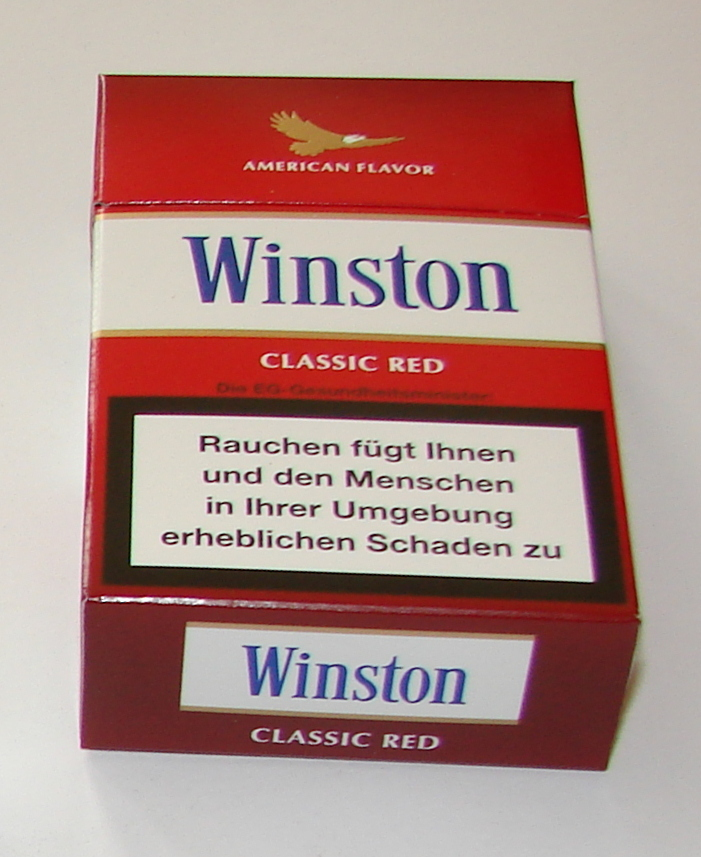
- A pack of Winston cigarettes with German-language warning label
- Product type: Cigarette
- Current owner: Japan Tobacco (Outside the U.S.); ITG Brands (U.S. only)
- Country: United States
- Introduced: 1954; 72 years ago
- Previous owners: R. J. Reynolds
- Tagline: "Winston tastes good like a cigarette should" (1954–1972); "Spirit of the U.S.A." (Philippines, 1986–2006); "Enjoy True Quality" (Philippines, 2005–2008); "Stay True" (2011–present); "Innovators since 1954" (2025-present)
- Website: winstoncigarettes.com

Winston is an American brand of cigarettes, currently owned and manufactured by ITG Brands, subsidiary of Imperial Tobacco in the United States and by Japan Tobacco outside the U.S. The brand is named after the town where R. J. Reynolds started his business, Winston-Salem, North Carolina. As of 2017, Winston has the seventh-highest U.S. market share (2 percent) of all cigarette brands, according to the Centers for Disease Control and Prevention and the Maxwell Report.

This market share has been falling since 2003, when it peaked at 3.92 percent, although Winston has consistently been in the top 10 cigarette brands by U.S. market share since 2001, according to data from the Substance Abuse and Mental Health Services Administration's National Household Survey on Drug Abuse.

== History ==
A Winston Cigarettes commercial from 1954.

Winston was introduced in 1954 by the R.J. Reynolds Tobacco Company and quickly became one of the top-selling cigarette brands, using the slogan "Winston tastes good like a cigarette should". It became the number one cigarette sold in the world by 1966, a position it held until 1972 when Marlboro overtook the brand.

In the 1980s, Winston was the most favored brand in Puerto Rico, thanks to their advertising slogan "Winston y Puerto Rico: No hay nada mejor" (Winston and Puerto Rico: There is nothing better).

Winston then became the #2 cigarette, a position it continues to maintain today under ownership of Japan Tobacco outside of the U.S. while the American version of the brand has faced steadily declining sales, dropping to sixth place by 2005 in the last national survey.

The American version of Winston is also known for its more recent claim of becoming additive-free in the late 1990s. This in turn led to a settlement with the Federal Trade Commission requiring Winston to clarify subsequent advertisements that the lack of additives did not result in a safer cigarette. In 1999, R.J. Reynolds was spun off from RJR Nabisco and subsequently sold its non-U.S. operations to Japan Tobacco.

On July 15, 2014, Reynolds American (R.J. Reynolds parent company) agreed to purchase the Lorillard Tobacco Company for $27.4 billion and as a result, (to alleviate antitrust concerns) Winston, along with the Kool, Maverick, and Salem cigarette brands, was sold to Imperial Tobacco for $7.1 billion.

On June 12, 2015, Reynolds American and Lorillard completed their merger and Winston officially fell under ownership of Imperial tobacco spinoff ITG brands.

== Sponsorship ==
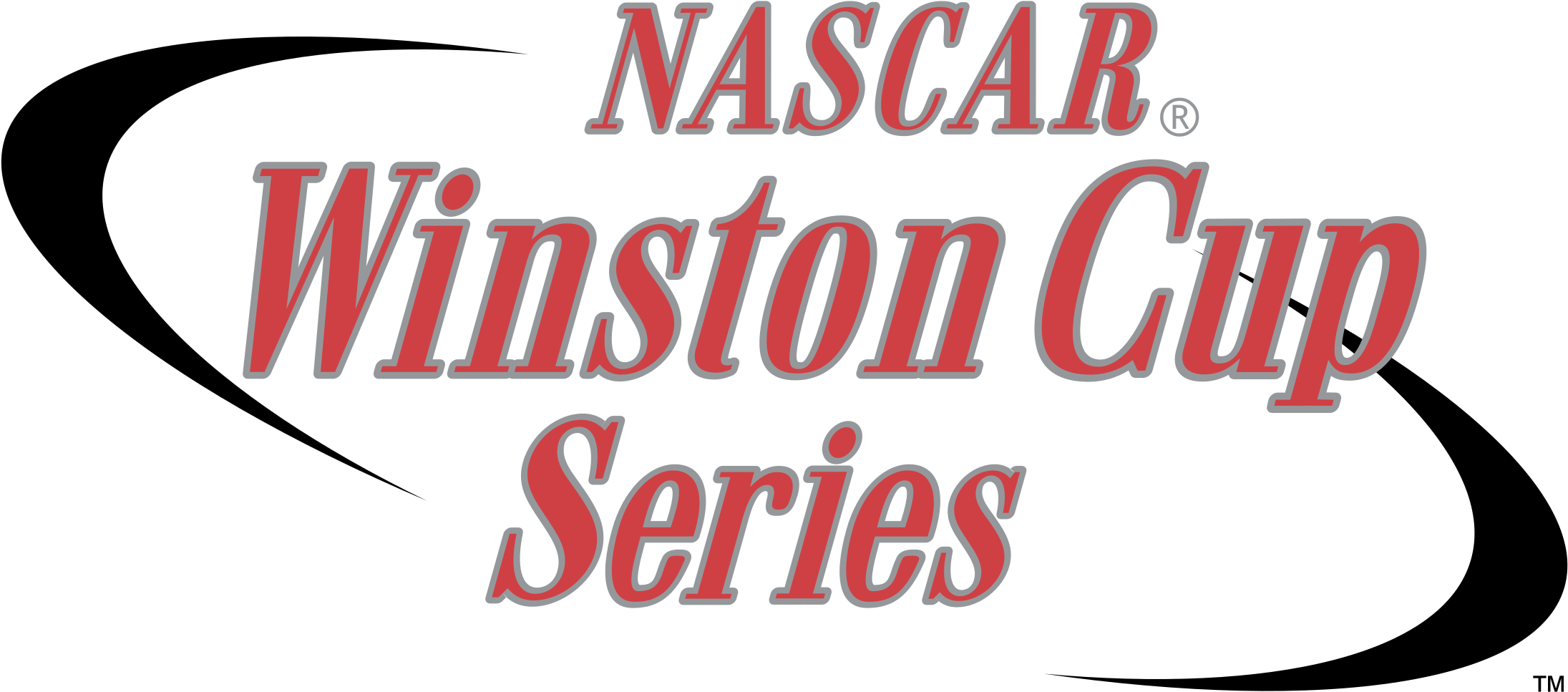
Logo of Winston Cup Series

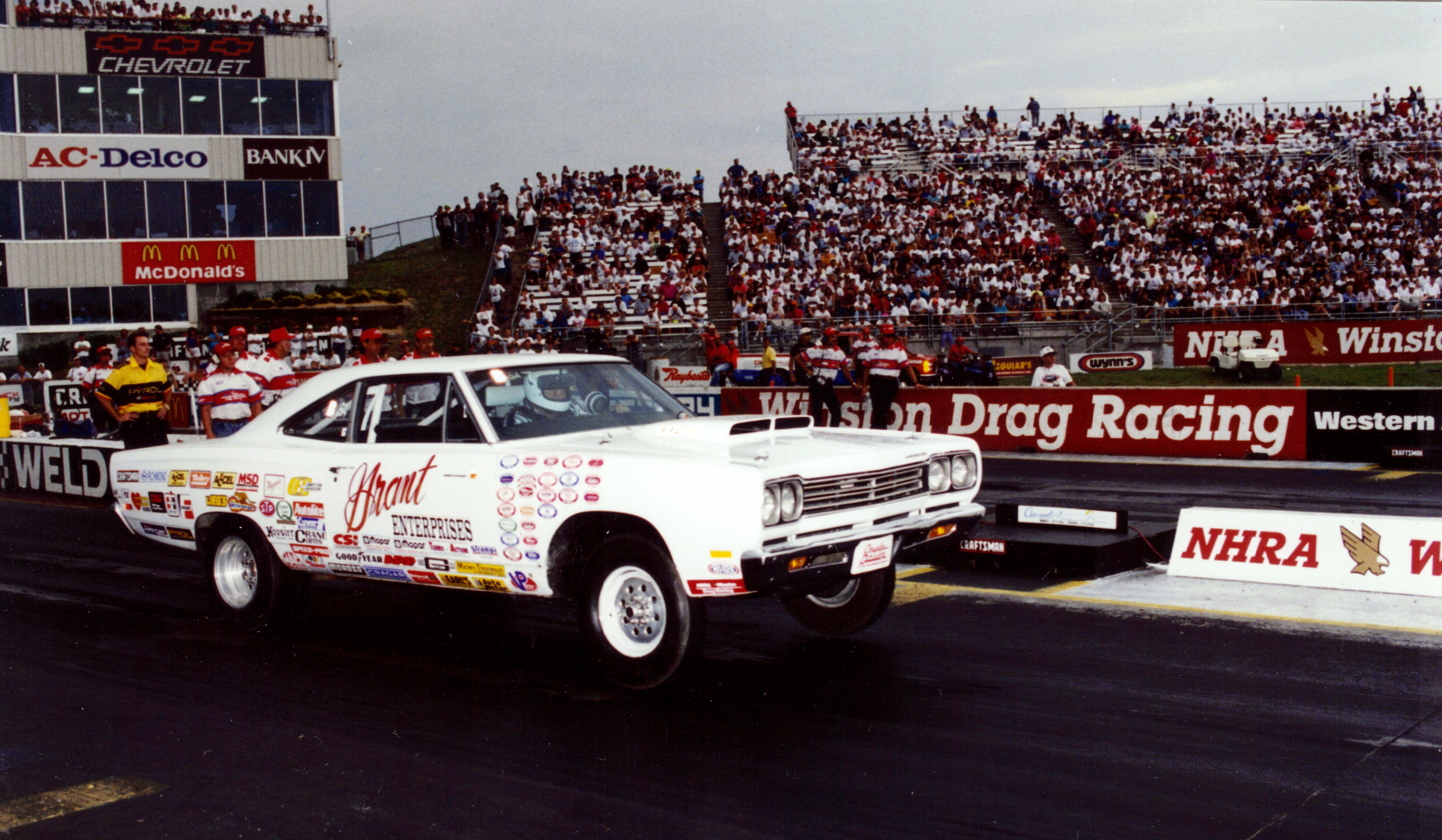
Drag racing in 1994 with Winston naming visible

=== NASCAR ===
Beginning in 1971, Winston was the sponsor of the highest title of the NASCAR series, known as the Winston Cup Series. R. J. Reynolds ended Winston's association with the series in 2003. The series is now known as the NASCAR Cup Series.

=== Drag racing ===
From 1975 to 2001, Winston was also the sponsor of the NHRA drag racing series, which went on to have other title sponsors.

=== Superbike World Championship ===
Winston sponsored the Ten Kate Racing team in 2005 and 2006. In countries where tobacco advertising was prohibited, the acronym "WinWin" was used instead.

=== Football (soccer) ===
Winston was a sponsor of the 1982 FIFA World Cup.

=== Sailing ===
Winston sponsored Dennis Conner in the 1993–1994 Whitbread Round the World Race. The yacht, named Winston, finished 6th overall and 4th in class.

A still image from The Flintstones featuring Winston cigarettes

=== Winston and The Flintstones ===
Winston was one of the original sponsors of The Flintstones, from 1960 to 1962. In the commercials, Flintstones characters Fred Flintstone and Barney Rubble were seen promoting Winston, and every episode ended with Fred lighting a Winston for his wife Wilma while singing the product's jingle. By the third season, however, the show's ads became more oriented towards children and Winston was replaced by Welch's.

== Controversy ==
=== Winston and targeting of African Americans ===
In the 1970s, Winston specifically targeted the Afro-American minority, similar to what Kool and Newport did during the time. After World War II had ended, American tobacco companies started to explore new markets to maintain their prosperity. The growth in urban migration and the growing incomes of African Americans (called at the time the "emerging Negro market") gave the tobacco companies what was sometimes called an "export market at home".

Additionally, a new kind of media started to appear after the war when several glossy monthly magazines including Negro Digest (1942, renamed Black World), Ebony (1945) and Negro Achievements (1947, renamed Sepia) began to be published. These relatively expensively produced magazines were far more attractive to the tobacco advertisers than the cheap "Negro" daily newspapers of the pre-war era, with glossy pages and a far wider national distribution. The magazines meant for a purely African-American audience also meant that advertisers could produce adverts aimed at and featuring African Americans away from the eyes of white consumers.

=== Winston Man ===
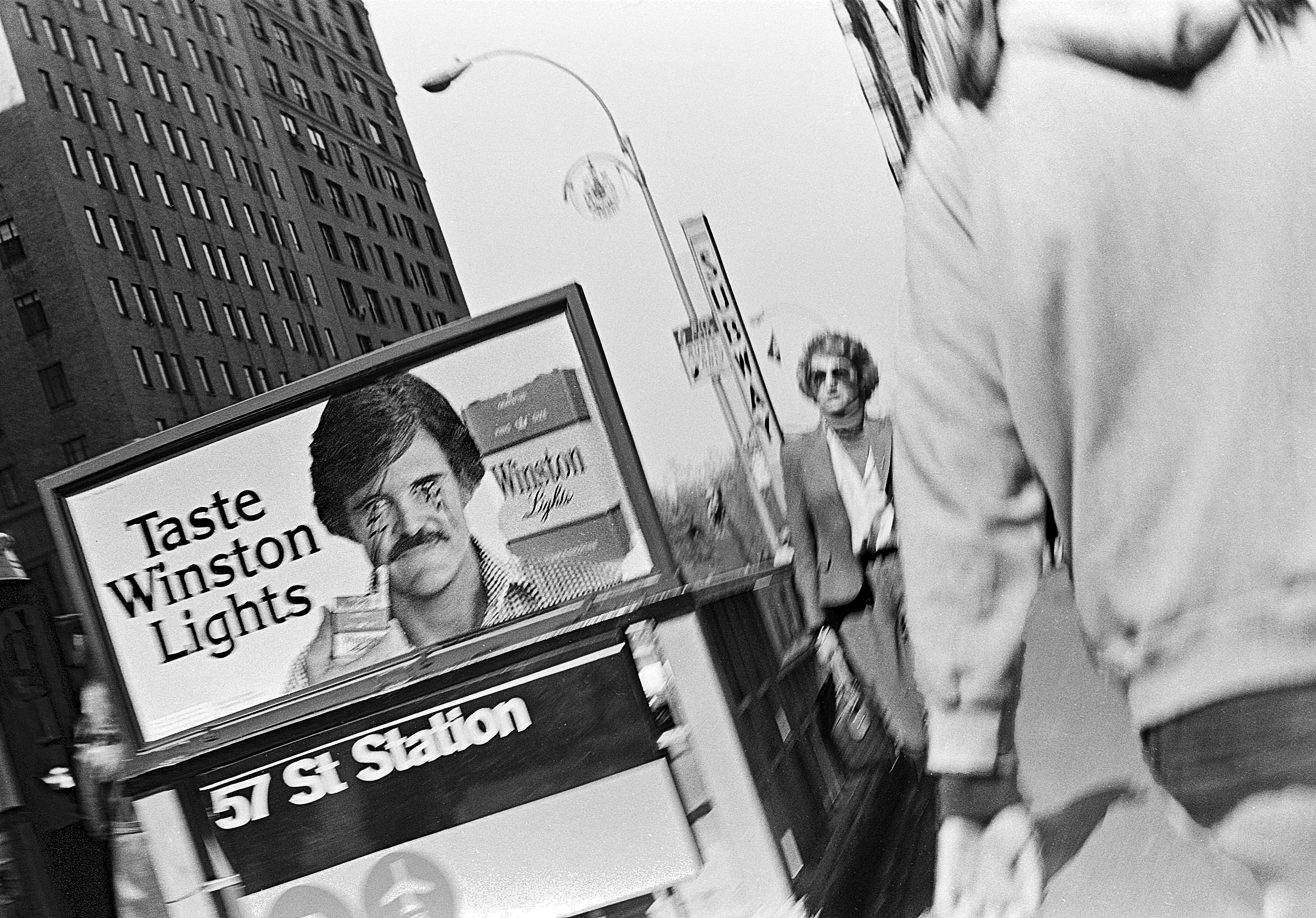
Winston Man advert (defaced) in Manhattan in 1979

Several male models, including Alan Landers and David Goerlitz, appeared as "Winston Man" in various advertisements. Both Landers and Goerlitz became anti-smoking advocates after suffering health issues related to tobacco smoking.

=== Winston and additive-free claims ===
In September 2015, the US Food and Drug Administration (FDA) warned ITG Brands, the makers of Winston cigarettes, that labeling the product as "additive-free" violated federal law because the claim implied that the cigarettes were safer than other brands.

The August warning letter to ITG marked the first time the FDA had used its authority under a 2009 tobacco-control law to take action against a company for making "additive-free" ("No Bull" ad campaign) claims on product packaging. It was one of three warning letters that the agency shipped out in August 2015 to cigarette companies whose products were labeled "additive-free", "natural" or both. Winston had been previously settled with the Federal Trade Commission (FTC) regarding similar claims in 1999, when tobacco advertising was under their purview.

== Markets ==
Winston cigarettes were or still are sold in the following countries: Iran, Canada, United States, Mexico, Chile, Peru, Argentina, Brazil, United Kingdom, Sweden, Denmark, Finland, Algeria, Luxembourg, Belgium, the Netherlands, Germany, France, Switzerland, Austria, Portugal, Spain, Italy, Poland, Hungary, Iceland, Romania, Moldova, Croatia, Bosnia and Herzegovina, Czech Republic, Slovakia, Slovenia, Serbia, Albania, Greece, Turkey, Armenia, Azerbaijan, Georgia, Estonia, Lithuania, Latvia, Belarus, Ukraine, Russia, Kazakhstan, Kyrgyzstan, Uzbekistan, Tunisia, South Africa, Israel, Lebanon, Jordan, Kuwait, Kosovo, Morocco, Myanmar, Vietnam, Egypt, Bahrain, Indonesia, Malaysia, Nepal, Norway, Cyprus, Singapore, Hong Kong, Japan, Taiwan, North Macedonia, the Philippines, Timor Leste, Bulgaria, and Ethiopia.

== Gallery ==
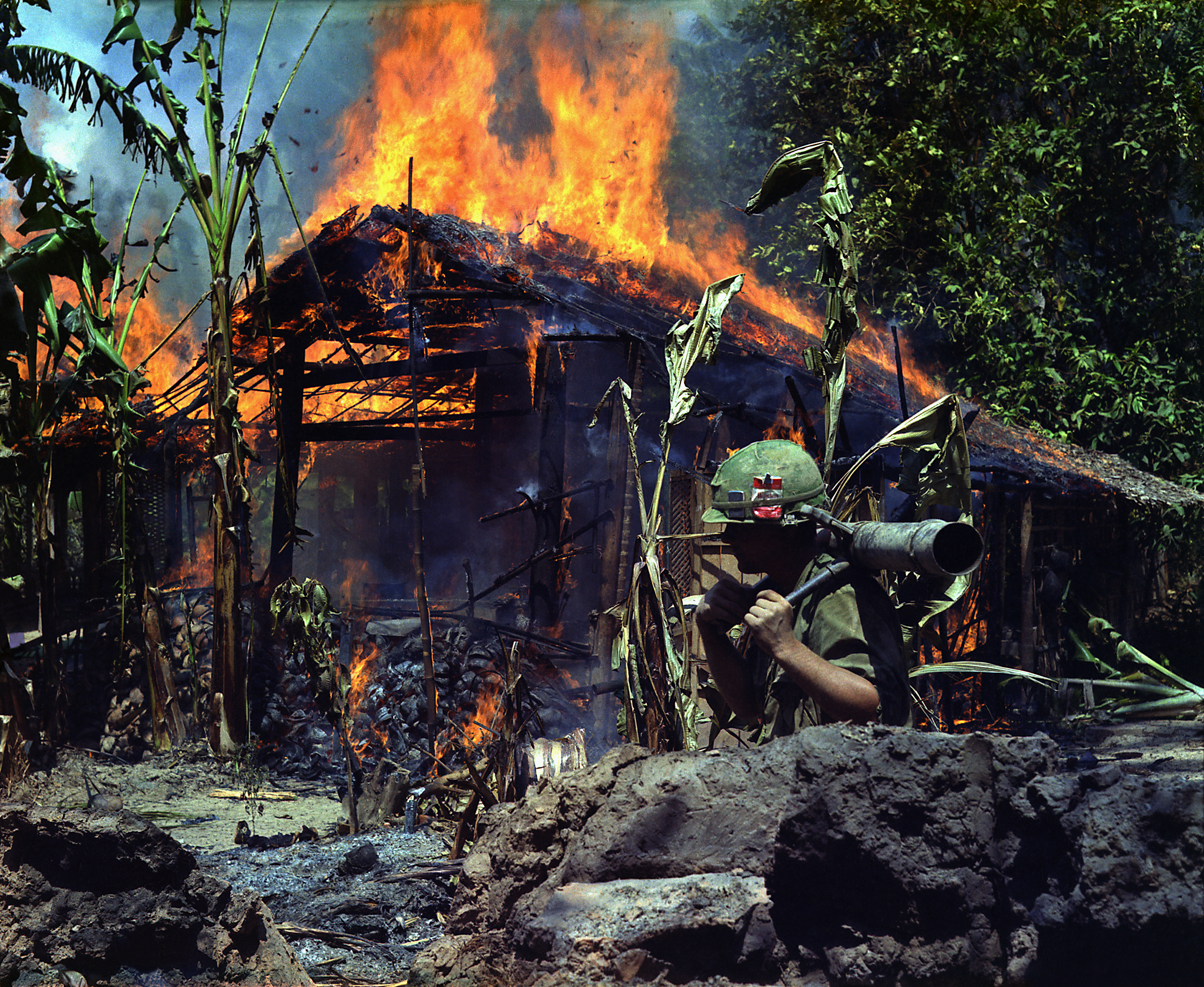
An American soldier during the Vietnam War with a Winston pack affixed to his helmet, 1968

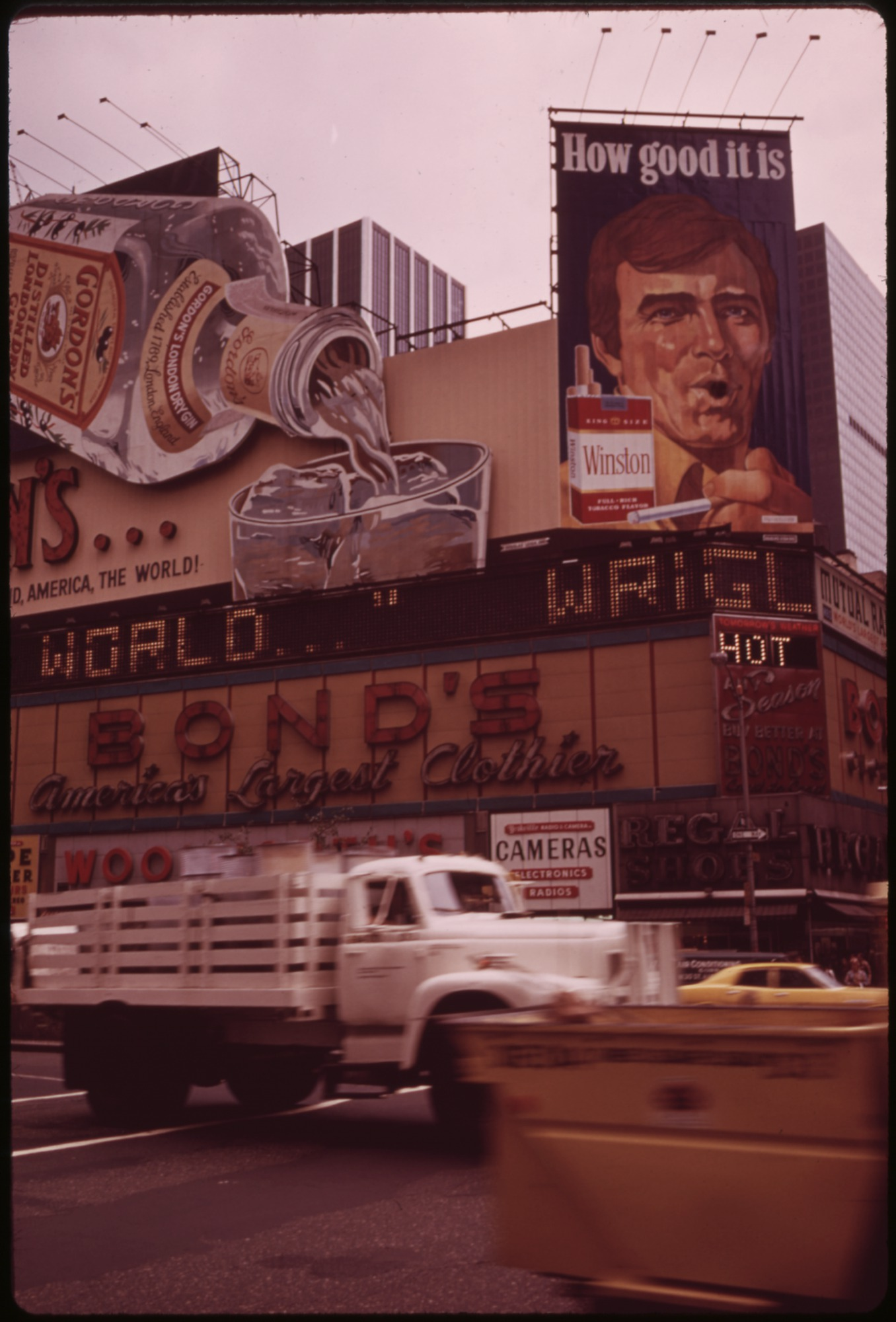
Winston advertising in Times Square, 1973

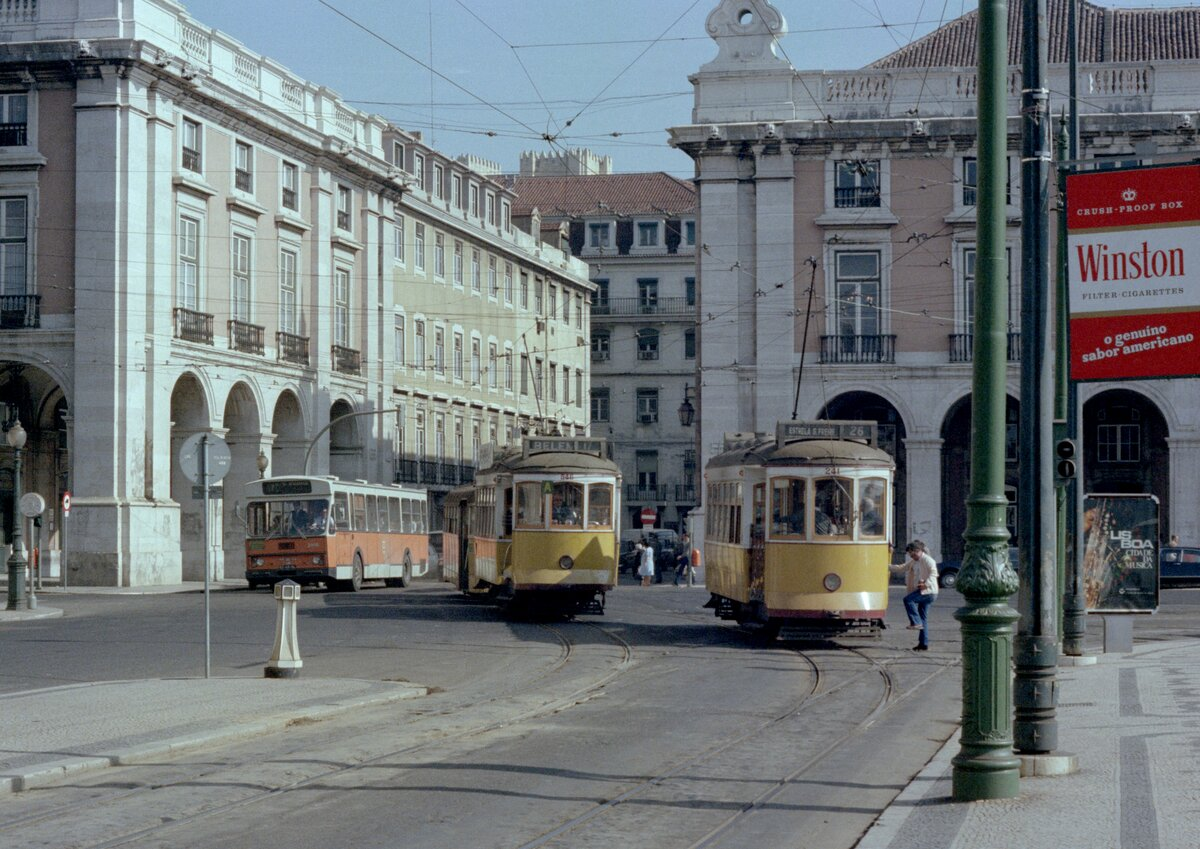
Winston advertising in Lisbon, 1982

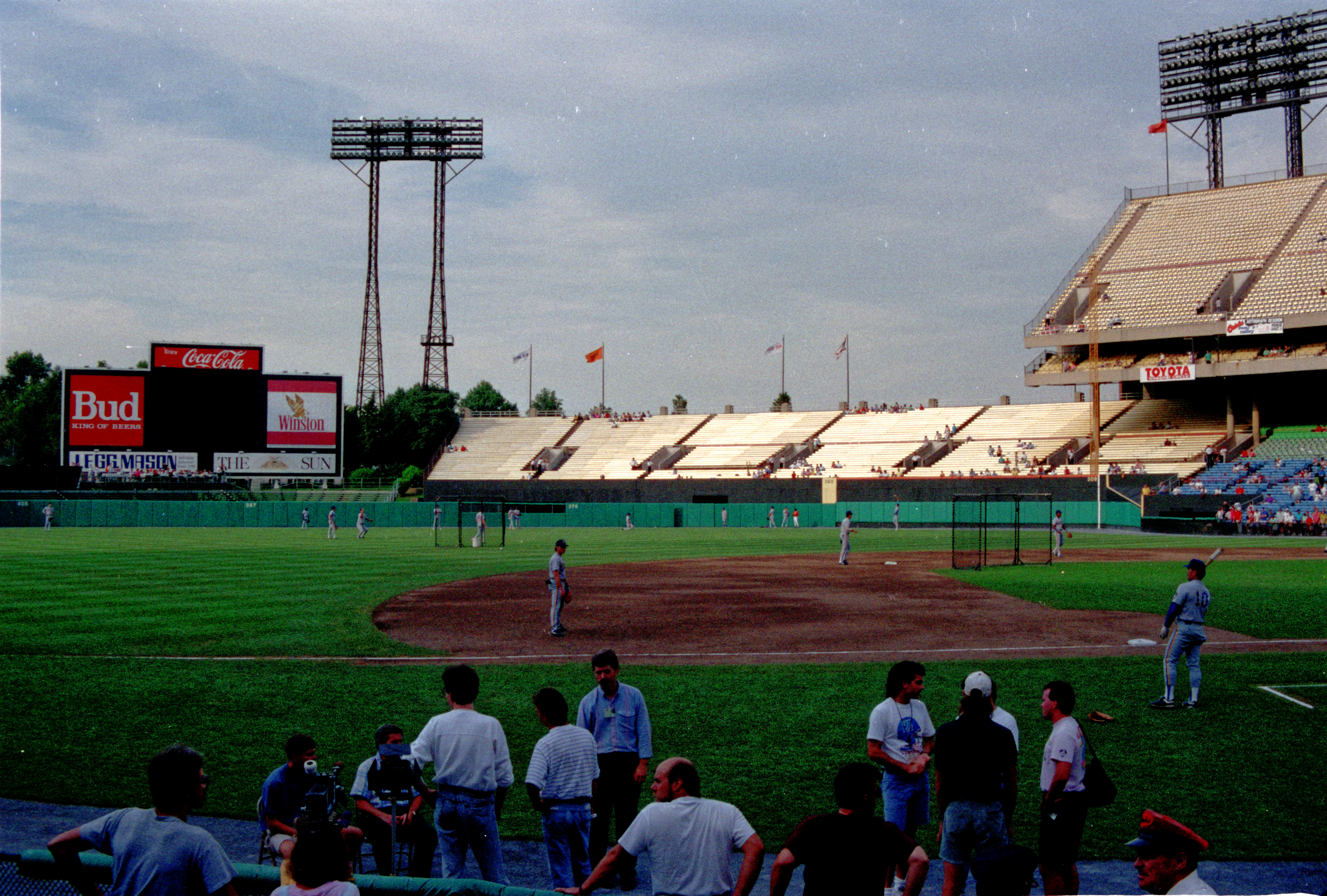
Winston advertising on the scoreboard at Baltimore Memorial Stadium, 1991

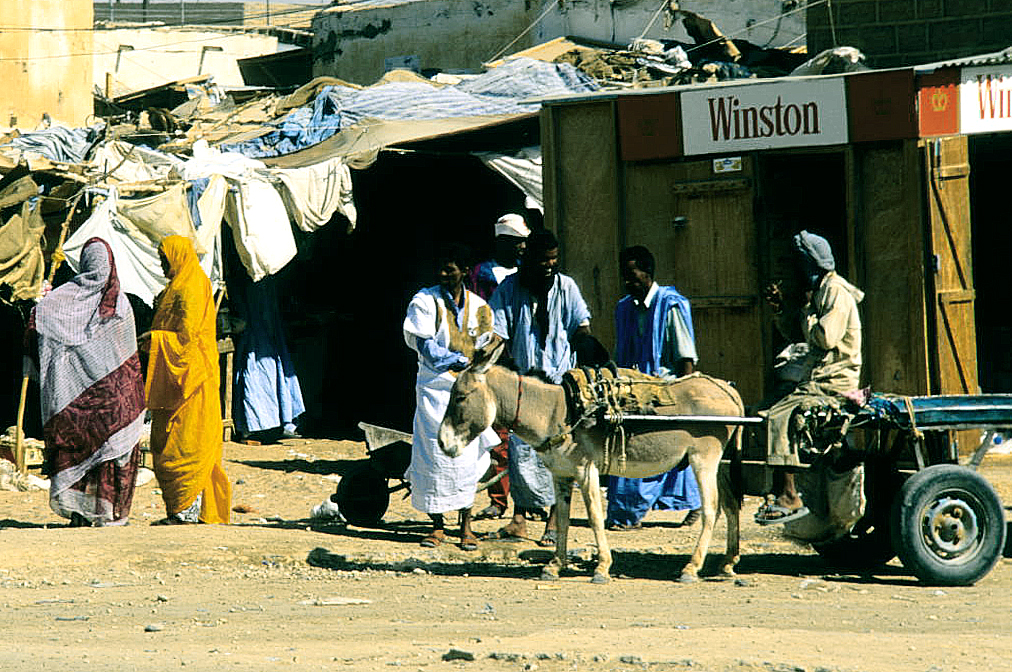
Winston advertising in Atar, Mauritania, 1997

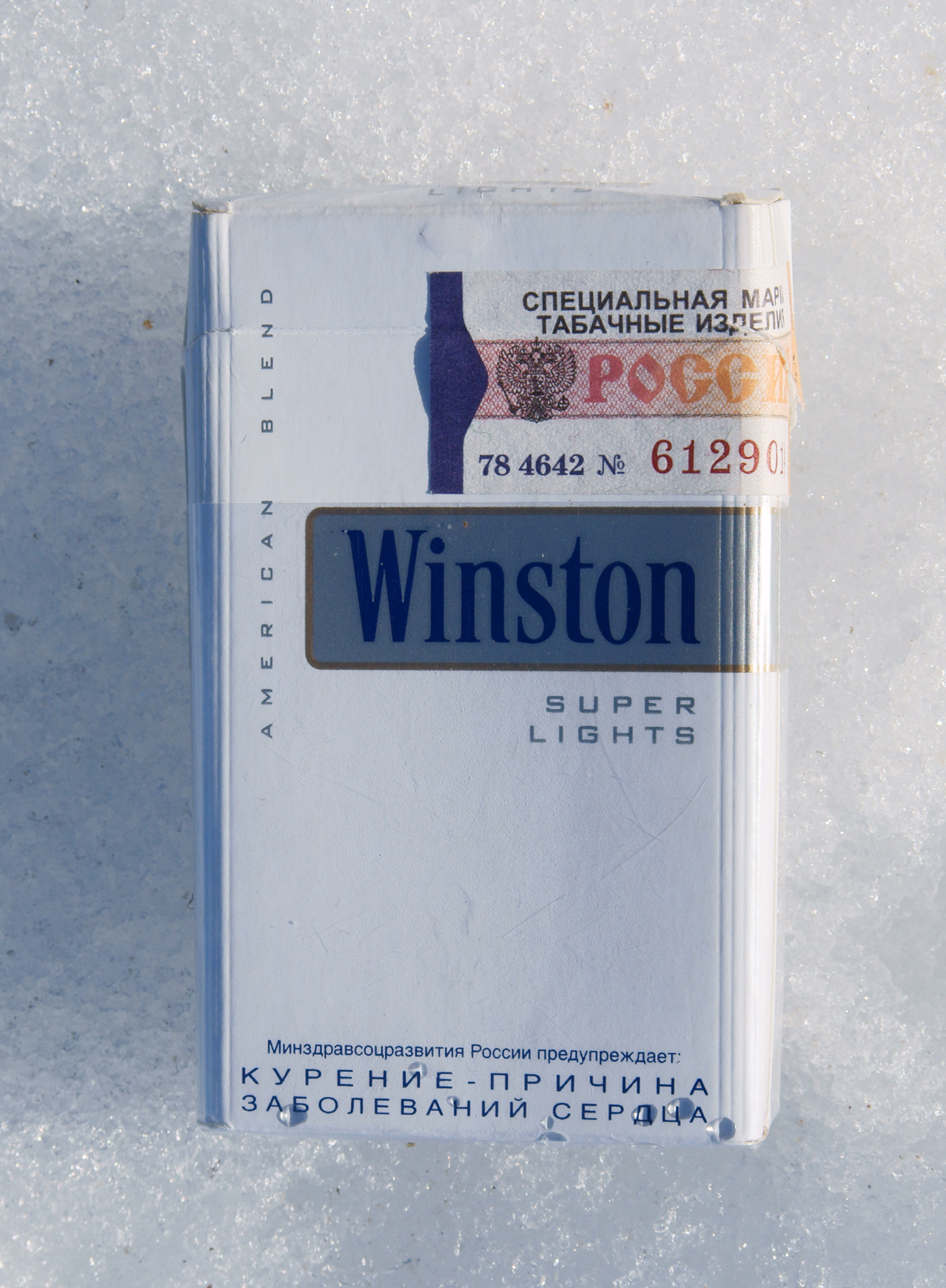
Winston Super Lights with Russian revenue stamp, 2010

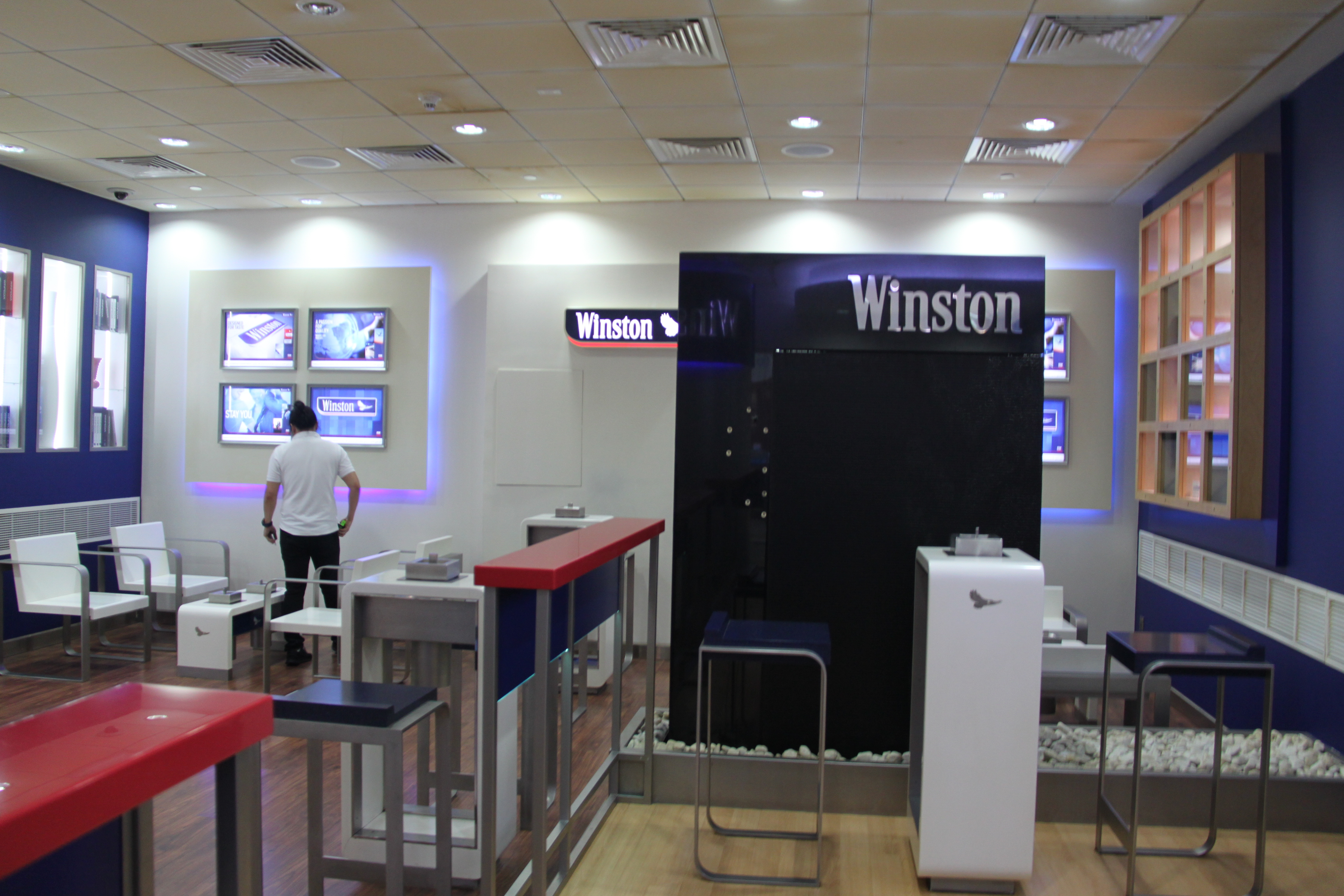
A Winston sponsored smoking room at Dubai International Airport, 2014

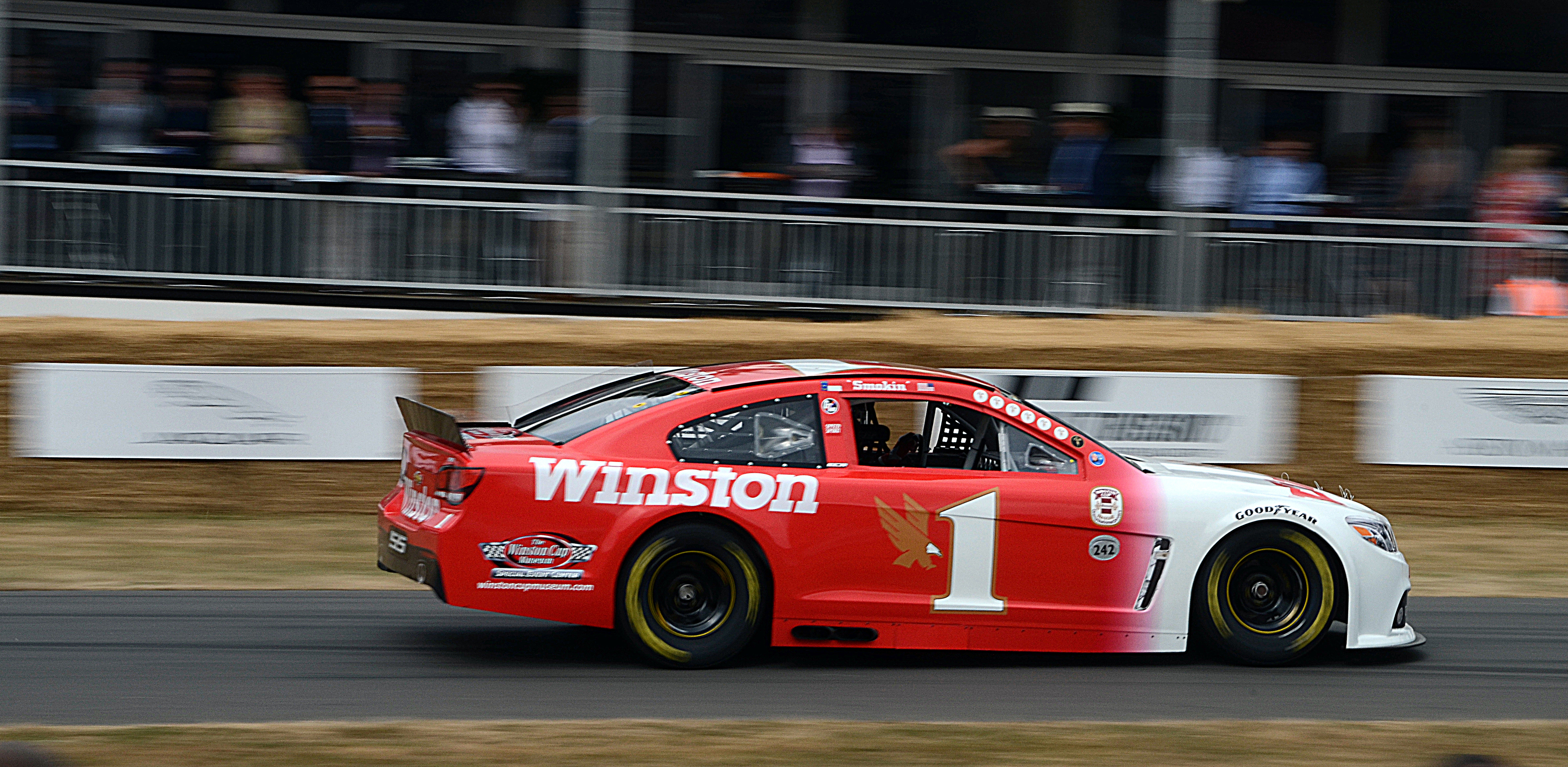
A NASCAR auto with Winston branding during a legacy event, 2018

== See also ==
- NASCAR All-Star Race, known as "The Winston" from 1985 to 2003
- NASCAR Winston Cup Series era, including the Winston Cup Museum lawsuit
- Winston 500 (disambiguation), held at Talladega Superspeedway
- Winston Million, a bonus offered to NASCAR drivers from 1985 to 1997
- Winston No Bull 5, a bonus program that succeeded the Winston Million
