= David Goerlitz =

American model and advocate (born 1950)

- Born: April 15, 1950 (age 76)
- Occupations: Actor, writer, model, educator, and advocate
- Known for: Appearing in advertising as "Winston Man"

David Goerlitz (born April 15, 1950) is an American actor, writer, educator and a male model. He is best known as the "Winston Man", appearing in advertising for Winston cigarettes for eight years in the 1980s.

Goerlitz publicly quit smoking and joined the anti-smoking movement condemning tobacco industry advertising, for which he testified to Congress in 1989. After 20 years of international public speaking and education, Goerlitz became disillusioned with the anti-smoking movement in 2007. He then became an advocate for the vaping industry and in 2016 starred in the documentary film A Billion Lives.

== Biography ==
Goerlitz was the youngest of three boys; his father was a Baptist preacher. Goerlitz stated in a 2016 article "we moved 14 times in 6 years and every state we went to was different". He started smoking at the age of 13 and continued until the age of 38, although he struggled for many years to give up completely. Goerlitz married at the age of 20.

=== Modelling ===
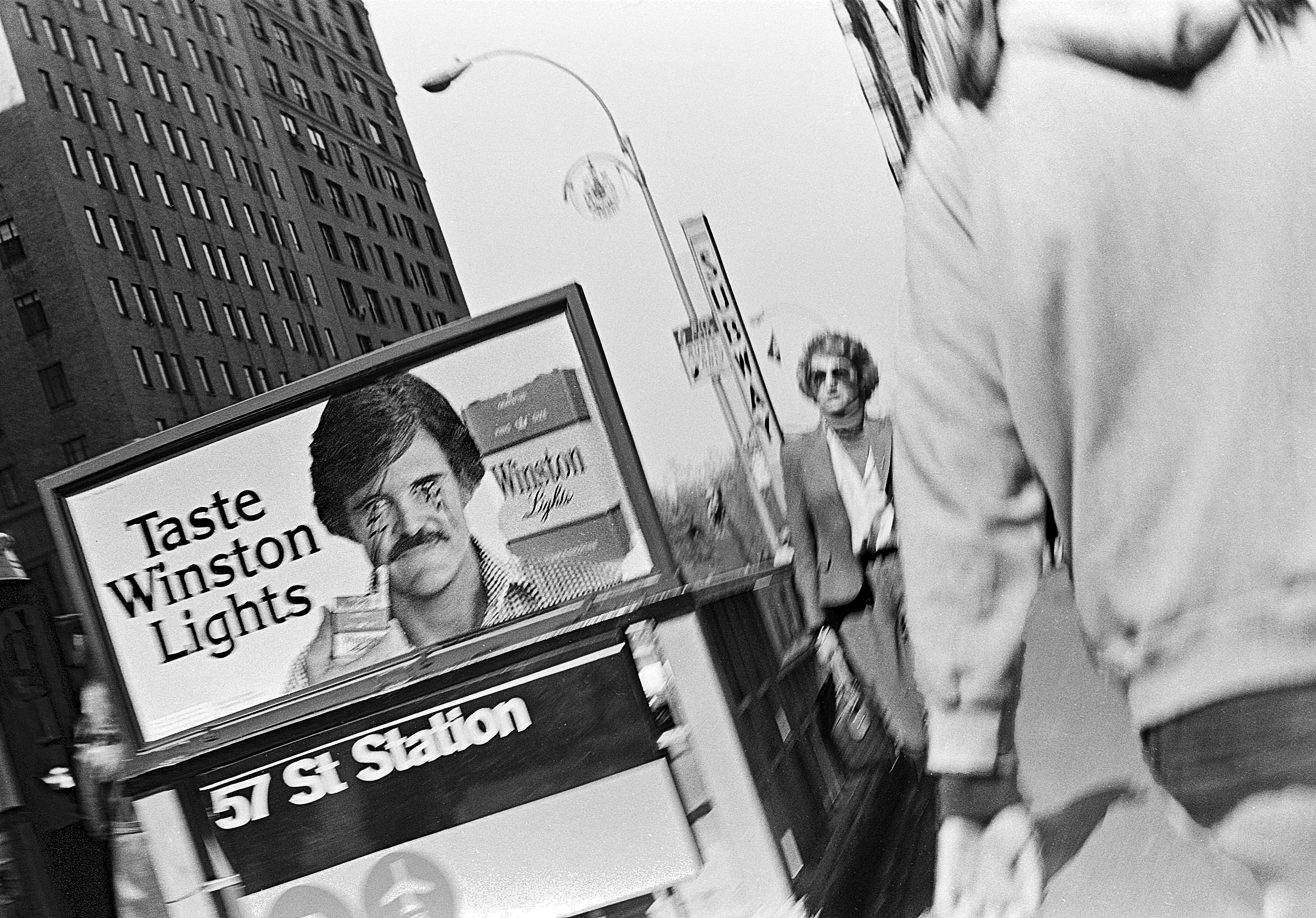
A Winston Man advert (defaced) in Manhattan in 1979

Goerlitz began modelling at the age of 29 and after a callback in 1980 was employed by R.J. Reynold's Tobacco Company as the "Winston Man". Goerlitz was featured in 42 advertisements for Winston cigarettes, including the "Search and Rescue" advertisement series, for which he was America's most-photographed person on cigarette advertisements. The marketing series moved Winston cigarettes from number four to number two in worldwide sales.

=== Public health education ===
In 1988, Goerlitz's brother was diagnosed with cancer, after which Goerlitz publicly quit smoking at the Great American Smokeout in November of that year. At this point he became involved with the anti-smoking movement and toured schools and colleges worldwide. He shared his story throughout North America, Taiwan, Japan and Sweden.

Goerlitz was honoured by the World Health Organisation in 1989 with a medal of honour and also worked with the American Cancer Society, American Lung Association, and American Heart Association.

=== In media ===
In 1999, Goerlitz published his story with Gary LaForest in a book titled Before The Smokescreen with Gladstone Publishing. The book recounts how and why Goerlitz began his 23 year long three and a half pack a day addiction to tobacco. In addition he gives the reader a behind the scenes look at how his ads for the tobacco industry were made and reviews his award-winning educational program for young people.

In 2016, Goerlitz was featured in the award-winning documentary film A Billion Lives, directed and narrated by Aaron Biebert and distributed by the production company Attention Era Media. In the film, Goerlitz discusses his previous role in fighting the tobacco industry and his efforts in the vaping community.

=== Other activities ===
Goerlitz became disillusioned with the anti-smoking movement and controversially spoke out about his views on the anti-smoking industry, government and the tobacco industry. He has been publicly advocating for tobacco harm reduction through the use of vaping products in media since 2007, giving interviews on a number of online platforms.

== See also ==
- Alan Landers, another male model who appeared as "Winston Man"
