= Wisconsin's 26th Senate district =

American legislative district in Dane County, Wisconsin

Wisconsin's 26th State Senate district
- 2024 map defined in 2023 Wisc. Act 94; 2022 map defined in Johnson v. Wisconsin Elections Commission; 2011 map was defined in 2011 Wisc. Act 43 composed of Assembly districts 76, 77, and 78
Senator
Kelda Roys; D–Madison
since January 4, 2021 (5 years, 74 days)
- Demographics: 73.84% White; 7.49% Black; 7.27% Hispanic; 8.27% Asian; 1.29% Native American; 0.09% Hawaiian/Pacific Islander
- Population (2020) • Voting age: 178,964; 151,576
- Website: Official website
- Notes: Madison, Wisconsin

The 26th Senate district of Wisconsin is one of 33 districts in the Wisconsin Senate. Located in south-central Wisconsin, the district comprises Downtown Madison, Wisconsin as well as most of the city's near west, south, east and north sides. The 26th also includes the suburban city of Monona, the villages of Maple Bluff and Shorewood Hills, most of the village of McFarland, and the northeast part of the city of Fitchburg in central Dane County. The district contains landmarks such as the Wisconsin State Capitol, the University of Wisconsin–Madison campus, the University of Wisconsin Arboretum, historic Forest Hill Cemetery, Edgewood University, Monona Terrace, Camp Randall Stadium, and the Kohl Center.

== Current elected officials ==
Kelda Roys is the senator representing the 26th district. She was first elected in the 2020 general election. Before serving as a senator, she was a member of the Wisconsin State Assembly from 2009 to 2013.

Each Wisconsin State Senate district is composed of three Wisconsin State Assembly districts. The 26th Senate district comprises the 76th, 77th, and 78th Assembly districts. The current representatives of those districts are:

- Assembly District 76: Francesca Hong (D–Madison)
- Assembly District 77: Renuka Mayadev (D–Madison)
- Assembly District 78: Shelia Stubbs (D–Madison)

The district is located entirely within Wisconsin's 2nd congressional district, which is represented by U.S. Representative Mark Pocan.

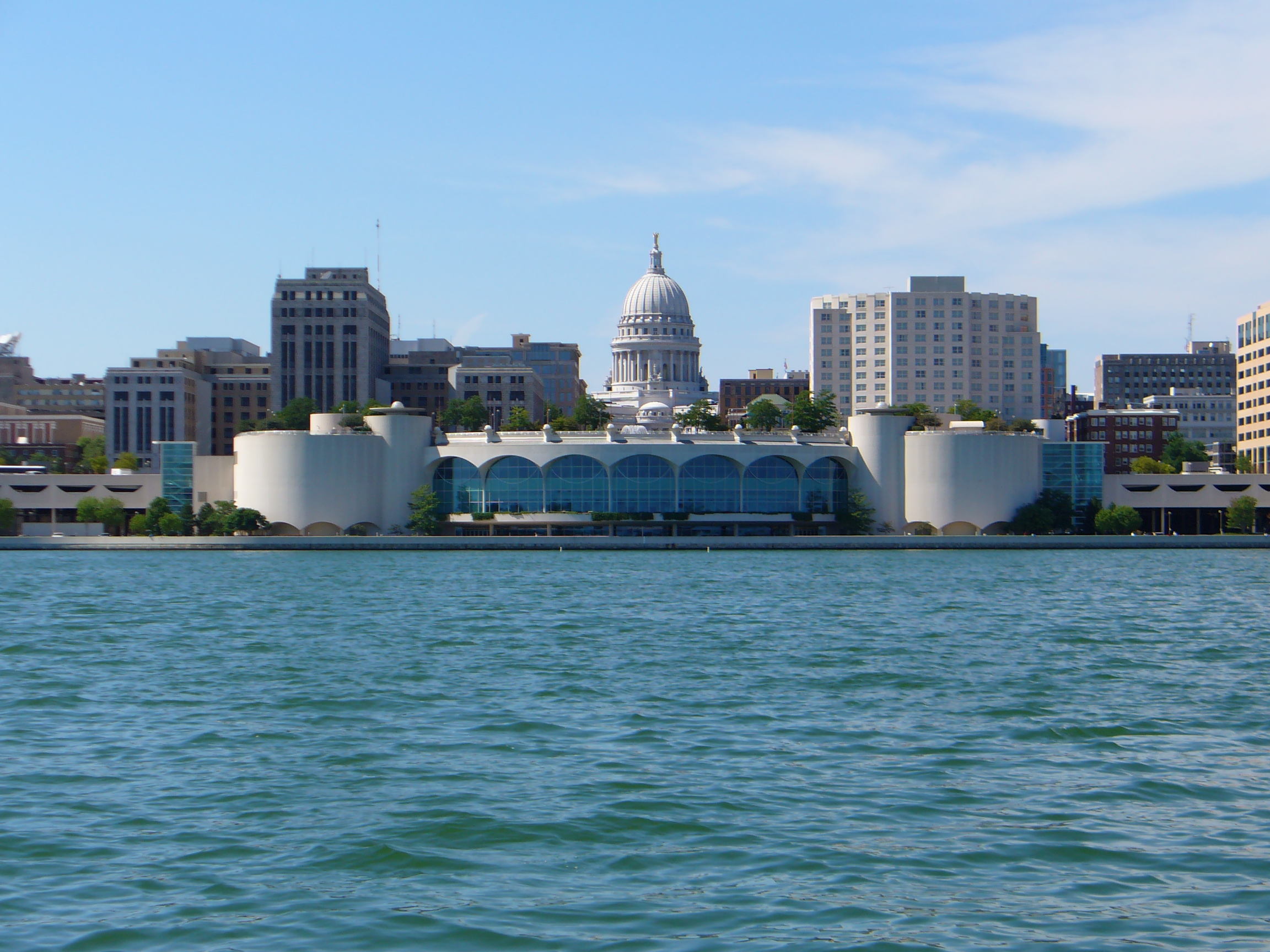
Wisconsin State Capitol viewed over Monona Terrace from Lake Monona

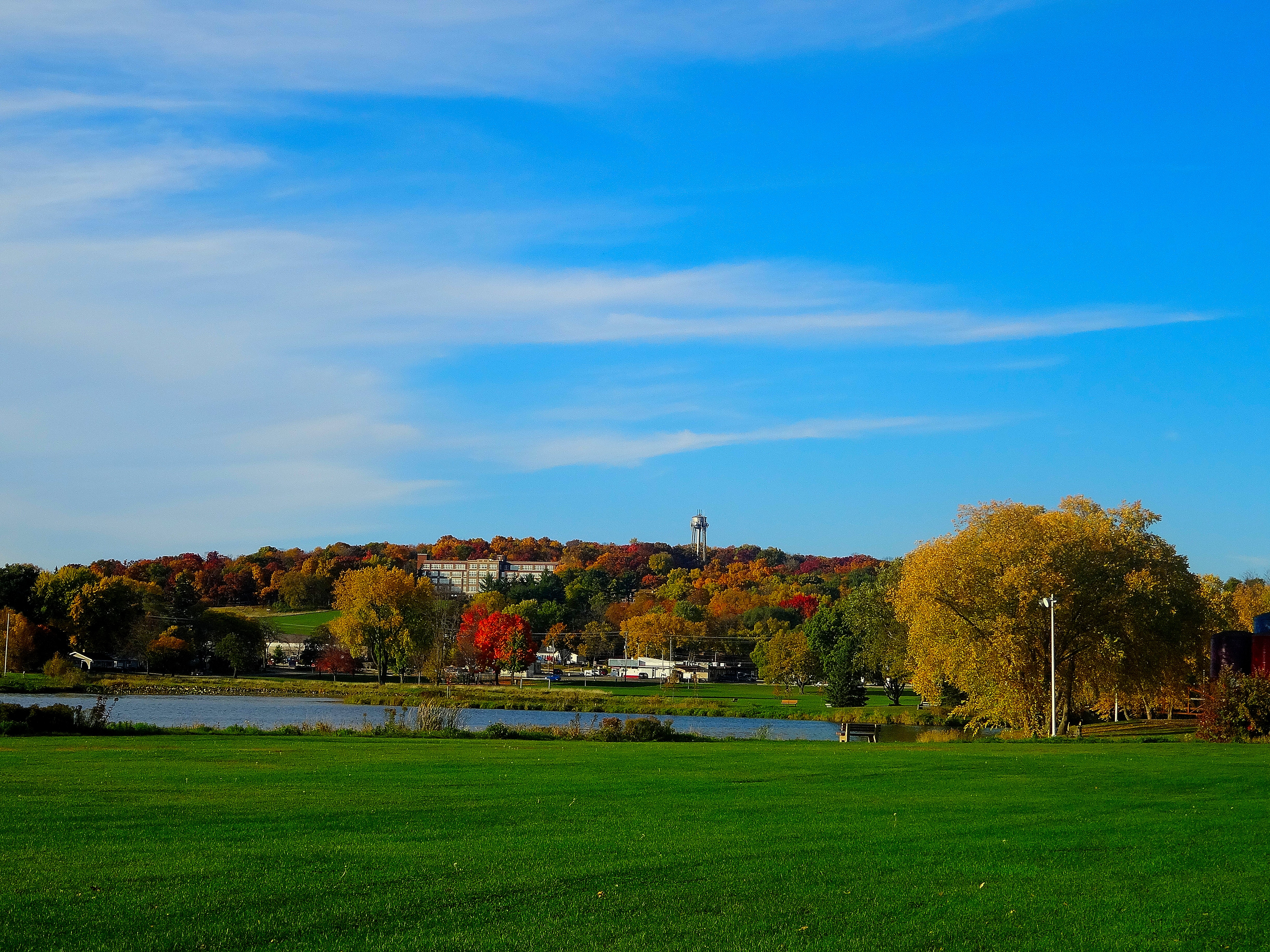
Warner Park

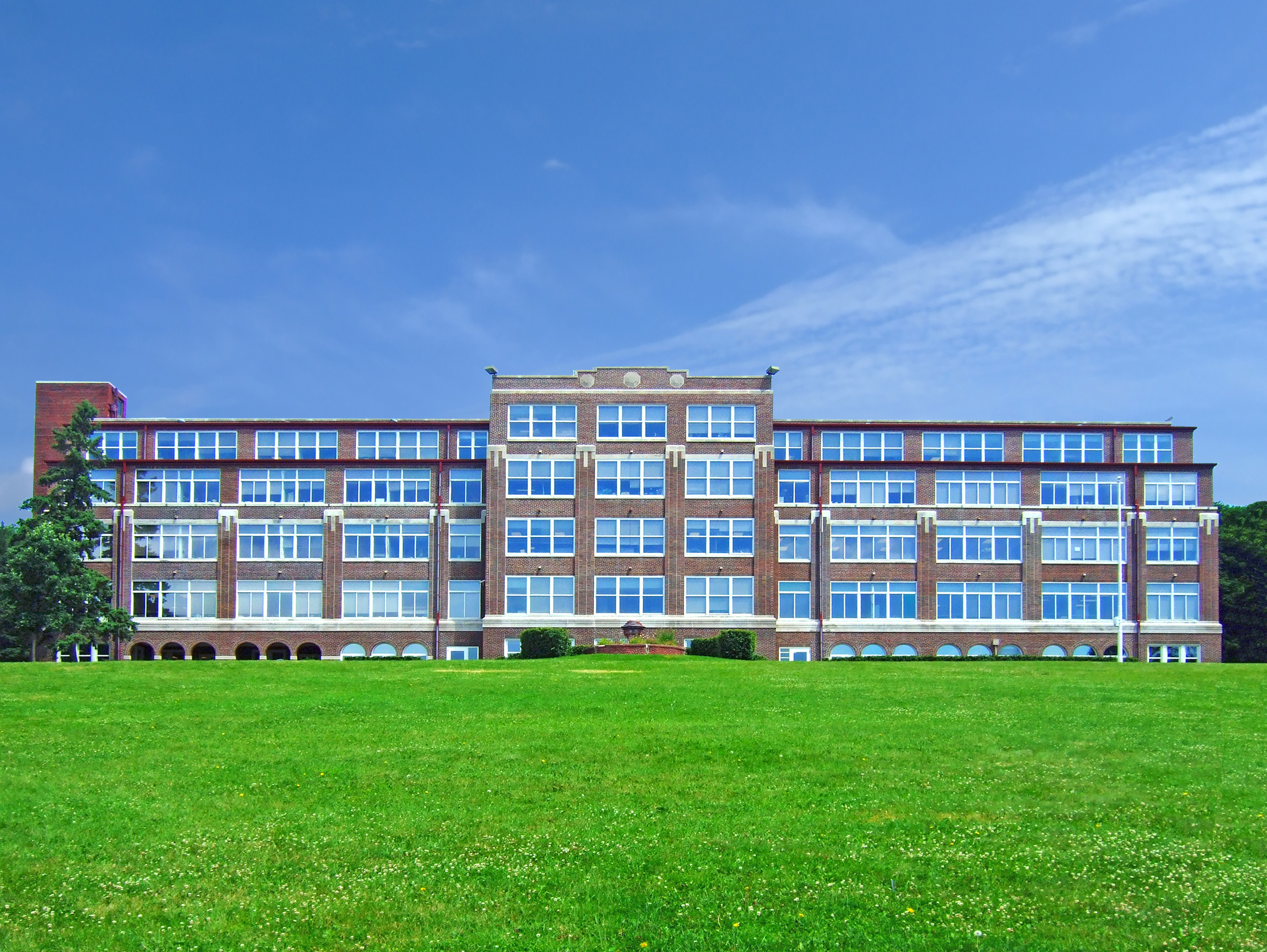
Lake View Sanatorium

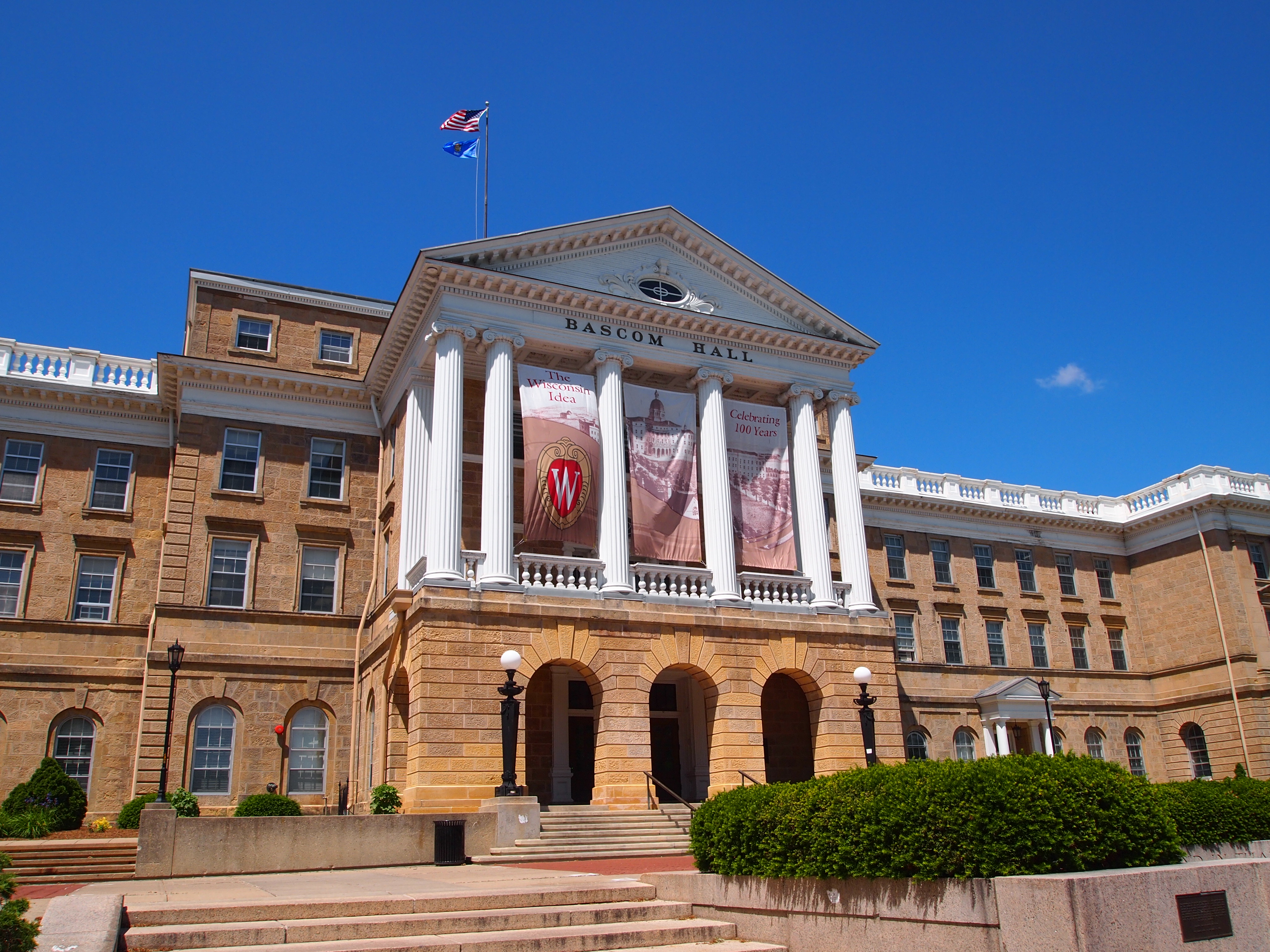
Bascom Hall on Bascom Hill, on the University of Wisconsin–Madison campus

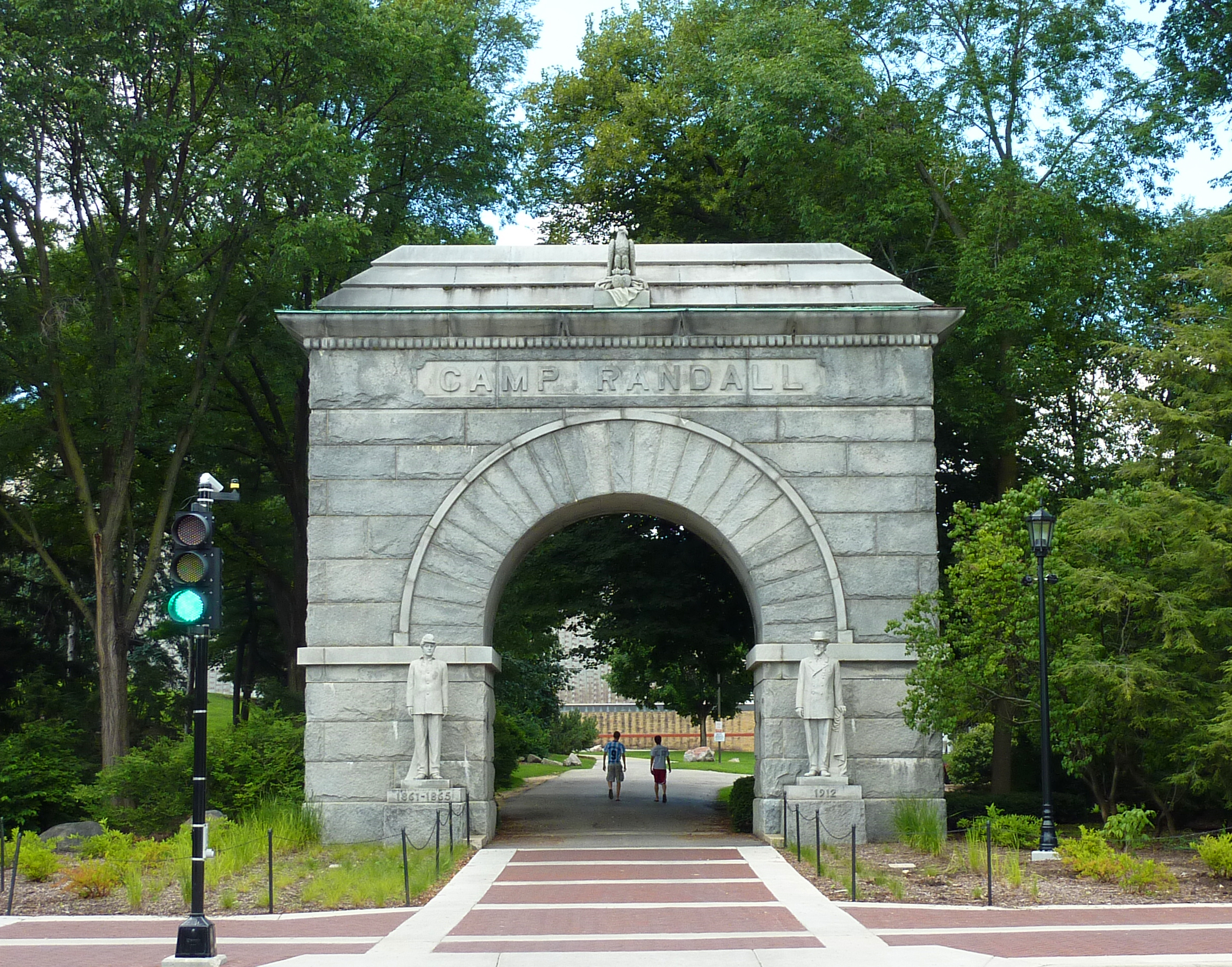
Camp Randall arch

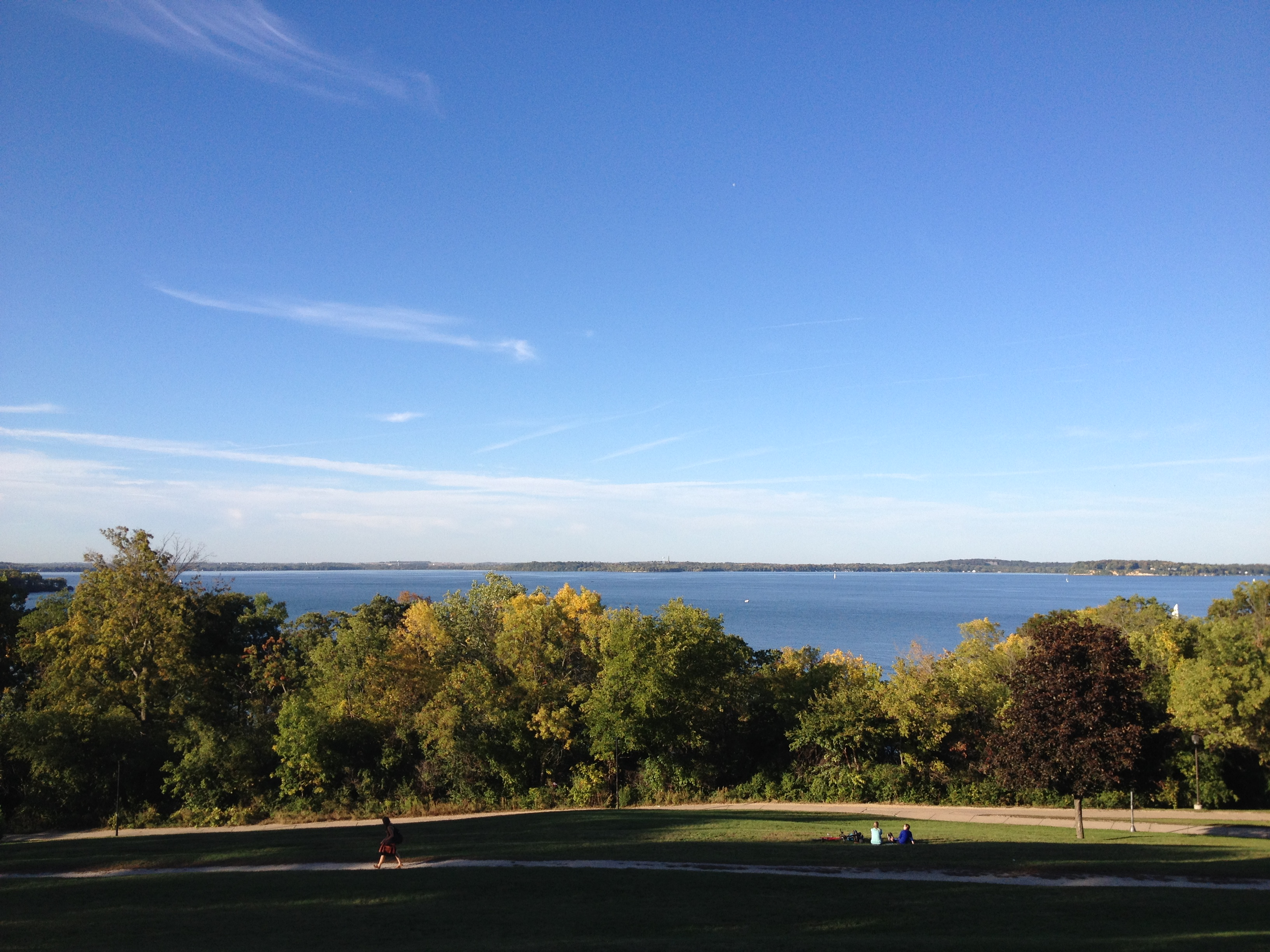
Lake Mendota viewed from Observatory Drive

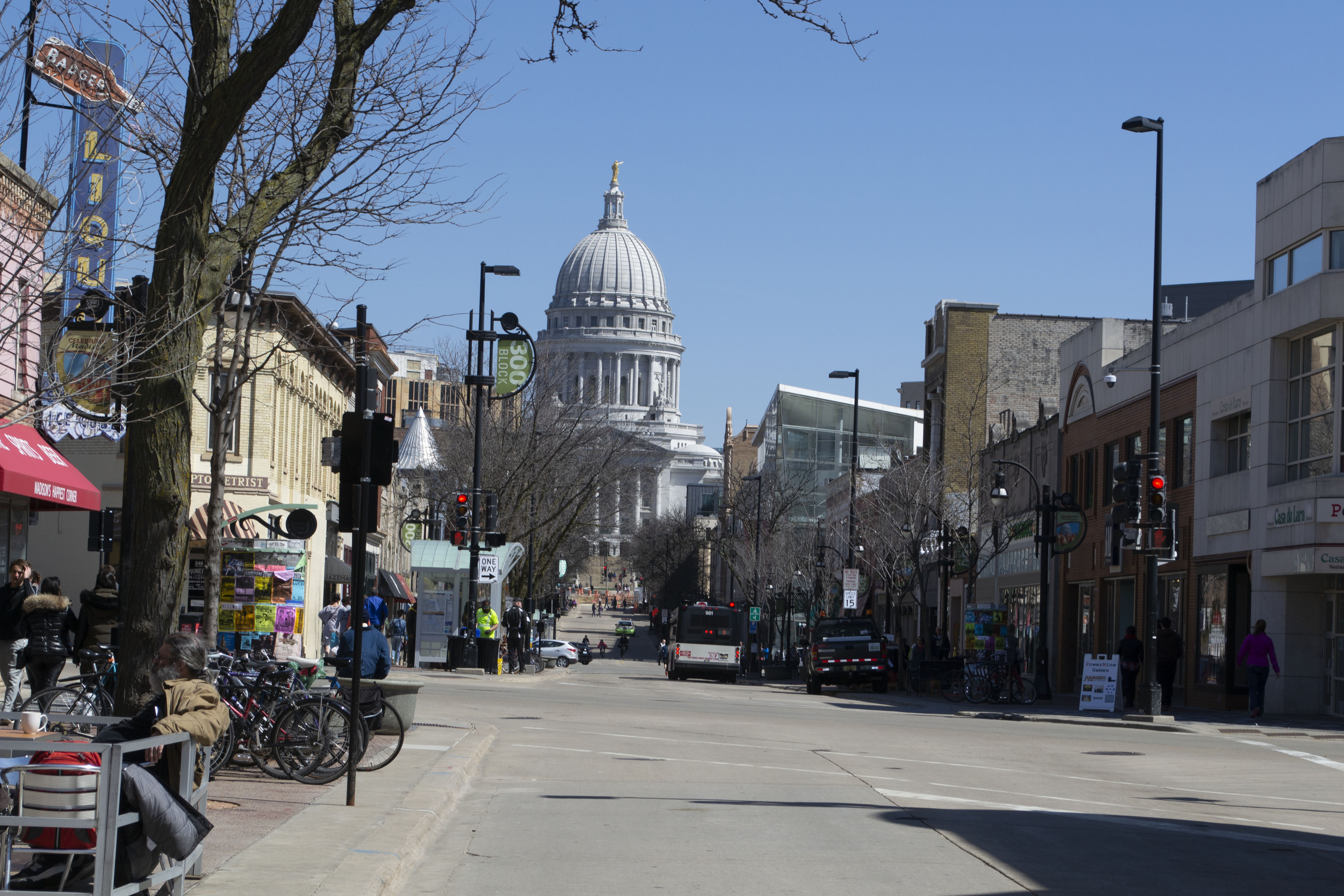
Wisconsin State Capitol viewed from State Street

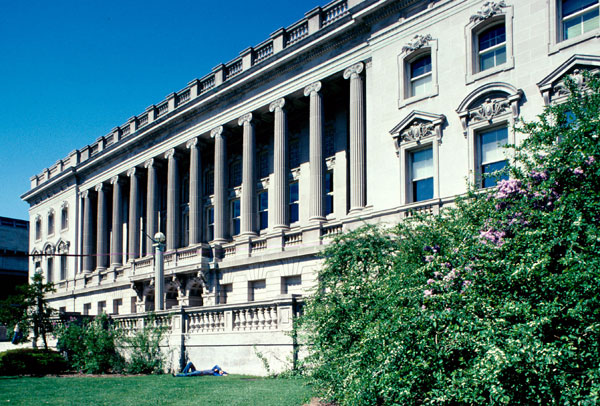
Wisconsin Historical Society

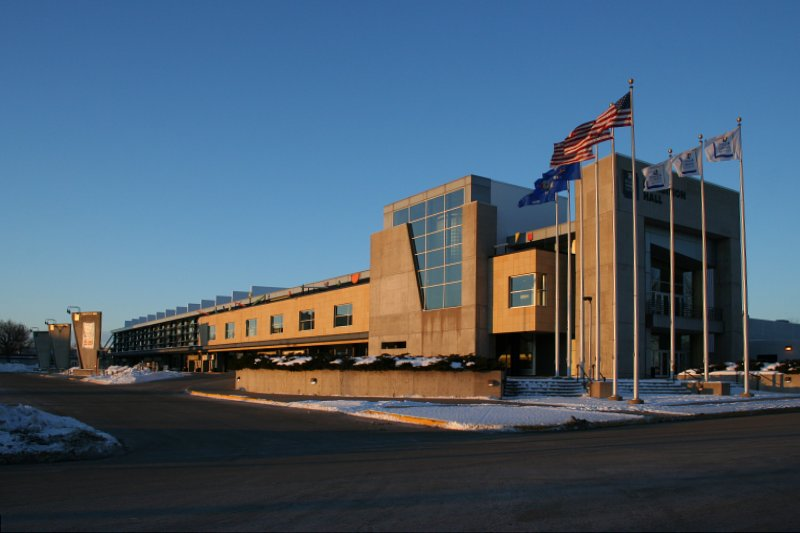
Exhibition Hall at the Alliant Energy Center

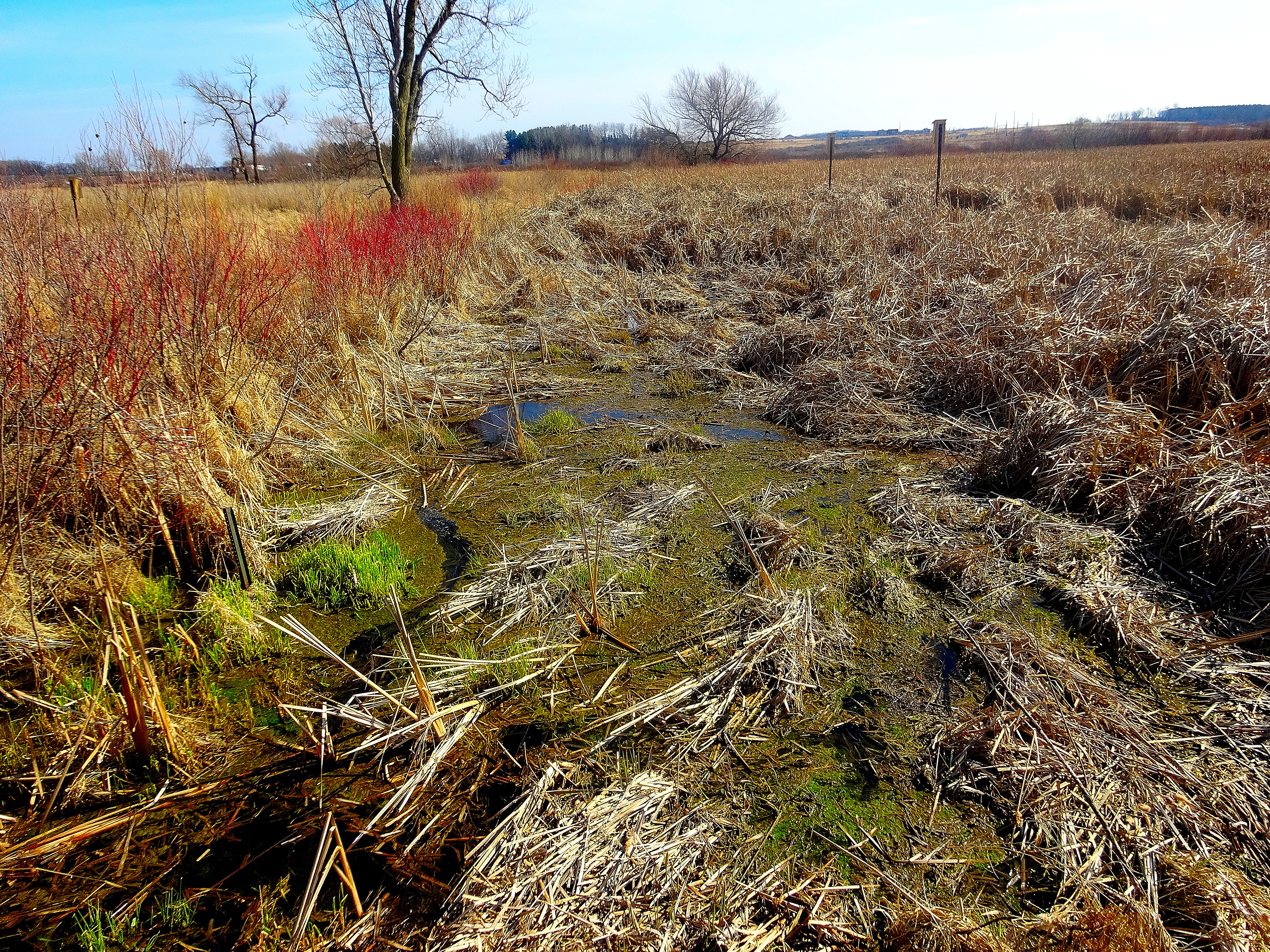
Capital Springs State Recreation Area

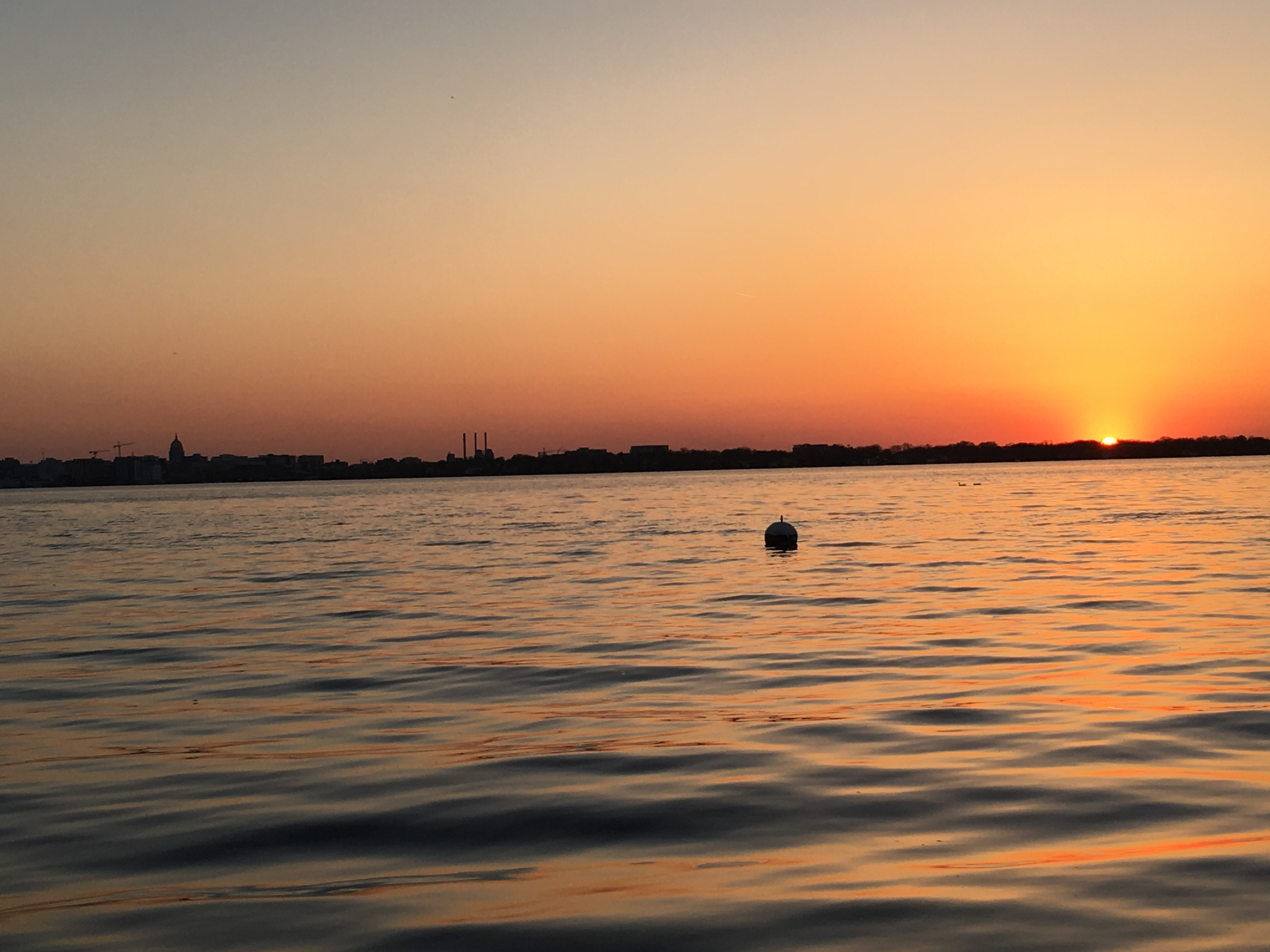
Sunset over Lake Monona

== Past senators ==
Previous senators include:

Note: the boundaries of districts have changed repeatedly over history. Previous politicians of a specific numbered district have represented a completely different geographic area, due to redistricting.

Senator	Party	Notes	Session	Years	District Definition
District created by 1856 Wisc. Act 109.				1856	Western Dane County
Hiram C. Bull	Rep.		10th	1857	Western Dane County
Andrew Proudfit	Dem.		11th	1858	Western Dane County
Andrew Proudfit	Dem.		12th	1859	Western Dane County
John B. Sweat	Dem.		13th	1860	Western Dane County
John B. Sweat	Dem.		14th	1861	Western Dane County
Benjamin F. Hopkins	Rep.		15th	1862	Western Dane County: Town of Berry; Town of Black Earth; Town of Blue Mounds; Town of Dane; Town of Fitchburg; Town of Madison; Town of Mazomanie; Town of Montrose; Town of Oregon; Town of Perry; Town of Primrose; Town of Roxbury; Town of Springdale; Town of Verona; City of Madison
Benjamin F. Hopkins	Rep.		16th	1863	Western Dane County: Town of Berry; Town of Black Earth; Town of Blue Mounds; Town of Dane; Town of Fitchburg; Town of Madison; Town of Mazomanie; Town of Montrose; Town of Oregon; Town of Perry; Town of Primrose; Town of Roxbury; Town of Springdale; Town of Verona; City of Madison
Thomas Hood	Natl. Union		17th	1864	Western Dane County: Town of Berry; Town of Black Earth; Town of Blue Mounds; Town of Dane; Town of Fitchburg; Town of Madison; Town of Mazomanie; Town of Montrose; Town of Oregon; Town of Perry; Town of Primrose; Town of Roxbury; Town of Springdale; Town of Verona; City of Madison
Thomas Hood	Natl. Union		18th	1865	Western Dane County: Town of Berry; Town of Black Earth; Town of Blue Mounds; Town of Dane; Town of Fitchburg; Town of Madison; Town of Mazomanie; Town of Montrose; Town of Oregon; Town of Perry; Town of Primrose; Town of Roxbury; Town of Springdale; Town of Verona; City of Madison
James K. Proudfit	Natl. Union		19th	1866	Western Dane County: Town of Berry; Town of Black Earth; Town of Blue Mounds; Town of Dane; Town of Fitchburg; Town of Madison; Town of Mazomanie; Town of Montrose; Town of Oregon; Town of Perry; Town of Primrose; Town of Roxbury; Town of Springdale; Town of Verona; City of Madison
James K. Proudfit	Natl. Union		20th	1867	Western Dane County: Town of Berry; Town of Black Earth; Town of Blue Mounds; Town of Cross Plains; Town of Dane; Town of Fitchburg; Town of Madison; Town of Mazomanie; Town of Middleton; Town of Montrose; Town of Oregon; Town of Perry; Town of Primrose; Town of Roxbury; Town of Springdale; Town of Springfield; Town of Vermont; Town of Verona; City of Madison
Carl Habich	Dem.		21st	1868	Western Dane County: Town of Berry; Town of Black Earth; Town of Blue Mounds; Town of Cross Plains; Town of Dane; Town of Fitchburg; Town of Madison; Town of Mazomanie; Town of Middleton; Town of Montrose; Town of Oregon; Town of Perry; Town of Primrose; Town of Roxbury; Town of Springdale; Town of Springfield; Town of Vermont; Town of Verona; City of Madison
Carl Habich	Dem.		22nd	1869	Western Dane County: Town of Berry; Town of Black Earth; Town of Blue Mounds; Town of Cross Plains; Town of Dane; Town of Fitchburg; Town of Madison; Town of Mazomanie; Town of Middleton; Town of Montrose; Town of Oregon; Town of Perry; Town of Primrose; Town of Roxbury; Town of Springdale; Town of Springfield; Town of Vermont; Town of Verona; City of Madison
Romanzo E. Davis	Rep.		23rd	1870	Western Dane County: Town of Berry; Town of Black Earth; Town of Blue Mounds; Town of Cross Plains; Town of Dane; Town of Fitchburg; Town of Madison; Town of Mazomanie; Town of Middleton; Town of Montrose; Town of Oregon; Town of Perry; Town of Primrose; Town of Roxbury; Town of Springdale; Town of Springfield; Town of Vermont; Town of Verona; City of Madison
Romanzo E. Davis	Rep.		24th	1871	Western Dane County: Town of Berry; Town of Black Earth; Town of Blue Mounds; Town of Cross Plains; Town of Dane; Town of Fitchburg; Town of Madison; Town of Mazomanie; Town of Middleton; Town of Montrose; Town of Oregon; Town of Perry; Town of Primrose; Town of Roxbury; Town of Springdale; Town of Springfield; Town of Vermont; Town of Verona; City of Madison
Romanzo E. Davis	Rep.		25th	1872	Western Dane County: Town of Berry; Town of Black Earth; Town of Blue Mounds; Town of Cross Plains; Town of Dane; Town of Fitchburg; Town of Madison; Town of Mazomanie; Town of Middleton; Town of Montrose; Town of Oregon; Town of Perry; Town of Primrose; Town of Roxbury; Town of Rutland; Town of Springdale; Town of Springfield; Town of Vermont; Town of Verona; Town of Vienna; Town of Westport; 1870 population: 26,154
Romanzo E. Davis	Rep.		26th	1873	Western Dane County: Town of Berry; Town of Black Earth; Town of Blue Mounds; Town of Cross Plains; Town of Dane; Town of Fitchburg; Town of Madison; Town of Mazomanie; Town of Middleton; Town of Montrose; Town of Oregon; Town of Perry; Town of Primrose; Town of Roxbury; Town of Rutland; Town of Springdale; Town of Springfield; Town of Vermont; Town of Verona; Town of Vienna; Town of Westport; 1870 population: 26,154
Romanzo E. Davis	Lib. Rep.		27th	1874	Western Dane County: Town of Berry; Town of Black Earth; Town of Blue Mounds; Town of Cross Plains; Town of Dane; Town of Fitchburg; Town of Madison; Town of Mazomanie; Town of Middleton; Town of Montrose; Town of Oregon; Town of Perry; Town of Primrose; Town of Roxbury; Town of Rutland; Town of Springdale; Town of Springfield; Town of Vermont; Town of Verona; Town of Vienna; Town of Westport; 1870 population: 26,154
Romanzo E. Davis	Lib. Rep.		28th	1875	Western Dane County: Town of Berry; Town of Black Earth; Town of Blue Mounds; Town of Cross Plains; Town of Dane; Town of Fitchburg; Town of Madison; Town of Mazomanie; Town of Middleton; Town of Montrose; Town of Oregon; Town of Perry; Town of Primrose; Town of Roxbury; Town of Rutland; Town of Springdale; Town of Springfield; Town of Vermont; Town of Verona; Town of Vienna; Town of Westport; 1870 population: 26,154
Romanzo E. Davis	Reform		29th	1876	Western Dane County: Town of Berry; Town of Black Earth; Town of Blue Mounds; Town of Cross Plains; Town of Dane; Town of Fitchburg; Town of Madison; Town of Mazomanie; Town of Middleton; Town of Montrose; Town of Oregon; Town of Perry; Town of Primrose; Town of Roxbury; Town of Rutland; Town of Springdale; Town of Springfield; Town of Vermont; Town of Verona; Town of Vienna; Town of Westport; 1870 population: 26,154
Romanzo E. Davis	Reform		30th	1877	Western Dane County: Town of Berry; Town of Black Earth; Town of Blue Mounds; Town of Cross Plains; Town of Dane; Town of Fitchburg; Town of Mazomanie; Town of Middleton; Town of Montrose; Town of Perry; Town of Primrose; Town of Roxbury; Town of Springdale; Town of Springfield; Town of Vermont; Town of Verona; Town of Westport; 1875 population: 20,435
Matthew Anderson	Dem.		31st	1878	Western Dane County: Town of Berry; Town of Black Earth; Town of Blue Mounds; Town of Cross Plains; Town of Dane; Town of Fitchburg; Town of Mazomanie; Town of Middleton; Town of Montrose; Town of Perry; Town of Primrose; Town of Roxbury; Town of Springdale; Town of Springfield; Town of Vermont; Town of Verona; Town of Westport; 1875 population: 20,435
Matthew Anderson	Dem.		32nd	1879	Western Dane County: Town of Berry; Town of Black Earth; Town of Blue Mounds; Town of Cross Plains; Town of Dane; Town of Fitchburg; Town of Mazomanie; Town of Middleton; Town of Montrose; Town of Perry; Town of Primrose; Town of Roxbury; Town of Springdale; Town of Springfield; Town of Vermont; Town of Verona; Town of Westport; 1875 population: 20,435
Matthew Anderson	Dem.		33rd	1880	Western Dane County: Town of Berry; Town of Black Earth; Town of Blue Mounds; Town of Cross Plains; Town of Dane; Town of Fitchburg; Town of Mazomanie; Town of Middleton; Town of Montrose; Town of Perry; Town of Primrose; Town of Roxbury; Town of Springdale; Town of Springfield; Town of Vermont; Town of Verona; Town of Westport; 1875 population: 20,435
Matthew Anderson	Dem.		34th	1881	Western Dane County: Town of Berry; Town of Black Earth; Town of Blue Mounds; Town of Cross Plains; Town of Dane; Town of Fitchburg; Town of Mazomanie; Town of Middleton; Town of Montrose; Town of Perry; Town of Primrose; Town of Roxbury; Town of Springdale; Town of Springfield; Town of Vermont; Town of Verona; Town of Westport; 1875 population: 20,435
John Adams	Dem.		35th	1882	Western Dane County: Town of Berry; Town of Black Earth; Town of Blue Mounds; Town of Cross Plains; Town of Dane; Town of Fitchburg; Town of Mazomanie; Town of Middleton; Town of Montrose; Town of Perry; Town of Primrose; Town of Roxbury; Town of Springdale; Town of Springfield; Town of Vermont; Town of Verona; Town of Westport; 1875 population: 20,435
John Adams	Dem.		36th	1883–1884	Dane County; 1880 population: 53,234; 1885 population: 58,400
James Conklin	Dem.		37th	1885–1886	Dane County; 1880 population: 53,234; 1885 population: 58,400
James Conklin	Dem.		38th	1887–1888	Dane County; 1880 population: 53,234; 1885 population: 58,400
Willett Main	Rep.		39th	1889–1890	Dane County; 1880 population: 53,234; 1885 population: 58,400
Willett Main	Rep.		40th	1891–1892	Dane County; 1880 population: 53,234; 1885 population: 58,400
Robert McKee Bashford	Dem.		41st	1893–1894	Most of Dane County; 1890 population: 45,093
Robert McKee Bashford	Dem.		42nd	1895–1896	Most of Dane County; 1890 population: 45,093
Chauncey B. Welton	Rep.		43rd	1897–1898	WI Senate District 26, 1896-1954 Dane County; 1895 population: 65,669; 1900 population: 69,435; 1910 population: 77,435
Chauncey B. Welton	Rep.		44th	1899–1900	WI Senate District 26, 1896-1954 Dane County; 1895 population: 65,669; 1900 population: 69,435; 1910 population: 77,435
George P. Miller	Rep.		45th	1901–1902	WI Senate District 26, 1896-1954 Dane County; 1895 population: 65,669; 1900 population: 69,435; 1910 population: 77,435
George P. Miller	Rep.		46th	1903–1904	WI Senate District 26, 1896-1954 Dane County; 1895 population: 65,669; 1900 population: 69,435; 1910 population: 77,435
Albert M. Stondall	Rep.		47th	1905–1906	WI Senate District 26, 1896-1954 Dane County; 1895 population: 65,669; 1900 population: 69,435; 1910 population: 77,435
Albert M. Stondall	Rep.		48th	1907–1908	WI Senate District 26, 1896-1954 Dane County; 1895 population: 65,669; 1900 population: 69,435; 1910 population: 77,435
John S. Donald	Rep.		49th	1909–1910	WI Senate District 26, 1896-1954 Dane County; 1895 population: 65,669; 1900 population: 69,435; 1910 population: 77,435
John S. Donald	Rep.		50th	1911–1912	WI Senate District 26, 1896-1954 Dane County; 1895 population: 65,669; 1900 population: 69,435; 1910 population: 77,435
Henry Huber	Rep.		51st	1913–1914	WI Senate District 26, 1896-1954 Dane County; 1895 population: 65,669; 1900 population: 69,435; 1910 population: 77,435
Henry Huber	Rep.		52nd	1915–1916	WI Senate District 26, 1896-1954 Dane County; 1895 population: 65,669; 1900 population: 69,435; 1910 population: 77,435
Henry Huber	Rep.		53rd	1917–1918	WI Senate District 26, 1896-1954 Dane County; 1895 population: 65,669; 1900 population: 69,435; 1910 population: 77,435
Henry Huber	Rep.		54th	1919–1920	WI Senate District 26, 1896-1954 Dane County; 1895 population: 65,669; 1900 population: 69,435; 1910 population: 77,435
Henry Huber	Rep.		55th	1921–1922	WI Senate District 26, 1896-1954 Dane County; 1895 population: 65,669; 1900 population: 69,435; 1910 population: 77,435
Henry Huber	Rep.		56th	1923–1924	WI Senate District 26, 1896-1954 Dane County; 1895 population: 65,669; 1900 population: 69,435; 1910 population: 77,435
Harry Sauthoff	Rep.		57th	1925–1926	WI Senate District 26, 1896-1954 Dane County; 1895 population: 65,669; 1900 population: 69,435; 1910 population: 77,435
Harry Sauthoff	Rep.		58th	1927–1928	WI Senate District 26, 1896-1954 Dane County; 1895 population: 65,669; 1900 population: 69,435; 1910 population: 77,435
Glenn D. Roberts	Rep.		59th	1929–1930	WI Senate District 26, 1896-1954 Dane County; 1895 population: 65,669; 1900 population: 69,435; 1910 population: 77,435
Glenn D. Roberts	Rep.		60th	1931–1932	WI Senate District 26, 1896-1954 Dane County; 1895 population: 65,669; 1900 population: 69,435; 1910 population: 77,435
Alvin C. Reis	Rep.	Resigned 1934.	61st	1933–1934	WI Senate District 26, 1896-1954 Dane County; 1895 population: 65,669; 1900 population: 69,435; 1910 population: 77,435
Harold Groves	Prog.	Won 1934 special election.	62nd	1935–1936	WI Senate District 26, 1896-1954 Dane County; 1895 population: 65,669; 1900 population: 69,435; 1910 population: 77,435
Fred E. Risser	Prog.		63rd	1937–1938	WI Senate District 26, 1896-1954 Dane County; 1895 population: 65,669; 1900 population: 69,435; 1910 population: 77,435
Fred E. Risser	Prog.		64th	1939–1940	WI Senate District 26, 1896-1954 Dane County; 1895 population: 65,669; 1900 population: 69,435; 1910 population: 77,435
Fred E. Risser	Prog.		65th	1941–1942	WI Senate District 26, 1896-1954 Dane County; 1895 population: 65,669; 1900 population: 69,435; 1910 population: 77,435
Fred E. Risser	Prog.		66th	1943–1944	WI Senate District 26, 1896-1954 Dane County; 1895 population: 65,669; 1900 population: 69,435; 1910 population: 77,435
Fred E. Risser	Prog.		67th	1945–1946	WI Senate District 26, 1896-1954 Dane County; 1895 population: 65,669; 1900 population: 69,435; 1910 population: 77,435
Fred E. Risser	Prog.		68th	1947–1948	WI Senate District 26, 1896-1954 Dane County; 1895 population: 65,669; 1900 population: 69,435; 1910 population: 77,435
Gaylord Nelson	Dem.		69th	1949–1950	WI Senate District 26, 1896-1954 Dane County; 1895 population: 65,669; 1900 population: 69,435; 1910 population: 77,435
Gaylord Nelson	Dem.		70th	1951–1952	WI Senate District 26, 1896-1954 Dane County; 1895 population: 65,669; 1900 population: 69,435; 1910 population: 77,435
Gaylord Nelson	Dem.		71st	1953–1954	WI Senate District 26, 1896-1954 Dane County; 1895 population: 65,669; 1900 population: 69,435; 1910 population: 77,435
Gaylord Nelson	Dem.		72nd	1955–1956	Part of Dane County
Horace W. Wilkie	Dem.	Resigned June 1962 after appointment to Wisconsin Supreme Court.	73rd	1957–1958	Part of Dane County
Horace W. Wilkie	Dem.	Resigned June 1962 after appointment to Wisconsin Supreme Court.	74th	1959–1960	Part of Dane County
Horace W. Wilkie	Dem.	Resigned June 1962 after appointment to Wisconsin Supreme Court.	75th	1961–1962	Part of Dane County
--Vacant--			75th	1961–1962	Part of Dane County
Fred A. Risser	Dem.	Won 1962 special election.	76th	1963–1964	Part of Dane County
Fred A. Risser	Dem.	Won 1962 special election.	77th	1965–1966	Part of Dane County
Fred A. Risser	Dem.	Won 1962 special election.	78th	1967–1968	Part of Dane County
Fred A. Risser	Dem.	Won 1962 special election.	79th	1969–1970	Part of Dane County
Fred A. Risser	Dem.	Won 1962 special election.	80th	1971–1972	Part of Dane County
Fred A. Risser	Dem.	Won 1962 special election.	81st	1973–1974	Part of Dane County
Fred A. Risser	Dem.	Won 1962 special election.	82nd	1975–1976	Part of Dane County
Fred A. Risser	Dem.	Won 1962 special election.	83rd	1977–1978	Part of Dane County
Fred A. Risser	Dem.	Won 1962 special election.	84th	1979–1980	Part of Dane County
Fred A. Risser	Dem.	Won 1962 special election.	85th	1981–1982	Part of Dane County
Fred A. Risser	Dem.	Won 1962 special election.	86th	1983–1984	Part of Dane County
Fred A. Risser	Dem.	Won 1962 special election.	87th	1985–1986	Part of Dane County
Fred A. Risser	Dem.	Won 1962 special election.	88th	1987–1988	Part of Dane County
Fred A. Risser	Dem.	Won 1962 special election.	89th	1989–1990	Part of Dane County
Fred A. Risser	Dem.	Won 1962 special election.	90th	1991–1992	Part of Dane County
Fred A. Risser	Dem.	Won 1962 special election.	91st	1993–1994	Part of Dane County
Fred A. Risser	Dem.	Won 1962 special election.	92nd	1995–1996	Part of Dane County
Fred A. Risser	Dem.	Won 1962 special election.	93rd	1997–1998	Part of Dane County
Fred A. Risser	Dem.	Won 1962 special election.	94th	1999–2000	Part of Dane County
Fred A. Risser	Dem.	Won 1962 special election.	95th	2001–2002	Part of Dane County
Fred A. Risser	Dem.	Won 1962 special election.	96th	2003–2004	Part of Dane County
Fred A. Risser	Dem.	Won 1962 special election.	97th	2005–2006	Part of Dane County
Fred A. Risser	Dem.	Won 1962 special election.	98th	2007–2008	Part of Dane County
Fred A. Risser	Dem.	Won 1962 special election.	99th	2009–2010	Part of Dane County
Fred A. Risser	Dem.	Won 1962 special election.	100th	2011–2012	Part of Dane County
Fred A. Risser	Dem.	Won 1962 special election.	101st	2013–2014	Central Dane County
Fred A. Risser	Dem.	Won 1962 special election.	102nd	2015–2016	Central Dane County
Fred A. Risser	Dem.	Won 1962 special election.	103rd	2017–2018	Central Dane County
Fred A. Risser	Dem.	Won 1962 special election.	104th	2019–2020	Central Dane County
Kelda Roys	Dem.	Elected 2020. Re-elected 2024.	105th	2021–2022	Central Dane County
Kelda Roys	Dem.	Elected 2020. Re-elected 2024.	106th	2023–2024	Central Dane County
Kelda Roys	Dem.	Elected 2020. Re-elected 2024.	107th	2025–2026	Central Dane County
