= Senator Witter =

Senator Witter may refer to:

- George H. Witter (1854–1913), New York State Senate
- Isaac P. Witter (1873–1942), Wisconsin State Senate
