= John Adams (Wisconsin politician) =

19th century American politician

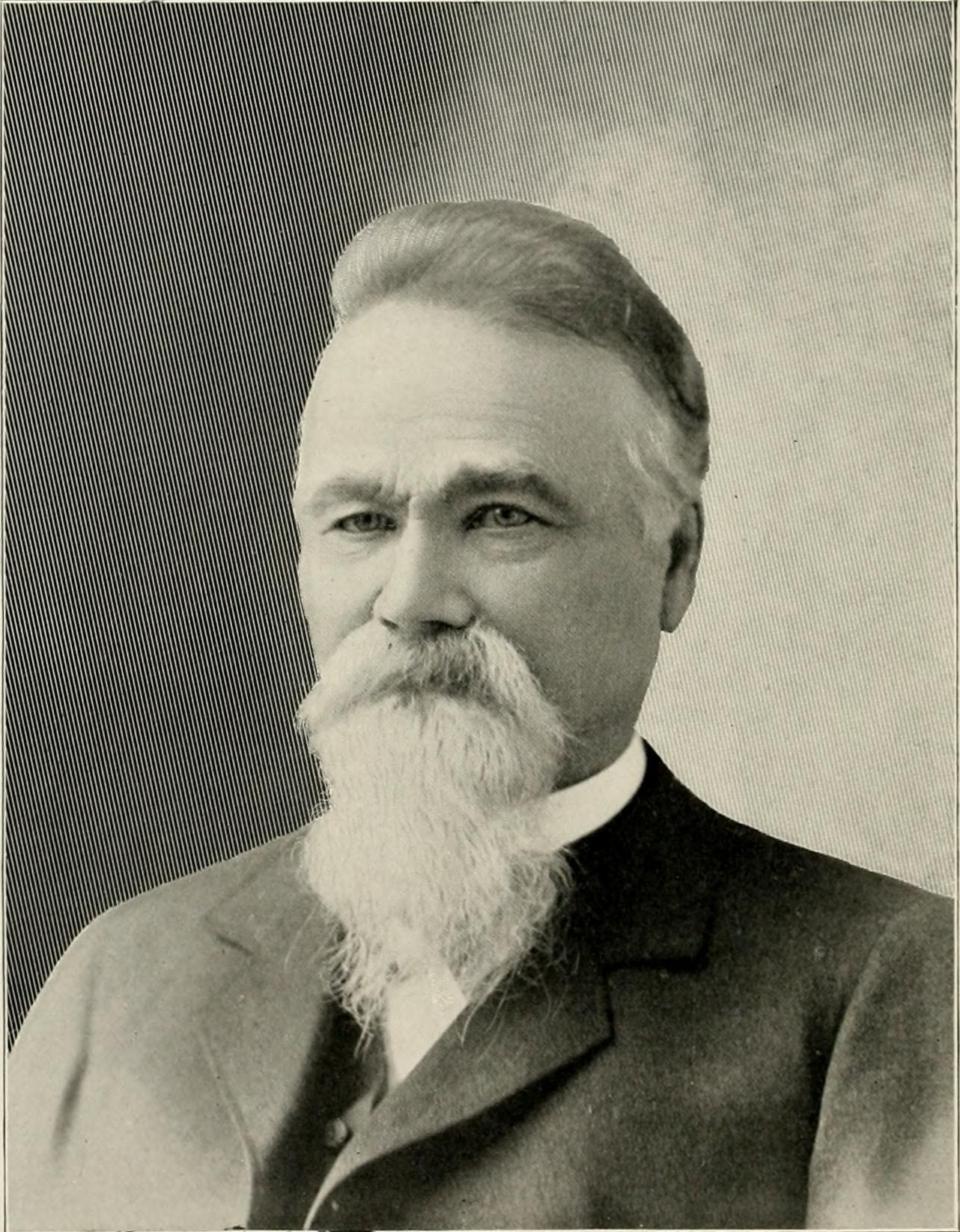
- Portrait from Historical and Biographical Record of Southern California (1902)

Member of the Wisconsin Senate from the 26th district
- In office January 2, 1882 – January 5, 1885
- Preceded by: Matthew Anderson
- Succeeded by: James Conklin

Sheriff of Dane County, Wisconsin
- In office January 1, 1873 – January 4, 1875
- Preceded by: Andrew Sexton
- Succeeded by: William C. Kiser

Member of the Wisconsin State Assembly from the Dane 3rd district
- In office January 1, 1872 – January 6, 1873
- Preceded by: Matthew Anderson
- Succeeded by: Otto Kerl
- In office January 4, 1869 – January 2, 1871
- Preceded by: Frank Gault
- Succeeded by: Matthew Anderson

Personal details
- Born: June 1, 1819 Pulaski County, Kentucky, U.S.
- Died: October 18, 1908 (aged 89) Pasadena, California, U.S.
- Resting place: Oak Hill Cemetery, Black Earth, Wisconsin
- Party: Democratic
- Spouse: Eliza Blanchard (m. 1846–1908)
- Children: Charles Adams^{(b. 1848; died 1870)}; Alva Adams^{(b. 1850; died 1922)}; George Adams^{(b. 1852; died 1871)}; John A. Adams^{(b. 1855; died 1930)}; Frank Adams^{(b. 1856; died 1927)}; Elizabeth Adams^{(b. 1859; died after 1911)}; William Herbert Adams^{(b. 1861; died 1954)}; Henry B. Adams^{(b. 1863; died 1865)}; Clarence Adams^{(b. 1869; died 1869)}
- Relatives: Alva B. Adams (grandson); Harry W. Adams (grandson)
- Occupation: Businessman, politician

John Adams (June 1, 1819 – October 18, 1908) was an American businessman, Democratic politician, and Wisconsin pioneer. He served three years each in the Wisconsin Senate and State Assembly, representing western Dane County. Adams founded the unincorporated settlement Adamsville, Wisconsin, now a ghost town.

Two of his sons, Alva Adams and William Herbert Adams, went on to become governors of Colorado. His grandson, Alva B. Adams, became a United States senator.

== Biography ==
John Adams was born on his family's homestead in Pulaski County, Kentucky, on June 1, 1819. At age 13, in 1832, he and a half-brother ventured to Rush County, Indiana, where they remained with family for two years before moving to Illinois. The brother squatted on land in Winnebago County, Illinois, eventually becoming the legal owner. John Adams moved into the Wisconsin Territory in 1840, settling in Dodgeville, where he went to work in the booming lead mining industry.

At Dodgeville, Adams held his first public office, when he was appointed postmaster for 1844 and 1845. After ten years living and laboring in the Dodgeville region, he moved to what is now Blue Mounds, Wisconsin. At the time the small settlement was known as "Pokerville" due to the large amount of gambling there. Adams became the first merchant and stock dealer active in the settlement and prospered in that business. After a few years, he entered into a partnership with John Bonner, and they established a caravan for a commissioning business to bring merchandise to the lumbering communities of northern Wisconsin. With his profits, he also began dealing in real estate.

In 1863, Adams moved to the town of Black Earth, Wisconsin, where he resided for the next 25 years. He established another store there, and became involved in local affairs and politics. In 1868, Adams was the Democratic Party nominee for Wisconsin State Assembly in Dane County's 3rd Assembly district, which then comprised roughly the northwest quadrant of the county. Adams won the election, defeating Republican Karl Erickson. Adams ran for re-election in 1869, and won another term, serving in the 1869 and 1870 legislative sessions. While serving in the Assembly, Adams was also a member of the town board of supervisors, and in 1870 he was elected chairman of the town board. He served a one-year term, and was an ex officio member of the Dane County Board of Supervisors.

Adams did not run for re-election to the Assembly in 1870. In 1871, his successor, Matthew Anderson, ran for Wisconsin Senate, and Adams ran again for Assembly. Adams was elected again, and served in the Assembly for the 1872 term.

In the Fall of 1872, the Dane County Democratic Party convention nominated Adams for sheriff of Dane County. Adams won the election in November, and served a two-year term as sheriff.

After serving as sheriff, Adams spent several years out of public office, but remained active with civic affairs and with the state and local Democratic Party. He discontinued his general merchant business and instead focused on his real estate dealings. His 1902 biography states that he was one of the largest landowners in Dane and Iowa counties during this era.

Adams returned to electoral politics in 1881, running for Wisconsin Senate in the 26th Senate district. The 26th Senate district at that time comprised roughly the western half of Dane County. Adams received the Democratic nomination and went on to defeat Republican candidate W. A. De Lamatyr with 53% of the vote in the general election. Adams election coincided with the ratification of an amendment to the state constitution which doubled the length of legislative terms. For Adams this just had the effect of extending what would have been a two-year term to a three-year term (to January 1885), though no additional sessions of the legislature took place in the year 1884. A redistricting also occurred in 1882, which combined all of Dane County into a single state Senate district; Adams did not run for re-election in the new district in 1884.

In December 1890, Adams moved to Pasadena, California, with his wife and adult daughter, where they remained for the rest of their lives. In Pasadena, Adams owned a small estate where he grew fruit on two acres of land.

== Personal life and family ==
John Adams was one of nine children born to John Adams and his wife Elizabeth (née Clemmons). His father, John, and grandfather, Zachariah, had served as volunteers in the War of 1812 and the American Revolutionary War, respectively. His maternal grandfather, Hezekiah Clemmons, also served in the Revolution. A brother, Charles, died while serving in the Mexican–American War.

John Adams married Eliza Blanchard at Dodgeville, in December 1846. Eliza was the daughter of pioneer Asahel Blanchard, and had arrived in the Wisconsin Territory two years earlier. Eliza's younger brother, Alvin Blanchard, became the founder and namesake of Blanchardville, Wisconsin.

Adams and his wife had one daughter and eight sons, though one son died in infancy and three others died young from tuberculosis. After their son George contracted the disease, Eliza took the remaining children on a wagon to the west reaching Colorado before George died. Eliza returned to Wisconsin with most of the children, but their eldest surviving son, Alva, decided to remain in Colorado. He grew in prominence there, eventually winning election as governor of Colorado. The other three surviving sons eventually returned to Colorado and also had successful careers in business and politics; William Herbert Adams served many years in the Colorado Legislature and was also elected governor.

Alva's son, Alva Blanchard Adams, became a United States senator from Colorado. Another of John Adams' grandsons, Harry W. Adams, remained in Wisconsin and became mayor of Beloit, Wisconsin, in the 1910s.

John Adams died at his home in Pasadena on October 18, 1908, after a long illness. His body was cremated and interred at Oak Hill Cemetery, in Black Earth, Wisconsin.

== Electoral history ==
=== Wisconsin Assembly (1868, 1869) ===
Year	Election	Date	Elected				Defeated				Total	Plurality
1868	General	Nov. 3	John Adams	Democratic			Karl Erickson	Rep.				
1869	General	Nov. 2	John Adams (inc)	Democratic	1,012	63.05%	James M. Bull	Rep.	593	36.95%	1,605	419

=== Wisconsin Assembly (1871) ===
Year	Election	Date	Elected				Defeated				Total	Plurality
1871	General	Nov. 7	John Adams	Democratic	1,076	56.78%	John Brosemer	Rep.	819	43.22%	1,895	257

=== Dane County Sheriff (1872) ===
Dane County Sheriff Election, 1872
Party	Candidate	Votes	%	±%
General Election, November 5, 1872
Democratic	John Adams	5,195	52.16%	
Republican	Bradford Hancock	4,760	47.79%	
	Scattering	5	0.05%	
Plurality		435	4.37%	
Total votes		9,960	100.0%	
Democratic gain from Republican				

=== Wisconsin Senate (1881) ===
Wisconsin Senate, 26th District Election, 1881
Party	Candidate	Votes	%	±%
General Election, November 5, 1881
Democratic	John Adams	1,439	52.71%	−2.76pp
Republican	W. A. De Lamatyr	1,244	45.57%	+7.62pp
Greenback	W. M. Matts	47	1.72%	−4.86pp
Plurality		195	7.14%	-10.38pp
Total votes		2,730	100.0%	-17.97%
Democratic gain from Republican				

Wisconsin State Assembly
Preceded by Frank Gault	Member of the Wisconsin State Assembly from the Dane 3rd district January 4, 1869 – January 2, 1871	Succeeded by Matthew Anderson
Preceded by Matthew Anderson	Member of the Wisconsin State Assembly from the Dane 3rd district January 1, 1872 – January 6, 1873	Succeeded by Otto Kerl
Wisconsin Senate
Preceded by Matthew Anderson	Member of the Wisconsin Senate from the 26th district January 2, 1882 – January 5, 1885	Succeeded by James Conklin
Legal offices
Preceded by Andrew Sexton	Sheriff of Dane County, Wisconsin; January 1, 1873 – January 4, 1875	Succeeded by William C. Kiser
