= Archie D. Sanders =

American politician (1857–1941)

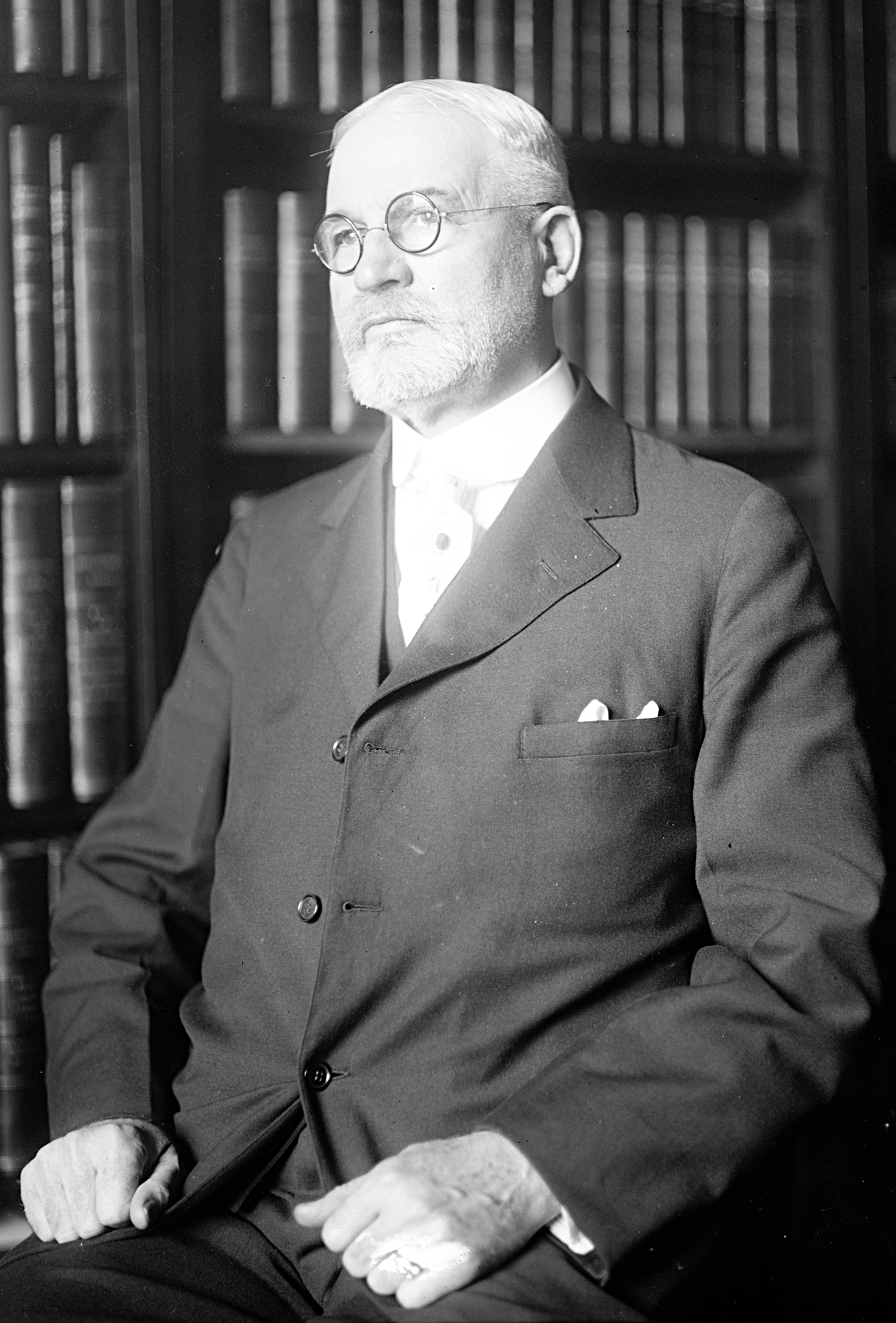
- Sanders, c. 1921

Member of the U.S. House of Representatives from New York's 39th district
- In office March 4, 1917 – March 3, 1933
- Preceded by: Henry G. Danforth
- Succeeded by: James W. Wadsworth, Jr.

Member of the New York Senate from the 44th district
- In office January 1, 1915 – December 31, 1916
- Preceded by: Thomas H. Bussey
- Succeeded by: John Knight

Member of the New York State Assembly from the Wyoming district
- In office January 1, 1896 – December 31, 1897
- Preceded by: Thomas B. Tuttle
- Succeeded by: John J. Ellis

Personal details
- Born: June 17, 1857 Stafford, New York
- Died: July 15, 1941 (aged 84) Rochester, New York
- Party: Republican
- Occupation: Politician

Archie Dovell Sanders (June 17, 1857 – July 15, 1941) was a Republican member of the United States House of Representatives from New York.

== Life ==
Sanders was born in Stafford, New York in 1857. He was a member of the New York State Assembly (Genesee Co.) in 1896 and 1897. He was a delegate to the 1896 and 1924 Republican National Conventions. He was a member of the New York State Senate (44th D.) in 1915 and 1916. He was elected to Congress in 1916 and served from March 4, 1917, until March 3, 1933. He was serving as the chairman of the Genesee County Republican Committee when he died in Rochester, New York in 1941.

== Sources ==
- United States Congress. "Archie D. Sanders (id: S000032)". Biographical Directory of the United States Congress.

New York State Assembly
Preceded by Thomas B. Tuttle	New York State Assembly; Genesee County; 1896–1897	Succeeded by John J. Ellis
New York State Senate
Preceded by Thomas H. Bussey	New York State Senate; 44th District; 1915–1916	Succeeded by John Knight
U.S. House of Representatives
Preceded by Henry G. Danforth	Member of the U.S. House of Representatives from New York's 39th congressional district 1917–1933	Succeeded by James W. Wadsworth, Jr.
