= Lutheran Hill, Wisconsin =

- Unincorporated community
- Location within Wisconsin Location within the United States
- Coordinates: 43°12′30″N 89°36′02″W
- Country: United States
- State: Wisconsin
- County: Dane
- Towns: Dane, Roxbury
- Elevation: 1,165 ft (355 m)
- Time zone: UTC-6 (Central (CST))
  - Summer (DST): UTC-5 (CDT)
- Area code: 608
- GNIS feature ID: 1842511

Lutheran Hill is an unincorporated community in the towns of Dane and Roxbury in Dane County, Wisconsin, United States.
