= Thomas H. Bussey =

American politician

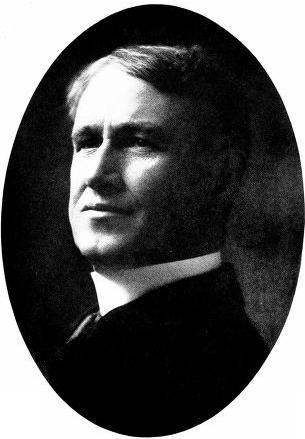
Thomas H. Bussey (1916)

Thomas H. Bussey (February 25, 1857 Troy, Rensselaer County, New York – March 9, 1937, New York City) was an American politician from New York.

== Life ==
Bussey attended Rensselaer Polytechnic Institute. He was superintendent of a knitting mill in Perry. He was at times Supervisor of the Town of Perry; President of the Village of Perry; and Chairman of the Board of Supervisors of Wyoming County, New York.

Bussey was a member of the New York State Senate (44th D.) from 1911 to 1914, sitting in the 134th, 135th, 136th and 137th New York State Legislatures. He was a member of the New York State Commission for the Panama–Pacific International Exposition in 1915.

== Death ==
He died on March 9, 1937, in New York City and was buried in Pipersville, Pennsylvania.

== Source ==
New York State Senate
Preceded by George H. Witter	New York State Senate; 44th District; 1911–1914	Succeeded by Archie D. Sanders
