= Roxbury (community), Wisconsin =

Roxbury, Wisconsin
- Unincorporated community
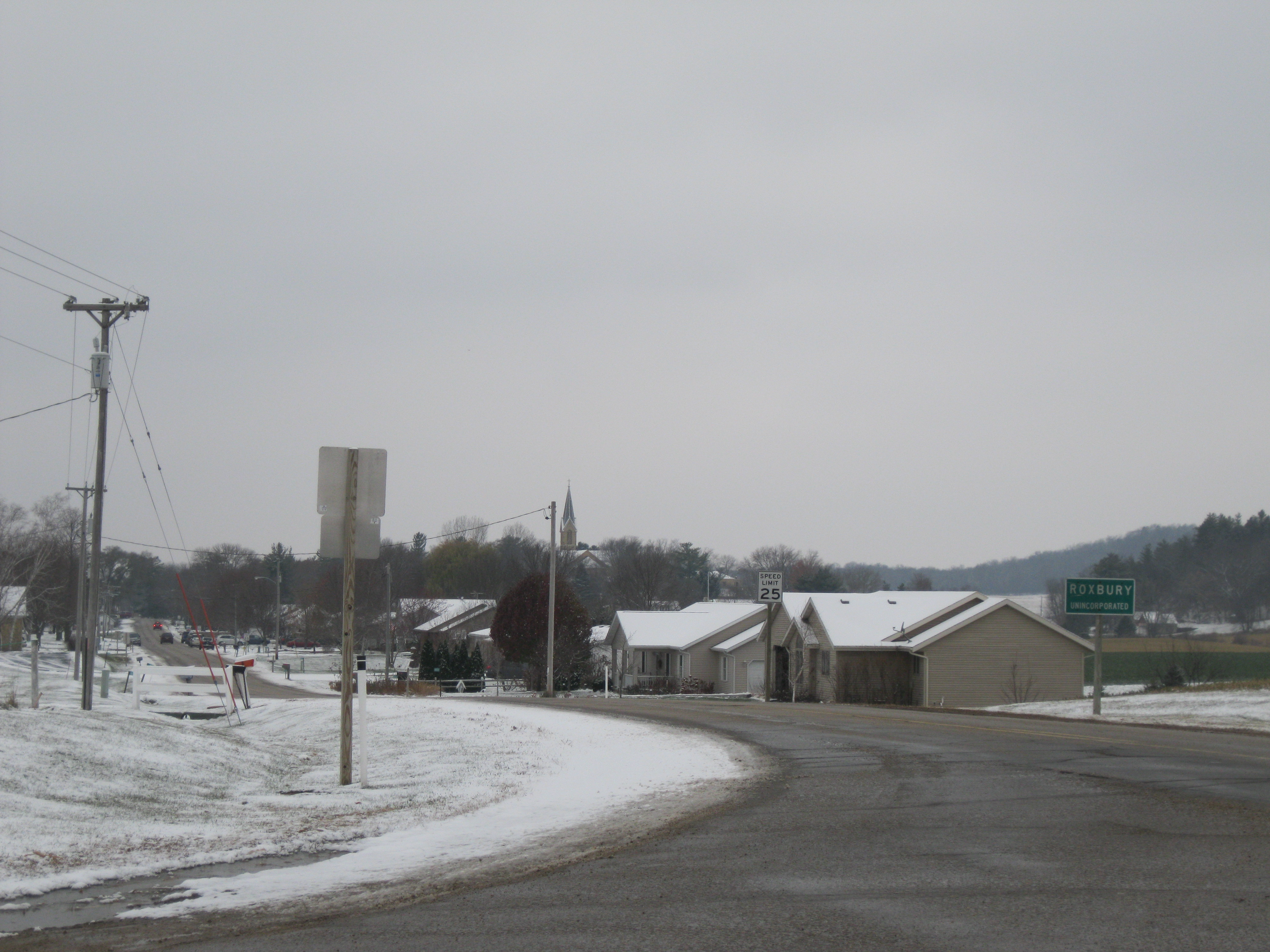
- Entering Roxbury on County Highway Y

- Location within Wisconsin Location within the United States
- Coordinates: 43°14′58″N 89°40′31″W
- Country: United States
- State: Wisconsin
- County: Dane County
- Town: Roxbury
- Elevation: 866 ft (264 m)
- Time zone: UTC-6 (Central (CST))
  - Summer (DST): UTC-5 (CDT)
- Area code: 608
- GNIS feature ID: 1572693

Roxbury is an unincorporated community located in the town of Roxbury, Dane County, Wisconsin, United States.

== Gallery ==
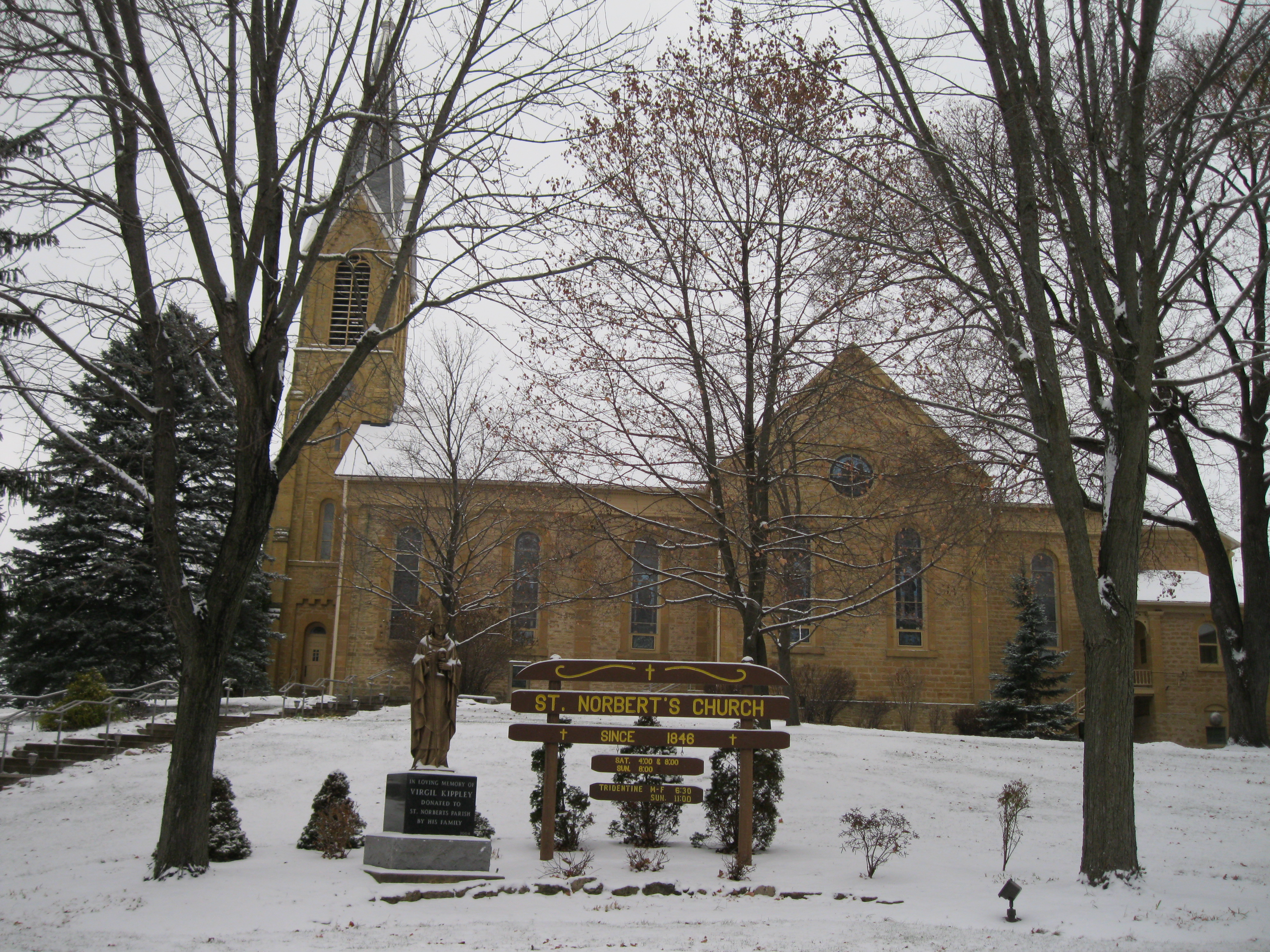
St. Norbert's Church

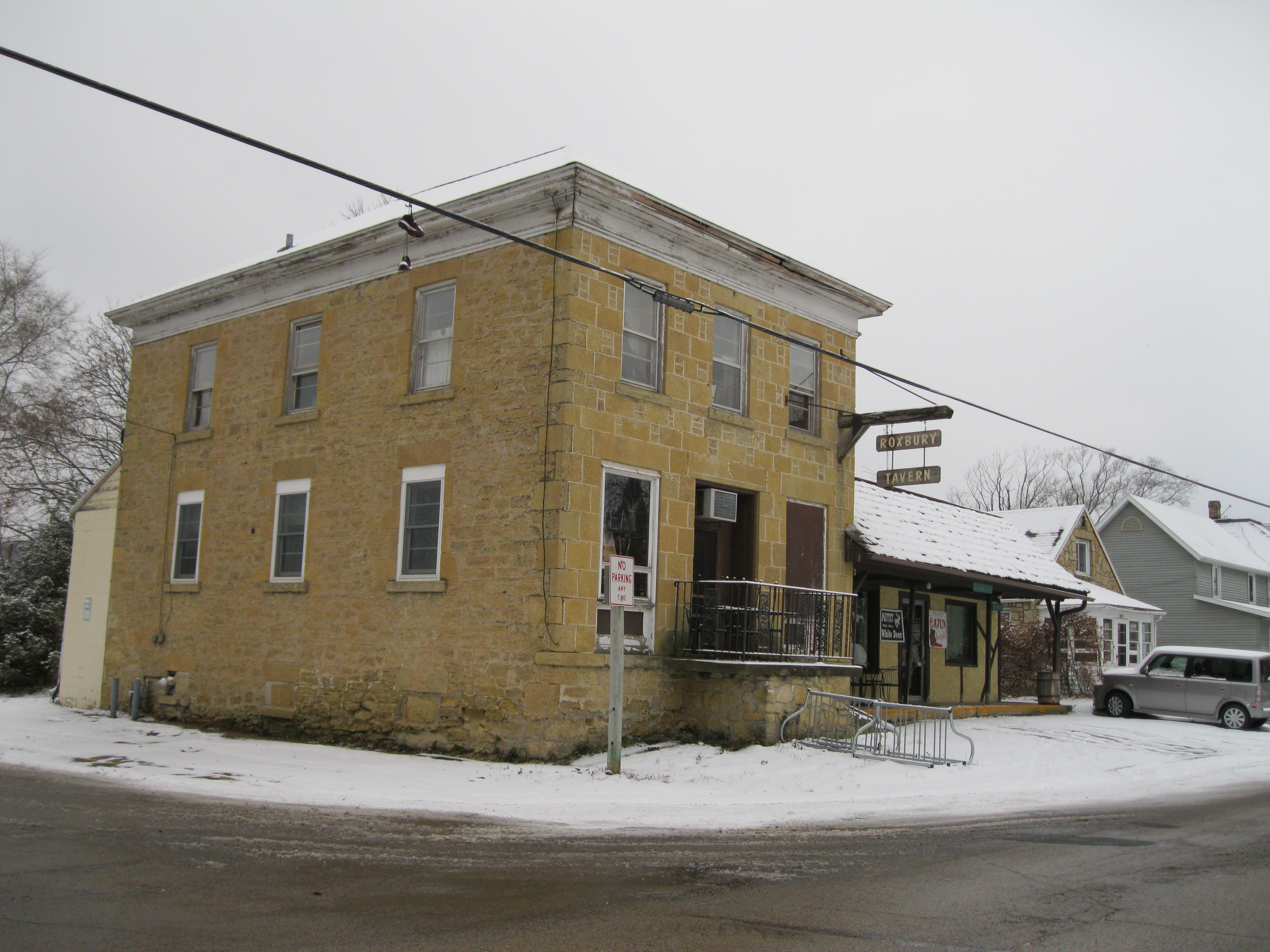
Roxbury Tavern

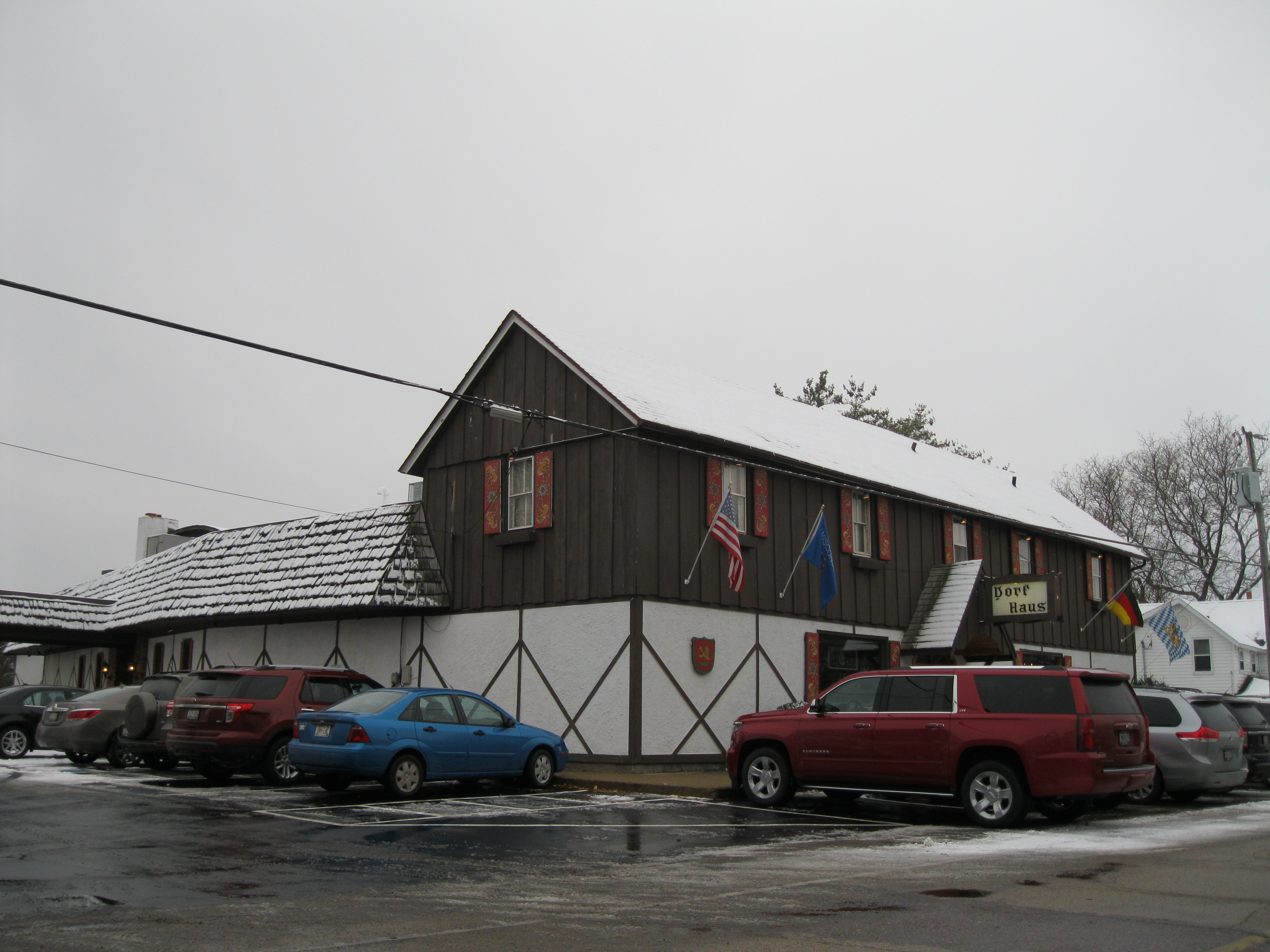
Dorf Haus
