= S. Percy Hooker =

American politician

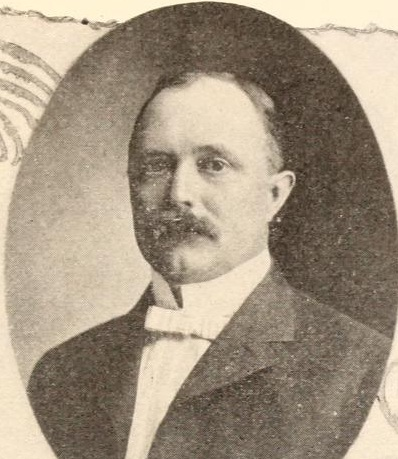
S. Percy Hooker (1902)

Samuel Percy Hooker (December 5, 1860 – April 24, 1915) was an American politician from New York and New Hampshire.

== Life ==
He was born on December 5, 1860, in Black Earth, Dane County, Wisconsin, the son of Samuel Lucius Hooker and Ellen Amanda (Kelley) Hooker. The family moved to Le Roy, New York, in 1866. He attended Le Roy Academic Institute, and graduated from Phillips Exeter Academy in 1879. Then he worked for a manufacturer of patent medicines. On April 19, 1882, he married Elizabeth Whalen, and they had one daughter. Later he also engaged in banking and farming.

Hooker was a member of the New York State Assembly (Genesee Co.) in 1902, 1903, 1904, 1905 and 1906; and of the New York State Senate (44th D.) in 1907 and 1908.

On January 6, 1909, he was appointed by Gov. Charles Evans Hughes to a six-year term as Chairman of the New York State Highway Commission. The latter had been created by the Legislature in 1908, and consisted of three members. On June 6, 1911, Hooker was legislated out of office when the Legislature created a State Superintendent of Highways to succeed the Highway Commission. On March 1, 1912, Hooker took office as New Hampshire State Engineer of Highways.

He died on April 24, 1915, in the New York Hospital in Manhattan.

== Sources ==
New York State Assembly
Preceded by John J. Ellis	New York State Assembly; Genesee County; 1902–1906	Succeeded by Fred B. Parker
New York State Senate
Preceded by William W. Armstrong	New York State Senate; 44th District; 1907–1908	Succeeded by George H. Witter
