= Mazo Beach =

Protected area in Wisconsin, US

Mazomanie Bottoms State Natural Area
- Location within Wisconsin Location within the United States
- Location: Dane County, Wisconsin
- Coordinates: 43°13′30″N 89°48′57″W
- Area: 352 acres (142 ha)
- Established: 1978
- Owner: Wisconsin Department of Natural Resources
- Website: Official website
- Wisconsin State Natural Areas

Mazo Beach is the colloquial name for Mazomanie Bottoms State Natural Area, located in Sauk County in the U.S. state of Wisconsin. Property along the river was acquired in parcels by the State of Wisconsin since the 1950s to provide a full range of nature based activities including hiking, wildlife viewing, hunting, fishing, and wildlife habitat. Since 1978, the beach and surrounding nature preserve have attracted picnickers and swimming day-trippers to its open and expansive shoreline.

The Mazomanie Bottoms encompasses a large area of Wisconsin River floodplain forest dissected by old river channels that are dry except during periodic floods. Silver maple, elm, basswood, and ash dominate the forest; other trees include swamp white oak, cottonwood, willow, river birch, and hackberry. Openings in the canopy due to elm mortality have a dense understory of gray dogwood, prickly ash, buckthorn, and young trees. Ridges of sand support oaks, but the slough margins are nearly pure silver maple. Vining plants and lianas are found in abundance: virgin's bower, moonseed, wild cucumber, woodbine, poison ivy, carrion flower, grape, and wild yam. Sand bars and ephemeral pools along the river add considerable diversity. The forest harbors thousands of migrating birds. Nesting birds include these uncommon species: cerulean (Dendroica cerulea), Kentucky (Oporornis formosus), prothonotary (Protontaria citrea) and mourning warblers, winter wren, and brown creeper. The site has a large woodpecker population and is used in winter by bald eagles (Haliaeetus leucocephalus). Mazomanie Bottoms is owned by the DNR and was designated a State Natural Area in 1978. Seasonal changes shape the river, thereby altering the beach's size. This along with additional Wisconsin Department of Natural Resources (DNR) changing land restrictions means the actual beach area changes annually. Camping is not allowed on the sandbars near Mazomanie Bottoms.

On a hot summer weekend, the beach may see hundreds of people to include families with children and recreational boaters. In the past, conservation groups have occasionally protested near the beach to ensure it remains open and free to all the citizens of Wisconsin. The clothing optional beach lies along the Lower Wisconsin River, located in the northwest corner of Dane County in the Town of Mazomanie between the Village of Mazomanie and Sauk City, Wisconsin.

In 2013, a bill passed closing the beach on weekdays. On March 8, 2016, the DNR closed the beach until further notice, citing illegal activity. The state is updating its master plan for redevelopment of the area, but Mazo Beach was left out. Prior to the closure, it had been described as one of the "most popular nude beaches" in the country.
