= Black Earth (town), Wisconsin =

Black Earth, Wisconsin
- Town
- Town of Black Earth
- Location in Dane County, Wisconsin
- Coordinates: 43°08′41″N 89°47′41″W
- Country: United States
- State: Wisconsin
- County: Dane

Area
  - Total: 17.11 sq mi (44.3 km^{2})
  - Land: 17.08 sq mi (44.2 km^{2})
  - Water: 0.04 sq mi (0.10 km^{2})

Population (2020)
  - Total: 510
  - Density: 30/sq mi (12/km^{2})
- Time zone: UTC-6 (Central (CST))
  - Summer (DST): UTC-5 (CDT)
- Area code(s): 608 and 353
- GNIS feature ID: 1582821

The Town of Black Earth is located in Dane County, Wisconsin, United States. The population was 510 at the 2020 census.

== Geography ==
According to the United States Census Bureau, the town has a total area of 17.3 square miles (44.8 km^{2}), all land.

== History ==
The Town of Black Earth was formed out of the Town of Springfield on August 2, 1848, as Farmersville. The town was renamed Black Earth on February 1, 1851. Much of the territory of the current towns of Berry and Mazomanie was originally part of Farmersville/Black Earth.

== Demographics ==
As of the census of 2000, there were 449 people, 166 households, and 138 families living in the town. The population density was 26.0 people per square mile (10.0/km^{2}). There were 172 housing units at an average density of 10.0 per square mile (3.8/km^{2}). The racial makeup of the town was 98.44% White, 0.67% Black or African American, 0.45% Asian, and 0.45% from two or more races. 0.45% of the population were Hispanic or Latino of any race.

There were 166 households, out of which 32.5% had children under the age of 18 living with them, 74.1% were married couples living together, 3.6% had a female householder with no husband present, and 16.3% were non-families. 12.0% of all households were made up of individuals, and 4.2% had someone living alone who was 65 years of age or older. The average household size was 2.70 and the average family size was 2.93.

The population was 25.2% under the age of 18, 4.9% from 18 to 24, 27.6% from 25 to 44, 31.4% from 45 to 64, and 10.9% who were 65 years of age or older. The median age was 40 years. For every 100 females, there were 118 males. For every 100 females age 18 and over, there were 117 males.

The median income for a household in the town was $61,364, and the median income for a family was $63,333. Males had a median income of $40,625 versus $29,722 for females. The per capita income for the town was $24,351. None of the population or families were below the poverty line.

== Notable people ==
- John Adams, member of the Wisconsin State Assembly and the Wisconsin State Senate
- S. Percy Hooker, member of the New York State Assembly
