= Matthew Anderson (politician) =

19th century American politician

Member of the Wisconsin Senate from the 26th district
- In office January 7, 1878 – January 2, 1882
- Preceded by: Romanzo E. Davis
- Succeeded by: John Adams

Member of the Wisconsin State Assembly from the Dane 3rd district
- In office January 2, 1871 – January 1, 1872
- Preceded by: John Adams
- Succeeded by: John Adams

Personal details
- Born: March 9, 1822 County Londonderry, Ireland, UK
- Died: April 22, 1910 (aged 88) Mount Horeb, Wisconsin, U.S.
- Resting place: Bellefontaine City Cemetery, Bellefontaine, Ohio
- Party: Democratic
- Spouses: Elizabeth C. Harner (m. 1847; died 1880); Harriett Arland (m. 1882–1910)
- Children: George W. Anderson^{(b. 1848; died 1849)}; John F. Anderson^{(b. 1849; died 1850)}; Georgiana Anderson^{(b. 1851; died 1852)}; David Anderson^{(b. 1860; died 1941)}

Matthew Anderson (March 9, 1822 – April 22, 1910) was an Irish American immigrant, businessman, and Democratic politician. He served four years in the Wisconsin State Senate and one year in the State Assembly, representing western Dane County. He also served as mayor of Bellefontaine, Ohio.

== Early life ==
Anderson was born to George and Jane Anderson on March 9, 1822, in County Londonderry, Ireland.

== Career ==
Anderson owned shoe shops in Lancaster County, Pennsylvania, and Bellefontaine, Ohio. He served as the mayor of Bellefontaine in 1851 and was a council member there. He then moved to Cross Plains, Wisconsin, in 1860, where he owned a farm.

Anderson was a member of the Wisconsin State Assembly in 1871 before being elected to the Wisconsin State Senate in 1877 and 1879, serving until 1881. In addition, he was chairman of the Township Board of Cross Plains. He was a Democrat.

== Personal life ==
On June 22, 1847, Anderson married Elizabeth C. Harner. They had six children before her death on March 30, 1880. Anderson later married Harriet Arland on March 8, 1882.

Anderson died of old age in his home in Mount Horeb, Wisconsin, and was buried in Bellefontaine, Ohio.
