= George H. Witter =

American politician (1854–1913)

Member of the New York State Senate from the 44th district
- In office January 1, 1909 – December 31, 1910
- Preceded by: S. Percy Hooker
- Succeeded by: Thomas H. Bussey

Personal details
- Born: August 23, 1854 Willing, New York, U.S.
- Died: February 12, 1913 (aged 58)
- Resting place: Woodlawn Cemetery
- Party: Republican
- Spouse: Maude Bingham (m. 1889)
- Children: 2
- Education: United States Military Academy; College of Physicians and Surgeons
- Occupation: Politician, physician

George H. Witter (August 23, 1854 – February 12, 1913) was an American physician and politician from New York.

== Life ==
Witter was born in Willing, New York, on August 23, 1854. His parents were Daniel P. Witter and Betsey Foster.

Witter spent two years in West Point, after which he attended the College of Physicians and Surgeons in Baltimore, Maryland. After he graduated from the college as a physician in 1885, he began to practice medicine in Wellsville.

In Wellsville, Witter formed a partnership with Dr. H. H. Nye, his former medical teacher. He later succeeded to Nye's former practice. For many years, he served as company surgeon for the Erie Railroad and the Buffalo and Susquehanna Railroad. He was a member of the country, district, and state medical associations, the American Medical Association, the Hornell Medical Association, and the Surgical Association. He was also a member of the Wellsville board of education and vice-president of the First National Bank of Wellsville. He served as town supervisor of Wellsville, and was a member of the Republican County Committee of Allegany County and the New York Republican State Committee.

In the 1896 presidential election, Witter was a presidential elector for William McKinley and Garret Hobart. In 1908, he was elected to the New York State Senate as a Republican, representing the 44th District. He served in the Senate in 1909 and 1910.

Witter was a member and trustee of the Congregational Church. In 1889, he married Maude Bingham. They had two daughters, Grace and Margaret.

Witter died at home on February 12, 1913. He was buried in Woodlawn Cemetery.

New York State Senate
| Preceded by S. Percy Hooker | New York State Senate; 44th District; 1909-1910 | Succeeded by Thomas H. Bussey |
