= Blue Mounds (town), Wisconsin =

Blue Mounds
- Town
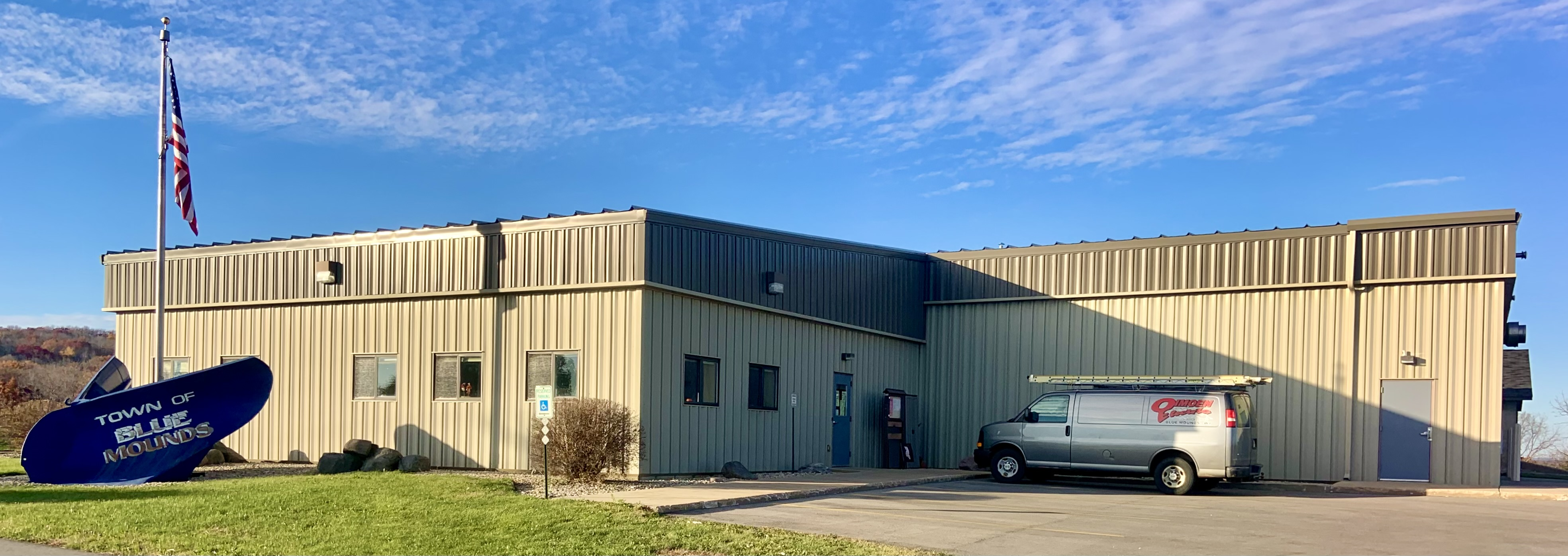
- Town hall

- Location in Dane County and the state of Wisconsin.

- Location within Wisconsin Location within the United States
- Coordinates: 42°59′43″N 89°46′48″W
- Country: United States
- State: Wisconsin
- Counties: Dane County

Area
  - Total: 32.48 sq mi (84.1 km^{2})
  - Land: 32.47 sq mi (84.1 km^{2})
  - Water: 0.01 sq mi (0.026 km^{2})

Population (2020)
  - Total: 899
  - Density: 27.7/sq mi (10.7/km^{2})
- Time zone: UTC-6 (Central (CST))
  - Summer (DST): UTC-5 (CDT)
- Zip code: 53517
- Area code: 608
- Website: https://tn.bluemounds.wi.gov/

Blue Mounds is a town in Dane County, Wisconsin, United States. The population was 899 at the 2020 census. The Village of Blue Mounds is located within the town.

== Geography ==
According to the United States Census Bureau, the town has a total area of 33.0 square miles (85 km^{2}), of which 33.0 square miles (85.5 km^{2}) is land and 0.03% is water.

== Demographics ==
As of the census of 2000, there were 842 people, 291 households, and 247 families residing in the town. The population density was 25.5 people per square mile (9.8 people/km^{2}). There were 300 housing units at an average density of 9.1 units per square mile (3.5 units/km^{2}). The racial makeup of the town was 98.34% White, 0.12% Black or African American, 0.59% Native American, 0.36% Asian, 0.12% from other races, and 0.48% from two or more races. 0.48% of the population were Hispanic or Latino of any race.

There were 291 households, out of which 41.6% had children under the age of 18 living with them, 77.0% were married couples living together, 4.5% had a female householder with no husband present, and 14.8% were non-families. 10.0% of all households were made up of individuals, and 3.8% had someone living alone who was 65 years of age or older. The average household size was 2.89 and the average family size was 3.13.

In the town, the population was spread out, with 30.6% under the age of 18, 4.2% from 18 to 24, 28.5% from 25 to 44, 26.6% from 45 to 64, and 10.1% who were 65 years of age or older. The median age was 39 years. For every 100 females, there were 101.4 males. For every 100 females age 18 and over, there were 104.9 males.

The median income for a household in the town was $61,429, and the median income for a family was $64,028. Males had a median income of $41,563 versus $29,205 for females. The per capita income for the town was $27,696. About 4.4% of families and 5.0% of the population were below the poverty line, including 7.0% of those under age 18 and none of those age 65 or over.
