= Madison (town), Wisconsin =

Former town in Dane County, Wisconsin

Town of Madison, Wisconsin
- Town
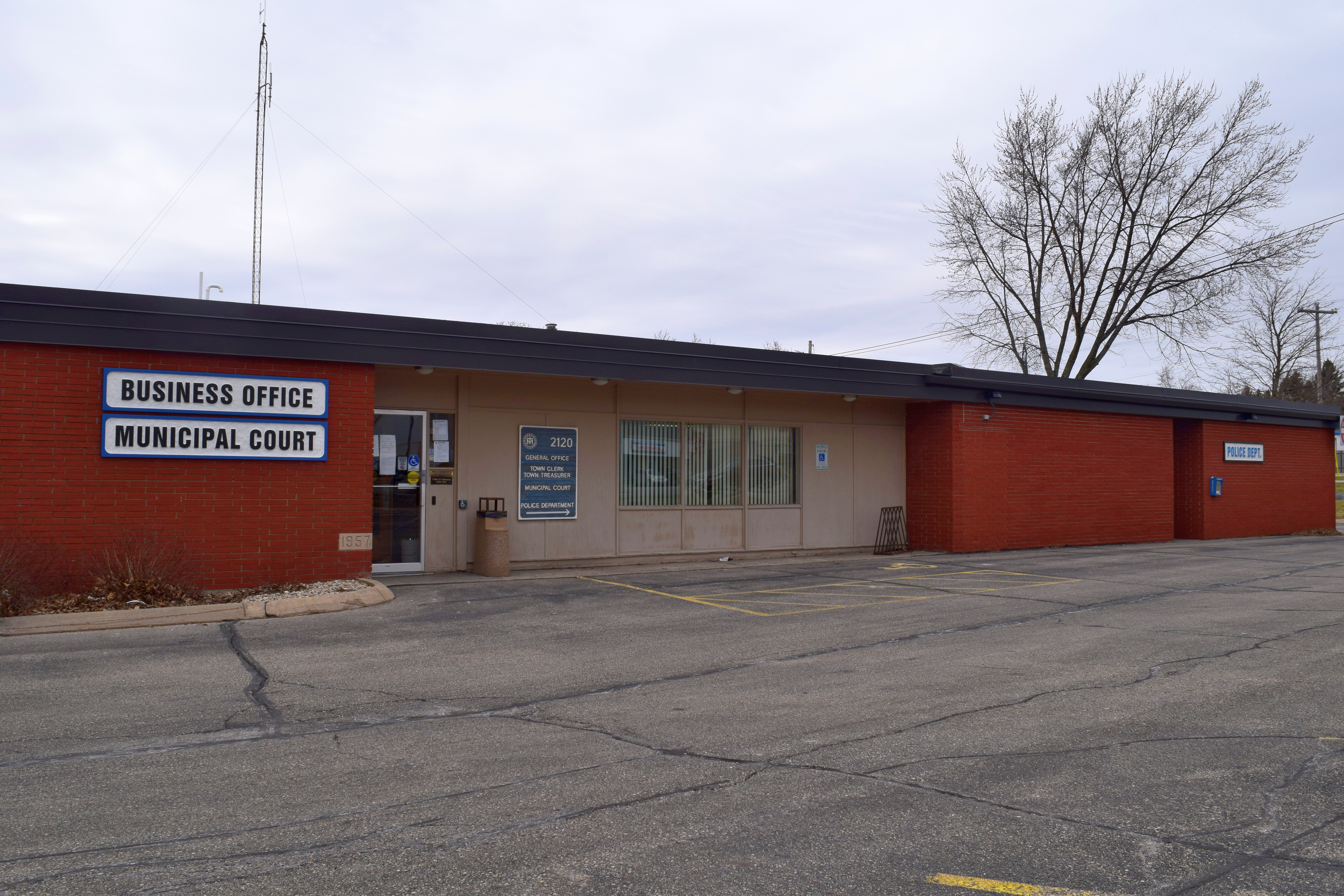
- Town of Madison Municipal Building

- Location in Dane County and the state of Wisconsin.

- Location within Wisconsin Location within the United States
- Coordinates: 43°2′32″N 89°24′5″W
- Country: United States
- State: Wisconsin
- County: Dane

Area
  - Total: 1.5 sq mi (3.9 km^{2})
  - Land: 1.48 sq mi (3.8 km^{2})
  - Water: 0.01 sq mi (0.026 km^{2})
- Elevation: 846 ft (258 m)

Population (2020)
  - Total: 6,236
  - Density: 4,324.1/sq mi (1,669.5/km^{2})
- Time zone: UTC-6 (Central (CST))
  - Summer (DST): UTC-5 (CDT)
- Area code: 608
- FIPS code: 55-48025
- GNIS feature ID: 1583626

The Town of Madison was located in Dane County, Wisconsin, United States. Established in 1836, the town ceased to exist on October 31, 2022. Its population was 6,236 at the 2020 United States census. The majority of the town's territory was situated along the Madison Beltline Highway, comprising several neighborhoods situated between the south side of the city of Madison, and the north side of the city of Fitchburg. The town also had territory on the north side of Madison near the border with Maple Bluff, as well as a few lots on the west side of Madison near Whitney Way. The Dane County Expo Center and Alliant Energy Center were situated within the Town of Madison. Despite its status as an unincorporated community, the Town of Madison provided a variety of services to its residents that typically would be found only in incorporated cities and villages, including trash and recycling services; police, fire and emergency medical services; sewer and water utilities; and three public parks.

== History ==
The original Town of Madison encompassed approximately 36 square miles (93 km^{2}), and was organized on February 2, 1846. In 1856 the Wisconsin Legislature chartered the city of Madison, leaving the remainder as the town. Most of this land was gradually incorporated into various municipalities, especially the City of Madison, leaving the town as a collection of discontinuous areas subject to annexation. For example, the Burr Oaks neighborhood had an area in the Town of Madison and an area in the City of Madison, connected by Cypress Way. That was the same case with part of the Capitol View Heights neighborhood, connected by Sundstrom and Nygard Streets.

In the wake of continued controversy and an effort in the state legislature to simply abolish the town, an agreement was reached in 2003 to provide for the incorporation of the remaining portions of the town (by then down to less than 3.9 square miles (10 km^{2}), including bodies of water) into the city of Madison and the city of Fitchburg on October 31, 2022. The dissolution took place on schedule.

== Geography ==
According to the United States Census Bureau, the town had a total area of 1.5 square miles (3.9 km^{2}), of which 1.4 square miles (3.6 km^{2}) was land and 0.01 square miles (0.026 km^{2}) (0.67%) was water.

== Demographics ==
Historical population
Census	Pop.	Note	%±
1870	857		—
1880	735		−14.2%
1890	919		25.0%
1900	1,567		70.5%
1910	1,705		8.8%
1920	2,327		36.5%
1930	3,355		44.2%
1940	4,638		38.2%
1950	4,195		−9.6%
1960	4,925		17.4%
1970	4,568		−7.2%
1980	6,162		34.9%
1990	6,442		4.5%
2000	7,005		8.7%
2010	6,279		−10.4%
2020	6,277		0.0%
U.S. Decennial Census

As of the census of 2010, there were 6,279 people, 2,852 households, and 1,212 families residing in the town. The population density was 4,234.1 people per square mile (1,669.5/km^{2}). There were 3,069 housing units at an average density of 2,069.5 per square mile (799/km^{2}). The racial makeup of the town was 54.6% White, 20.1% Black or African American, 0.9% Native American, 5.9% Asian, 0.0% Pacific Islander, 13.7% from other races, and 4.8% from two or more races. 28.0% of the population were Hispanic or Latino of any race.

There were 2,852 households, out of which 25.4% had children under the age of 18 living with them, 22.6% were married couples living together, 13.6% had a female householder with no husband present, and 57.5% were non-families. 41.8% of all households were made up of individuals, and 3.7% had someone living alone who was 65 years of age or older. The average household size was 2.20 and the average family size was 3.19.

In the town, the population was spread out, with 23.2% under the age of 18, 16.8% from 18 to 25, 36.8% from 25 to 44, 18.8% from 45 to 64, and 4.4% who were 65 years of age or older. The median age was 28.6 years. For every 100 females, there were 110.9 males. For every 100 females age 18 and over, there were 109.8 males.

The median income for a household in the town was $29,766, and the median income for a family was $37,344. Males had a median income of $31,450 versus $25,795 for females. The per capita income for the town was $19,566. About 22.0% of families and 25.9% of the population were below the poverty line, including 51.2% of those under age 18 and 11.1% of those age 65 or over.
