= Roxbury, Wisconsin =

Town of Roxbury
- Town
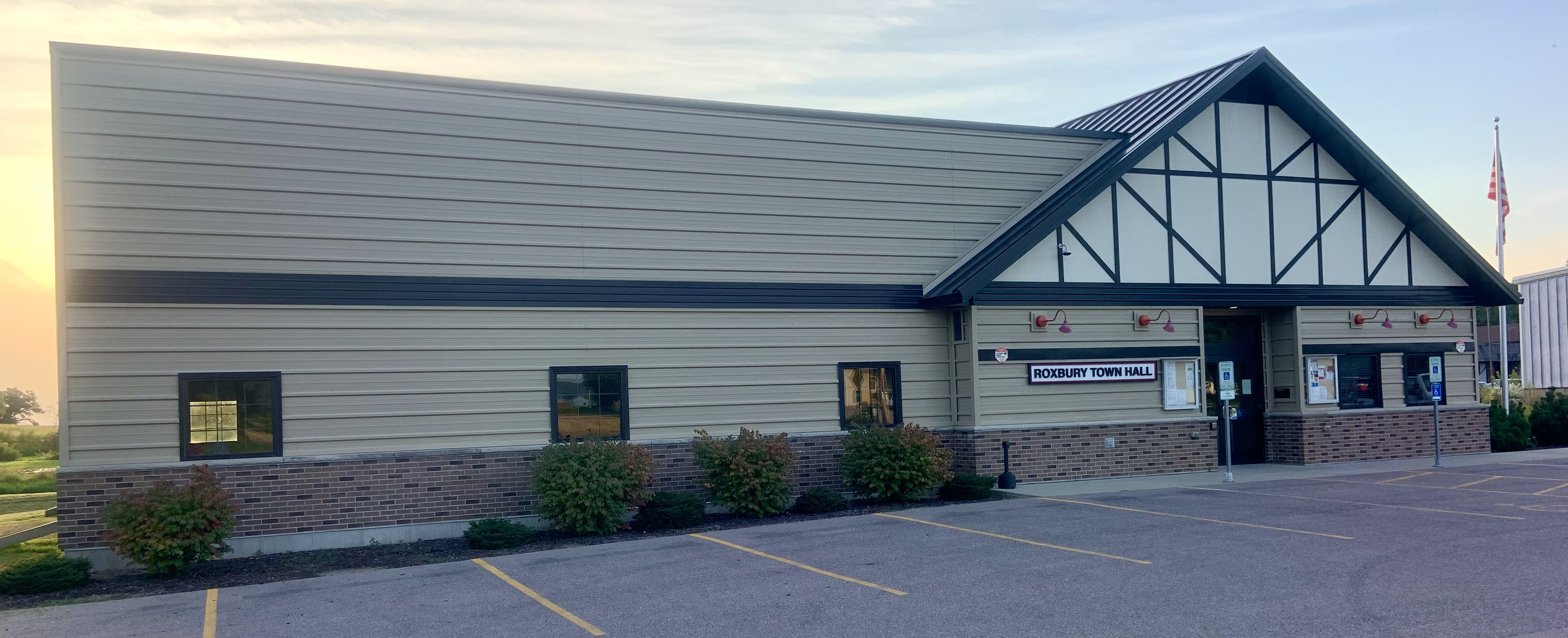
- Town hall

- Location of the Town of Roxbury in Dane County and the state of Wisconsin.
- Coordinates: 43°15′34″N 89°39′57″W
- Country: United States
- State: Wisconsin
- County: Dane

Area
  - Total: 35.9 sq mi (93.0 km^{2})
  - Land: 34.6 sq mi (89.6 km^{2})
  - Water: 1.3 sq mi (3.4 km^{2})
- Elevation: 1,047 ft (319 m)

Population (2020)
  - Total: 1,871
  - Density: 54.1/sq mi (20.9/km^{2})
- Time zone: UTC-6 (Central (CST))
  - Summer (DST): UTC-5 (CDT)
- Area code: 608
- FIPS code: 55-69850
- GNIS feature ID: 1584070
- Website: https://town.roxbury.wi.us/

The Town of Roxbury is located in Dane County, Wisconsin, United States. The population was 1,871 at the 2020 census. The unincorporated communities of Alden Corners and Roxbury are located in the town. The unincorporated community of Lutheran Hill is also located partially in the town.

== History ==
The Town of Roxbury has been called "Dane County's most historic township (sic)". Among its earliest recorded occurrences is the Battle of Wisconsin Heights, the penultimate engagement of the 1832 Black Hawk War between the United States militia and the Sauk and Meskwaki tribes, led by Black Hawk. After being pursued from Illinois, Black Hawk's band took a stand against the militia just south of the Wisconsin River, in what is today the Town of Roxbury. Although Black Hawk's band took severe casualties, their stand allowed several hundred noncombatant Sauk and Meskwaki to retreat to the Mississippi River which saved their lives.

Five years later, Charles Floyd, an Eastern speculator, established a company whose goal was to build an exemplary city in the Midwest. Floyd bought over 300 acres (1.2 km^{2}) of land in section 19 in the Town of Roxbury and had it surveyed. Then he drew up a map depicting streets, public buildings, and parks in what he called the "City of Superior", boasting that he would make the area known throughout the country. His map was circulated in Chicago, New York, and Boston, along with glowing descriptions of the city. Lots were sold to investors, including Daniel Webster, but there were no settlers. The 1842 census showed only two residents in the town. Floyd's grand plan had been a failure.

A settlement located across the Wisconsin River, in what is today Sauk City, was the impetus for the next development in Roxbury. In 1840, Agoston Haraszthy, a colorful nobleman and political refugee from Hungary, arrived in the United States. By 1841, he had purchased a large parcel of land where Sauk City now stands. He also built a hunting lodge, opposite his home, on a bluff in Roxbury overlooking the river. For the next several years, Haraszthy was active as a trader, hunter, steamboat operator, and viticulturist, and his business activities attracted attention to the area. He established a ferry that crossed the river, connecting Roxbury with Sauk City (then named "Haraszthy"), and in 1841, Robert Richards and Jacob Fraelich, the ferry operators, became the first settlers in Roxbury after Haraszthy.

For several years, no other settlers appeared in the town. Then in 1845, Rev. Adelbert Inama, a Norbertine missionary originally from the Tirol in Austria, arrived in the area. Impressed with what he found, Inama extolled the virtues of Roxbury to his superiors in Austria:

It lies in a district of the Wisconsin Territory as healthful as it is fruitful, on the elevated shores of the Wisconsin River, opposite Prairie du Sac, in the midst of mining districts, only 20 English miles from the capital, Madison, and well suited to become quickly and easily populated. The place is joined in three different directions with European seaports, by means of an unbroken waterway: to the south by means of the Mississippi to New Orleans; to the east by means of the Erie Canal to New York; to the north by means of the Saint Lawrence River and the Great Lakes. I certainly maintain that at present few localities can outdo the environs of Sac Prairie in fertility, variety, romantic beauty, and healthfulness of climate.

Inama's active promotion of the area was instrumental in attracting immigrants, mostly from German territories, particularly Bavaria. Within two years of his arrival, 15 families had settled in Roxbury.

Known as "the Apostle of the Four Lakes Region" because of his pioneering missionary work in the area, Inama established the first Catholic church in Dane County in Roxbury. In 1845, he erected a log chapel in section 18 of the town. Church services were held there until 1853, when a small brick church was constructed.

Inama also acquired 1,200 acres (4.9 km^{2}) of land in the area, 100 acres (0.40 km^{2}) of which had been donated by Haraszthy. Three acres were set aside for the construction of a church and a school. The remainder were sold to immigrants at cost, which was done to prevent speculators from preying on the naïve newcomers.

As an increasing number of settlers arrived, they called for their own local government, and in 1849 the area that is now the Town of Roxbury was detached from the Town of Dane (then known as Clarkson). The Town of Roxbury was formed by an act of the legislature on March 21, 1849. Burke Fairchild was elected the town's first chairman. In a vote held to select the town's name, two factions debated the issue. One wanted "Nelson", after Admiral Nelson, the hero of the English wife of the town chairman; another wanted "Roxbury", after a town in New York where some of the settlers originated. A tie vote resulted in the secretary casting the deciding ballot for Roxbury.

Although many of the first settlers of Roxbury were Yankees, Inama's work attracted an element that was heavily German. Within a short time, the original Yankee settlers moved on and Germans predominated. As the town grew, the small settlement of Alden's Corners developed in the southern part of the town, and at one time a post office was located there. By 1875 the population of the town had reached 1,151.

Having outgrown the church built only a few years earlier, a new one was constructed in 1857. Though it has been enlarged several times, the 1857 building remains at the core of the present church. Erected on a hill, the Romanesque Revival style church is a stately edifice overlooking a small settlement below. It is graced by a large altar painting depicting St. Norbert and the allegory of life, which was donated to Inama in 1860 by King Ludwig I of Bavaria.

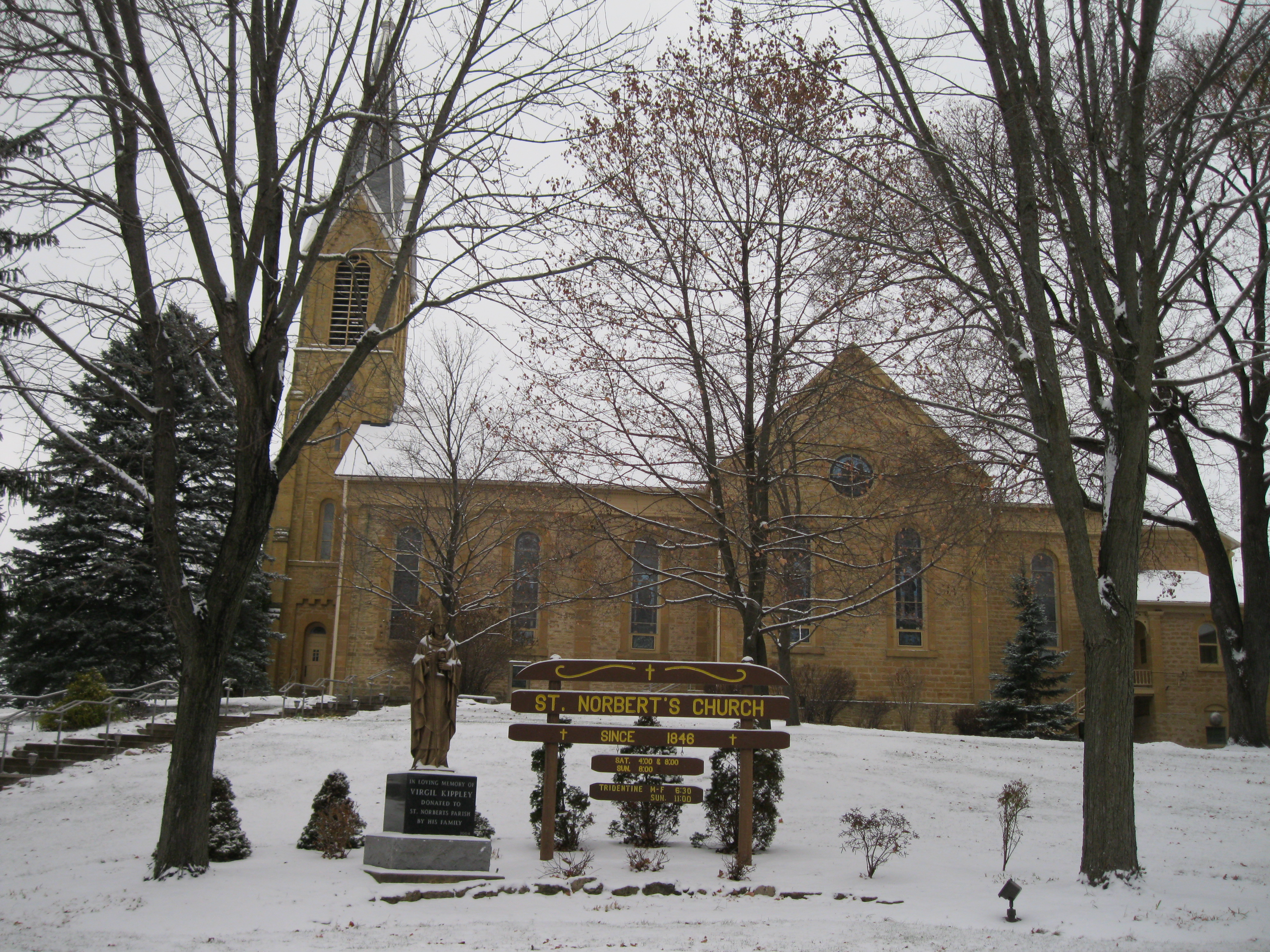
St. Norbert's Church

St. Norbert's Church has always been the centerpiece of the hamlet and focal point of the community. School was originally held in the basement of the church, until a separate school building was erected in 1864. A convent to house the Dominican nuns who ran the school was erected in 1879. The only settlement in the town is the hamlet of Roxbury, which is centered around the church. At one time, the hamlet consisted of the church, school, convent, a blacksmith shop, an auto garage, two stores, a meat market, and a handful of houses, but now only the church, the school, a restaurant, and a tavern remain, and the school is no longer in operation, with the exception being religious instruction twice weekly. The number of houses in the hamlet has been increasing since the 1970s.

Because Roxbury was populated almost exclusively by Germans, German was spoken in the community for over 80 years, well into the 1930s. Tradition has it that the Kelly family were the only ones in Roxbury who could not speak German. School classes at St. Norbert's were conducted in German until 1905, when they began to be taught half in German and half in English. For many years, the church also followed a German tradition of segregating the congregation during services, with men on one side and women on the other, married adults in the rear, single adults in the center, and children in the front. Local residents still refer to the hamlet of Roxbury as "the Dorf", German for village.

Given the proximity of the town to the city of Madison, concerns have been raised about development in the town. As a result, the town's most recent comprehensive plan addressed a number of issues, including growth and economic development; land use and preservation; agricultural, natural, and cultural resources; community facilities; and housing. The key goals that were identified by residents of the town of Roxbury and delineated in the plan were to preserve agricultural land and agriculture as a way of life, to preserve natural resources and wildlife, to preserve areas of cultural and historic importance, and to carefully site and design new development so as to maintain the existing character of the town.

== Geography ==
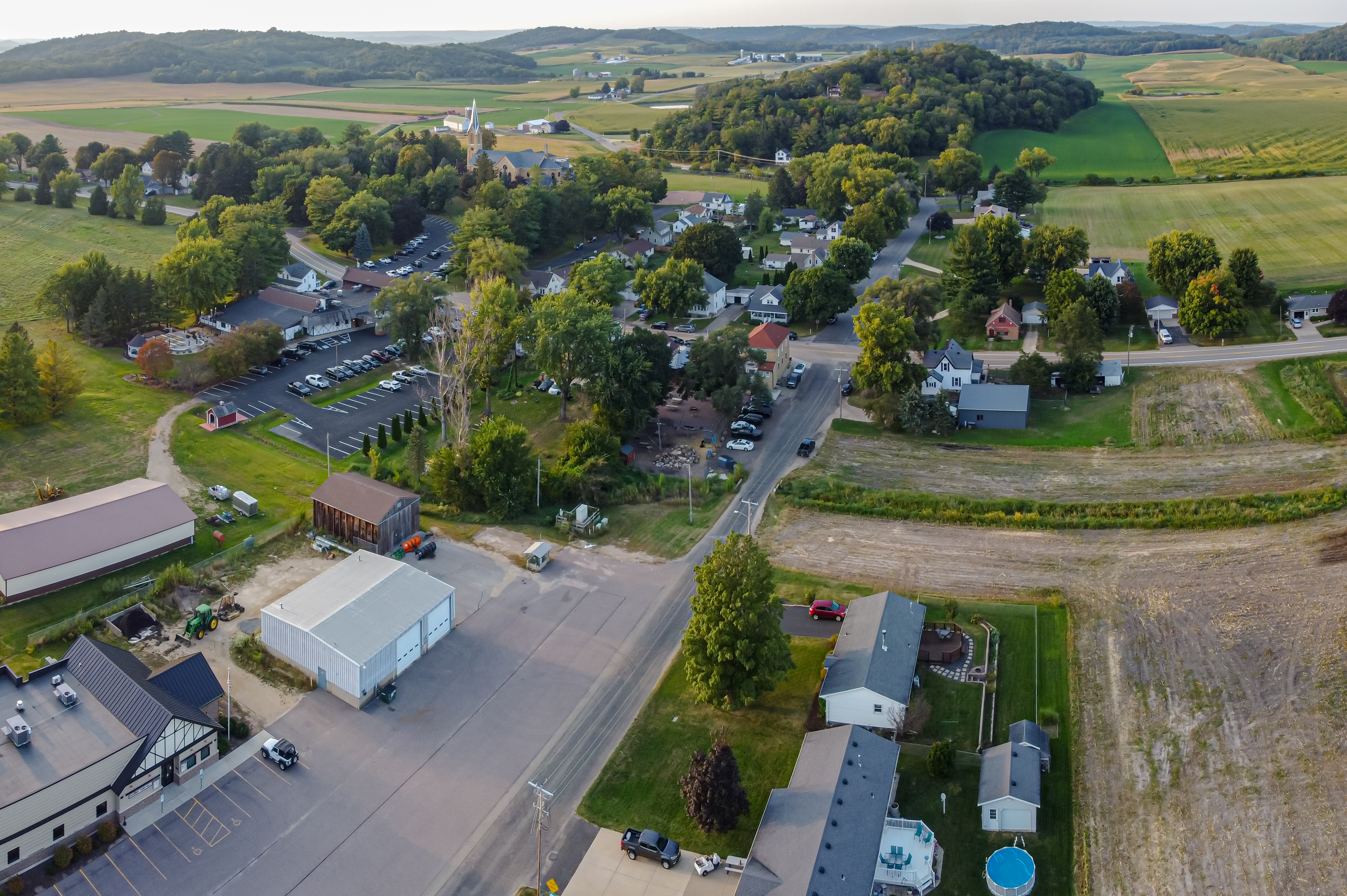
Roxbury, Wisconsin

According to the United States Census Bureau, the town has a total area of 35.9 square miles (93.0 km^{2}), of which 34.6 square miles (89.6 km^{2}) is land and 1.3 square miles (3.4 km^{2}) (3.65%) is water. The Town of Roxbury occupies Township 9 North, Range 7 East of the fourth principal meridian. The land in the Town of Roxbury is hilly, with high limestone bluffs in the west adjoining the Wisconsin River. Throughout the town, small areas of prairie are interspersed with oak groves. In the north lie several small lakes, including Crystal Lake and Fish Lake. Springs, ponds, and creeks also dot the area. Aside from the small hamlet of Roxbury, the town is agricultural. A vineyard, the successor to one founded by Agoston Haraszthy, lies in the northwest, overlooking the Wisconsin River.

== Demographics ==
As of the census of 2000, there were 1,700 people, 603 households, and 499 families residing in the town. The population density was 49.1 people per square mile (19.0/km^{2}). There were 640 housing units at an average density of 18.5 per square mile (7.1/km^{2}). The racial makeup of the town was 99.65% White, 0.12% Native American, 0.12% from other races, and 0.12% from two or more races. Hispanic or Latino of any race were 0.35% of the population.

There were 603 households, out of which 39.6% had children under the age of 18 living with them, 76.1% were married couples living together, 4.3% had a female householder with no husband present, and 17.2% were non-families. 14.9% of all households were made up of individuals, and 4.8% had someone living alone who was 65 years of age or older. The average household size was 2.80 and the average family size was 3.10.

The population was 28.4% under the age of 18, 4.9% from 18 to 24, 31.5% from 25 to 44, 25.4% from 45 to 64, and 9.9% who were 65 years of age or older. The median age was 38 years. For every 100 females, there were 111.2 males. For every 100 females age 18 and over, there were 108.6 males.

The median income for a household in the town was $60,463, and the median income for a family was $63,542. Males had a median income of $38,750 versus $29,118 for females. The per capita income for the town was $24,708. About 3.9% of families and 5.4% of the population were below the poverty line, including 8.3% of those under age 18 and 4.9% of those age 65 or over.

== Transportation ==
U.S. Highway 12 traverses the town, running northwest–southeast. Wisconsin Highways 78 and 188 parallel the Wisconsin River along the western edge of the town.

== Education ==
Most of the Town of Roxbury is served by the Sauk Prairie School District. A small southwestern portion of the town is in the Wisconsin Heights School District, while the northeast corner is in the Lodi School District.
