= Dane (town), Wisconsin =

Wisconsin town

Dane, Wisconsin
- Town
- Town of Dane
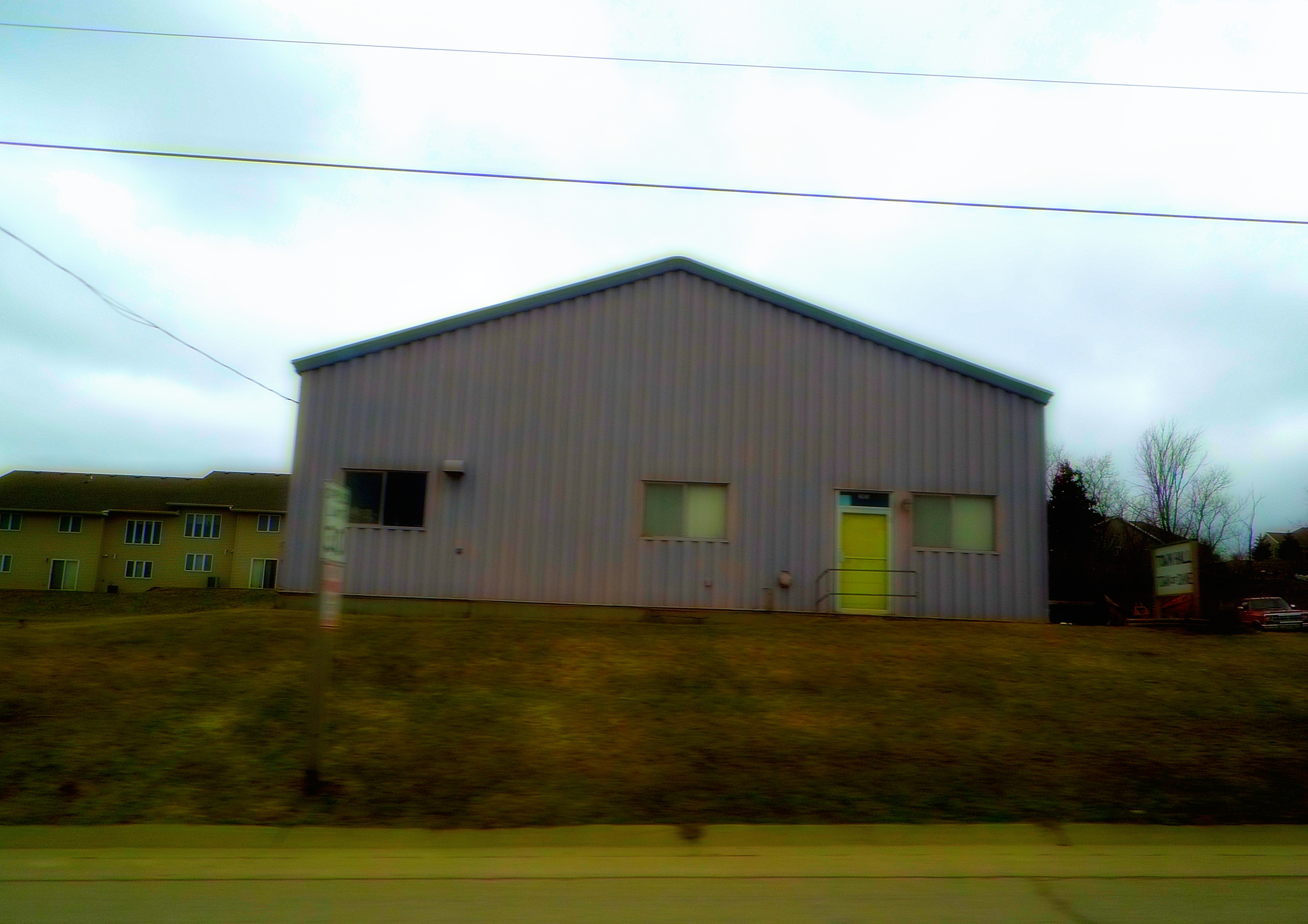
- Dane Town Hall

- Location in Dane County, Wisconsin
- Coordinates: 43°14′26″N 89°33′04″W
- Country: United States
- State: Wisconsin
- County: Dane

Area
  - Total: 35.0 sq mi (91 km^{2})
  - Land: 34.83 sq mi (90.2 km^{2})
  - Water: 0.16 sq mi (0.41 km^{2})

Population (2020)
  - Total: 934
  - Density: 26.8/sq mi (10.4/km^{2})
- Time zone: UTC-6 (Central (CST))
  - Summer (DST): UTC-5 (CDT)
- Area code(s): 608 and 353
- GNIS feature ID: 1583048
- Website: https://townofdane.gov/

Dane is a town in Dane County, Wisconsin, United States. The population was 934 at the 2020 census. The unincorporated community of Lutheran Hill is located partially in the town.

== Geography ==
According to the United States Census Bureau, the town has a total area of 35.1 square miles (90.9 km^{2}), of which 35.1 square miles (90.9 km^{2}) is land and 0.03% is water.

== Demographics ==
At the 2000 census there were 968 people, 335 households, and 271 families in the town. The population density was 27.6 people per square mile (10.6/km^{2}). There were 339 housing units at an average density of 9.7 per square mile (3.7/km^{2}). The racial makeup of the town was 98.76% White, 0.21% Native American, 0.52% Asian, 0.21% from other races, and 0.31% from two or more races. 0.52% of the population were Hispanic or Latino of any race.

Of the 335 households 39.1% had children under the age of 18 living with them, 74.3% were married couples living together, 2.1% had a female householder with no husband present, and 19.1% were non-families. 12.2% of households were one person and 6% were one person aged 65 or older. The average household size was 2.89 and the average family size was 3.2.

The age distribution was 29.1% under the age of 18, 6.7% from 18 to 24, 29.9% from 25 to 44, 23.8% from 45 to 64, and 10.5% 65 or older. The median age was 37 years. For every 100 females, there were 106 males. For every 100 females age 18 and over, there were 105.4 males.

The median household income was $61,250 and the median family income was $64,423. Males had a median income of $36,016 versus $32,679 for females. The per capita income for the town was $25,562. About 2.9% of families and 3.2% of the population were below the poverty line, including 3.2% of those under age 18 and 3.1% of those age 65 or over.

== Notable people ==
- Louis K. Luse, Wisconsin State Representative and lawyer, born in the town
