= Mazomanie (town), Wisconsin =

Mazomanie, Wisconsin
- Town
- Town of Mazomanie
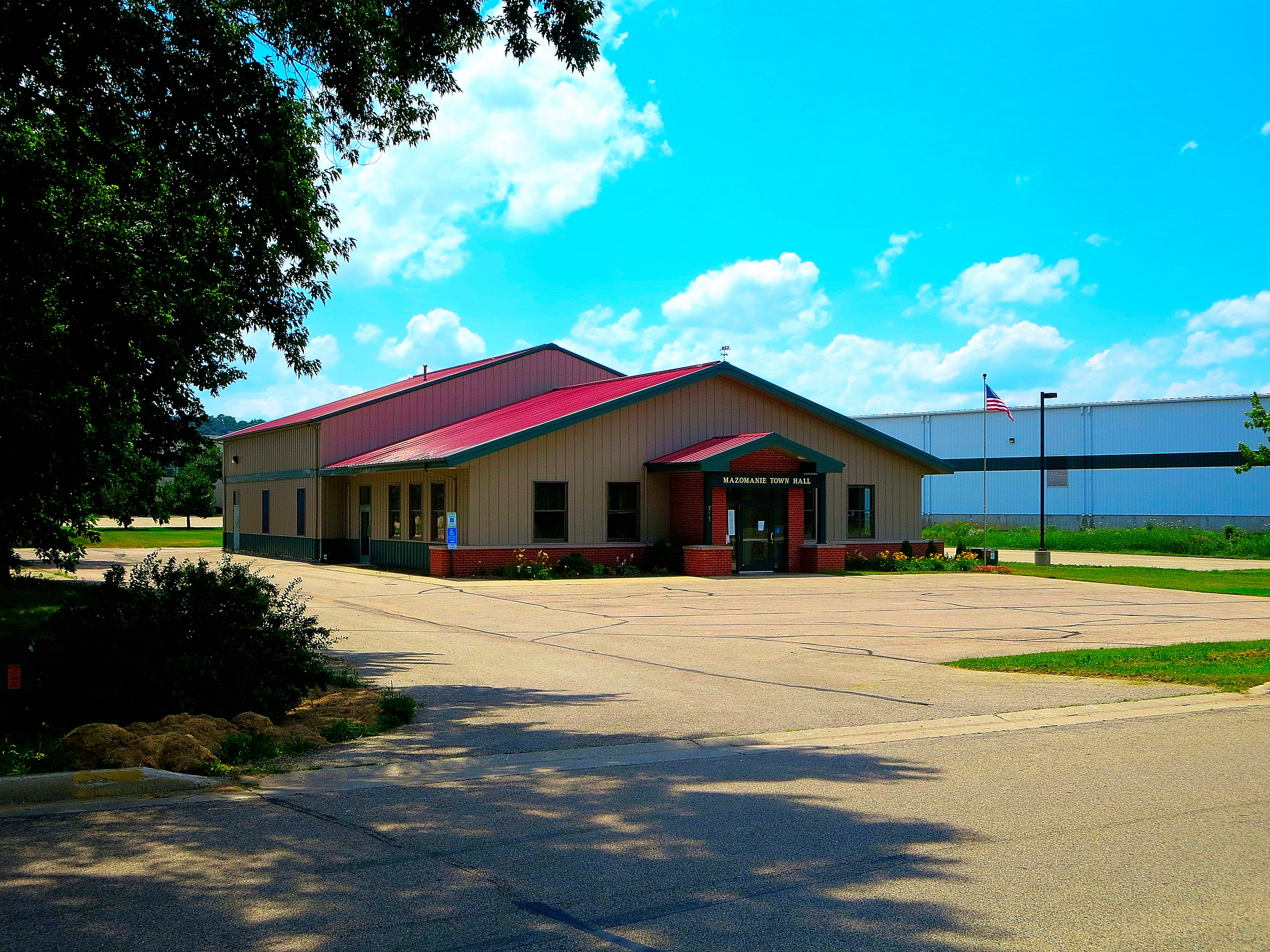
- Mazomanie Town Hall

- Location within Dane County, Wisconsin
- Coordinates: 43°12′02″N 89°46′03″W
- Country: United States
- State: Wisconsin
- County: Dane

Area
  - Total: 29.89 sq mi (77.4 km^{2})
  - Land: 29.10 sq mi (75.4 km^{2})
  - Water: 0.79 sq mi (2.0 km^{2})

Population (2020)
  - Total: 1,074
  - Density: 36.91/sq mi (14.25/km^{2})
- Time zone: UTC-6 (Central (CST))
  - Summer (DST): UTC-5 (CDT)
- Area code(s): 608 and 353
- GNIS feature ID: 1583678
- Website: https://www.townofmazomaniewi.gov/

Mazomanie is a town in Dane County, Wisconsin, United States. The population was 1,074 at the time of the 2020 census. The Village of Mazomanie is located within the town.

== Geography ==
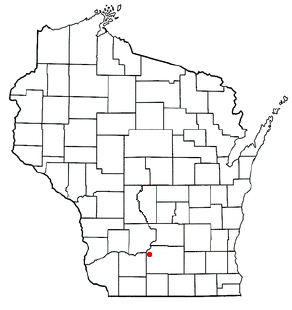
Map of Wisconsin, highlighting the Town of Mazomanie

According to the United States Census Bureau, the town has a total area of 31.0 square miles (80.3 km^{2}), of which 30.2 square miles (78.1 km^{2}) is land and 0.8 square mile (2.2 km^{2}) (2.71%) is water.

== Demographics ==
At the 2000 census there were 1,185 people, 437 households, and 340 families living in the town. The population density was 39.3 people per square mile (15.2/km^{2}). There were 466 housing units at an average density of 15.4 per square mile (6.0/km^{2}). The racial makeup of the town was 97.47% White, 0.08% Black or African American, 0.17% Native American, 0.08% Asian, 1.52% from other races, and 0.68% from two or more races. 2.19% of the population were Hispanic or Latino of any race. Of the 437 households 36.4% had children under the age of 18 living with them, 70.0% were married couples living together, 4.8% had a female householder with no husband present, and 22.0% were non-families. 16.0% of households were one person and 5.3% were one person aged 65 or older. The average household size was 2.71 and the average family size was 3.06.

The age distribution was 27.1% under the age of 18, 5.6% from 18 to 24, 33.0% from 25 to 44, 26.2% from 45 to 64, and 8.1% 65 or older. The median age was 38 years. For every 100 females, there were 97.8 males. For every 100 females age 18 and over, there were 101.4 males.

The median household income was $60,298 and the median family income was $65,125. Males had a median income of $37,150 versus $27,697 for females. The per capita income for the town was $24,001. About 1.1% of families and 1.4% of the population were below the poverty line, including 2.2% of those under age 18 and none of those age 65 or over.

== Attractions ==
- Mazo Beach
