= Middleton, Wisconsin (disambiguation) =

Middleton in the U.S. state of Wisconsin may refer to:

- Middleton, Wisconsin, a city
- Middleton (town), Wisconsin, a town
- Middleton Junction, Wisconsin, an unincorporated community
- West Middleton, Wisconsin, an unincorporated community
