= Isaac Adams (Wisconsin politician) =

American politician

Member of the Wisconsin State Assembly
- In office 1867–1867

Personal details
- Born: April 19, 1825 Vernon, New York
- Died: February 28, 1879 (aged 53) Cottage Grove, Wisconsin

Isaac Adams (April 19, 1825 – September 28, 1879) was an American farmer and politician.

Born in Vernon, New York, Adams moved to Wisconsin in 1853 and settled in Door Creek, Wisconsin, in the town of Cottage Grove in Dane County, Wisconsin, where he was a farmer. He served as a justice of the peace for the town and was an enrolling officer during the American Civil War. Adams served in the Wisconsin State Assembly in 1867 and 1875 as a Republican. He died at his home in Cottage Grove, Wisconsin.
