= William Fehlandt =

American politician

Member of the Wisconsin State Assembly
- In office 1888–1890

Personal details
- Born: Henry Frederick William Fehlandt; December 20, 1851 Picher, Germany
- Died: October 18, 1928 (aged 76) Madison, Wisconsin
- Party: Democratic

Henry Frederick William Fehlandt (December 20, 1851 – October 18, 1928) was a German-born American farmer, businessman, and politician.

== Biography ==
Born in Picher, Germany, Fehlandt emigrated to the United States and settled in the town of Roxbury, Dane County, Wisconsin in 1865. He married Frederica Reese in 1877. He was a farmer in the town of Berry, Wisconsin. He served on the Berry Town Board and was chairman of the town board. He also served on the Dane County Board of Supervisors.

In 1889, Fehllandt served in the Wisconsin State Assembly and was a Democrat. From 1891 to 1895, Fehlandt served as clerk of the Wisconsin Circuit Court for Dane County. He also served as jury commissioner for Dane County. In 1905, Fehlandt sold his farm and moved to Madison, Wisconsin. He was involved with the Dane County Agricultural Society and with the fire insurance business. Fehlandt was a Democrat.

Fehlandt died in Madison, Wisconsin.
