= St. Peter's Roman Catholic Church (Ashton, Wisconsin) =

Historic church in Wisconsin, United States

- U.S. National Register of Historic Places
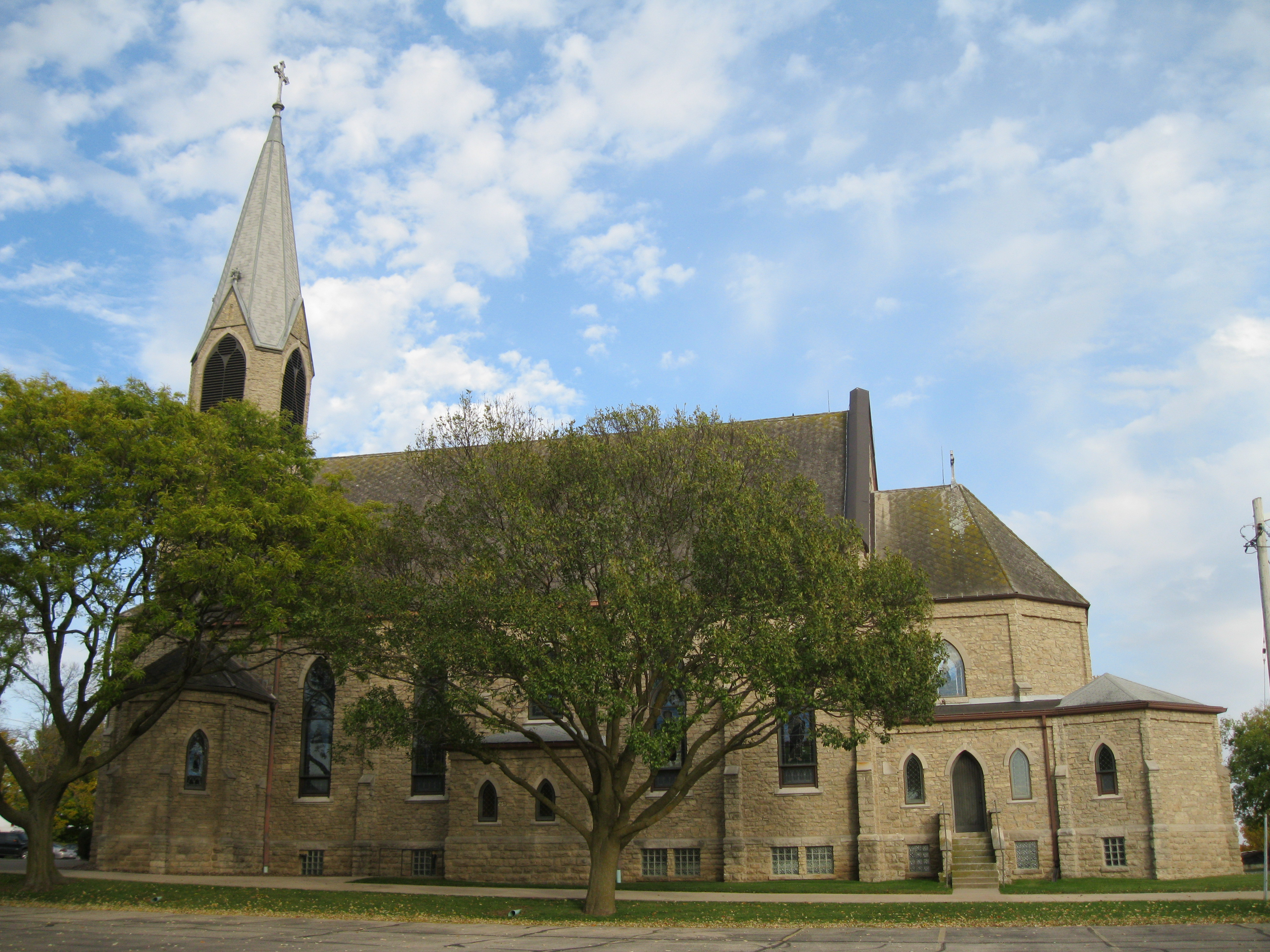

- Location within Wisconsin Location within the United States
- Location: County Highway K, Ashton, Wisconsin
- Coordinates: 43°8′23″N 89°32′27″W
- Area: 1.7 acres (0.69 ha)
- Built: 1901
- Architect: Anton Doham
- NRHP reference No.: 80000130
- Added to NRHP: September 23, 1980

St. Peter's Roman Catholic Church is a Neogothic-styled church built in 1901 in the small farming community of Ashton, Wisconsin in the town of Springfield, Dane County, Wisconsin. It was added to the National Register of Historic Places in 1980.

The first settler in the area around St. Peter's arrived in 1848, from Bavaria. In subsequent years, more immigrants arrived from Cologne and Alsace-Lorraine. Many of these people were German Catholics, and they established a local parish, constructing their first church building in 1861. In 1867 they added a Catholic school, which closed in 2024. The school building is now rented to a Catholic Montessori school named Divine Mercy Academy.

By 1901 the parish needed a new church building. Anton Dohman of Milwaukee designed the current building and J.H. Owens of Mazomanie contracted the masonry work. The walls are built of coursed limestone quarried from local farms. The front doors are at the base of a tall centered steeple. Above the door is a rose window, then three lancet windows, then a louvered belfry, then an octagonal spire, then a cross. Small apses project from the sides and a large apse from the back. Limestone buttresses divide the wall surfaces. The main roof is still covered by its original slate shingles.

Inside, the nave contains two rows of oak pews, leading to the pinnacled altar in the apse on the south end. In the spandrels above the altar is a mural depicting Christ and his disciples. To the sides are a carved wood pulpit and lecterns. One side apse contains a baptistery and the other a grotto.

The complex includes a two-story brick school/convent and a Queen Anne-styled rectory built in 1906, but neither building is included in the NRHP nomination.

St. Peter's school, built in 1867, was the only school in Ashton until a public school opened in 1920. Today the church building remains the only prominent building in the small community, and the steeple is visible for miles over the surrounding farmlands.

They are part of the Holy Cross Catholic Parish along with four other nearby churches in Middleton, Martinsville, Cross Plains, and Pine Bluff.
