= Henry M. Warner =

American politician

Henry M. Warner (1809 – April 7, 1875) was a member of the Wisconsin State Assembly.

== Biography ==
Warner was born in 1809 in Connecticut, lived in Cottage Grove, Wisconsin, and then moved to Black Earth. He died on April 7, 1875, at Black Earth.

== Career ==
Warner was a member of the Assembly during the 1st Wisconsin Legislature in 1848, representing the 1st District of Dane County, Wisconsin. Additionally, he was a member of the County Board and was an Overseer of the Poor.
