= Blackhawk Airfield =

- IATA: none; ICAO: none; FAA LID: 87Y

Summary
- Airport type: Public use
- Owner: Blackhawk Airfield Inc.
- Serves: Madison, Wisconsin
- Location: Cottage Grove, Wisconsin
- Opened: September 1972
- Time zone: CST (UTC−06:00)
  - Summer (DST): CDT (UTC−05:00)
- Elevation AMSL: 920 ft (280 m)
- Coordinates: 43°06′17″N 089°11′07″W

Map
- Location of airport in Wisconsin 87Y (the United States)

Runways
| Direction | Length | | Surface |
| Direction | ft | m | Surface |
|---|---|---|---|
| 4/22 | 2,814 | 858 | Asphalt |
| 9/27 | 2,203 | 671 | Asphalt |

Statistics
- Aircraft operations (2022): 2,000
- Based aircraft (2024): 34
- Source: Federal Aviation Administration

Blackhawk Airfield (FAA LID: 87Y) is a privately owned public use airport in Dane County, Wisconsin, United States. It is located 10 nautical miles (12 mi, 19 km) east of the central business district of Madison, near the village of Cottage Grove. This airport was included in the National Plan of Integrated Airport Systems for 2011–2015, which categorized it as a general aviation facility, but is not listed in the 2021–2025 NPIAS.

== Facilities and aircraft ==
Blackhawk Airfield covers an area of 27 acres (11 ha) at an elevation of 920 feet (280 m) above mean sea level. It has two runways with asphalt surfaces: the primary runway 4/22 is 2,814 by 57 feet (858 x 17 m) and the crosswind runway 9/27 is 2,203 by 56 feet (671 x 17 m).

For the 12-month period ending July 22, 2022, the airport had 2,000 aircraft operations, an average of 38 operations per week: 50% transient general aviation and 50% local general aviation. In July 2024, there were 34 aircraft based at this airport: all 34 single-engine.

== See also ==
- List of airports in Wisconsin
