= Henry G. Klinefelter =

American politician (1843–1910)

Member of the Wisconsin State Assembly from the Dane 4th district
- In office January 7, 1889 – January 5, 1891
- Preceded by: Henry Powell
- Succeeded by: William H. Porter

Personal details
- Born: October 22, 1843 Marion County, Ohio, U.S.
- Died: March 22, 1910 (aged 66) Madison, Wisconsin, U.S.
- Resting place: Liberty Prairie Cemetery, Nora, Wisconsin
- Party: Republican
- Spouses: Lydia Hoffman (died 1871); Frances A. Devoe (m. 1872–1910)
- Children: Emery G. Klinefelter^{(b. 1869; died 1869)}; Lillian M. (Arthur)^{(b. 1870; died 1942)}; Warren W. Klinefelter^{(b. 1874; died 1875)}; Roy A. Klinefelter^{(b. 1875; died 1876)}; Harlow Jay Klinefelter^{(b. 1877; died 1936)}; Maribel (Good)^{(b. 1879; died 1963)}; Barbara Hazel (Lange)^{(b. 1888; died 1965)}

Military service
- Allegiance: United States
- Branch/service: United States Volunteers; Union Army
- Years of service: 1861–1865
- Rank: 2nd Lieutenant, USV
- Unit: 7th Reg. Wis. Vol. Infantry; 51st Reg. Wis. Vol. Infantry
- Battles/wars: American Civil War: Overland Campaign; Battle of the Wilderness (WIA)

Henry Gracely Klinefelter (October 22, 1843 – March 22, 1910) was an American farmer and Republican politician. He served one term in the Wisconsin State Assembly, representing Dane County.

== Biography ==
Born in Marion County, Ohio, Klinefelter went to Mukwonago High School in Mukwonago, Wisconsin. In 1846, Klinefelter settled in the community of Nora, in the town of Cottage Grove, Dane County, Wisconsin Territory. Klinefelter was a farmer and tobacco buyer. During the American Civil War, Klinefelter served in Company D of the 7th Wisconsin Infantry Regiment, a part of the famous Iron Brigade, eventually being promoted to Second Lieutenant of the 51st Wisconsin Volunteer Infantry Regiment shortly before the end of the war. After the death of his first wife, Lydia Hoffman Klinefelter (1849–1871), Klinefelter married Frances A. Devoe (1849–1919) in 1872. Klinefelter served as justice of the peace and a census enumerator, and was a Republican. In 1889, Klinefelter served in the Wisconsin State Assembly. He died in Madison, Wisconsin.

Wisconsin State Assembly
Preceded by Henry Powell	Member of the Wisconsin State Assembly from the Dane 4th district January 7, 1889 – January 5, 1891	Succeeded by William H. Porter
