= John Ollis =

American politician (1839–1913)

John Ollis (March 23, 1839 – November 16, 1913) was an American farmer, lawyer, and politician.

Born in Bergen, Norway, Ollis emigrated with his parents to the United States in 1849 and settled in the town of Vienna, Dane County, Wisconsin. Ollis went the public schools and to University of Wisconsin and Luther College in Decorah, Iowa.. Ollis was a farmer. He served on the Vienna Town Board and was chairman of the town board. He also served as the Vienna Town Assessor. In 1878, Ollis served in the Wisconsin State Assembly and was a Republican. In 1884, Ollis graduated from the University of Wisconsin Law School and practiced law in Madison, Wisconsin. He died at his home in Madison, Wisconsin.
