= Monona Grove School District =

School District in Wisconsin, United States

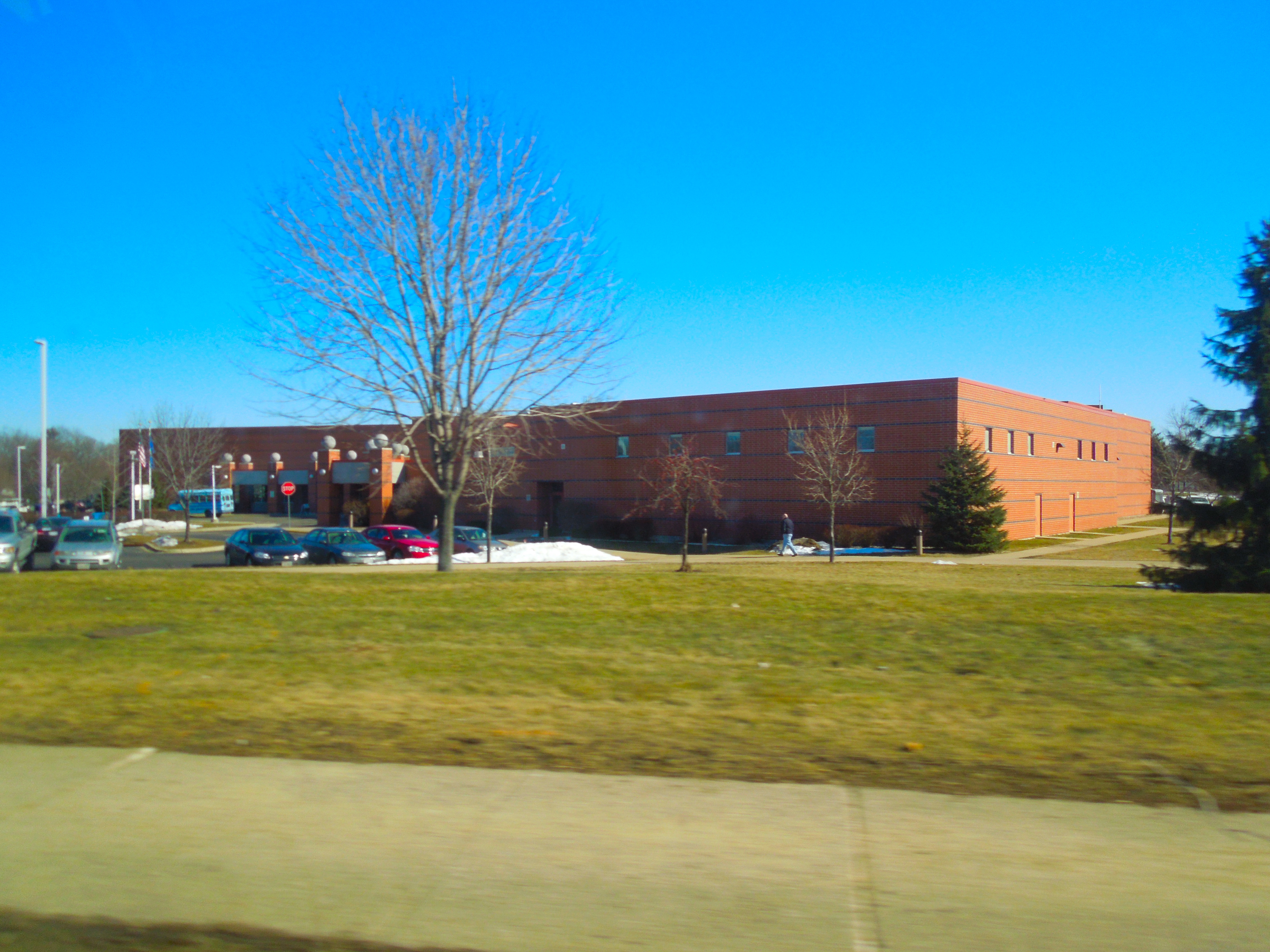
- Monona Grove High School

Address
- 5301 Monona Drive Monona, Dane County, Wisconsin, 53716-3126; United States
- Coordinates: 43.061°N 89.326°W

District information
- Type: Public
- Grades: Pre-K/K–12
- School board: Seven members
- Schools: Elementary four, Middle one, High two
- NCES District ID: 5509810

Students and staff
- Students: 3,696 (2023-2024)
- Staff: 561.20 (FTE, 2023-2024)
- Student–teacher ratio: 12.37

Other information
- Website: www.mononagrove.org

The Monona Grove School District is a school district based in the city of Monona, Wisconsin. It serves the city of Monona and the village of Cottage Grove, Wisconsin. Monona Grove has a seven-member Board of Education that governs the district and selects the superintendent. The district administers four elementary schools, one middle school, and two high school, for a total of seven schools.

== Schools ==
| School | Year built | Description |
|---|---|---|
| Monona Grove High School | 1999 | Located in Monona, serves both communities in grades 9-12. |
| MG21 Charter School | 2010 | Charter school in Monona that serves both communities in grades 6-12. |
| Glacial Drumlin School | 2008 | Located in Cottage Grove, serves both communities in grades 6-8. |
| Cottage Grove School | | Located in Cottage Grove, serves its community in grades 1-2. |
| Granite Ridge School | | Located in Cottage Grove, serves its community in grades 3-5. |
| Taylor Prairie School | | Located in Cottage Grove, serves its community in grades 4K-K. |
| Winnequah School | 1963 | Located in Monona, serves its community in grades 4K-5. |
