= Hiland J. Spaulding =

American politician and businessman

Hiland J. Spaulding (October 16, 1841 – December 26, 1927) was an American politician and businessman.

Born in Ludlow, Vermont, Spaulding's family moved to the town of Token Creek, Dane County, Wisconsin in 1853. He then settled in the town of Vienna, Wisconsin and was a farmer. He married Cornelia Farwell in 1862. During the American Civil War, Spaulding served in the 1st Wisconsin Volunteer Infantry Regiment and served for six months. He served as chairman and as town supervisor on the Windsor Town Board. He also served as postmaster for the town of Windsor, Wisconsin. In 1895, Spaulding served in the Wisconsin State Assembly and was a Republican. Spaulding died at his son's home in Riverside, California, and he was buried in Windsor, Wisconsin.
