= Bernard Esser =

American politician

Bernard Esser (May 5, 1840 – August 20, 1901) was an American farmer, businessman, and politician.

Born in Kerpen, Kingdom of Prussia, Esser emigrated to the United States in 1855 and settled in the town of Springfield, Dane County, Wisconsin. Esser was a farmer and a dealer in farm equipment. He served as Springfield town clerk, town assessor, and town treasurer. In 1883, Esser served in the Wisconsin State Assembly and was a Democrat. While in the Assembly, Esser served on the public lands committee. Esser also served as Dane County Clerk of Circuit Court in 1874 and 1876 and also served on the Dane County Board of Supervisors. Esser died from a stroke at his home in the town of Springfield, Wisconsin.
