= Norway Grove, Wisconsin =

- Unincorporated community
- Location within Wisconsin Location within the United States
- Coordinates: 43°14′55″N 89°24′09″W
- Country: United States
- State: Wisconsin
- County: Dane County
- Town: Vienna
- Elevation: 991 ft (302 m)
- Time zone: UTC-6 (Central (CST))
  - Summer (DST): UTC-5 (CDT)
- Area code: 608
- GNIS feature ID: 1577757

Norway Grove is an unincorporated community located in the town of Vienna in Dane County, Wisconsin, United States.

Dating from 1844, immigrant settlers principally from the traditional district of Sogn in Western Norway, came to the townships of Windsor and Vienna in Dane County. They settled in a region lying in the northwestern part of Windsor township and the adjoining portion of the township of Vienna which became known as Norway Grove. In 1847, these settlers invited Rev. Johannes Wilhelm Christian Dietrichson from Koshkonong, Wisconsin to come and conduct worship services. In 1849, it was decided that they would organize a Norwegian language Lutheran Church congregation.

== Related reading ==
- Gjerde, Jon (1989) From Peasants to Farmers: The Migration from Balestrand, Norway, to the Upper Middle West (Cambridge University Press) ISBN 9780521368223
