= Ashton, Wisconsin =

- Unincorporated community
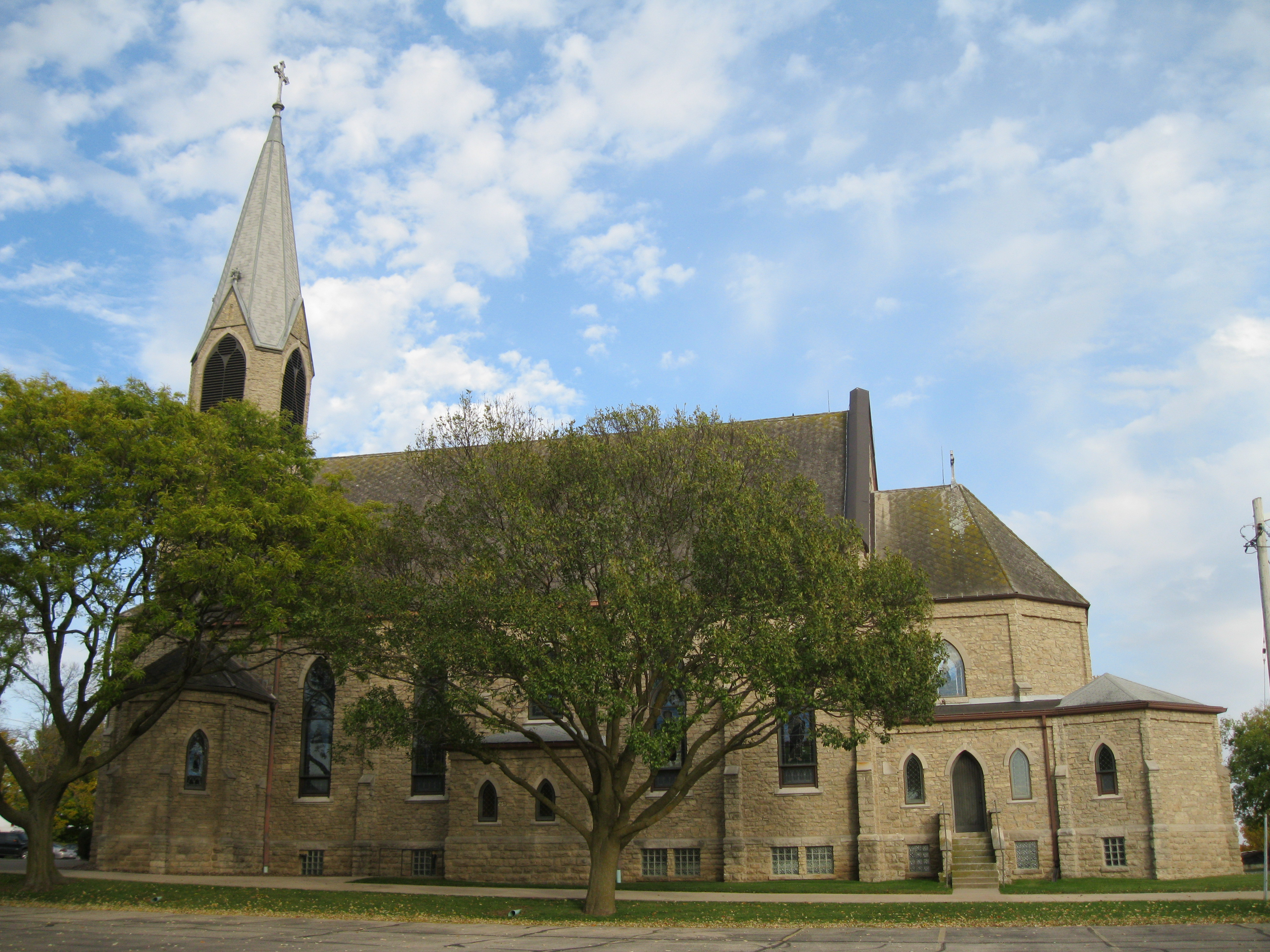
- St. Peter's Roman Catholic Church

- Location within Wisconsin Location within the United States
- Coordinates: 43°08′26″N 89°32′29″W
- Country: United States
- State: Wisconsin
- County: Dane
- Town: Springfield
- Elevation: 1,001 ft (305 m)
- Time zone: UTC-6 (Central (CST))
  - Summer (DST): UTC-5 (CDT)
- Area code: 608
- GNIS feature ID: 1560983

Ashton is an unincorporated community located in the town of Springfield, in Dane County, Wisconsin, United States. The community was named after Thomas Ashton, the president of the British Temperance Emigration Society.

St. Peter's Roman Catholic Church in Ashton is listed on the National Register of Historic Places.

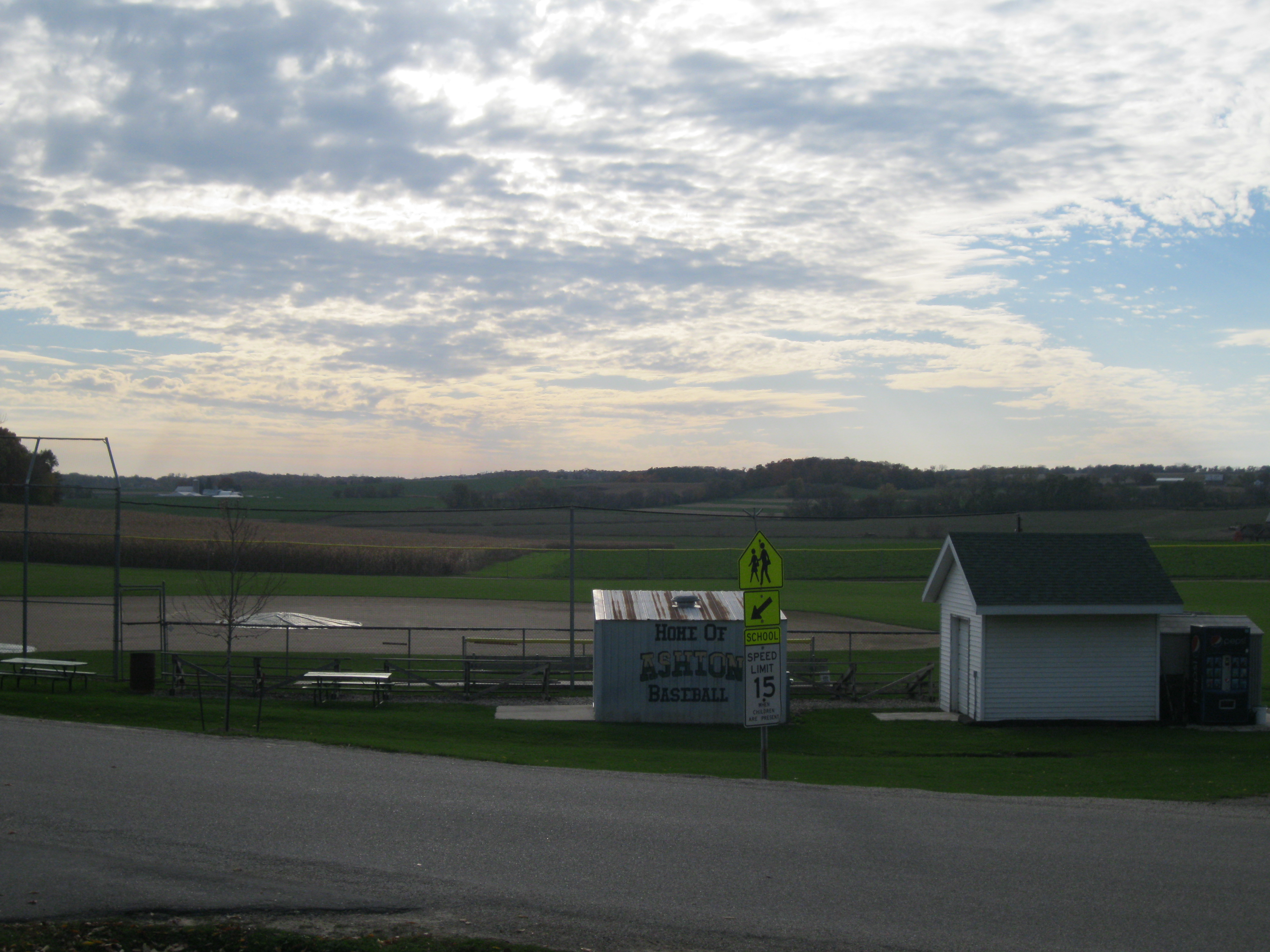
Baseball diamond in Ashton
