= Marxville, Wisconsin =

- Unincorporated community
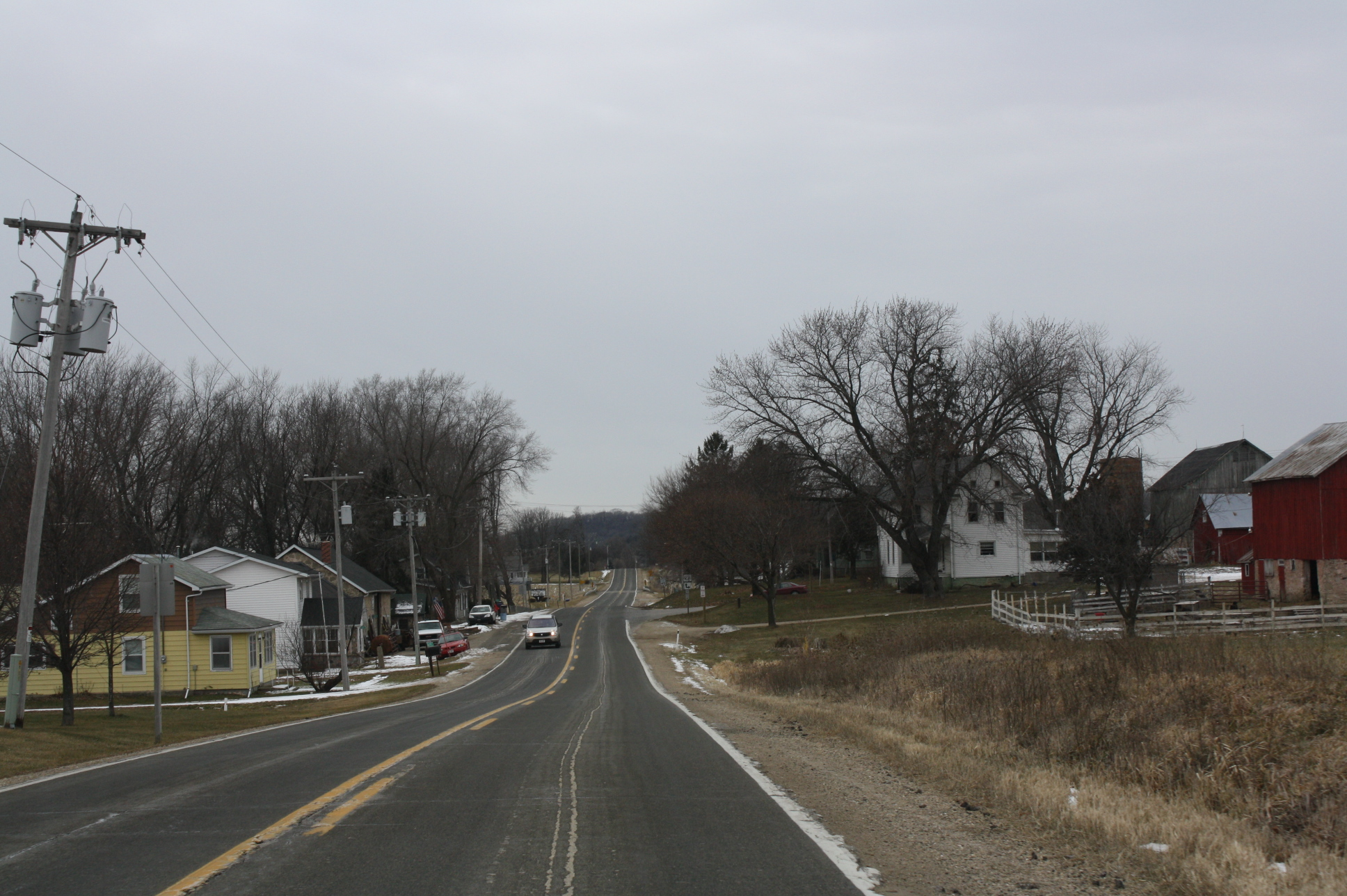
- Downtown Marxville

- Location within Wisconsin Location within the United States
- Coordinates: 43°11′28″N 89°39′35″W
- Country: United States
- State: Wisconsin
- County: Dane County
- Town: Berry
- Elevation: 902 ft (275 m)
- Time zone: UTC-6 (Central (CST))
  - Summer (DST): UTC-5 (CDT)
- Area code: 608
- GNIS feature ID: 1569101

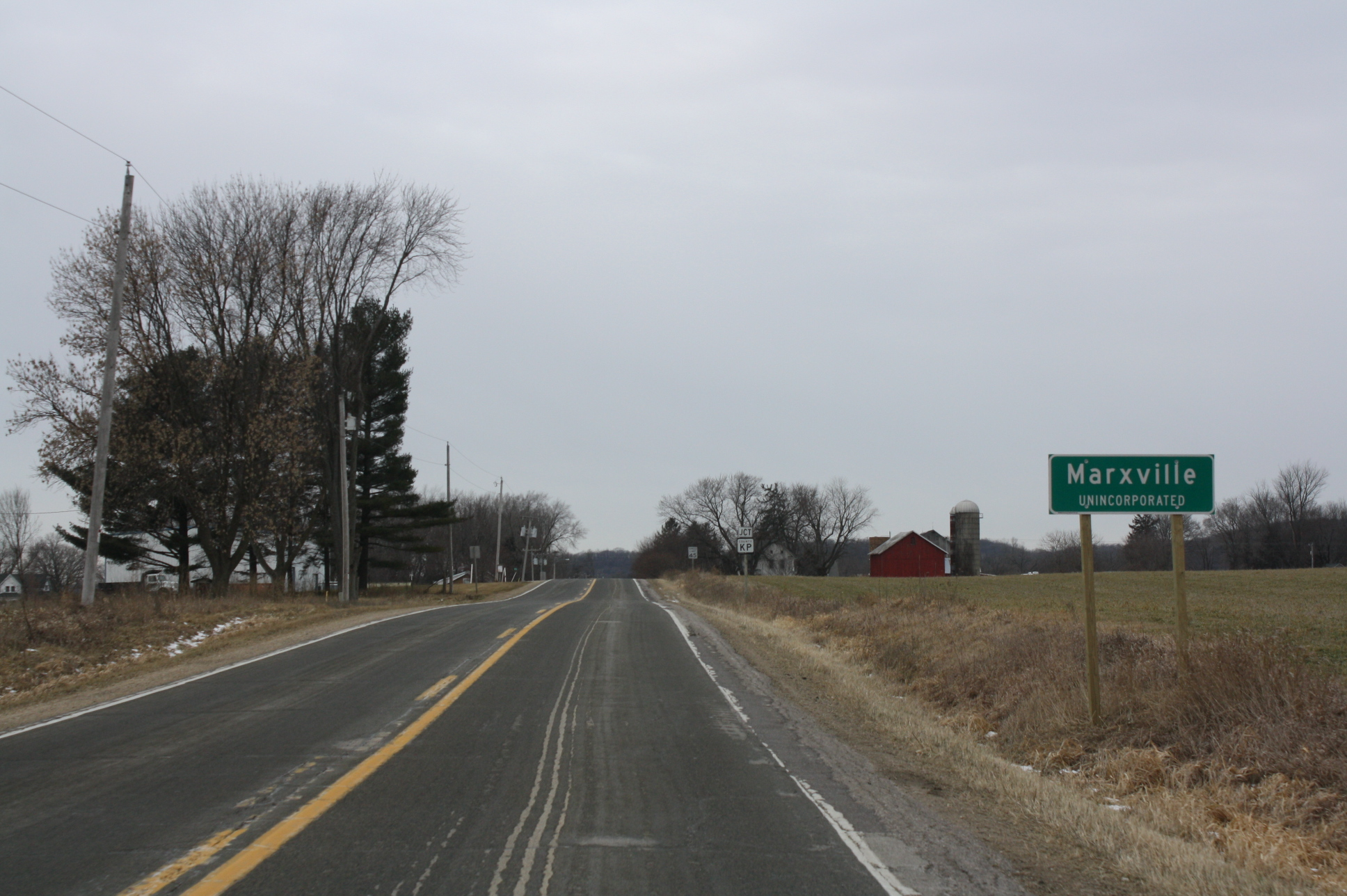
The sign for Marxville

Marxville is an unincorporated community located in the town of Berry in Dane County, Wisconsin, United States. The community is named after the Marx family, who settled in the community in the 19th century.

The Town of Berry newsletter wrote, "Marxville (formerly Halfway Prairie) served as the town's commercial center, boasting a store, several blacksmith shops and other establishments. Marxville is believed to be named after a German immigrant, Johann Marx, who, although not the area's first settler, was one of the largest landowners. The name is said to have been decided when the resourceful Mr. Marx showed up at the settlers' feast with a barrel of beer."
