= Nora, Wisconsin =

- Unincorporated community
- Location within Wisconsin Location within the United States
- Coordinates: 43°01′51″N 89°09′00″W
- Country: United States
- State: Wisconsin
- County: Dane County
- Town: Cottage Grove
- Elevation: 955 ft (291 m)
- Time zone: UTC-6 (Central (CST))
  - Summer (DST): UTC-5 (CDT)
- Area code: 608
- GNIS feature ID: 1577750

Nora is an unincorporated community located in the town of Cottage Grove, Dane County, Wisconsin, United States. Nora is located on U.S. routes 12 and 18, 4 miles (6.4 km) west-southwest of Deerfield. Nora has existed since at least 1877, at which time it had a post office with tri-weekly mail service.

== Notable people ==
- Henry G. Klinefelter, farmer and politician, lived in Nora.
