= Berry, Wisconsin =

- Town
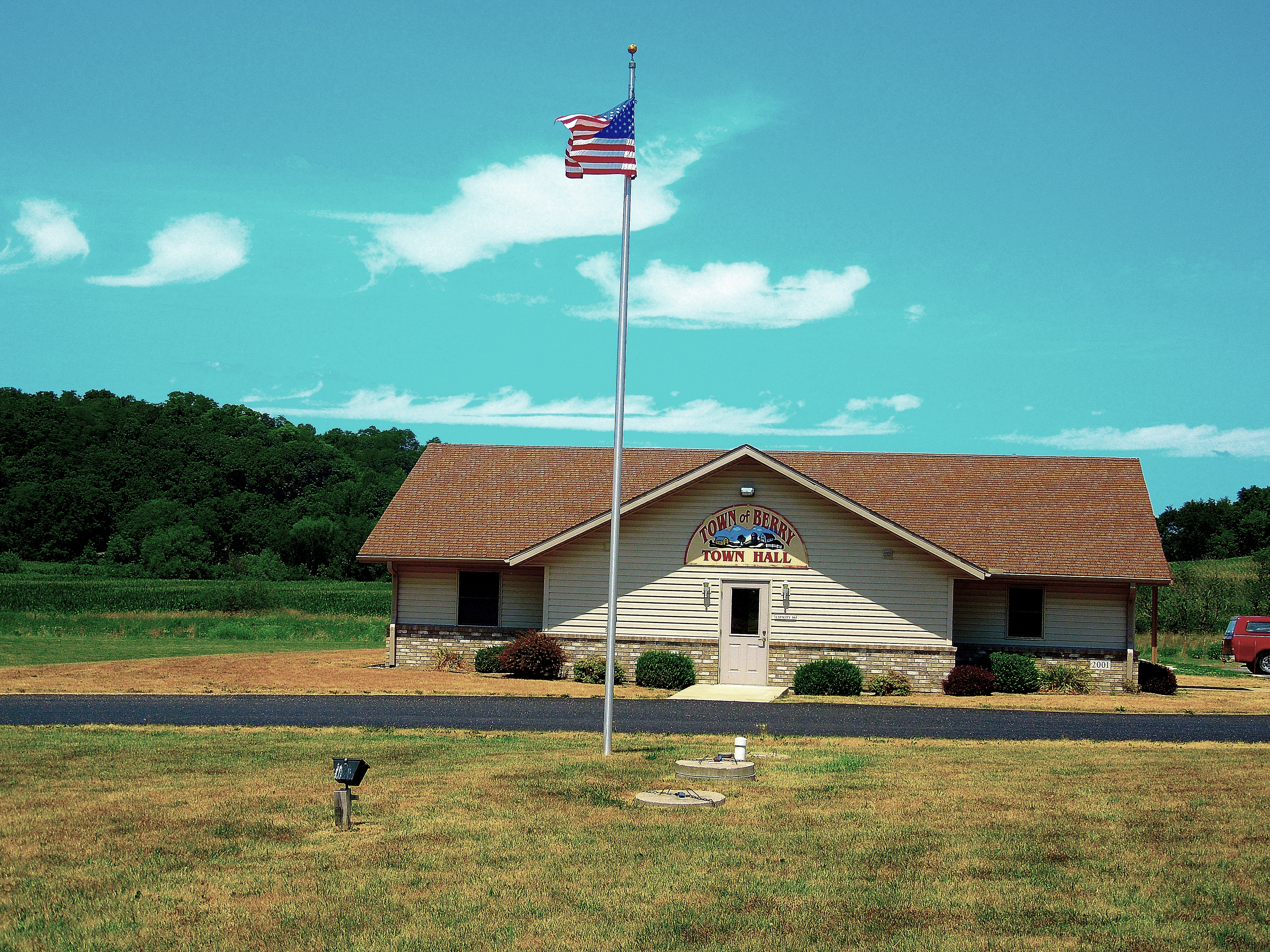
- Berry Town Hall

- Location in Dane County and the state of Wisconsin.
- Coordinates: 43°9′30″N 89°39′56″W
- Country: United States
- State: Wisconsin
- County: Dane

Area
  - Total: 36.0 sq mi (93.2 km^{2})
  - Land: 35.9 sq mi (92.9 km^{2})
  - Water: 0.12 sq mi (0.3 km^{2})
- Elevation: 915 ft (279 m)

Population (2020)
  - Total: 1,168
  - Density: 30/sq mi (11.7/km^{2})
- Time zone: UTC-6 (Central (CST))
  - Summer (DST): UTC-5 (CDT)
- Area code: 608
- FIPS code: 55-07025
- GNIS feature ID: 1582803

Berry is a town in Dane County, Wisconsin, United States. The population was 1,168 at the 2020 census. The unincorporated community of Marxville is in the Town of Berry.

== History ==
The Town of Berry was established on January 7, 1850, by being split off from Farmersville. It was probably named for Berry Haney, who kept a tavern in the 1830s and was the first postmaster of the Cross Plains post office in 1838.

== Geography ==
According to the United States Census Bureau, the town has a total area of 36.0 square miles (93.2 km^{2}), of which 35.8 square miles (92.9 km^{2}) is land and 0.1 square mile (0.3 km^{2}) (0.33%) is water.

== Demographics ==
As of the census of 2000, there were 1,084 people, 408 households, and 326 families residing in the town. The population density was 30.2 people per square mile (11.7/km^{2}). There were 420 housing units at an average density of 11.7 per square mile (4.5/km^{2}). The racial makeup of the town was 98.34% White, 0.09% African American, 0.09% Asian, 0.09% from other races, and 1.38% from two or more races. Hispanic or Latino of any race were 1.01% of the population.

There were 408 households, out of which 34.3% had children under the age of 18 living with them, 72.3% were married couples living together, 3.9% had a female householder with no husband present, and 19.9% were non-families. 15.7% of all households were made up of individuals, and 4.9% had someone living alone who was 65 years of age or older. The average household size was 2.66 and the average family size was 2.98.

In the town, the population was spread out, with 25.1% under the age of 18, 5.1% from 18 to 24, 27.2% from 25 to 44, 33.4% from 45 to 64, and 9.2% who were 65 years of age or older. The median age was 42 years. For every 100 females, there were 104.9 males. For every 100 females age 18 and over, there were 103.5 males.

The median income for a household in the town was $61,429, and the median income for a family was $68,906. Males had a median income of $43,125 versus $29,250 for females. The per capita income for the town was $27,194. About 0.7% of families and 1.2% of the population were below the poverty line, including none of those under the age of eighteen or sixty-five or over.

== Notable people ==
- William Fehlandt (1851–1928), farmer, businessman, and Wisconsin State Assemblyman, lived in the town; Fehlandt served as chairman of the Berry Town Board
