= Middleton (town), Wisconsin =

Middleton, Wisconsin
- Town
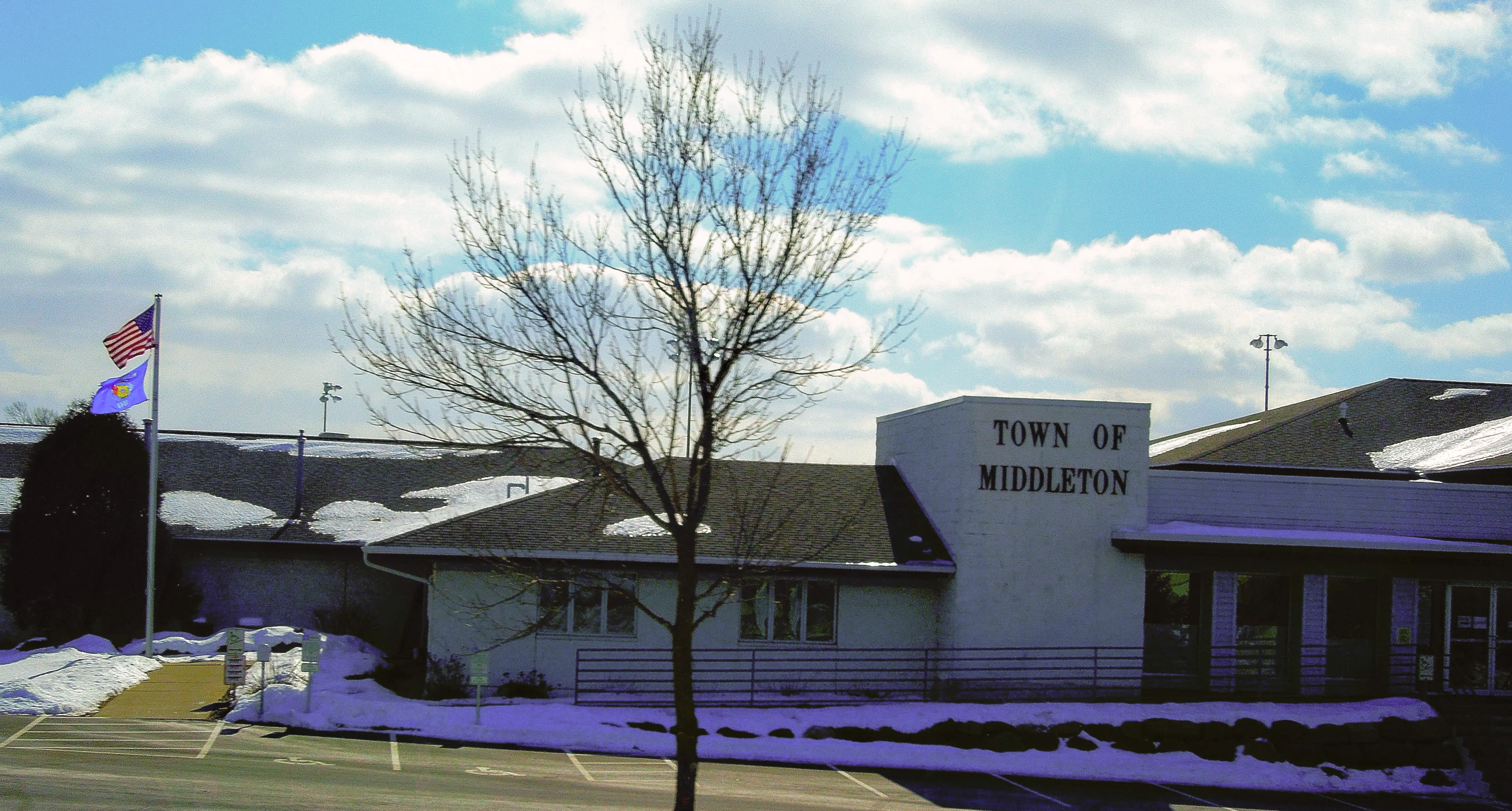
- Town hall

- Location in Dane County and the state of Wisconsin.
- Coordinates: 43°4′21″N 89°33′26″W
- Country: United States
- State: Wisconsin
- County: Dane

Government
  - Town Board Chair: Cynthia Richson

Area
  - Total: 17.7 sq mi (45.8 km^{2})
  - Land: 17.7 sq mi (45.8 km^{2})
  - Water: 0 sq mi (0.0 km^{2})
- Elevation: 1,122 ft (342 m)

Population (2020)
  - Total: 6,792
  - Density: 260/sq mi (100.3/km^{2})
- Time zone: UTC-6 (Central (CST))
  - Summer (DST): UTC-5 (CDT)
- Area code: 608
- FIPS code: 55-51600
- GNIS feature ID: 1583712

The Town of Middleton is located in Dane County, Wisconsin, United States. The Town of Middleton borders the cities of Middleton and Madison on the east. The population was 6,792 at the 2020 census. The unincorporated community of West Middleton is located in the town.

The town of Middleton is in the process of incorporation into the new village of West Middleton.

== Geography ==
According to the United States Census Bureau, the town has a total area of 17.7 square miles (45.8 km^{2}), all land.

=== Adjacent municipalities ===
- City of Middleton (east-northeast)
- City of Madison (east)
- Town of Springfield (north)
- Town of Cross Plains (west)
- Town of Verona (south)

== Demographics ==
As of the census of 2000, there were 4,594 people, 1,572 households, and 1,317 families residing in the town. The population density was 259.8 people per square mile (100.3/km^{2}). There were 1,610 housing units at an average density of 91.0 per square mile (35.1/km^{2}). The racial makeup of the town was 97.78% White, 0.37% Black or African American, 0.17% Native American, 0.78% Asian, 0.17% from other races, and 0.72% from two or more races. 0.70% of the population were Hispanic or Latino of any race.

There were 1,572 households, out of which 44.7% had children under the age of 18 living with them, 77.3% were married couples living together, 4.1% had a female householder with no husband present, and 16.2% were non-families. 11.6% of all households were made up of individuals, and 3.2% had someone living alone who was 65 years of age or older. The average household size was 2.90 and the average family size was 3.17.

The population was 29.9% under the age of 18, 4.8% from 18 to 24, 27.4% from 25 to 44, 30.8% from 45 to 64, and 7.1% who were 65 years of age or older. The median age was 40 years. For every 100 females, there were 99.7 males. For every 100 females age 18 and over, there were 96.5 males.

The median income for a household in the town was $93,008, and the median income for a family was $103,940. Males had a median income of $65,750 versus $36,282 for females. The per capita income for the town was $46,214. About 0.3% of families and 0.7% of the population were below the poverty line, including 0.6% of those under age 18 and none of those age 65 or over.

== Notable people ==
- George Reinke, first elected County Executive of Dane County
- Jim Troupis, indicted for 2020 fake presidential elector conspiracy in Wisconsin; former Dane County circuit judge
