= Deansville, Wisconsin =

- Unincorporated community
- Location within Wisconsin Location within the United States
- Coordinates: 43°10′54″N 89°06′12″W
- Country: United States
- State: Wisconsin
- County: Dane County
- Town: Medina
- Elevation: 879 ft (268 m)

Population
  - Total: 6,225
- Time zone: UTC-6 (Central (CST))
  - Summer (DST): UTC-5 (CDT)
- Area code: 608
- GNIS feature ID: 1563788

Deansville is an unincorporated community located in the town of Medina, Dane County, Wisconsin, United States.

== History ==
The community was named for Richard Dean, who became the first postmaster in 1860.
