= Hoffman Corners, Wisconsin =

- Unincorporated community
- Location within Wisconsin Location within the United States
- Coordinates: 43°01′18″N 89°09′00″W
- Country: United States
- State: Wisconsin
- County: Dane County
- Towns: Cottage Grove, Pleasant Springs
- Elevation: 948 ft (289 m)
- Time zone: UTC-6 (Central (CST))
  - Summer (DST): UTC-5 (CDT)
- Area code: 608
- GNIS feature ID: 1842466

Hoffman Corners is an unincorporated community in the towns of Cottage Grove and Pleasant Springs, Dane County, Wisconsin, United States. Hoffman Corners was named for its first postmaster, Gilbert Hoffman, who opened the community's post office in 1857.
