= Hope, Dane County, Wisconsin =

Hope, Wisconsin
- Unincorporated community
- Location within Wisconsin Location within the United States
- Coordinates: 43°03′06″N 89°14′46″W
- Country: United States
- State: Wisconsin
- County: Dane
- Elevation: 863 ft (263 m)
- Time zone: UTC-6 (Central (CST))
  - Summer (DST): UTC-5 (CDT)
- Area code: 608
- GNIS feature ID: 1566678

Hope was an unincorporated community, now a neighborhood, located in the former town of Blooming Grove and Cottage Grove in Dane County, Wisconsin, United States. Hope, as of 2020, lay partially within the city of Madison, making it a neighborhood rather than an unincorporated community. Hope does still extend into the unincorporated town of Cottage Grove.
