= Medina, Wisconsin =

- Town
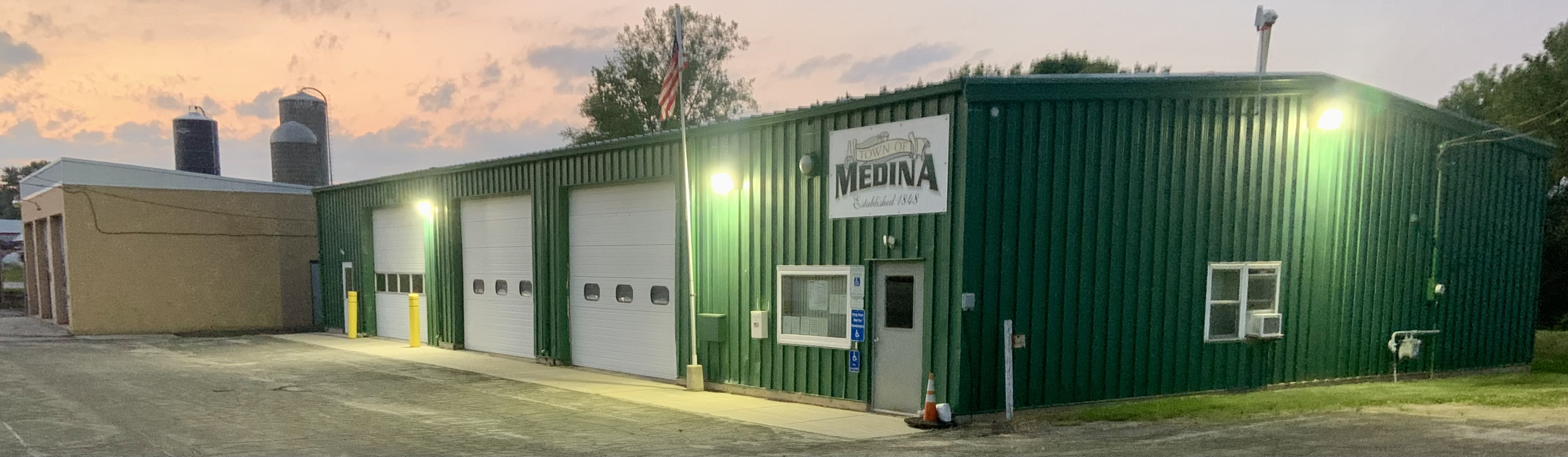
- Town hall

- Location in Dane County and the state of Wisconsin.
- Coordinates: 43°9′33″N 89°3′47″W
- Country: United States
- State: Wisconsin
- County: Dane

Government
  - Type: Unincorporated Town

Area
  - Total: 33.8 sq mi (87.6 km^{2})
  - Land: 33.6 sq mi (86.9 km^{2})
  - Water: 0.27 sq mi (0.7 km^{2})
- Elevation: 866 ft (264 m)

Population (2020)
  - Total: 1,344
  - Density: 40.1/sq mi (15.5/km^{2})
- Time zone: UTC-6 (Central (CST))
  - Summer (DST): UTC-5 (CDT)
- ZIP codes: 53559
- Area code(s): 608/353, 920/274
- FIPS code: 55-50475
- GNIS feature ID: 1583685
- Website: https://townofmedina.wi.gov/

Medina is a town in Dane County, Wisconsin, United States. The population was 1,344 at the 2020 census. The unincorporated community of Deansville is located in the town.

== Geography ==
According to the United States Census Bureau, the town has a total area of 33.8 square miles (87.6 km^{2}), of which 33.5 square miles (86.9 km^{2}) is land and 0.3 square mile (0.8 km^{2}) (0.86%) is water.

== Demographics ==
At the 2000 census there were 1,235 people, 447 households, and 362 families living in the town. The population density was 36.8 people per square mile (14.2/km^{2}). There were 452 housing units at an average density of 13.5 per square mile (5.2/km^{2}). The racial makeup of the town was 95.06% White, 0.57% African American, 0.32% Asian, 3.56% from other races, and 0.49% from two or more races. Hispanic or Latino of any race were 7.61%.

Of the 447 households, 38.0% had children under the age of 18 living with them, 72.5% were married couples living together, 5.4% had a female householder with no husband present, and 19.0% were non-families. 14.1% of households were one person and 5.4% were one person aged 65 or older. The average household size was 2.76 and the average family size was 3.07.

The age distribution was 27.4% under the age of 18, 6.5% from 18 to 24, 28.4% from 25 to 44, 27.4% from 45 to 64, and 10.2% were 65 or older. The median age was 38 years. For every 100 females, there were 103.8 males. For every 100 females age 18 and over, there were 106.9 males.

The median household income was $65,250 and the median family income was $66,685. Males had a median income of $38,162 versus $28,375 for females. The per capita income for the town was $27,027. About 5.4% of families and 5.5% of the population were below the poverty line, including 7.3% of those under age 18 and 6.9% of those age 65 or over.

== Transportation ==
=== Ground transportation ===
==== State highways ====
Wisconsin Highway 19
Wisconsin Highway 19 runs east–west from Mazomanie to Watertown Wisconsin.

Wisconsin Highway 73
Wisconsin Highway 73 runs north–south across central Wisconsin from Ingram to Edgerton.

=== Air transportation ===
==== Airfields ====
Mathaire Field, Marshall, Wisconsin, a 2800 ft grass landing strip privately owned and operated for single engine and ultralight vehicles.
