= Kingsley Corners, Wisconsin =

- Unincorporated community
- Location within Wisconsin Location within the United States
- Coordinates: 43°10′38″N 89°29′47″W
- Country: United States
- State: Wisconsin
- County: Dane County
- Town: Springfield
- Elevation: 965 ft (294 m)
- Time zone: UTC-6 (Central (CST))
  - Summer (DST): UTC-5 (CDT)
- Area code: 608
- GNIS feature ID: 1842488

Kingsley Corners is an unincorporated community in the town of Springfield, Dane County, Wisconsin, United States. It is located at the corner of Kingsley Road and Woodland Drive, just west of the Village of Waunakee. The community is named for Saxton P. Kingsley, who began farming in the area in 1856. The name has fallen into disuse among people in the area.
