= Edgar Warner Mann =

American politician

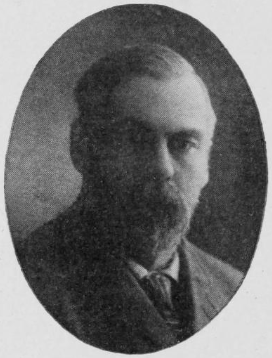
- Born: November 18, 1851; Vienna, Wisconsin
- Died: December 7, 1904 (aged 53); Cheyenne, Wyoming
- Education: Beloit College; University of Wisconsin Law School
- Occupations: Lawyer, politician
- Political party: Republican

Edgar Warner Mann (November 18, 1851 – December 7, 1904) was an American lawyer and territorial legislator.

== Biography ==
Born in the Town of Vienna, Wisconsin, Mann graduated from Beloit College in 1873 and received a law degree from the University of Wisconsin Law School in 1874. Mann then practiced law in Chippewa Falls, Wisconsin. In 1876, he moved to Cheyenne, Wyoming Territory. He served in the Wyoming Territorial Legislature, in the Wyoming Territorial House of Representatives, as a Republican, in 1879. He also served as register of the land office and as city and county attorney in Cheyenne. He died in Cheyenne, Wyoming.
