= Vienna, Wisconsin =

- Town
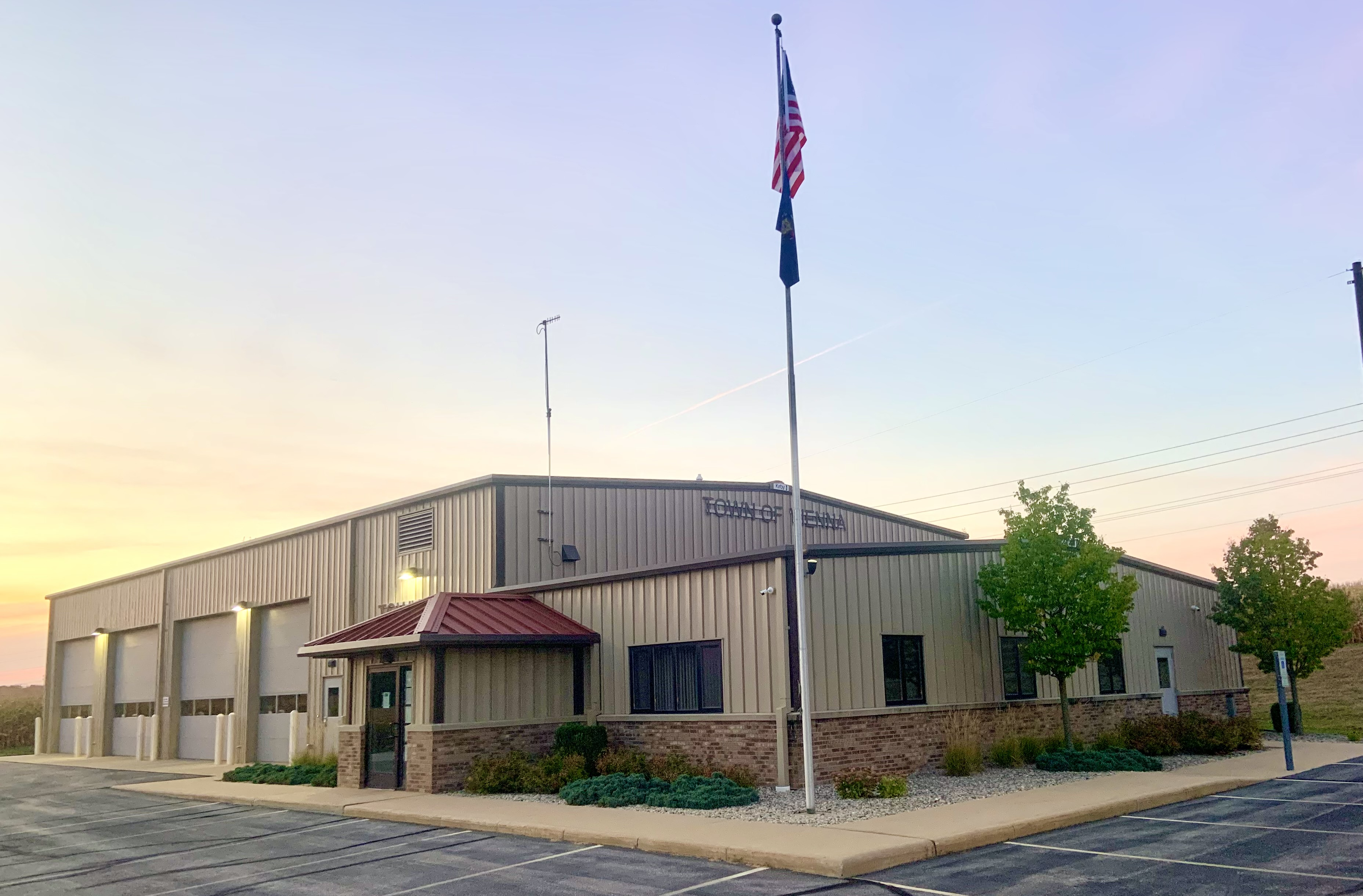
- Town hall

- Location in Dane County and the state of Wisconsin.
- Coordinates: 43°14′48″N 89°24′43″W
- Country: United States
- State: Wisconsin
- County: Dane

Government
  - Town Board Chair: Jerry Marx

Area
  - Total: 35.6 sq mi (92.1 km^{2})
  - Land: 35.6 sq mi (92.1 km^{2})
  - Water: 0.039 sq mi (0.1 km^{2})
- Elevation: 965 ft (294 m)

Population (2020)
  - Total: 1,666
  - Density: 37/sq mi (14.1/km^{2})
- Time zone: UTC-6 (Central (CST))
  - Summer (DST): UTC-5 (CDT)
- Area code: 608
- FIPS code: 55-82750
- GNIS feature ID: 1584331
- Website: https://viennawi.gov/

Vienna is a town in Dane County, Wisconsin, United States. The population was 1,666 at the 2020 census. The unincorporated community of Norway Grove is located in the town.

== Geography ==
According to the United States Census Bureau, the town has a total area of 35.6 square miles (92.2 km^{2}), of which 35.6 square miles (92.1 km^{2}) is land and 0.04 square miles (0.1 km^{2}) (0.06%) is water.

== Demographics ==
At the 2000 census, there were 1,294 people, 461 households and 368 families living in the town. The population density was 36.4 per square mile (14.0/km^{2}). There were 467 housing units at an average density of 13.1 per square mile (5.1/km^{2}). The racial makeup of the town was 98.76% White, 0.39% African American, 0.08% Native American, 0.08% Asian, 0.08% from other races, and 0.62% from two or more races. Hispanic or Latino of any race were 0.31% of the population.

There were 461 households, of which 38.4% had children under the age of 18 living with them, 72.0% were married couples living together, 4.8% had a female householder with no husband present, and 20.0% were non-families. 14.5% of all households were made up of individuals, and 4.8% had someone living alone who was 65 years of age or older. The average household size was 2.81 and the average family size was 3.12.

26.4% of the population under the age of 18, 7.3% from 18 to 24, 30.8% from 25 to 44, 27.4% from 45 to 64, and 8.0% who were 65 years of age or older. The median age was 37 years. For every 100 females, there were 104.1 males. For every 100 females age 18 and over, there were 106.1 males.

The median household income was $60,000 and the median family income was $62,500. Males had a median income of $35,694 versus $27,212 for females. The per capita income for the town was $24,783. About 1.6% of families and 3.3% of the population were below the poverty line, including 3.3% of those under age 18 and 4.2% of those age 65 or over.

== Notable people ==
- Elmore Elver, Wisconsin state legislator and lawyer, was born in the town
- Edgar Warner Mann, Wyoming territorial legislator and lawyer, was born in the town
- John Ollis, Wisconsin state legislator and lawyer, lived in the town
- Hiland J. Spaulding, Wisconsin state legislator and farmer, lived in the town
