= Burke, Wisconsin =

- Town
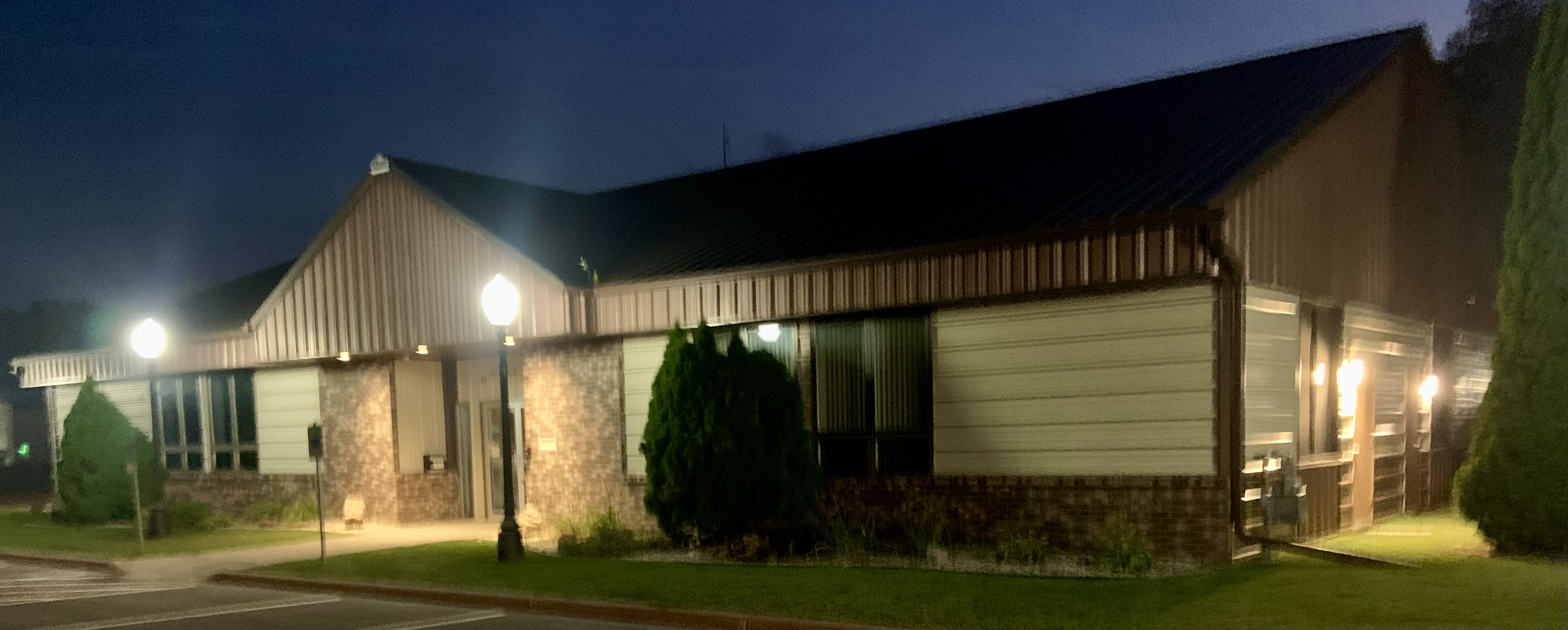
- Town hall

- Location in Dane County and the state of Wisconsin
- Coordinates: 43°9′54″N 89°17′43″W
- Country: United States
- State: Wisconsin
- County: Dane

Area
  - Total: 19.5 sq mi (50.5 km^{2})
  - Land: 19.5 sq mi (50.5 km^{2})
  - Water: 0 sq mi (0.0 km^{2})
- Elevation: 938 ft (286 m)

Population (2020)
  - Total: 3,265
  - Density: 153/sq mi (59.2/km^{2})
- Time zone: UTC-6 (Central (CST))
  - Summer (DST): UTC-5 (CDT)
- Area code: 608
- FIPS code: 55-11150
- GNIS feature ID: 1582887

Burke is a town in Dane County, Wisconsin, United States. The population was 3,265 at the 2020 census. The unincorporated communities of Burke and Seminary Springs are in the town.

== History ==
Burke was named for Irish statesman Edmund Burke, as most of its original residents were Irish. The town is set to be annexed by the City of Madison, the Village of DeForest, and the City of Sun Prairie by 2036.

== Geography ==
According to the United States Census Bureau, the town has a total area of 19.5 square miles (50.5 km^{2}), all land.

== Demographics ==
Historical population
| Census | Pop. | Note | %± |
|---|---|---|---|
| 2000 | 2,990 | | — |
| 2010 | 3,284 | | 9.8% |
| 2020 | 3,265 | | −0.6% |
U.S. Decennial Census

At the 2000 census there were 2,990 people, 1,148 households, and 862 families living in the town. The population density was 153.4 people per square mile (59.2/km^{2}). There were 1,208 housing units at an average density of 62.0 per square mile (23.9/km^{2}). The racial makeup of the town was 96.15% White, 0.90% African American, 0.27% Native American, 1.04% Asian, 0.43% from other races, and 1.20% from two or more races. Hispanic or Latino of any race were 1.57%.

Of the 1,148 households 33.4% had children under the age of 18 living with them, 65.9% were married couples living together, 5.8% had a female householder with no husband present, and 24.9% were non-families. 17.5% of households were one person and 4.3% were one person aged 65 or older. The average household size was 2.60 and the average family size was 2.95.

The age distribution was 24.0% under the age of 18, 6.8% from 18 to 24, 32.4% from 25 to 44, 29.6% from 45 to 64, and 7.1% 65 or older. The median age was 38 years. For every 100 females, there were 103.3 males. For every 100 females age 18 and over, there were 102.2 males.

The median household income was $67,273 and the median family income was $72,065. Males had a median income of $43,125 versus $29,469 for females. The per capita income for the town was $28,458. About 1.3% of families and 2.9% of the population were below the poverty line, including none of those under age 18 and 8.0% of those age 65 or over.

== Notable people ==
- Hiram N. Moulton, Mayor of Madison, Wisconsin
- John M. Nelson, U.S. Representative
- Herman W. Sachtjen, Wisconsin State Representative and jurist
- William Robert Taylor, Governor of Wisconsin
