= Springfield Corners, Wisconsin =

- Unincorporated community
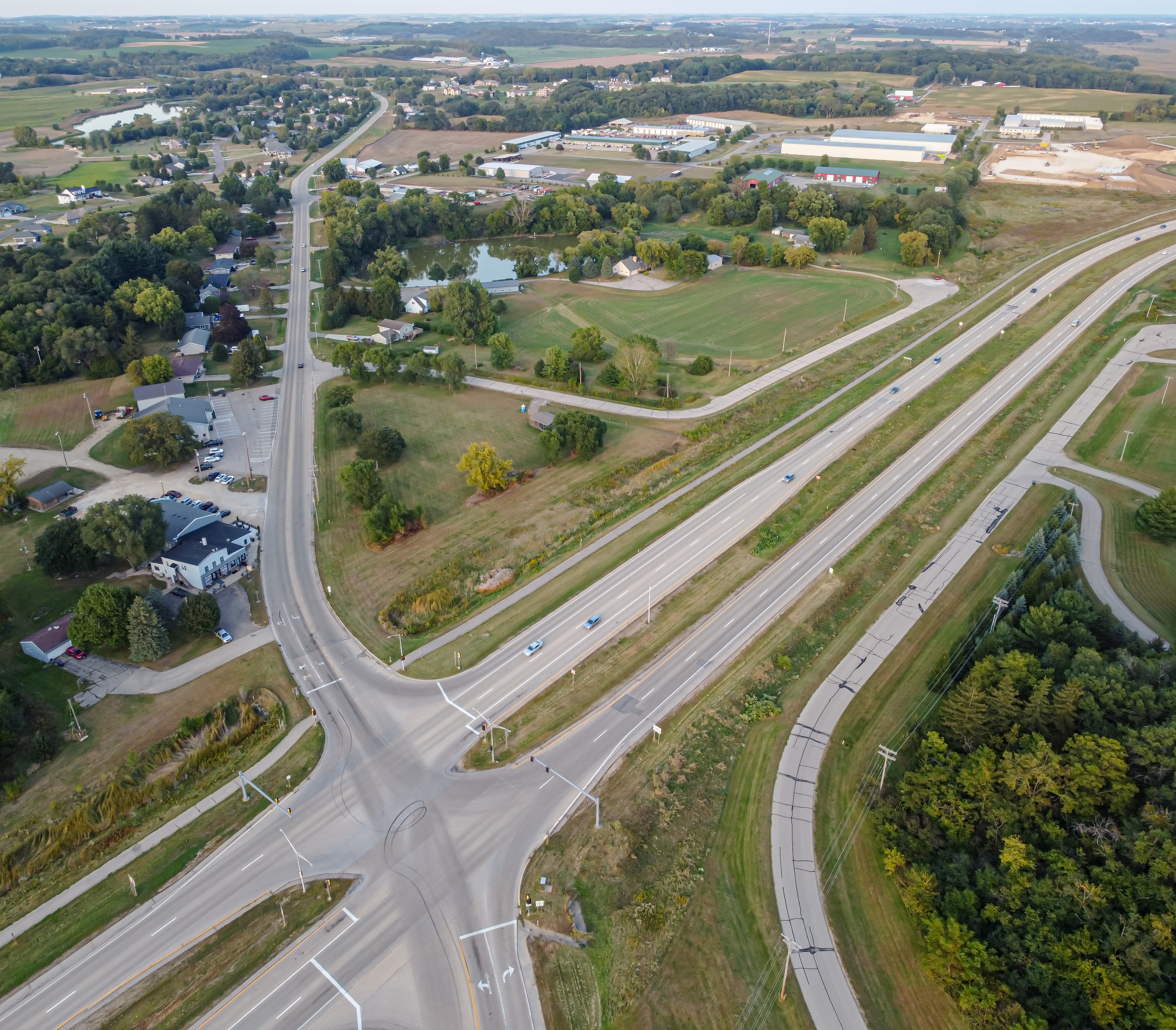

- Location within Wisconsin Location within the United States
- Coordinates: 43°11′31″N 89°33′59″W
- Country: United States
- State: Wisconsin
- County: Dane County
- Town: Springfield
- Elevation: 968 ft (295 m)
- Time zone: UTC-6 (Central (CST))
  - Summer (DST): UTC-5 (CDT)
- Area code: 608
- GNIS feature ID: 1574723

Springfield Corners is an unincorporated community located in the town of Springfield, Dane County, Wisconsin, United States, at the intersection of County Highway P and US Highway 12. The town hall for the Town of Springfield is located in the community, along with a park, several businesses, several neighborhoods, and a small business park.
