= Door Creek, Wisconsin =

- Unincorporated community
- Location within Wisconsin Location within the United States
- Coordinates: 43°01′51″N 89°11′59″W
- Country: United States
- State: Wisconsin
- County: Dane County
- Town: Cottage Grove
- Elevation: 948 ft (289 m)
- Time zone: UTC-6 (Central (CST))
  - Summer (DST): UTC-5 (CDT)
- Area code: 608
- GNIS feature ID: 1577576

Door Creek (also Buckeye, Deer Creek) is an unincorporated community located in the town of Cottage Grove, Dane County, Wisconsin, United States.

== Notable people ==
- Isaac Adams lived in Door Creek. He was a farmer and a member of the Wisconsin State Assembly.
