= Henry Powell (Wisconsin politician) =

American politician

Henry Powell (December 7, 1838 – April 9, 1902) was an American politician.

Born in Worcester, England, he moved to Newport, Wisconsin Territory in 1845 and then Mazomanie, Wisconsin in 1865. He served in the 1st Wisconsin Heavy Artillery Regiment during the American Civil War. He served as justice of the peace, in town government, and on the Dane County, Wisconsin Board of Supervisors and the chairman of the board. He served in Wisconsin State Assembly in 1887 as a Republican. He died in Mazomanie, Wisconsin.
