= Seminary Springs, Wisconsin =

- Unincorporated community
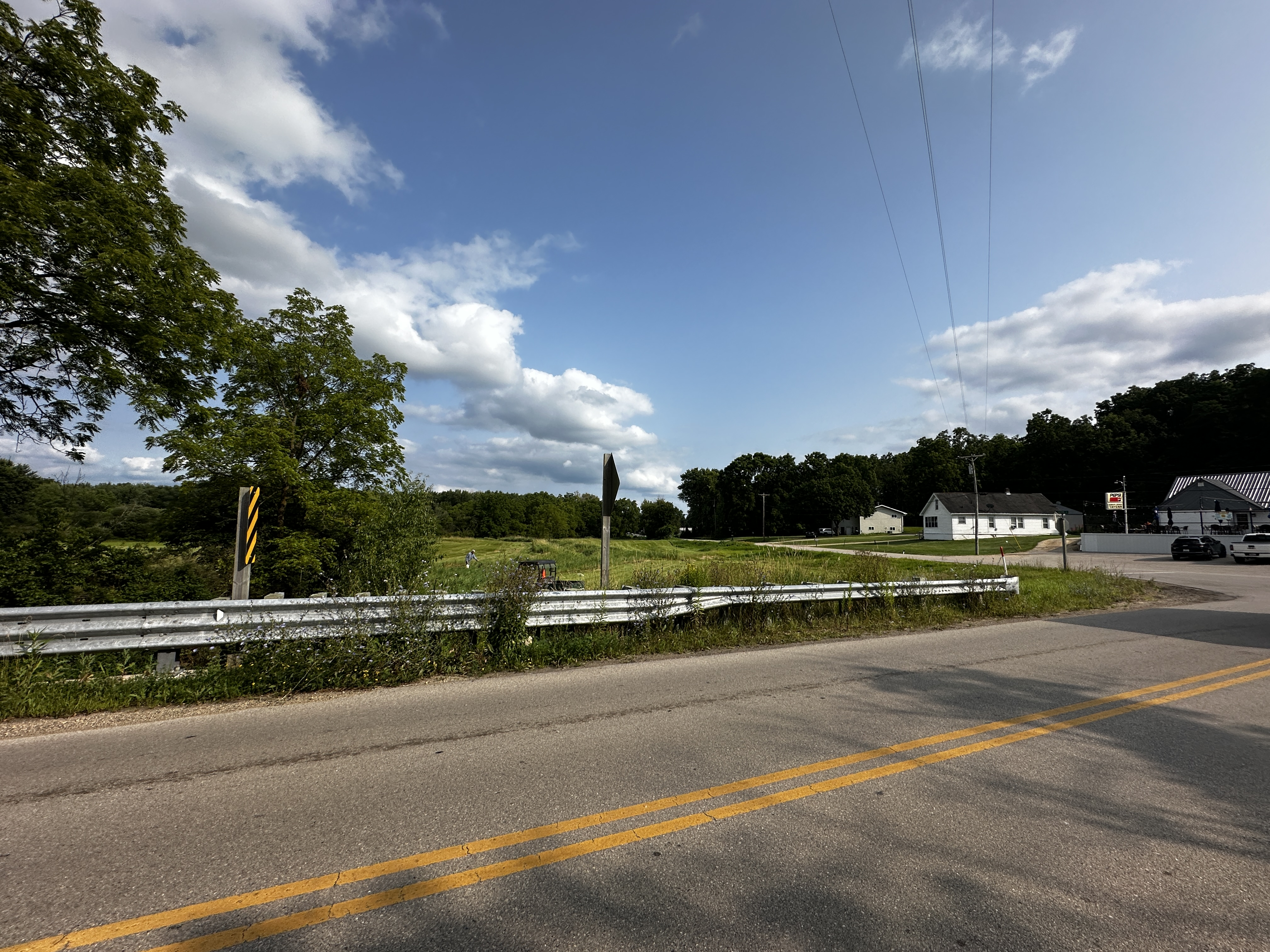
- Seminary Springs pictured in July 2024

- Location within Wisconsin Location within the United States
- Coordinates: 43°06′31″N 89°14′55″W
- Country: United States
- State: Wisconsin
- County: Dane County
- Town: Burke
- Elevation: 906 ft (276 m)
- Time zone: UTC-6 (Central (CST))
  - Summer (DST): UTC-5 (CDT)
- Area code: 608
- GNIS feature ID: 1573898

Seminary Springs is an unincorporated community located in the town of Burke, Dane County, Wisconsin, United States.
