= George Reinke =

American politician (1914–2009)

County Executive of Dane County, Wisconsin
- In office 1973–1981

Personal details
- Born: December 27, 1914 Middleton, Wisconsin, U.S.
- Died: September 22, 2009 (aged 94) Madison, Wisconsin, U.S.
- Occupation: Politician

George Reinke (December 27, 1914 – September 22, 2009) was the first elected County Executive of Dane County, Wisconsin, United States.

Born in the town of Middleton, Wisconsin, Reinke served in the Dane County government as an accountant, county clerk, and county administrator. He served as County Executive of Dane County from 1973 to 1981. He died in Madison, Wisconsin.
