= Vermont, Wisconsin =

Vermont
- Town
- Town of Vermont
- Location in Dane County and the state of Wisconsin.
- Coordinates: 43°04′32″N 89°46′24″W
- Country: United States
- State: Wisconsin
- County: Dane

Area
  - Total: 35.8 sq mi (92.6 km^{2})
  - Land: 35.8 sq mi (92.6 km^{2})
  - Water: 0 sq mi (0.0 km^{2})
- Elevation: 945 ft (288 m)

Population (2020)
  - Total: 871
  - Density: 24/sq mi (9.1/km^{2})
- Time zone: UTC-6 (Central (CST))
  - Summer (DST): UTC-5 (CDT)
- Area code: 608
- FIPS code: 55-82525
- GNIS feature ID: 1729677
- Website: https://townofvermontwi.gov/

Vermont is a town located in Dane County, Wisconsin, United States. The population was 871 at the 2020 Census. The unincorporated communities of Elvers and Vermont are located in the town.

== Geography ==
According to the United States Census Bureau, the town has a total area of 35.8 square miles (92.6 km^{2}), all land.

== Demographics ==
At the 2000 census there were 839 people, 298 households, and 241 families living in the town. The population density was 23.5 people per square mile (9.1/km^{2}). There were 312 housing units at an average density of 8.7 per square mile (3.4/km^{2}). The racial makeup of the town was 97.85% White, 0.48% Native American, 0.60% Asian, 0.72% from other races, and 0.36% from two or more races. Hispanic or Latino of any race were 0.48%.

Of the 298 households 39.3% had children under the age of 18 living with them, 72.8% were married couples living together, 4.4% had a female householder with no husband present, and 18.8% were non-families. 12.8% of households were one person and 5.0% were one person aged 65 or older. The average household size was 2.82 and the average family size was 3.05.

The age distribution was 26.9% under the age of 18, 5.0% from 18 to 24, 29.2% from 25 to 44, 28.7% from 45 to 64, and 10.1% 65 or older. The median age was 40 years. For every 100 females, there were 107 males. For every 100 females age 18 and over, there were 101 males.

The median household income was $65,208 and the median family income was $70,750. Males had a median income of $42,132 versus $37,361 for females. The per capita income for the town was $26,549. About 0.8% of families and 2.8% of the population were below the poverty line, including none of those under age 18 and 8.3% of those age 65 or over.

== Notable person ==
- Mark Pocan – U.S. representative, former Wisconsin state assemblyman
