= Picher, Germany =

Picher
- Municipality
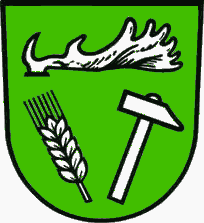
- Coat of arms

- Location of Picher within Ludwigslust-Parchim district
- Interactive map of Picher
- Location within Germany Location within Mecklenburg-Vorpommern
- Coordinates: 53°20′N 11°21′E
- Country: Germany
- State: Mecklenburg-Vorpommern
- District: Ludwigslust-Parchim
- Municipal assoc.: Hagenow-Land

Government
  - Mayor: Holger Hille

Area
  - Total: 39.09 km^{2} (15.09 sq mi)
- Elevation: 55 m (180 ft)

Population (2025-12-31)
  - Total: 634
  - Density: 16.2/km^{2} (42.0/sq mi)
- Time zone: UTC+01:00 (CET)
  - Summer (DST): UTC+02:00 (CEST)
- Postal codes: 19230
- Dialling codes: 038751
- Vehicle registration: LUP, LWL
- Website: www.amt-hagenow-land.de

Picher is a municipality in the district of Ludwigslust-Parchim in the state of Mecklenburg-Western Pomerania, Germany. As of December 2020, Picher's population is 642.

== Geography ==
Picher is located in northern end of the Griesen area, a forested zone that is in between the rivers Sude, Elde and Elbe. The closest full size city is Ludwiglust, about 12 km away. Picher is close to the A 24 freeway connecting Berlin and Hamburg. A smaller nearby town called Bresegard has part of its full name (Bresegard bei Picher) from Picher. This town has traditionally been associated with Picher, first being part of Picher's ecclesiastical territory, and also as a way of differentiating itself from the other Bresegard (Bresegard bei Eldena).

== History ==
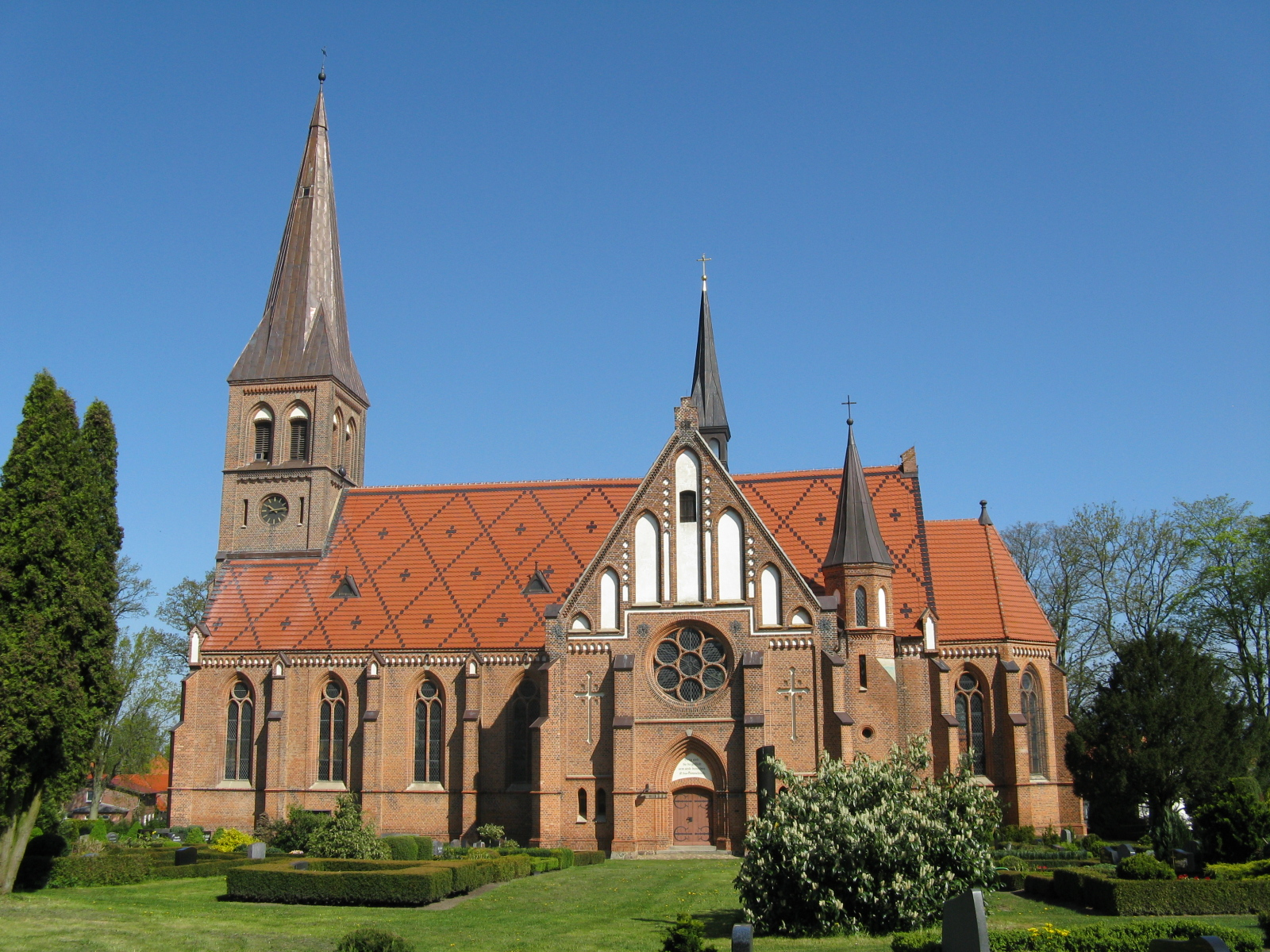
Picher's neogothic church from the 19th century

This area of Germany (Mecklenburg) was once occupied by Slavic peoples. Starting in the 11th century the local western Slavic populace began intermixing with incoming German settlers. Several centuries later the area was considered completely "Germanized".

Picher was mentioned in 1291 for the first time as "Pychere" and initially belonged to the County of Dannenberg, but by the 14th century it had become part of the County of Schwerin. A church in 13th century Picher is mentioned 1319 for the first time. This church was destroyed, replaced and expanded repeatedly. By 1875 the church in Picher was considered quite old; it was decided to replace the structure with a brand new edifice in the neogothic style.

Picher was part of the area initially captured or occupied by American troops at the end of World War Two. In other words, Picher was on the American side of the line of contact between American Soviet forces. Due to previous agreements by the Allied powers, this part of Germany was transferred to Soviet control some several weeks after the American occupation. As a remote village Picher did not suffer war time destruction.

Since Medieval times Picher had a rural church center, first Catholic and later Lutheran. Still standing and operating in Picher is a large Brick Gothic revival Lutheran church, which was built in the 1870s. During Picher's time as a town in East Germany the cemetery surrounding the Picher church had most of its headstones removed and/or destroyed under authority from local government officials. Since German Reunification some families have restored markers, some using a single family name headstone as a catch-all replacement.
