= Martinsville, Wisconsin =

- Unincorporated community
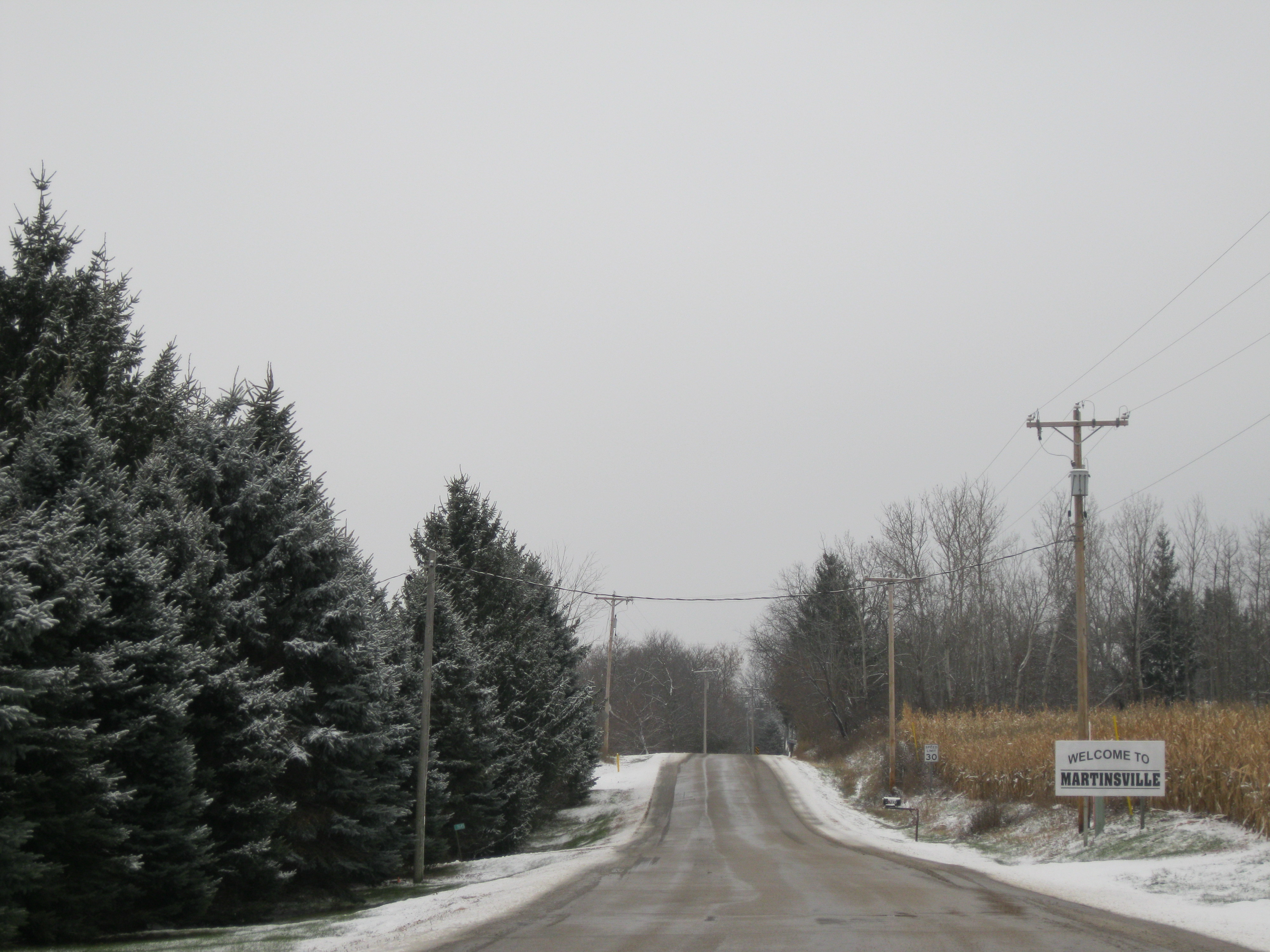
- Entering Martinsville

- Location within Wisconsin Location within the United States
- Coordinates: 43°10′49″N 89°35′24″W
- Country: United States
- State: Wisconsin
- County: Dane County
- Town: Springfield
- Elevation: 1,155 ft (352 m)
- Time zone: UTC-6 (Central (CST))
  - Summer (DST): UTC-5 (CDT)
- Area code: 608
- GNIS feature ID: 1569097

Martinsville is an unincorporated community located in the town of Springfield, Dane County, Wisconsin, United States.

== Gallery ==
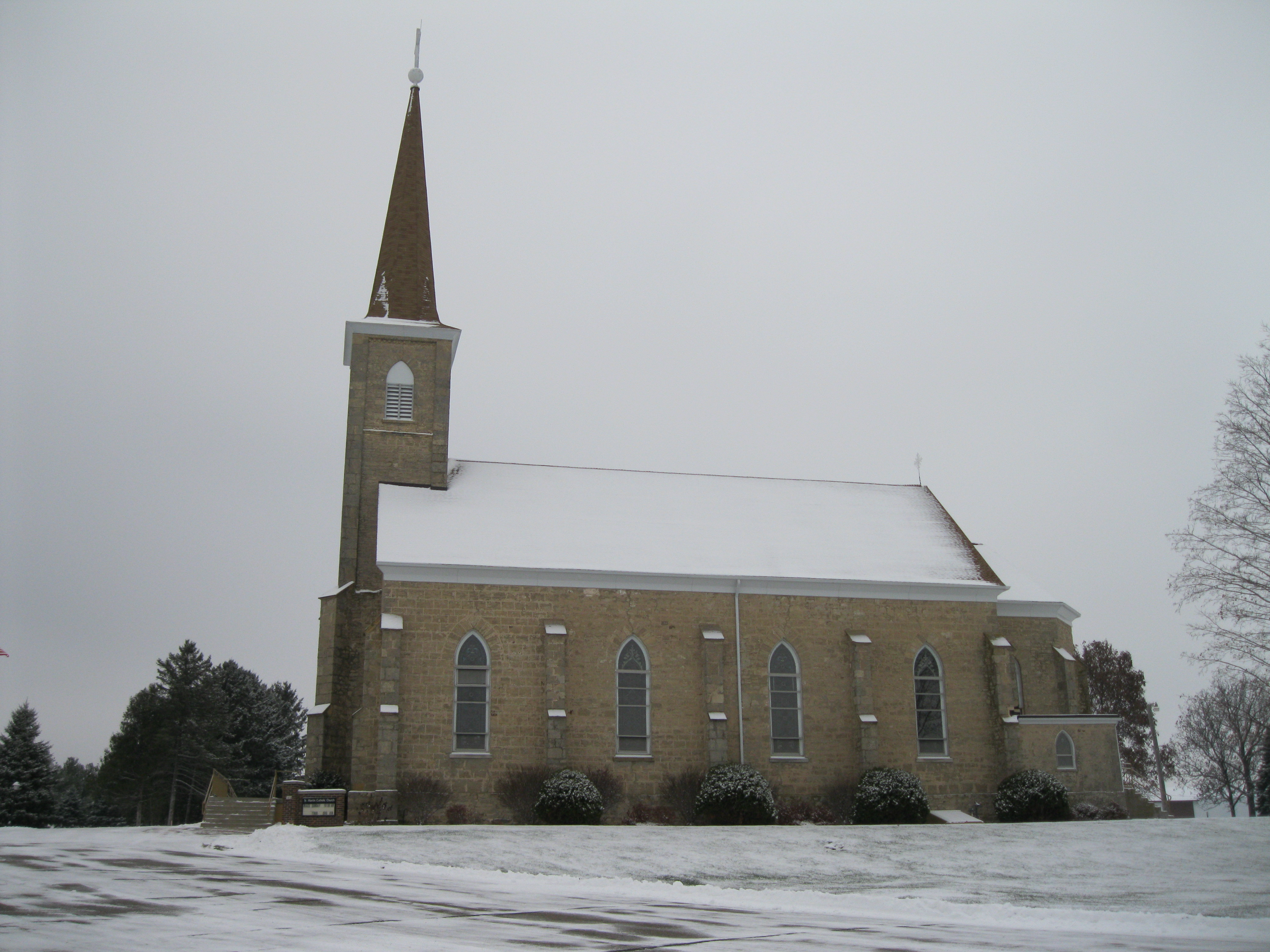
St. Martin Catholic Church

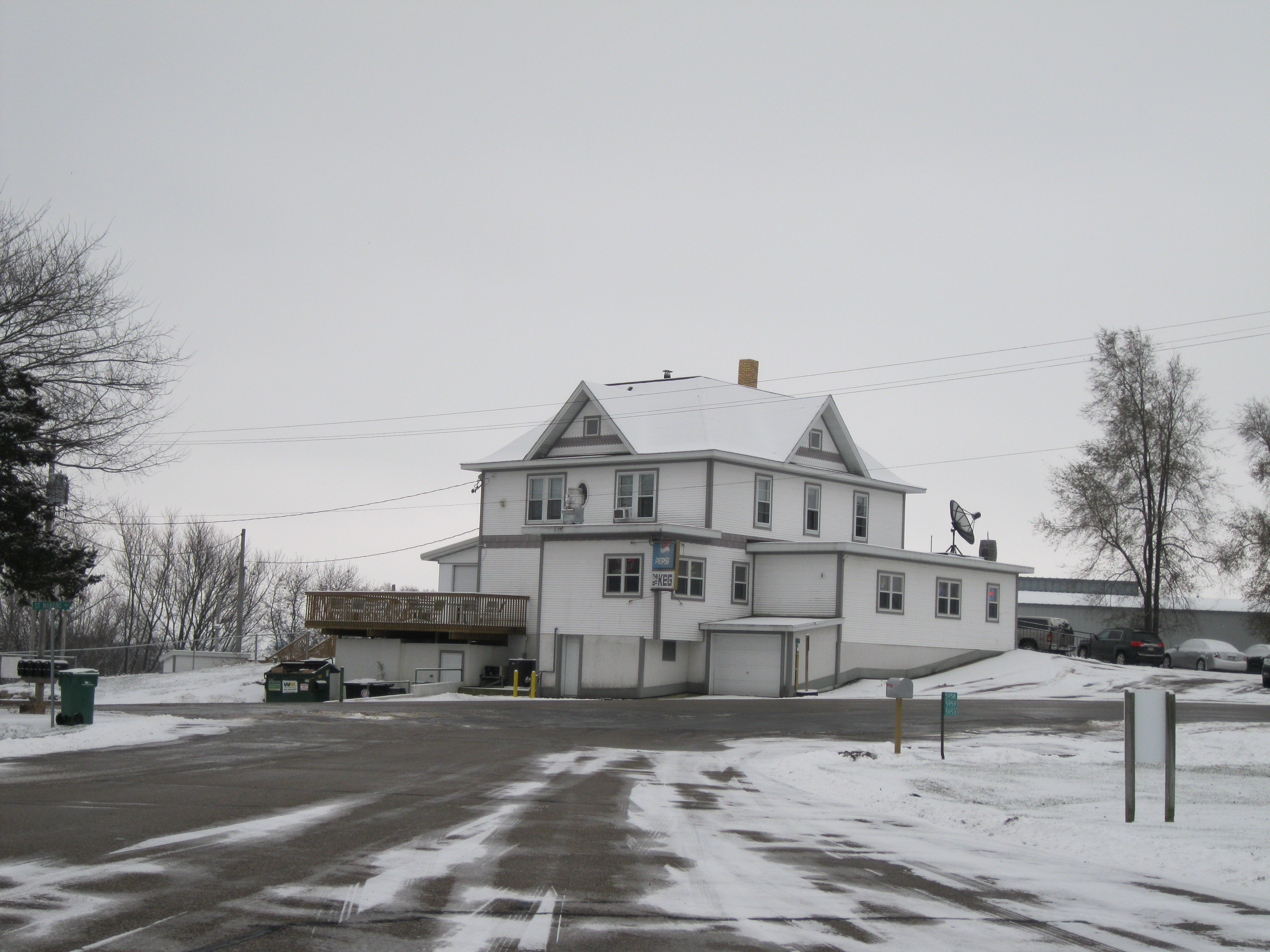
The Keg, a local bar
