= Cottage Grove (town), Wisconsin =

Town of Cottage Grove
- Town
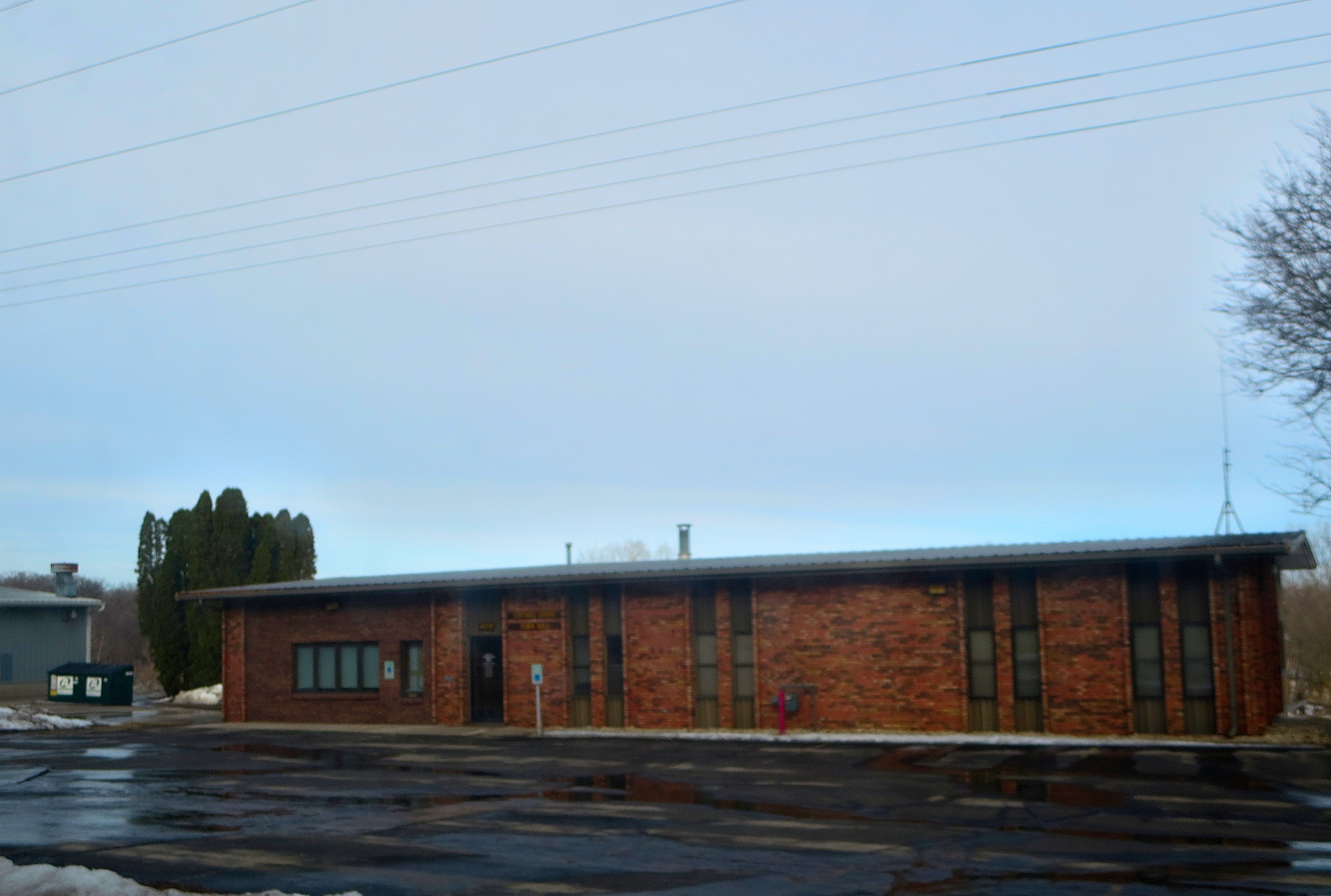
- Cottage Grove Town Hall
- Motto: "Where Everyone Is Your Neighbor"
- Location in Dane County and the state of Wisconsin

- Location within Wisconsin Location within the United States
- Coordinates: 43°03′44″N 89°11′43″W
- Country: United States
- State: Wisconsin
- Counties: Dane County

Area
  - Total: 30.94 sq mi (80.1 km^{2})
  - Land: 30.90 sq mi (80.0 km^{2})
  - Water: 0.05 sq mi (0.13 km^{2})

Population (2020)
  - Total: 3,791
  - Density: 122.7/sq mi (47.37/km^{2})
- Time zone: UTC-6 (Central (CST))
  - Summer (DST): UTC-5 (CDT)
- Zip code: 53527
- Area code: 608
- Website: Town of Cottage Grove, Wisconsin

The Town of Cottage Grove is located in Dane County, Wisconsin, United States. As of the 2020 census, the town had a population of 3,791. The Village of Cottage Grove is located partially in the town, but is governed independently. The unincorporated communities of Door Creek, Nora, and Vilas also are located in the town. The unincorporated communities of Hoffman Corners and Hope also are located partially in the town.

== Geography ==
The town is located at 43°03′44″N 89°11′43″W. According to the United States Census Bureau, the town has a total area of 33.4 square miles (87 km^{2}), all land.

== Demographics ==
As of the census of 2020, there were 3,791 people, 1,477 households, and 1,468 families residing in the town. The population density was 115.0 people per square mile (44.4 people/km^{2}). There were 1,356 housing units at an average density of 40.6 units per square mile (15.7 units/km^{2}). The racial makeup of the town was 97.89% White, 0.39% Black or African American, 0.10% Native American, 0.78% Asian, 0.16% from other races, and 0.68% from two or more races. 1.04% of the population were Hispanic or Latino of any race.

There were 1,338 households, out of which 40.7% had children under the age of 18 living with them, 75.3% were married couples living together, 5.2% had a female householder with no husband present, and 16.4% were non-families. 11.4% of all households were made up of individuals, and 2.7% had someone living alone who was 65 years of age or older. The average household size was 2.87 and the average family size was 3.13.

The population was 28.8% under the age of 18, 5.3% from 18 to 24, 30.7% from 25 to 44, 28.8% from 45 to 64, and 6.3% who were 65 years of age or older. The median age was 38 years. For every 100 females, there were 104 males. For every 100 females age 18 and over, there were 104 males.

The median income for a household in the town was $71,007, and the median income for a family was $72,246. Males had a median income of $45,379 versus $30,509 for females. The per capita income for the town was $26,602. About 1.3% of families and 2.4% of the population were below the poverty line, including none of those under age 18 and 9.7% of those age 65 or over.

== Notable people ==
- Henry G. Klinefelter, Wisconsin State Representative and farmer, lived in the town
- Albert M. Stondall, Wisconsin State Senator and businessman, was born in the town
