= West Middleton, Wisconsin =

- Unincorporated community
- Location within Wisconsin Location within the United States
- Coordinates: 43°03′37″N 89°34′18″W
- Country: United States
- State: Wisconsin
- County: Dane County
- Town: Middleton
- Elevation: 1,079 ft (329 m)
- Time zone: UTC-6 (Central (CST))
  - Summer (DST): UTC-5 (CDT)
- Area code: 608
- GNIS feature ID: 1842754

West Middleton is an unincorporated community in Dane County, Wisconsin, United States, located just west of the city of Madison in the town of Middleton. It is home to West Middleton Elementary School, West Middleton Lutheran Church, West Middleton Laurel Baseball Team, and several large residential sub-divisions.
