= Cottage Grove, Wisconsin =

- Village
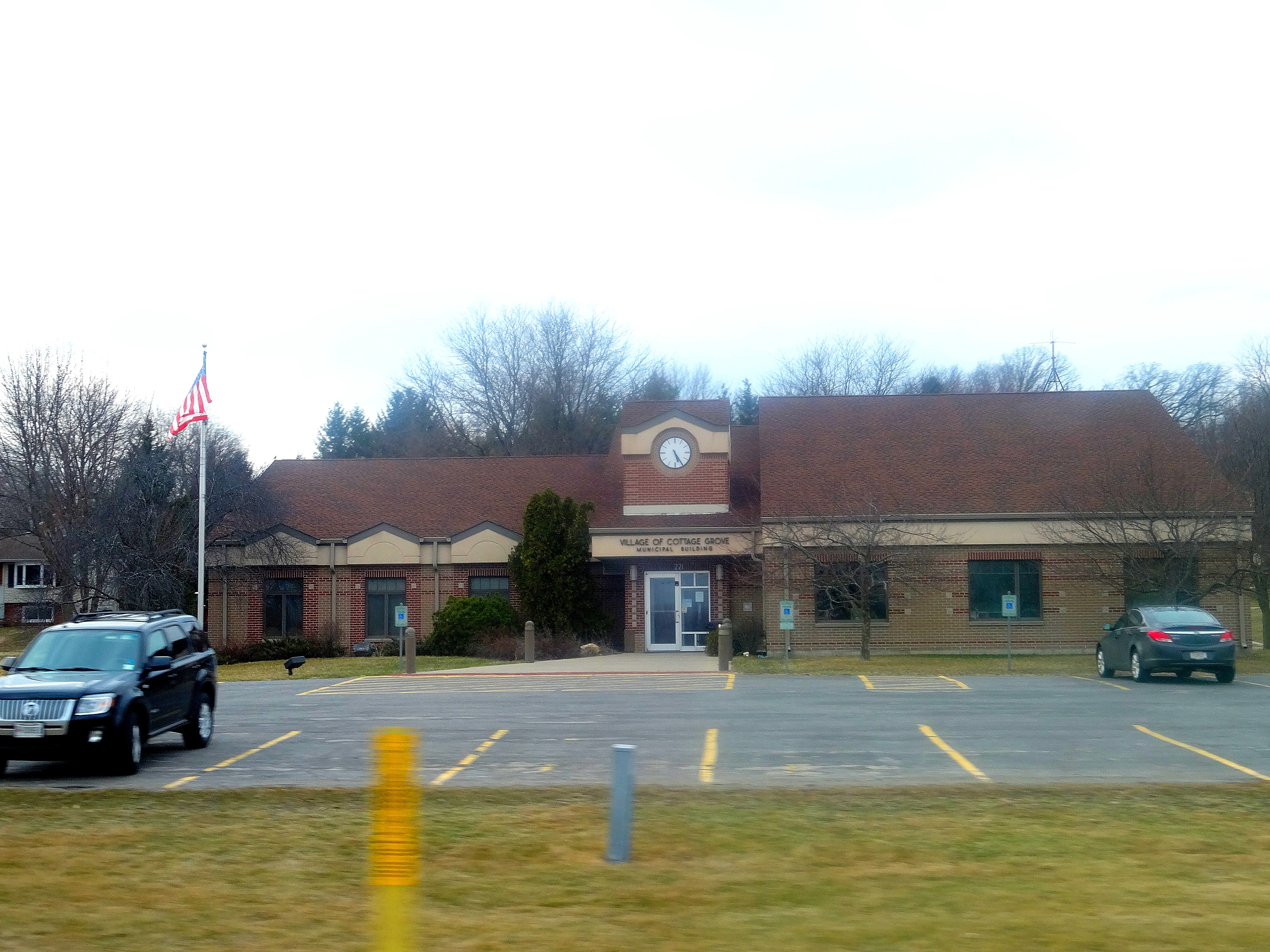
- Cottage Grove municipal building
- Interactive map of Cottage Grove, Wisconsin
- Location within Wisconsin Location within the United States
- Coordinates: 43°5′16″N 89°12′00″W
- Country: United States
- State: Wisconsin
- County: Dane

Area
  - Total: 4.69 sq mi (12.15 km^{2})
  - Land: 4.69 sq mi (12.15 km^{2})
  - Water: 0 sq mi (0.00 km^{2})
- Elevation: 892 ft (272 m)

Population (2020)
  - Total: 7,303
  - Estimate (2025): 8,930
  - Density: 1,522.9/sq mi (587.99/km^{2})
- Time zone: UTC-6 (Central (CST))
  - Summer (DST): UTC-5 (CDT)
- Postal code: 53527
- Area code: 608
- FIPS code: 55-17200
- GNIS feature ID: 1583018
- Website: www.vi.cottagegrove.wi.gov

Cottage Grove is a village in Dane County, Wisconsin, United States. Its population was 7,303 at the 2020 census. A suburb of Madison, it shares a school district with Monona. The village is located partially within the survey township of Cottage Grove.

The village was named from a settler's cottage in a grove near the village site.

== Geography ==
Cottage Grove is located at 43°5′16″N 89°12′0″W (43.088017, -89.200143).

According to the United States Census Bureau, the village has a total area of 3.48 square miles (9.01 km^{2}), all land.

== Demographics ==
Historical population
Census	Pop.	Note	%±
1930	261		—
1940	310		18.8%
1950	372		20.0%
1960	413		11.0%
1970	478		15.7%
1980	888		85.8%
1990	1,131		27.4%
2000	4,059		258.9%
2010	6,192		52.5%
2020	7,303		17.9%
2025 (est.)	8,930		22.3%
U.S. Decennial Census

=== 2010 census ===
As of the census of 2010, 6,192 people, 2,210 households, and 1,628 families were living in the village. The population density was 1,779.3 inhabitants per square mile (687.0/km^{2}). There were 2,289 housing units at an average density of 657.8 per square mile (254.0/km^{2}). The racial makeup of the village was 92.1% White, 2.5% African American, 0.2% Native American, 2.2% Asian, 1.1% from other races, and 2.0% from two or more races. Hispanics or Latinos of any race were 3.0% of the population.

Of the 2,210 households, 47.1% had children under 18 living with them, 59.4% were married couples living together, 9.3% had a female householder with no husband present, 4.9% had a male householder with no wife present, and 26.3% were not families. About 20.2% of all households were made up of individuals, and 9.0% had someone living alone who was 65 or older. The average household size was 2.80. and the average family size was 3.26.

The median age in the village was 33.8 years. About 32.5% of residents were under 18; 5.7% were between 18 and 24; 32.4% were from 25 to 44; 21.7% were from 45 to 64; and 7.7% were 65 or older. The gender makeup of the village was 49.0% male and 51.0% female.

=== 2000 census ===
As of the census of 2000, 4,059 people, 1,427 households, and 1,084 families were living in the village. The population density was 1,775.3 people per square mile (684.4/km^{2}). The 1,453 housing units had an average density of 635.5 per square mile (245.0/km^{2}). The racial makeup of the village was 95.71% White, 1.82% African American, 0.25% Native American, 0.49% Asian, 0.54% from other races, and 1.18% from two or more races. Around 1.80% of the population were Hispanics or Latinos of any race.

Of the 1,427 households, 47.3% had children under 18 living with them, 65.0% were married couples living together, 7.5% had a female householder with no husband present, and 24.0% were not families. About 16.1% of all households were made up of individuals, and 6.0% had someone living alone who was 65 or older. The average household size was 2.83, and the average family size was 3.20.

In the village, the age distribution was 32.1% under 18, 5.6% from 18 to 24, 42.1% from 25 to 44, 14.3% from 45 to 64, and 6.0% who were 65 or older. The median age was 31 years. For every 100 females, there were 102.5 males. For every 100 females 18 and over, there were 97.3 males.

The median income for a household in the village was $66,628, and for a family was $68,667. Males had a median income of $46,190 versus $30,391 for females. The per capita income for the village was $25,777. About 2.7% of families and 3.8% of the population were below the poverty line, including 4.6% of those under 18 and 12.6% of those 65 or over.

== Notable people ==
- Isaac Adams, member of the Wisconsin State Assembly
- Gabe Carimi, former professional football player in the National Football League
- Henry G. Klinefelter, member of the Wisconsin State Assembly
- John Leiber, 37th state treasurer of Wisconsin
- John E. Mellish, amateur astronomer and telescope builder
- Melissa Ratcliff, member of the Wisconsin Senate
- Albert M. Stondall, businessman and member of the Wisconsin Senate
- William Robert Taylor, 12th governor of Wisconsin
- Jessie Vetter, member of the United States women's national ice hockey team
- Henry M. Warner, member of the Wisconsin State Assembly
