= Springfield, Dane County, Wisconsin =

Springfield, Wisconsin
- Town
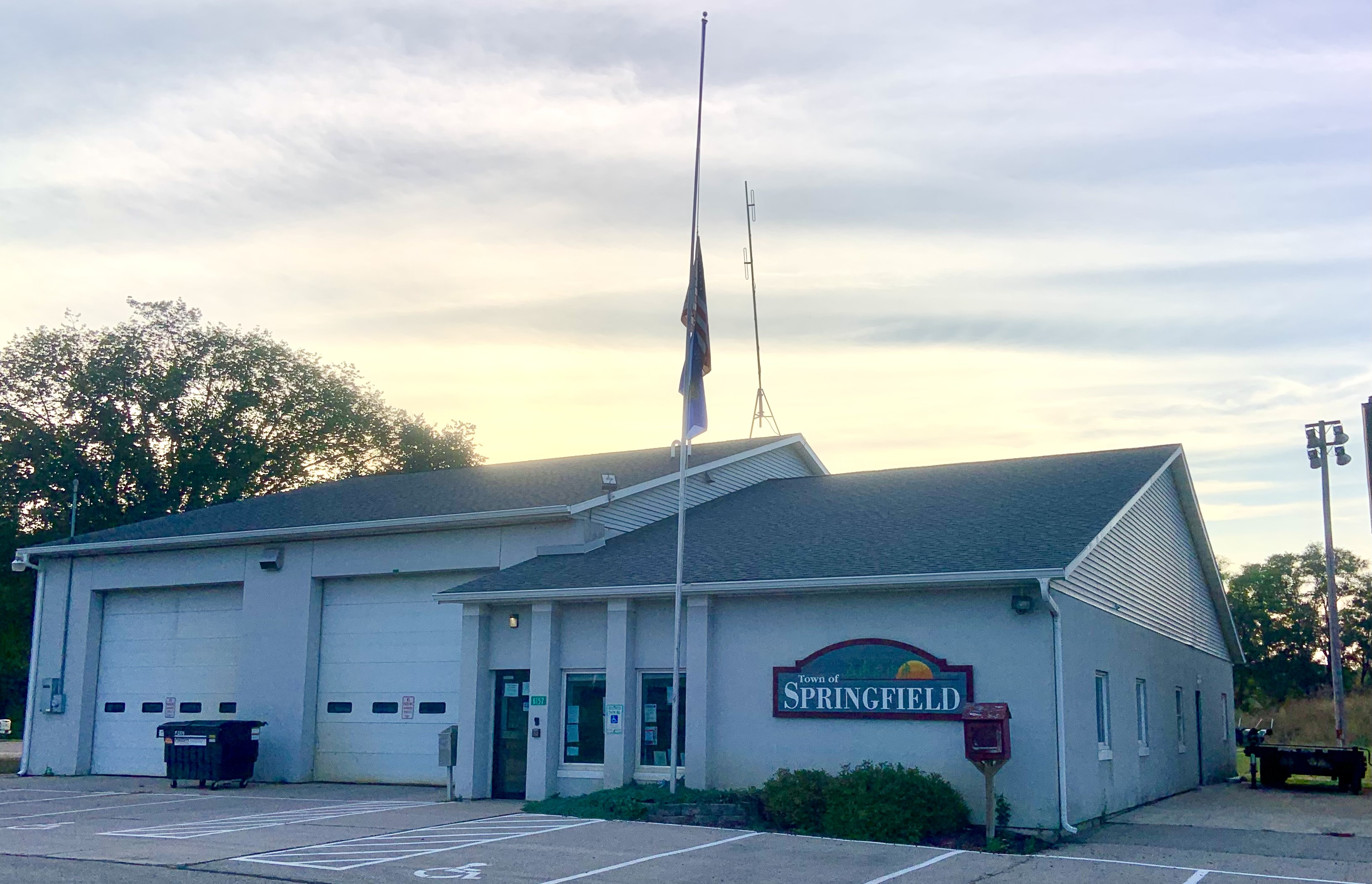
- Town hall in Springfield Corners

- Location in Dane County and the state of Wisconsin.
- Coordinates: 43°9′57″N 89°32′44″W
- Country: United States
- State: Wisconsin
- County: Dane

Area
  - Total: 36.4 sq mi (94.2 km^{2})
  - Land: 36.2 sq mi (93.8 km^{2})
  - Water: 0.19 sq mi (0.5 km^{2})
- Elevation: 1,056 ft (322 m)

Population (2020)
  - Total: 2,929
  - Density: 76/sq mi (29.5/km^{2})
- Time zone: UTC-6 (Central (CST))
  - Summer (DST): UTC-5 (CDT)
- Area code: 608
- FIPS code: 55-75875
- GNIS feature ID: 1584192
- Website: www.town.springfield.wi.us

Springfield is a town in Dane County, Wisconsin, United States. The population was 2,929 at the time of the 2020 census. The unincorporated communities of Ashton, Ashton Corners, Kingsley Corners, Martinsville, and Springfield Corners are located in Springfield.

== History ==
Springfield was established as a small colony by settlers from the United Kingdom. Springfield served as the location of Black Hawk War battles. The town was officially organized in 1848, after which various officers were elected to manage the community.

== Geography ==
According to the United States Census Bureau, the town has a total area of 36.4 square miles (94.2 km^{2}), of which 36.2 square miles (93.8 km^{2}) is land and 0.2 square mile (0.5 km^{2}) (0.49%) is water.

== Demographics ==
At the 2000 census there were 2,762 people, 967 households, and 770 families living in the town. The population density was 76.3 people per square mile (29.5/km^{2}). There were 993 housing units at an average density of 27.4 per square mile (10.6/km^{2}). The racial makeup of the town was 97.68% White, 0.54% African American, 0.07% Native American, 0.54% Asian, 0.36% from other races, and 0.80% from two or more races. Hispanic or Latino of any race were 0.72%.

Of the 967 households 41.2% had children under the age of 18 living with them, 72.7% were married couples living together, 3.8% had a female householder with no husband present, and 20.3% were non-families. 14.4% of households were one person and 4.3% were one person aged 65 or older. The average household size was 2.86 and the average family size was 3.20.

The age distribution was 30.1% under the age of 18, 5.5% from 18 to 24, 28.3% from 25 to 44, 28.6% from 45 to 64, and 7.5% 65 or older. The median age was 38 years. For every 100 females, there were 105.4 males. For every 100 females age 18 and over, there were 109.1 males.

The median household income was $68,663 and the median family income was $76,295. Males had a median income of $49,792 versus $31,674 for females. The per capita income for the town was $26,946. About 3.4% of families and 3.8% of the population were below the poverty line, including 3.0% of those under age 18 and 6.3% of those age 65 or over.

== Notable people ==
- Bernard Esser, farmer, businessman, and politician.
