= Dane County, Wisconsin =

County in Wisconsin, United States

- County
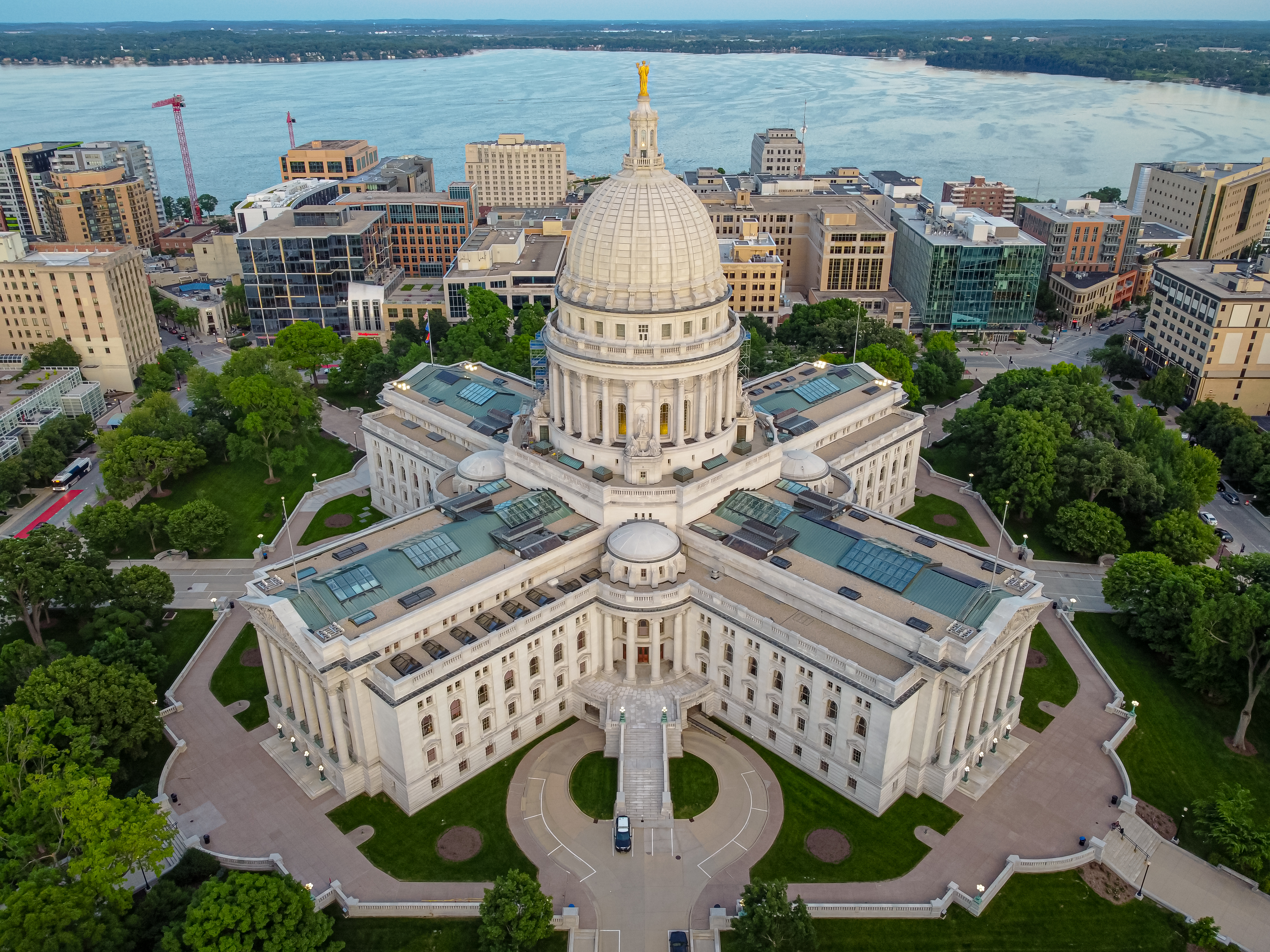
- Wisconsin State Capitol building

- Seal

- Location within the U.S. state of Wisconsin
- Coordinates: 43°04′N 89°25′W
- Country: United States
- State: Wisconsin
- Founded: 1836
- Named for: Nathan Dane
- Seat: Madison
- Largest city: Madison

Government
  - Executive: Melissa Agard

Area
  - Total: 1,238 sq mi (3,210 km^{2})
  - Land: 1,197 sq mi (3,100 km^{2})
  - Water: 41 sq mi (110 km^{2}) 3.3%

Population (2020)
  - Total: 561,504
  - Estimate (2026): 621,365 ▲
  - Density: 469.1/sq mi (181.1/km^{2})
- Time zone: UTC−6 (Central)
  - Summer (DST): UTC−5 (CDT)
- Congressional district: 2nd
- Website: danecounty.gov

Dane County is a county in the U.S. state of Wisconsin. The population was 561,504 at the 2020 census, making it the second-most populous county in Wisconsin, after Milwaukee County. The county seat is Madison, which is also the state capital.

Dane County is the fastest growing county in Wisconsin and contains nearly 10% of the state's population, up from about 5% in 1950. It forms the core of the Madison metropolitan area and is part of the broader Madison–Janesville–Beloit combined statistical area.

== History ==
Dane County was formed in 1836 as a territorial county and organized in 1839. It was named after Nathan Dane, a Massachusetts delegate to the Congress of the Confederation who helped carve Wisconsin out of the Northwest Territory. Dane County was settled in the 1840s by settlers from New England.

== Geography ==
According to the U.S. Census Bureau, the county has an area of 1,238 square miles (3,210 km^{2}), of which 1,197 square miles (3,100 km^{2}) is land and 41 square miles (110 km^{2}) (3.3%) is water.

Soils of Dane County

=== Major highways ===
- Interstate 39
- Interstate 90
- Interstate 94
- U.S. Route 12
- U.S. Route 14
- U.S. Route 18
- U.S. Route 51
- U.S. Route 151
- Highway 19 (Wisconsin)
- Highway 30 (Wisconsin)
- Highway 69 (Wisconsin)
- Highway 73 (Wisconsin)
- Highway 78 (Wisconsin)
- Highway 89 (Wisconsin)
- Highway 92 (Wisconsin)
- Highway 104 (Wisconsin)
- Highway 106 (Wisconsin)
- Highway 113 (Wisconsin)
- Highway 134 (Wisconsin)
- Highway 138 (Wisconsin)
- Highway 188 (Wisconsin)

=== Railroads ===
Freight

- Canadian Pacific
- Wisconsin and Southern Railroad

=== Buses ===
Public Transit

- Metro Transit

Intercity

- Van Galder/Coach USA
- Wisconsin Coach Lines/Coach USA
- Greyhound Lines
- Flixbus
- Badger Bus
- Jefferson Lines
- Lamers Connect
- Megabus

=== Airports ===
Commercial

- Dane County Regional Airport (MSN)

General Aviation

- Blackhawk Airfield (87Y)
- Middleton Municipal Airport (C29)
- Verona Airport (W19)
- Waunakee Airport (6P3)

=== Adjacent counties ===
- Columbia County (north)
- Dodge County (northeast)
- Green County (south)
- Iowa County (west)
- Jefferson County (east)
- Rock County (southeast)
- Sauk County (northwest)

== Demographics ==
Historical population
Census	Pop.	Note	%±
1840	314		—
1850	16,639		5,199.0%
1860	43,922		164.0%
1870	53,096		20.9%
1880	53,233		0.3%
1890	59,578		11.9%
1900	69,435		16.5%
1910	77,435		11.5%
1920	89,432		15.5%
1930	112,737		26.1%
1940	130,660		15.9%
1950	169,357		29.6%
1960	222,095		31.1%
1970	290,272		30.7%
1980	323,545		11.5%
1990	367,085		13.5%
2000	426,526		16.2%
2010	488,073		14.4%
2020	561,504		15.0%
2025 (est.)	590,375	▲	5.1%
U.S. Decennial Census; 1790–1960 1900–1990; 1990–2000 2010–2020 2020 census

In 2017, there were 5,891 births, giving a general fertility rate of 51.7 births per 1000 women aged 15–44, the eighth lowest rate out of all 72 Wisconsin counties. Of these, 73 of the births occurred at home, the fifth highest number of home births for Wisconsin counties. 428 of the births were to mothers who held doctorate or professional degrees, more than any other Wisconsin county. These accounted for 7.3% of total births for the county, a higher percent than any other Wisconsin county and more than Ozaukee County which had 5.8% of births to mothers who held doctorate or professional degrees and ranked second.

=== Racial and ethnic composition ===
Dane County, Wisconsin – Racial and ethnic composition Note: the US Census treats Hispanic/Latino as an ethnic category. This table excludes Latinos from the racial categories and assigns them to a separate category. Hispanics/Latinos may be of any race.
Race / Ethnicity (NH = Non-Hispanic)	Pop 1980	Pop 1990	Pop 2000	Pop 2010	Pop 2020	% 1980	% 1990	% 2000	% 2010	% 2020
White alone (NH)	309,134	341,057	372,597	399,488	426,721	95.55%	92.91%	87.36%	81.85%	76.00%
Black or African American alone (NH)	5,648	10,303	16,829	24,717	29,742	1.75%	2.81%	3.95%	5.06%	5.30%
Native American or Alaska Native alone (NH)	739	1,122	1,198	1,338	1,275	0.23%	0.31%	0.28%	0.27%	0.23%
Asian alone (NH)	3,310	8,546	14,651	22,903	35,592	1.02%	2.33%	3.43%	4.69%	6.34%
Native Hawaiian or Pacific Islander alone (NH)	x	x	122	145	214	x	x	0.03%	0.03%	0.04%
Other race alone (NH)	1,434	313	510	628	2,103	0.44%	0.09%	0.12%	0.13%	0.37%
Mixed race or Multiracial (NH)	x	x	6,232	9,929	23,903	x	x	1.46%	2.03%	4.26%
Hispanic or Latino (any race)	3,280	5,744	14,387	28,925	41,954	1.01%	1.56%	3.37%	5.93%	7.47%
Total	323,545	367,085	426,526	488,073	561,504	100.00%	100.00%	100.00%	100.00%	100.00%

=== 2020 census ===
As of the 2020 census, the county had a population of 561,504. The population density was 469.3 inhabitants per square mile (181.2/km^{2}). There were 248,795 housing units at an average density of 207.9 units per square mile (80.3 units/km^{2}).

There were 238,417 households in the county, of which 25.7% had children under the age of 18 living in them. Of all households, 43.2% were married-couple households, 21.7% were households with a male householder and no spouse or partner present, and 26.7% were households with a female householder and no spouse or partner present. About 32.5% of all households were made up of individuals and 9.7% had someone living alone who was 65 years of age or older.

The median age was 35.7 years. 20.1% of residents were under the age of 18 and 14.7% of residents were 65 years of age or older. For every 100 females there were 98.5 males, and for every 100 females age 18 and over there were 96.9 males age 18 and over.

The racial makeup of the county was 77.6% White, 5.4% Black or African American, 0.4% American Indian and Alaska Native, 6.4% Asian, <0.1% Native Hawaiian and Pacific Islander, 3.2% from some other race, and 6.9% from two or more races. Hispanic or Latino residents of any race comprised 7.5% of the population.

86.4% of residents lived in urban areas, while 13.6% lived in rural areas. Among the 248,795 housing units, 4.2% were vacant. Among occupied housing units, 56.3% were owner-occupied and 43.7% were renter-occupied. The homeowner vacancy rate was 0.8% and the rental vacancy rate was 3.9%.

=== 2010 census ===
At the 2010 census there were 488,073 people, 203,750 households, and 116,752 families living in the county. The population density was 394 people per square mile (152 people/km^{2}). There were 216,022 housing units at an average density of 174 units per square mile (67 units/km^{2}). The racial makeup of the county was 84.7% White, 5.2% Black or African American, 0.4% Native American, 4.7% Asian, 0.03% Pacific Islander, 2.5% from other races, and 2.5% from two or more races. 5.9% of the population were Hispanic or Latino of any race. Of the 203,750 households 27.0% had children under the age of 18 living with them, 45.1% were married couples living together, 8.6% had a female householder with no husband present, and 42.7% were non-families. 30.5% of households were one person and 7.7% were one person aged 65 or older. The average household size was 2.33 and the average family size was 2.95.

The age distribution was 21.7% under the age of 18, 12.8% from 18 to 24, 29.5% from 25 to 44, 25.7% from 45 to 64, and 10.3% 65 or older. The median age was 34.4 years. For every 100 females, there were 97.80 males. For every 100 females age 18 and over, there were 96.00 males.

2000 Census Age Pyramid for Dane County.

=== 2000 census ===
At the 2000 census there were 426,526 people, 173,484 households, and 100,794 families living in the county. The population density was 355 people per square mile (137 people/km^{2}). There were 180,398 housing units at an average density of 150 units per square mile (58 units/km^{2}). The racial makeup of the county was 88.96% White, 4.00% Black or African American, 0.33% Native American, 3.45% Asian, 0.03% Pacific Islander, 1.43% from other races, and 1.79% from two or more races. 3.37% of the population were Hispanic or Latino of any race. 34.4% were of German, 11.5% Norwegian, 8.9% Irish and 6.0% English ancestry. Of the 173,484 households 29.00% had children under the age of 18 living with them, 47.10% were married couples living together, 7.90% had a female householder with no husband present, and 41.90% were non-families. 29.40% of households were one person and 7.00% were one person aged 65 or older. The average household size was 2.37 and the average family size was 2.97.

The age distribution was 22.60% under the age of 18, 14.30% from 18 to 24, 32.50% from 25 to 44, 21.30% from 45 to 64, and 9.30% 65 or older. The median age was 33 years. For every 100 females, there were 97.90 males. For every 100 females age 18 and over, there were 96.00 males.

=== Religion ===
In 2010, the largest religious groups in Dane County by number of adherents were Catholic at 106,036 adherents, ELCA Lutheran at 48,620 adherents, United Methodist at 9,753 adherents, non-denominational Christian at 7,448 adherents, Evangelical Free at 6,075 adherents, United Church of Christ at 5,035 adherents, Wisconsin Synod Lutheran at 4,214 adherents, Missouri Synod Lutheran at 3,921 adherents, American Baptist at 3,755 adherents, and PC-USA Presbyterian at 3,664 adherents.

== Government ==
Dane County is governed by a county executive and a county board of supervisors. The county executive is elected in a countywide vote. The county executive is Melissa Agard. The board of supervisors consists of 37 members, each elected from single member districts. As the policy-making body of the county government, the board of supervisors enacts county ordinances, levies taxes, and appropriates money for services.

== Economy ==
Dane County's recent growth has been driven by new job opportunities in healthcare and technology fields.

== Politics ==
United States presidential election results for Dane County, Wisconsin
Year	Republican		Democratic		Third party(ies)	
Year	No.	%	No.	%	No.	%
1892	6,445	44.93%	6,833	47.63%	1,068	7.44%
1896	9,080	56.10%	6,521	40.29%	585	3.61%
1900	9,396	58.41%	6,129	38.10%	562	3.49%
1904	11,041	63.51%	5,679	32.66%	666	3.83%
1908	9,441	52.42%	7,818	43.41%	750	4.16%
1912	5,244	32.27%	9,017	55.49%	1,989	12.24%
1916	6,931	40.13%	9,859	57.08%	483	2.80%
1920	22,842	77.46%	4,879	16.55%	1,767	5.99%
1924	12,280	31.32%	2,081	5.31%	24,847	63.37%
1928	23,680	54.85%	19,126	44.30%	364	0.84%
1932	19,083	39.90%	26,841	56.13%	1,899	3.97%
1936	15,233	28.79%	35,856	67.77%	1,819	3.44%
1940	21,845	34.79%	40,331	64.23%	611	0.97%
1944	23,021	37.96%	37,076	61.13%	554	0.91%
1948	22,934	37.80%	35,486	58.50%	2,244	3.70%
1952	38,724	50.34%	37,987	49.38%	216	0.28%
1956	38,955	51.11%	36,891	48.41%	367	0.48%
1960	43,245	47.78%	47,045	51.98%	212	0.23%
1964	27,124	28.42%	68,118	71.38%	184	0.19%
1968	39,917	38.36%	59,951	57.61%	4,193	4.03%
1972	56,020	40.88%	79,567	58.07%	1,439	1.05%
1976	63,466	41.60%	82,321	53.96%	6,765	4.43%
1980	57,545	34.17%	85,609	50.84%	25,251	14.99%
1984	74,823	43.84%	94,659	55.46%	1,203	0.70%
1988	69,143	39.30%	105,414	59.92%	1,377	0.78%
1992	61,957	29.49%	114,724	54.60%	33,441	15.92%
1996	59,487	30.93%	109,347	56.86%	23,468	12.20%
2000	75,790	32.56%	142,317	61.15%	14,632	6.29%
2004	90,369	32.95%	181,052	66.02%	2,828	1.03%
2008	73,065	25.82%	205,984	72.80%	3,890	1.37%
2012	83,644	27.50%	216,071	71.03%	4,466	1.47%
2016	71,275	23.04%	217,697	70.37%	20,382	6.59%
2020	78,794	22.86%	260,121	75.46%	5,813	1.69%
2024	85,454	23.35%	273,995	74.88%	6,480	1.77%

Like most other counties anchored by an urban population center and a large public university, Dane County is solidly Democratic, with a long history in the progressive movement. It has backed the Democratic presidential nominee in every election since 1932 with the exception of the two nationwide landslide victories of Dwight D. Eisenhower in 1952 and 1956, and even then, Eisenhower's margin of victory was under 3% both times. Since then, Republicans have only crossed the 35% mark six times. Within Wisconsin, only the predominantly Native American county of Menominee is more reliably Democratic.

In state elections, the county is no less Democratic. The last Republicans the county supported at state level were Governor Tommy Thompson and Treasurer Jack Voight in 1994. The last Republican Senator to carry the county was Alexander Wiley in 1956 by less than one percent, 10 years earlier the county was the only one in the state to not vote for Republican Senator Joseph McCarthy. In the three-party era of 1930s-1940s, the county backed Wisconsin Progressive Party - National Progressives candidates, such as the La Follette brothers, Orland Steen Loomis and Herman Ekern.

=== County executives ===
- George Reinke, 1973–1981
- Jonathan B. Barry, 1981–1988
- Richard J. Phelps, 1988–1997
- Kathleen Falk, April 21, 1997 – April 18, 2011
- Joe Parisi, April 18, 2011 – May 3, 2024
- Patrick Miles (acting), May 3, 2024 – May 17, 2024
- Jamie Kuhn (interim), May 17, 2024 – November 13, 2024
- Melissa Agard, November 13, 2024 – present

== Recreation ==
=== County parks ===
- Anderson Farm County Park
- Babcock County Park
- Badger Prairie County Park
- Brigham County Park
- CamRock County Park
- Donald County Park
- Festge County Park
- Fish Camp County Park
- Fish Lake County Park
- Goodland County Park
- Indian Lake County Park
- Jenni & Kyle Preserve
- La Follette County Park
- Lake View Hill Park
- Lussier County Park
- McCarthy Youth & Conservation County Park
- Mendota County Park
- Prairie Moraine County Park
- Salmo Pond County Park
- SIlverwood County Park
- Stewart Lake County Park
- Token Creek County Park
- Viking County Park
- Walking Iron County Park
- William G. Lunney Lake Farm County Park
- Yahara Heights County Park

== Communities ==
Political map of Dane County as of the 2020 Census

=== Cities ===
Cities are incorporated, generally have a mayor (or a administrator/manager), an elected council, and generally provide more services than smaller administrative divisions.

- Edgerton (mostly in Rock County)
- Fitchburg
- Madison (county seat)
- Middleton
- Monona
- Stoughton
- Sun Prairie (city)
- Verona

=== Villages ===
Villages are incorporated, are governed by a Village President and Board of Trustees, and provide residential services.

- Belleville (partly in Green County)
- Black Earth
- Blue Mounds
- Brooklyn (partly in Green County)
- Cambridge (partly in Jefferson County)
- Cottage Grove
- Cross Plains
- Dane
- Deerfield
- DeForest
- Maple Bluff
- Marshall
- Mazomanie
- McFarland
- Mount Horeb
- Oregon
- Rockdale
- Shorewood Hills
- Waunakee
- Windsor

=== Towns ===
Towns may have the same name as a city or village associated with it, but it is a separate municipality. Towns are not incorporated, are governed by a town board, and only provide limited services to residents.

- Albion
- Berry
- Black Earth (town)
- Blooming Grove
- Blue Mounds (town)
- Bristol
- Burke
- Christiana
- Cottage Grove (town)
- Cross Plains
- Dane
- Deerfield (town)
- Dunkirk
- Dunn
- Mazomanie (town)
- Medina
- Middleton (town)
- Montrose
- Oregon (town)
- Perry
- Pleasant Springs
- Primrose
- Roxbury
- Rutland
- Springdale
- Springfield
- Sun Prairie (town)
- Vermont
- Verona
- Vienna
- Westport
- York

=== Unincorporated communities ===
Unincorporated communities are smaller communities that are governed by the town they are located in and often exist as nomenclature in vital records.

- Albion
- Aldens Corners
- Ashton
- Basco
- Burke
- Daleyville
- Deansville
- Door Creek
- Dunkirk
- East Bristol
- Elvers
- Five Points
- Forward
- Hanerville
- Highwood
- Hillside
- Hoffman Corners
- Indian Heights
- Kegonsa
- Kingsley Corners
- Klevenville
- London (partial)
- Lutheran Hill
- Martinsville
- Marxville
- Montrose
- Mt. Vernon
- Nora
- Norway Grove
- Old Deerfield
- Paoli
- Pierceville
- Pine Bluff
- Primrose
- Riley
- Roxbury
- Rutland
- Seminary Springs
- Schey Acres
- Springfield Corners
- Stone
- Token Creek
- Utica
- Vermont
- Vilas
- West Middleton
- York Center

=== Neighborhoods ===
Neighborhoods exist mostly for nomenclature purposes; some may have administrative associations with powers that are defined in the property deed covenants of the neighborhood. This is a partial list that primarily consists of former unincorporated communities that are now within the boundaries of an incorporated city or village.

- Hope (Madison)
- Lake Windsor (Windsor)
- Fitchburg Center (Fitchburg)
- Middleton Junction (Madison)
- Morrisonville (Windsor)
- Oak Hall (Fitchburg)

=== Native American community ===
- Ho-Chunk Indian Reservation

== Education ==
School districts (all K-12) include:

- Barneveld School District
- Belleville School District
- Cambridge School District
- Columbus School District
- DeForest Area School District
- Deerfield Community School District
- Edgerton School District
- Evansville Community School District
- Lodi School District
- Madison Metropolitan School District
- Marshall School District
- McFarland School District
- Middleton-Cross Plains School District
- Monona Grove School District
- Mount Horeb Area School District
- New Glarus School District
- Oregon School District
- Pecatonica Area School District
- Poynette School District
- River Valley School District
- Sauk Prairie School District
- Stoughton Area School District
- Sun Prairie Area School District
- Verona Area School District
- Waterloo School District
- Waunakee Community School District
- Wisconsin Heights School District

== See also ==
- National Register of Historic Places listings in Dane County, Wisconsin
- Madison (town), Wisconsin - Dissoluted town in 2022
