= National Register of Historic Places listings in Dane County, Wisconsin =

Location of Dane County in Wisconsin

This is a list of the National Register of Historic Places listings in Dane County, Wisconsin. It aims to provide a comprehensive listing of buildings, sites, structures, districts, and objects in Dane County, Wisconsin listed on the National Register of Historic Places.

The locations of National Register properties for which the latitude and longitude coordinates are included below may be seen in a map.

There are 265 properties and districts listed on the National Register in Dane County, including 10 National Historic Landmarks. 158 of these properties and districts, including 8 of the National Historic Landmarks, are located in the city of Madison; these are listed separately, while the remaining 107 properties and districts are listed below. An additional site was once listed on the National Register but has been removed.

This National Park Service list is complete through NPS recent listings posted July 24, 2026.

== Current listings ==
	Name on the Register	Image	Date listed	Location	City or town	Description
1	Francis Marian Ames Farmstead	Francis Marian Ames Farmstead	November 5, 1992 (#92001555)	221 US 14; 42°51′26″N 89°20′40″W	Rutland	Queen Anne-style house decorated with bargeboards, spindled porch and lead glass windows, built in 1892, and some outbuildings.
2	Bedrud-Olson Farmstead	Bedrud-Olson Farmstead	April 1, 1999 (#99000429)	996 E. Church Rd. 42°57′12″N 89°05′14″W	Christiana	Largely intact tobacco and dairy farm, with 1883 dairy barn, three tobacco-curing sheds built around 1890, and a tobacco-stripping shed built in 1910.
3	Belleville Illinois Central Railroad Depot	Belleville Illinois Central Railroad Depot	December 6, 2016 (#16000831)	109 S. Park St. 42°51′31″N 89°31′58″W	Belleville	Italianate-styled depot built in 1887-88 by the Illinois Central Railroad. Passenger service stopped in 1931 - freight in 1943.
4	Bram Mound Group	Bram Mound Group	March 25, 1993 (#93000216)	Address Restricted	Dunn	3 linear mounds and 1 low conical mound near Lake Waubesa.
5	Brown-Sewell House	Brown-Sewell House	April 22, 2003 (#03000307)	101 S. Fifth St. 42°55′05″N 89°12′59″W	Stoughton	Greek Revival-styled house built in 1859 for Lyman Brown. Later owned by Rev. Robert Sewell and Elizabeth, of First Congregational Church.
6	Cambridge Public School and High School	Cambridge Public School and High School	June 23, 1998 (#98000708)	103 South St. 43°00′06″N 89°00′54″W	Cambridge	2-story red brick Georgian Revival/Romanesque Revival school built in 1906, after the previous wooden school burned.
7	Chase Grain Elevator	Chase Grain Elevator	August 12, 2010 (#10000540)	123 Railroad St. 43°10′43″N 89°12′53″W	Sun Prairie	Small-town grain storage structure built along a rail line in 1922. The previous wooden elevator on this site burned, so the silos of this elevator were rebuilt of tile, aiming to avoid another fire.
8	Jens and Ingeborg Cold House	Jens and Ingeborg Cold House	March 26, 2003 (#03000169)	111 S Fifth St. 42°55′05″N 89°12′58″W	Stoughton	The side-gabled, 1.5-story section was built in 1858. The 2-story Queen Anne-styled section with the tower was added in 1892, when that style was in vogue.
9	College Hills Historic District	College Hills Historic District	December 9, 2002 (#02001518)	Roughly bounded by Columbia Rd., Amherst Dr., Bowdoin Rd., Corporate Limit, University Bay, and Harvard Dr. 43°04′45″N 89°26′20″W	Shorewood Hills	Residential neighborhood developed starting in 1914, with views of Lake Mendota and the UW campus, with most homes in Prairie School, Craftsman, and period revival styles.
10	Dr. Charles G. Crosse House	Dr. Charles G. Crosse House	February 24, 1993 (#93000029)	133 W. Main St. 43°10′59″N 89°12′54″W	Sun Prairie	Carpenter Gothic-style house with ornate bargeboards built ca. 1865. Charles was an early doctor, newspaper-man, civic leader, and state legislator.
11	Henry L. and Sarah Dahle House	Henry L. and Sarah Dahle House	November 26, 2003 (#03001218)	312 S. Fourth St. 43°00′16″N 89°44′07″W	Mount Horeb	Prairie style home with wide eaves and brick and stucco exterior, designed by Claude and Starck and built in 1916. Henry was involved in his family's businesses.
12	Herman B. and Anne Marie Dahle House	Herman B. and Anne Marie Dahle House	November 26, 2003 (#03001217)	200 N. Second St. 43°00′39″N 89°44′19″W	Mount Horeb	Grand Classical Revival home with porch framed in 2-story columns and pediment, designed by James O. Gordon and built in 1911. Herman and his brothers ran a general store and bank in Mount Horeb.
13	Onon B. and Betsy Dahle House	Onon B. and Betsy Dahle House	April 16, 2008 (#08000322)	10779 Evergreen Ave. 42°54′57″N 89°48′56″W	Perry	Greek Revival/Italianate-style home built in 1864 by the Norwegian immigrant for whom Daleyville is named. Onon started the first general store there and became a civic leader.
14	Depot Hill Historic District	Depot Hill Historic District	November 22, 2021 (#98000222)	Roughly along E. Main St. 42°55′01″N 89°12′57″W	Stoughton	Small commercial district, including the 1885 Lee Tobacco Warehouse, the 1885 Turner and Atkinson Tobacco Warehouse, the 1891 Kittilson Tobacco Warehouse, the 1891 Hanson Hotel, the 1891 Ellingson Saloon, the 1895 Italianate-style CM&SP Depot, the 1902 Gothic Revival-style Pabst Brewing Co. Saloon Building, the 1913 Craftsman-style CM&SP Depot, the 1912-1926 Standard Oil Co. Filling Station, and the 1927 Art Moderne-style auto showroom at 501 E. Main.
15	John Sweet Donald Farmstead	John Sweet Donald Farmstead	June 7, 1984 (#84003633)	1972 WI 92; 42°57′52″N 89°41′08″W	Springdale	Farm begun in 1855 by Presbyterian minister and his family. His grandson John later ran the farm while serving in the state legislature as a Progressive Republican and an agriculture educator.
16	Adam Dunlap Farmstead	Adam Dunlap Farmstead	November 15, 2001 (#01001242)	9646 Dunlap Hollow Rd. 43°12′28″N 89°43′53″W	Mazomanie	Early farm begun in 1846 by Yankees from New York state. Stone structures survive that were built around 1848: the Greek Revival-styled house, a barn, and an ice house/spring house.
17	Dunroven House	Dunroven House	November 28, 1980 (#80000120)	7801 Dunroven Rd. 43°17′04″N 89°28′23″W	Dane	Tobacco/dairy farm begun around 1870 by Abram Asa Boyce, who later served in the state legislature. About 1910 E.W. de Bower expanded the house to grand Colonial Revival style. Sandstone powerhouse stands behind.
18	East End Historic District	East End Historic District	July 25, 2003 (#03000699)	7002-7016 Hubbard Ave., 1812-1916 Park St. (even only) 7002-7227,7233,7235,7237 Elmwood Ave. 43°05′45″N 89°30′12″W	Middleton	Neighborhood of modest houses built from the 1920s to 1950s in styles of that era - mostly period revival with a few bungalows.
19	East Park Historic District	East Park Historic District	May 1, 2003 (#03000335)	108-324 S. Lynn St., 700-816 Park St., and East Park; 42°55′02″N 89°12′41″W	Stoughton	Neighborhood of modest homes, mostly built from 1913 to 1921, and mostly bungalows or Craftsman-styled.
20	East Side Historic District	East Side Historic District	January 9, 1997 (#96001577)	Roughly bounded by Ridge, Henry, Vernon, and Academy Sts. 42°55′06″N 89°12′31″W	Stoughton	Neighborhood of stylish homes built mostly from 1890 to 1915, with the majority styled Queen Anne.
21	Edwards-Larson House	Edwards-Larson House	November 18, 2021 (#100007138)	6003 Exchange St. 43°00′45″N 89°17′24″W	McFarland	Queen Anne-style house built in 1898, probably by Sure Johnson, with shingles in the gable ends and an elaborate front porch. Home of E.N. Edwards, Tollef Olson and John O. Larson. Now restored as a house museum.
22	First Lutheran Church	First Lutheran Church	June 16, 1988 (#88000728)	Pleasant View Rd. at Old Sauk Rd. 43°04′31″N 89°32′11″W	Middleton	Gothic Revival-styled church built by a German congregation in 1866, with its steeple expanded in 1885.
23	First National Bank	First National Bank	October 16, 2007 (#07001096)	113 N. Main St. 42°55′36″N 89°23′04″W	Oregon	Small Neoclassical-styled bank built in 1914, which operated until 1929 when it closed after the stock market crash that led to the Great Depression.
24	First Unitarian Society Meeting House	First Unitarian Society Meeting House	April 11, 1973 (#73000076)	900 University Bay Dr. 43°04′34″N 89°26′04″W	Shorewood Hills	Dramatic building designed by Frank Lloyd Wright for his own Unitarian congregation. Built 1949-51.
25	Fort Blue Mounds	Fort Blue Mounds	September 24, 2001 (#01001044)	Address Restricted	Blue Mounds	Site where in 1832 Colonel Ebenezer Brigham and residents of Blue Mounds, on hearing events of the Black Hawk War, threw up an oak stockade for refuge.
26	Fox Hall	Fox Hall	December 1, 1983 (#83004273)	5183 County Hwy. M 42°56′57″N 89°24′01″W	Fitchburg	Intact grand farmhouse built in 1856 for Irish immigrant George Fox, with walls of local sandstone and an unusual frieze-bracket-window arrangement under the eaves. Stayed in the Fox family for many generations.
27	Frey School	Frey School	July 14, 2011 (#11000461)	8847 County Road Y 43°14′58″N 89°40′19″W	Roxbury	Intact one-room school with sandstone walls built in 1870.
28	John Fritz Farmstead	John Fritz Farmstead	July 15, 1998 (#98000879)	642 Fritz Rd. 42°53′24″N 89°35′46″W	Montrose	Early farm begun by Bavarian immigrant Fritz and his family. Still extant are the 1853 farmhouse, a basement barn from the late 1800s, and a granary built around 1900.
29	Frost Woods Historic District	Frost Woods Historic District	February 23, 2026 (#100012743)	Roughly bounded by Panther Trail, Pheasant Hill Road, Owen Road, Bridge Road, Graham Drive, and Lake Monona; 43°03′22″N 89°20′06″W	Monona	Neighborhood on the southeast side of Lake Monona, including many Ranch-style homes like the 1956 Paul house, but also others like the 1937 International-style Ragsdale house, the 1948 Colonial Revival Harker house, and the 1948 Usonian-style Cline house. The HOA has long focused on preserving the neighborhood's natural beauty.
30	Fuhremann Canning Company Factory	Fuhremann Canning Company Factory	September 15, 2004 (#04001003)	151 Market St. 43°10′51″N 89°12′40″W	Sun Prairie	3-story utilitarian-styled factory built of wood in 1912, and clad in brick in 1943, where locally-grown peas and corn were graded, picked, canned, and many shipped out on the nearby Milwaukee Road. Operated until 2000.
31	John and Flora Gilbert House	John and Flora Gilbert House	September 6, 2007 (#07000933)	357 N. Main St. 42°55′54″N 89°23′02″W	Oregon	Classic Queen Anne-style house built in 1906 by retired farmer John Gilbert.
32	Gonstead Clinic of Chiropractic	Gonstead Clinic of Chiropractic	April 7, 2023 (#100008271)	1505 Springdale St. 43°00′36″N 89°43′13″W	Mount Horeb	Wrightian-styled clinic designed by John Steinmann and built in 1964 for nationally-known chiropractor Clarence Gonstead. The building's footprint represents the human spinal column.
33	Sereno W. Graves House	Sereno W. Graves House	September 29, 1982 (#82000651)	4006 Old Stage Rd. 42°51′49″N 89°18′50″W	Rutland	Greek Revival-styled house with limestone walls built by Vermont-native Graves in 1845 for his own family. Graves was later a state legislator.
34	Nicholas Haight Farmstead	Nicholas Haight Farmstead	October 29, 1993 (#93001162)	4926 Haight Farm Rd. 43°00′08″N 89°22′42″W	Fitchburg	Edwin Spooner of Massachusetts started the farm in 1852, building the first section of the Greek Revival-styled house around 1855. Haight bought the farm in 1867 and added the smokehouse, barn, corn crib and granary before 1900.
35	Samuel Hall House	Samuel Hall House	December 23, 1993 (#93001445)	974 Hillside Rd. 42°54′03″N 89°02′31″W	Albion	Greek Revival-style house with limestone walls built in 1856 for Hall, an English immigrant, Primitive Methodist, and farmer.
36	Hammond Farmstead	Hammond Farmstead	September 1, 2023 (#100009329)	3859 Vilas Rd. 43°03′34″N 89°12′36″W	Cottage Grove	Farm begun by Alexander and Caroline (Brown) Hammond in the 1840s, which transitioned from tobacco cultivation to dairy, operated by the family for 175 years. Includes the house with an 1846 section, 1901 dairy barn, 1910 milk house, and 1910 tobacco stripping house.
37	Hauge Log Church	Hauge Log Church	December 31, 1974 (#74000071)	1 mi (1.6 km). north of Daleyville on CR Z 42°55′48″N 89°49′13″W	Daleyville	Simple church built in 1852 by two competing strains of Norwegian Lutherans. Cooperation didn't last long. It was the first Norwegian Lutheran Church built in western Wisconsin.
38	Heim Mound	Heim Mound	March 31, 2004 (#04000254)	Address Restricted; 43°05′38″N 89°29′21″W	Middleton	Large effigy of a fox or wolf.
39	Heiney's Meat Market	Heiney's Meat Market	September 27, 1984 (#84003642)	1221 Mills St. 43°08′16″N 89°44′52″W	Black Earth	Victorian house built in 1869, to which David Heiney added a one story brick store for his meat market in 1911.
40	Hoff Department Store	Hoff Department Store	February 14, 1989 (#89000005)	101-103 Main St. 43°00′30″N 89°44′16″W	Mount Horeb	Block-long brick store built by Andrew Hoff 1916-17.
41	Hornung Mound Group	Hornung Mound Group	April 26, 1996 (#96000497)	Address Restricted	Roxbury	Group of effigy mounds including a bird, a bear, and water spirits - unusual because not near a large body of water.
42	Samuel Hunt House	Samuel Hunt House	September 30, 1982 (#82000652)	632 Center Rd. 42°52′51″N 89°18′35″W	Rutland	Italianate-styled house with walls of coursed sandstone, built in 1855, probably designed by Sereno Graves.
43	Gaute Ingebretson Loft House	Gaute Ingebretson Loft House	March 13, 1987 (#87000437)	1212 Pleasant Hill Rd. 42°54′47″N 89°10′12″W	Stoughton	Traditional Norwegian log house with dovetail joints and cantilevered loft, built around 1844, right after Gaute Ingebretson immigrated.
44	Iverson-Johnson House	Iverson-Johnson House	January 21, 1988 (#87002501)	327 E. Washington St. 42°55′02″N 89°13′00″W	Stoughton	Queen Anne-style home with unusual Nordic dragon-heads decorating the gable peaks, built in 1898 for a Norwegian-immigrant physician.
45	Gulbrand and Bertha Jensvold House	Gulbrand and Bertha Jensvold House	April 30, 2008 (#08000370)	1033 WI 78; 42°54′44″N 89°49′01″W	Perry	Limestone-walled farmhouse with elements of Gothic Revival style, built in 1869 just across from Perry Lutheran church for its teacher and "klokker."
46	Kehl Winery	Kehl Winery	January 2, 1976 (#76000056)	East of Prairie du Sac on WI 188; 43°17′19″N 89°42′27″W	Roxbury	Structures from German immigrant Peter Kehl's pioneer vineyard overlooking the Wisconsin River: 1857 barrel-vaulted wine cellar, 1858 house with fine stonework, and 1859 Italianate-styled brewery. Frost killed all Kehl's vines in 1899. Wollersheims restarted the winery in 1972.
47	John and Margarethe Kemp Cabin	John and Margarethe Kemp Cabin	December 10, 2008 (#08001187)	6950 WI Hwy. 78; 43°13′51″N 89°43′35″W	Mazomanie	Rustic log cabin built by a family of Prussian immigrants in 1863 on their homestead near the Wisconsin River.
48	Kohl's Food Store	Kohl's Food Store	September 16, 2022 (#100008139)	4207 Monona Dr. 43°04′30″N 89°19′34″W	Monona	Contemporary-style supermarket designed by Rasche, Schroeder, Spransy & Assoc. and built in 1968, with a curved roof over glue-laminated arches. Now a Habitat ReStore.
49	Friederich Kohlmann House	Friederich Kohlmann House	December 27, 1974 (#74000075)	West of Springfield Corners off WI 19; 43°11′10″N 89°38′22″W	Springfield Corners	Farmhouse built by a German immigrant in 1867, with walls of fieldstone carried in by Indians.
50	Robert M. LaFollette House	Robert M. LaFollette House	October 15, 1966 (#66000020)	733 Lakewood Blvd. 43°06′57″N 89°22′22″W	Maple Bluff	Italianate-styled home occupied in later life by the Wisconsin governor and Progressive reformer.
51	Lewis Mound Group (47-Da-74)	Lewis Mound Group (47-Da-74)	December 15, 1984 (#84000809)	Burma Road, in Indian Mound Park; 43°00′30″N 89°18′00″W	McFarland	Mounds created by Late Woodland people overlooking Lake Waubesa, including a bear effigy, a hook-shaped mound, and some geometric shapes.
52	Library Park	Library Park	January 26, 1981 (#81000038)	Bounded by Vine, Main, Park and Pearl Sts. 42°51′33″N 89°32′00″W	Belleville	Multi-purpose village hall built in 1894 on Belleville's village green.
53	Aslak Lie Cabin	Aslak Lie Cabin	April 3, 1986 (#86000622)	3022 County Trunk P 43°01′14″N 89°40′05″W	Mount Horeb	Two-story cabin built in 1848 by an immigrant master craftsman, mixing Norwegian folk construction with more modern American techniques.
54	Lincoln Street Historic District	Lincoln Street Historic District	April 12, 2006 (#06000276)	W. Lincoln St., bet. Main St. and Market St. 42°55′55″N 89°23′04″W	Oregon	Neighborhood of five intact historic homes built from 1871 to 1900.
55	Little Norway	Little Norway	March 16, 1998 (#98000169)	3576 CTH JG; 43°01′32″N 89°47′44″W	Blue Mounds	Private living history museum portraying a Norwegian farm. Closed in 2012.
56	Lockwood Barn	Lockwood Barn	September 29, 1982 (#82000653)	Old Stage Rd; 42°51′54″N 89°19′22″W	Rutland	Stone-walled bank barn built in 1855, designed by Sereno Graves.
57	Lower Mud Lake Archeological Complex	Lower Mud Lake Archeological Complex	March 31, 2004 (#04000253)	Address Restricted	Dunn	Three sites on the Yahara River: the Skare/Kouba site, where early Paleo-Indians settled; the remains of an Indian fish weir; and the 1840-1860 Douglas corduroy dam.
58	Main Street Historic District	Main Street Historic District	March 5, 2019 (#100003457)	100-225 E. Main St., 102 & 200-205 W. Main St., 103-105 S. 2nd St., and 102 S. 3rd St. 43°00′31″N 89°44′19″W	Mount Horeb	29 contributing buildings from the old downtown built from 1867 to 1948, including the 1889 Boomtown-style Kittleson & Co Hardware Store, the 1892 Mt. Horeb Bank, the 1919 Wolf Blacksmith Shop, and the 1924 Parkway Theater.
59	John Mann House	John Mann House	July 8, 1982 (#82000655)	6261 Nesbitt Rd. 43°00′34″N 89°28′44″W	Fitchburg	Italianate-styled farmhouse built in 1856. Now Quivey's Grove restaurant.
60	Maple Bluff Boy Scout Cabin	Maple Bluff Boy Scout Cabin	November 6, 2017 (#100001783)	296 Woodland Cir. 43°06′39″N 89°21′54″W	Maple Bluff	Log structure in Fireman's Park, built in 1943 during WWII by the community of Maple Bluff for its Boy Scout troop.
61	Mazomanie Downtown Historic District	Mazomanie Downtown Historic District	August 19, 1992 (#92000406)	1-118 Brodhead, 2-46 Hudson, 37-105 Crescent and 113 E. Exchange Sts. 43°10′32″N 89°47′36″W	Mazomanie	The old downtown, including the 1857 railroad depot, the 1857 Lynch and Walker Flouring Mill, the 1865 Parman blacksmith shop, the 1908 Hamm livery stable, the 1936 Community building, a few houses, and a lot of stores.
62	Mazomanie Town Hall	Mazomanie Town Hall	October 22, 1980 (#80000126)	51 Crescent St. 43°10′34″N 89°47′33″W	Mazomanie	Simple 2-story municipal building with walls of cut fieldstone blocks, built in 1878. Housed the fire department, town meeting hall, town clerk's office, dances, suppers and fund-raisers.
63	McCoy Farmhouse	McCoy Farmhouse	May 29, 1980 (#80000124)	South of Madison at 2925 Syene Rd. 43°00′51″N 89°23′49″W	Fitchburg	Italianate farmhouse built in 1861 on one of Wisconsin's first tobacco farms.
64	McFarland House	McFarland House	November 3, 1988 (#88002228)	5923 Exchange St. 43°00′48″N 89°17′19″W	McFarland	Large, simple Greek Revival house built in 1857 by William McFarland, who worked for the railroad then but settled down to be a community leader in the town that was named for him.
65	Middleton Depot, Chicago, Milwaukee, and St. Paul Railroad	Middleton Depot, Chicago, Milwaukee, and St. Paul Railroad	April 29, 1999 (#99000520)	1811 Parmenter St. 43°05′42″N 89°30′40″W	Middleton	Wooden late Victorian-styled depot designed under J. U. Nettenstrom and built in 1895.
66	Monona Mound (47DA275)	Monona Mound (47DA275)	December 1, 1989 (#89002064)	4009 Monona Dr. 43°04′56″N 89°19′29″W	Monona	water spirit effigy mound, 800-1100
67	Moore Mound Group	Moore Mound Group	August 5, 1993 (#93000809)	Address Restricted	Dunn	A group of three mounds near Lake Kegonsa. The largest mound is goose-shaped, while another is panther-shaped.
68	Mt. Horeb Opera Block	Mt. Horeb Opera Block	February 23, 1989 (#89000068)	109-117 E. Main St. 43°00′30″N 89°44′19″W	Mount Horeb	3-story Queen Anne-styled opera house built in 1895, which hosted plays, dances, theatrical troupes, political rallies, graduations, and movies.
69	Mount Horeb Public School	Mount Horeb Public School	May 28, 2010 (#10000298)	207 Academy St. 43°00′13″N 89°44′13″W	Mount Horeb	Prairie style school building designed by Claude & Starck and built in 1918.
70	Jens Naeset House	Jens Naeset House	March 14, 1985 (#85000577)	126 E. Washington; 42°55′04″N 89°13′09″W	Stoughton	Italianate-style house with Second Empire mansard roof, built in 1878 by Norwegian immigrant Naeset for his own family.
71	Northwest Side Historic District	Northwest Side Historic District	March 5, 1998 (#98000221)	Roughly bounded by Van Buren, Clyde, Grant, and Main Sts. 42°55′09″N 89°13′36″W	Stoughton	Old neighborhood with 251 contributing buildings built from 1854 to 1930, in various styles.
72	Oregon High School	Oregon High School	April 23, 1998 (#98000406)	220 N. Main St. 42°55′41″N 89°22′58″W	Oregon	Two-story public school designed in Collegiate Gothic style by Edward Tough and built in 1922.
73	Oregon Masonic Lodge	Oregon Masonic Lodge	June 18, 1992 (#92000803)	117-119 S. Main St. 42°55′33″N 89°23′06″W	Oregon	1898 store with Masons' hall in second story, with front elegantly decorated in multi-colored brick and red sandstone.
74	Oregon Water Tower and Pump House	Oregon Water Tower and Pump House	October 16, 2007 (#07001097)	134 Janesville St. 42°55′31″N 89°23′01″W	Oregon	100-foot steel water tower and brick pumphouse built in 1899 to address concerns over fire protection and water supply.
75	Outlet Mound	Outlet Mound	October 9, 2003 (#03001022)	Junction of Ridgewood and Midwood Aves. 43°03′06″N 89°20′05″W	Monona	Conical burial mound seven feet high, built perhaps 2,000 years ago at the outlet of Lake Monona.
76	Ray S. and Theo P. Owen House	Ray S. and Theo P. Owen House	October 25, 2022 (#100008108)	5805 Winnequah Rd. 43°03′23″N 89°20′13″W	Monona	Craftsman-style summer cottage designed by James and Edward Law and built above Lake Monona in 1911. Ray Owen was a professor of civil engineering at the UW. The similarly-styled house was added in 1932, designed by Theron Mandeville Woolson.
77	Paoli Co-Operative Creamery Company Plant	Paoli Co-Operative Creamery Company Plant	February 3, 2023 (#100008612)	6858 Paoli Rd. 42°55′46″N 89°31′25″W	Montrose	Rural creamery complex begun about 1925 by a local co-op of farmers. It was expanded in 1953, 1955, and 1961, adapting for milk, cheese and butter processing until it closed in 1980. Now reopened as Seven Acre Dairy Co.
78	Paoli Mills	Paoli Mills	March 30, 1979 (#79000337)	6890 Sun Valley Pkwy. 42°55′47″N 89°31′31″W	Paoli	4 mill buildings on a 5-acre (20,000 m^{2}) site along the Sugar River, including remains of an 1849 sawmill and a fairly intact flouring mill built in the 1860s.
79	Daniel Pond Farmhouse	Daniel Pond Farmhouse	June 30, 1980 (#80000128)	East of Brooklyn on U.S. 14; 42°50′58″N 89°20′02″W	Brooklyn	Limestone-walled farmhouse probably built in the late 1840s for one of the first settlers in Rutland.
80	Ole K. Roe House	Ole K. Roe House	September 7, 1984 (#84003652)	404 S. 5th St. 42°54′56″N 89°13′01″W	Stoughton	Large brick Queen Anne-style house with corner tower, built in 1892 by one of Stoughton's leading tobacco merchants.
81	Dr. Newman C. Rowley House	Dr. Newman C. Rowley House	April 29, 1999 (#99000518)	7410 Hubbard Ave. 43°05′43″N 89°30′32″W	Middleton	Fine brick house built in 1867 by Middleton's first doctor. Now a museum.
82	Rutland United Brethren in Christ Meeting House and Cemetery	Rutland United Brethren in Christ Meeting House and Cemetery	September 15, 2004 (#04001002)	687 US 14; 42°52′59″N 89°21′05″W	Rutland	Simple frame church with some Greek Revival details, built in 1852. This is where the United Brethren in Christ denomination organized in Wisconsin, in 1858.
83	St. Peter's Roman Catholic Church	St. Peter's Roman Catholic Church	September 23, 1980 (#80000130)	7121 County Highway K 43°08′23″N 89°32′27″W	Ashton	Large Neogothic-styled church with rose window, apses, and steeple, built in 1901 in a small farming community.
84	Schroeder-Bohrod House	Schroeder-Bohrod House	March 23, 2023 (#100008790)	4811 Tonyawatha Trail; 43°04′03″N 89°20′36″W	Monona	Tudor Revival-style house designed by Frank M. Riley and built in 1932 for Otto Schroeder, a prominent Madison undertaker. Artist Aaron Bohrod bought the place in 1959 and painted nature images inside. He also had Herbert Fritz Jr. design the 1959 Contemporary-style garage and art studio.
85	Frederick Schumann Farmstead	Frederick Schumann Farmstead	December 10, 1993 (#93001426)	8313 WI 19; 43°11′40″N 89°37′49″W	Berry	Well-preserved saltbox-shaped stone house built in 1878 by a German immigrant farm family.
86	Shorewood Historic District	Shorewood Historic District	November 29, 2002 (#02001432)	Roughly bounded by Lake Mendota Dr., Tallyho Ln., Shorewood Blvd., and the Blackhawk Country Club; 43°04′50″N 89°26′48″W	Shorewood Hills	Large neighborhood, with 247 contributing homes built between 1922 and 1963, including many Colonial Revival and Tudor Revival.
87	Siggelkow Park Mound Group (47-Da-504)	Siggelkow Park Mound Group (47-Da-504)	March 14, 1985 (#85000576)	Address Restricted	McFarland	1 linear mound and remnants of 2 others.
88	Eric and Jerome Skindrud Farm	Eric and Jerome Skindrud Farm	September 26, 1994 (#94001156)	3070 Town Hall Rd. 43°01′19″N 89°41′18″W	Springdale	Farm started in 1856, with an 1876 dairy barn that was progressive for its day. The farm is in a valley and retains early erosion-control structures installed by the ASC and CCCs in the 1930s.
89	Adam and Mary Smith House	Adam and Mary Smith House	April 30, 1998 (#98000434)	south corner of Smith's Crossing and Leopold Way; 43°09′47″N 89°15′53″W	Sun Prairie	Italianate house built in 1872 by Adam, an early carpenter, innkeeper, farmer, and civic leader.
90	South Main Street Historic District	South Main Street Historic District	June 15, 2000 (#00000699)	S. Main St., junction with Jefferson and Janesville Sts. 42°55′33″N 89°23′05″W	Oregon	11 surviving commercial buildings built from 1877 to 1915, plus the 1920 WWI memorial.
91	South School	South School	September 12, 1985 (#85002319)	1009 Summit Ave. 42°54′37″N 89°13′08″W	Stoughton	2.5-story public elementary school built in 1900, designed by Alan Darst Conover with a rather residential form and Queen Anne style to fit into the surrounding neighborhood. Now apartments.
92	Southwest Side Historic District	Southwest Side Historic District	December 22, 1997 (#97001554)	Roughly bounded by Lowell, S. Monroe, W. Main and S. Page Sts. 42°54′52″N 89°13′31″W	Stoughton	Residential neighborhood with over 100 contributing properties in various styles built as early as 1856. 1884 Ovren House is pictured.
93	Stoughton High School	Stoughton High School	January 17, 2002 (#01001476)	211 N. Forrest St. 42°55′09″N 89°13′07″W	Stoughton	Romanesque Revival-styled public high school built in 1892-93.
94	Stoughton Main Street Commercial Historic District	Stoughton Main Street Commercial Historic District	October 21, 1982 (#82001842)	Main St. from the Yahara River to Forest St. 42°55′01″N 89°13′14″W	Stoughton	36 historic business structures in the old downtown, ranging from the 1869 Masonic Hall, to the 6 matching Italianate stores built together after the fire of 1889, to the 1907 Neoclassical-styled Citizen's State Bank.
95	Stoughton Municipal Power Plant No.1	Stoughton Municipal Power Plant No.1	August 12, 2022 (#100008010)	601 South 4th St. 42°54′50″N 89°13′04″W	Stoughton	Brick structure built in 1911 with round-arched windows, abstracted pilasters at the corners, and a round-topped front parapet that hides a gable roof.
96	Stoughton Universalist Church	Stoughton Universalist Church	September 30, 1982 (#82000659)	324 S. Page St. 42°54′58″N 89°13′25″W	Stoughton	Greek Revival-styled church built in 1858 by Universalist congregation which had a woman pastor already in 1869.
97	Stricker Pond I Site (47 DA 424)	Stricker Pond I Site (47 DA 424)	July 16, 1979 (#79000069)	Address Restricted	Middleton	Late Woodland village site.
98	Sun Prairie Downtown Historic District	Sun Prairie Downtown Historic District	May 21, 2019 (#100003955)	100-245 E. Main St. 43°11′00″N 89°12′46″W	Sun Prairie	The core of the old downtown, including the 1887 Hein-Dott building, the 1889 Lewis Pharmacy, the 1891 Dott tavern, the 1895 Romanesque Revival City Hall (pictured), the 1896 Hotel Kleiner, the 1909 Neoclassical Lohneis-Weisensel Block, and the 1924 Georgian Revival Public Library.
99	Sun Prairie Water Tower	Sun Prairie Water Tower	April 6, 2000 (#00000360)	Junction of Columbus, Church and Cliff Sts. 43°11′14″N 89°12′39″W	Sun Prairie	Tower with 60-foot stone base built in 1899 by Frank Stegerwald & Lessner. The original wooden tank was replaced with a steel one around 1912.
100	Sure Johnson Mound Group	Sure Johnson Mound Group	May 26, 1994 (#94000537)	Address Restricted	McFarland	Nine linear and conical mounds remaining from a group between McFarland and Mud Lake.
101	Tompkins-Brindler Mound Group	Tompkins-Brindler Mound Group	October 9, 2003 (#03001023)	Monona Dr. 43°03′18″N 89°19′28″W	Monona	2 linear mounds remaining from a larger group.
102	Willard and Fern Tompkins House	Willard and Fern Tompkins House	November 14, 2023 (#100009539)	110 Henuah Circle; 43°03′31″N 89°20′13″W	Monona	International-style house with cubic massing, bands of windows, and little ornamentation, designed by Beatty and Strang of Madison and built in 1937 in Frost Woods.
103	Waubesa School	Waubesa School	July 17, 1997 (#97000806)	5979 Sigglekow Rd. 43°01′34″N 89°16′38″W	McFarland	Brick-clad, Craftsman-styled one-room school designed by Louis A. Harrison and built in 1920.
104	Waunakee Railroad Depot	Waunakee Railroad Depot	February 14, 1978 (#78000092)	South and Main Sts. 43°11′30″N 89°27′15″W	Waunakee	Small wooden depot of the Chicago and North Western Railway built in 1896.
105	West School	West School	January 22, 1992 (#91001992)	404 Garfield St. 42°54′52″N 89°13′30″W	Stoughton	2.5-story Romanesque Revival-styled brick school built in 1886 and expanded in 1905.
106	Wisconsin Heights Battlefield	Wisconsin Heights Battlefield	January 31, 2002 (#01001553)	0.4 mi (0.64 km) southeast of the junction of County Rd. Y and WI 78; 43°14′41″N 89°43′05″W	Roxbury	Ridges and swamps along the Wisconsin River where the next-to-last battle of the Black Hawk War was fought.
107	Wisconsin Industrial School for Girls	Wisconsin Industrial School for Girls	September 13, 1991 (#91001391)	5212 WI M 42°57′42″N 89°22′39″W	Fitchburg	Reform facility for wayward or delinquent girls, moved from Milwaukee in 1941. Each girl had her own room in a large "cottage" under the guidance of a matron.

== Former listing ==
	Name on the Register	Image	Date listed	Date removed	Location	City or town	Description
1	Savage House		September 17, 1980 (#80000392)	November 2, 2012	SR 1; 42°50′47″N 89°14′25″W	Stoughton	Built in 1848; burned in 1996.

== See also ==
- List of National Historic Landmarks in Wisconsin
- National Register of Historic Places listings in Wisconsin
- Listings in neighboring counties: Columbia, Dodge, Green, Iowa, Jefferson, Rock, Sauk
- National Historic Preservation Act of 1966
- Wisconsin Historical Society
