= South Main Street Historic District (Oregon, Wisconsin) =

Historic district in Wisconsin, United States

- U.S. National Register of Historic Places
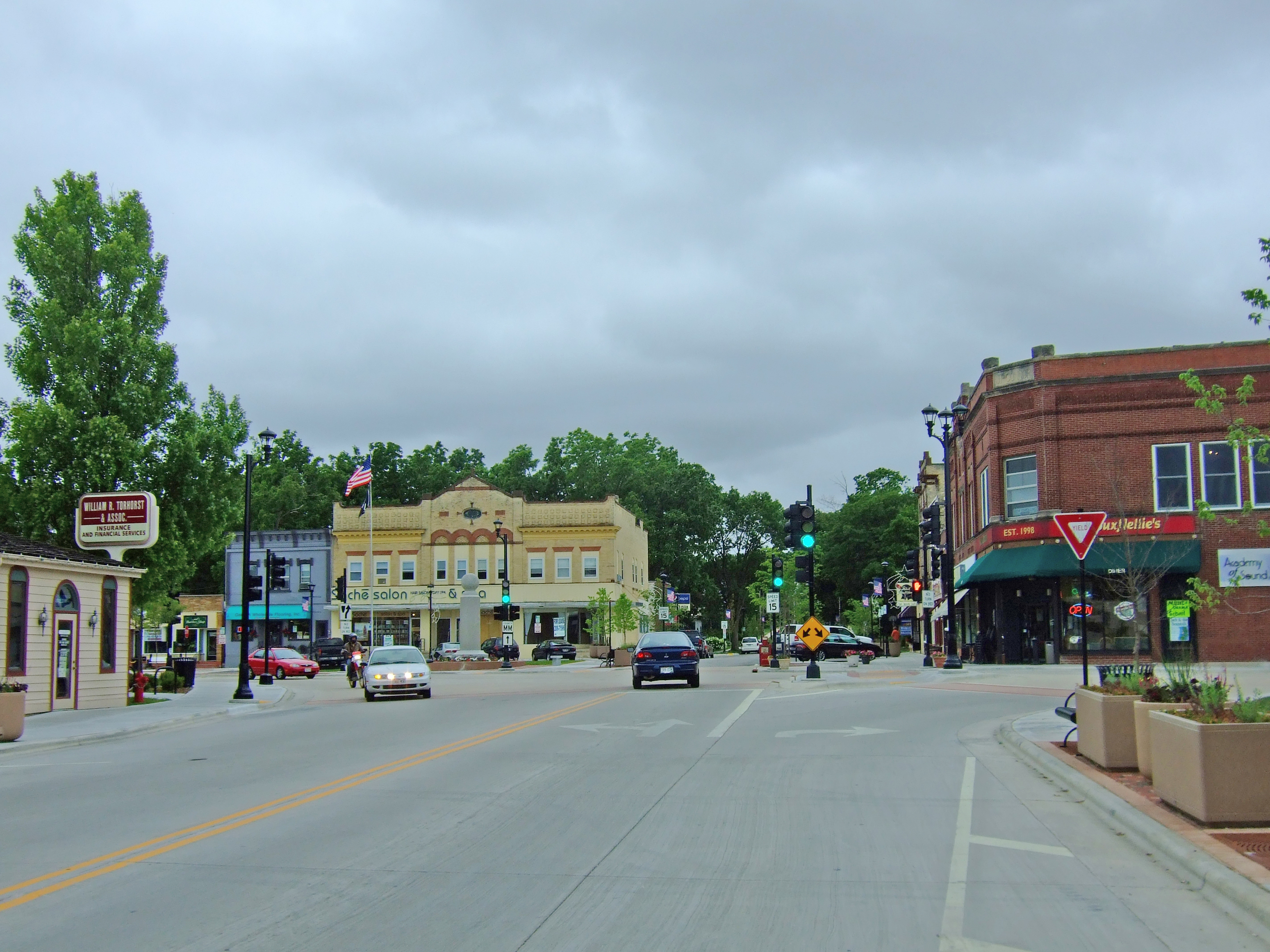
- A portion of the district.
- Location: S. Main St., jct. with Jefferson and Janesville Sts., Oregon, Wisconsin
- Area: 2 acres (0.81 ha)
- NRHP reference No.: 00000699
- Added to NRHP: June 15, 2000

The South Main Street Historic District is a surviving collection of eleven commercial buildings built from 1877 to 1915 in the old downtown of Oregon, Wisconsin, plus the WWI memorial. It was added to the State and the National Register of Historic Places in 2000.

The first house in what would become Oregon was built in 1842, a log cabin built for C.P. Mosely just east of what is now the Main Street district. The house became a tavern and a general store under I.M. Bennett. James Coville built another log house in 1843, just north of the district, and operated a shoe shop in it. A community grew there, called "Rome Corners." A post office was added in 1848, and a frame hotel called the Oregon Exchange in 1849.

In 1857 Charles Waterman had a village platted and called "Oregon." In 1864 the Beloit and Madison Railroad reached town, making Oregon a shipping point for the surrounding country. In 1883 the village incorporated, with over 500 inhabitants. The village continued to grow, adding a flour and grist mill in 1890, the first bank in 1892, a volunteer fire-fighting company in 1895, a water tower in 1898, a creamery in 1900, a telephone exchange in 1901, and paved streets in 1916. Some of the commercial buildings from this period of expansion survive, including:

- The C.E. Powers building at 115 S. Main Street was built in 1877 - a 2-story commercial vernacular brick building that still has its cast-iron columns in the street-level storefront. The top of the front wall is decorated with a brick cornice.
- The Cowdrey Tailor shop at 111 S. Main was built in 1878, trimmed with Italianate brickwork. In 1911 the facade was updated to a then-modern Broadfront style.
- The Howe Drug Store at 121 S. Main was built in 1880 with Italianate-styled cream brick, then updated to red and white brick in 1907, and then updated again in 1940 with an orange brick veneer.
- Howe Rental at 123 S. Main was also built in 1880, in a style that matched Howe's drug store next door. Its facade was updated in 1925.
- The Marvin Hardware store/Masonic Lodge at 117 South Main Street is a nicely decorated Romanesque Revival building erected in 1898, described in more detail in its own article.
- The Netherwood building at 104 Janesville Street (center left in the photo above) is another two-story, cream brick, Romanesque Revival building. Like the Masonic Lodge, red brick decorations contrast with the cream brick. Above the upper windows is a pressed metal cornice and a brick parapet.
- The McDermott building at 109 S. Main is a 2-story red-brick building with white stone trim above the windows and above that a corbelled parapet topped with light stone trim. It was built in 1899.
- The Montgomery & Martin/Observer building at 112 Janesville St. is a 2-story commercial vernacular office building with pressed metal window hoods and a pressed metal cornice. It was built in 1899.
- The Hausmann Brewing Company Saloon at 116 Janesville St. is a small commercial vernacular building erected in 1900 with the front wire-cut orange brick.
- The T.H. Grady Grocery at 134 S Main is a brick Modern Broadfront-style store built in 1915.
- The World War I Veterans Memorial at Janesville and Main is a nine-foot column of polished Hurricane Island granite, saved from Chicago's old city hall, and inscribed: "ERECTED IN HONOR OF THOSE WHO SERVED OUR COUNTRY IN THE WORLD WAR 1914-1918." It was dedicated June 10, 1920, and may be the first tribute to veterans erected after the war.
