= Heiney's Meat Market =

- U.S. National Register of Historic Places
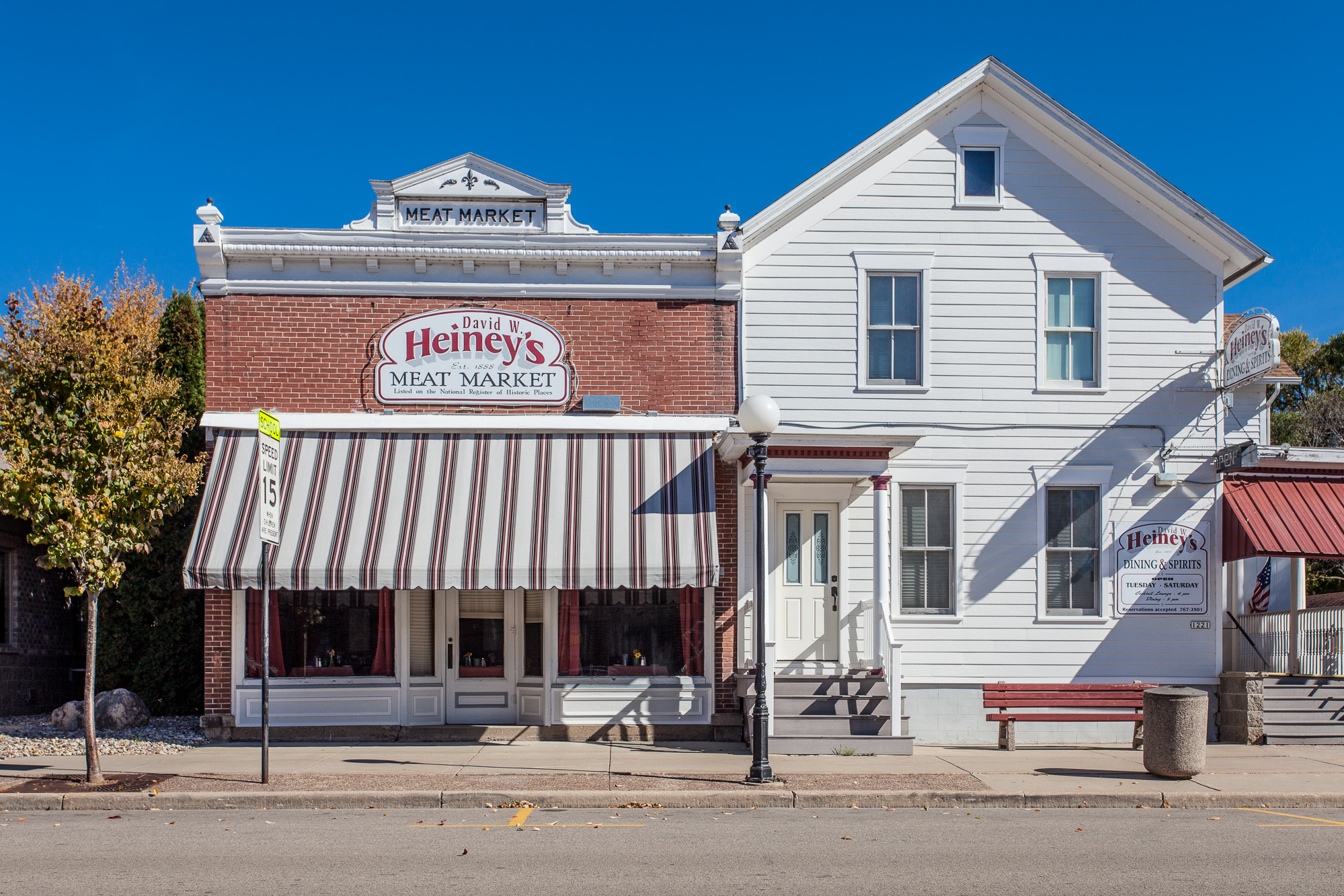
- Heineys Meat Market in 2012

- Location within Wisconsin
- Location: 1221 Mills St., Black Earth, Wisconsin
- Coordinates: 43°8′16″N 89°44′52″W
- Built: 1869
- Architect: Henry Piper, David W. Heiny
- Architectural style: Commercial Vernacular, Italianate
- NRHP reference No.: 84003642
- Added to NRHP: September 27, 1984

Heiney's Meat Market, also known as Corodonn's Meat Market Restaurant, is a former meat market and adjacent house located in the town of Black Earth, Wisconsin. The initial house was built in 1869, with later additions, and added to the National Register of Historic Places in 1984.

== History ==
Henry Piper built the two-story gable-roofed section in 1869 - basically a farmhouse with pediment-shaped window heads and the small portico over the front entry. In 1888 the house was purchased for $300 by David W. Heiney as he was traveling from Pennsylvania to Mazomanie to visit his father, on his honeymoon with his wife Emma. Heiney made extensive improvements, adding a floor to the residence, and that same year, opening Heiney's Meat Market in the basement. The business was immediately successful.

The market space was expanded in 1911 with a one-story addition. Additional buildings followed, including an icehouse, chicken coops, a lard rendering operation, a smokehouse, and a horse barn; of these, only the latter two buildings remain. The brick house was added in 1922 by David's son Ervin Heiney.

In 1919, Heiney's Meat Market was the site of a "secret meeting" to help Madison's newspaper The Capital Times, which was facing a boycott due to its political views. The meeting raised over $900 in stock pledges, which helped keep the newspaper afloat.

After David died in 1926, Ervin and his brother Wilford continued to run the meat market. By the time Ervin retired in the 1960s, it was the oldest family-owned business in town. After the last of the Heiney family died in 1967, the space was sold and converted to a television repair shop, then subsequently remained vacant for a while.

In 1977 Carol Moeller and Donna Obright purchased the property. They initially opened it as an antique shop, but soon after (in 1979) they renovated the property into a cocktail lounge and restaurant known as Corodonn's Meat Market.

It was Moeller and Obright who got the property listed on the National Register in 1984, after two years of research and red tape. It was listed under the name Heiney's Meat Market, after the original butcher shop owner. It was the first property in Black Earth to be named to the National Register of Historic Places.

In 1994 the restaurant was purchased by new owners. In 2014 after 20 years of operation, they decided to sell the place, but had difficulty in finding buyers. In 2015–2016, the property was converted to apartments.

== See also ==
- National Register of Historic Places listings in Dane County, Wisconsin
