= First National Bank (Oregon, Wisconsin) =

- U.S. National Register of Historic Places
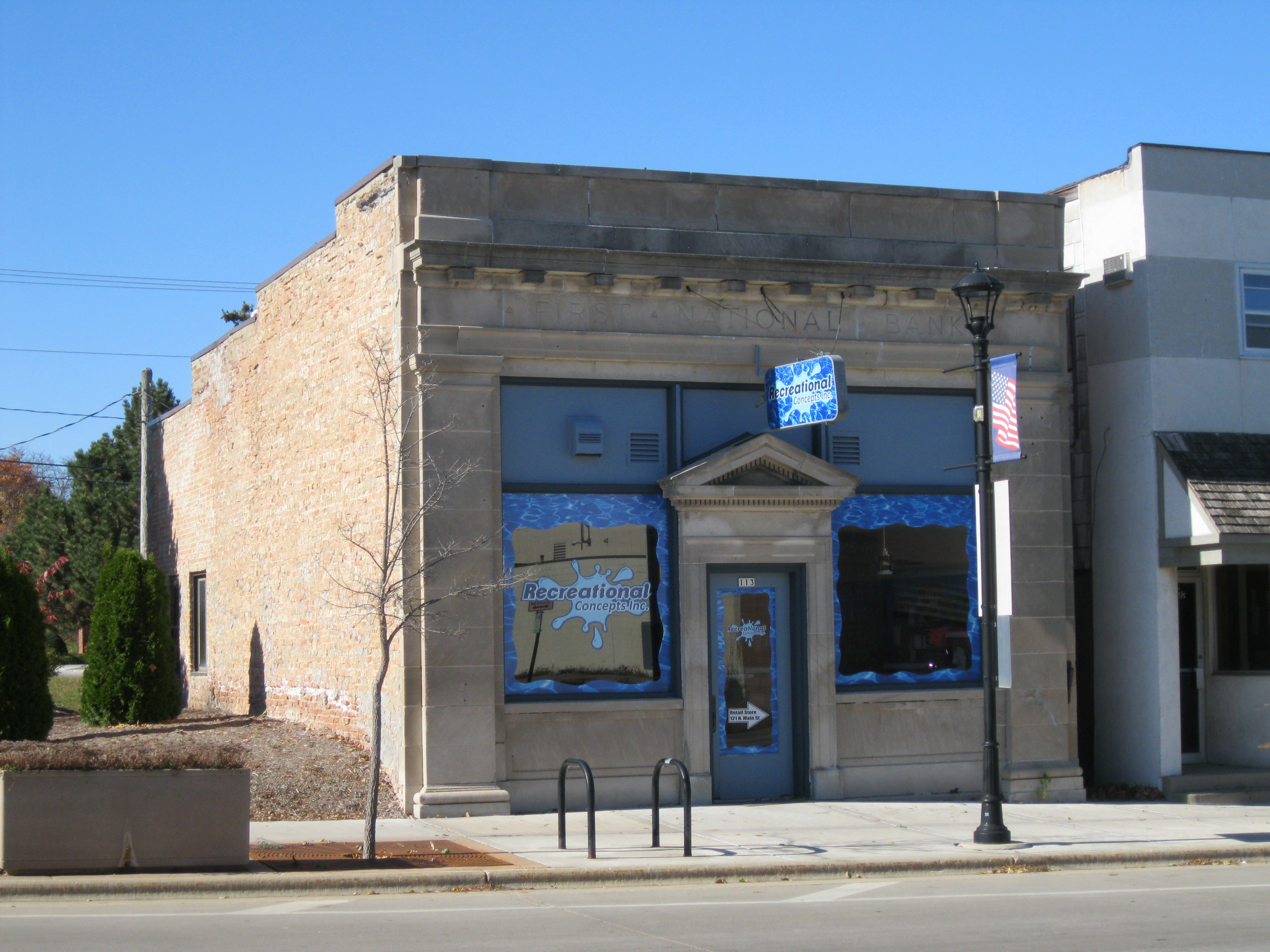
- First National Bank

- Location within Wisconsin Location within the United States
- Location: 113 N. Main St., Oregon, Wisconsin
- Coordinates: 42°55′36″N 89°23′04″W
- Area: less than one acre
- Built: 1914
- Architectural style: Classical Revival
- NRHP reference No.: 07001096
- Added to NRHP: October 16, 2007

The First National Bank in Oregon, Wisconsin is a small Neoclassical-styled bank built in 1914.

== History ==
The First National Bank operated until 1929, closing as a result of the Great Depression. Since then, it has housed a number of other commercial businesses. It was added to the State and the National Register of Historic Places in 2007.
