= Gaute Ingebretson Loft House =

Historic house in Wisconsin, United States

- Ingebretson, Gaute, Loft House
- U.S. National Register of Historic Places
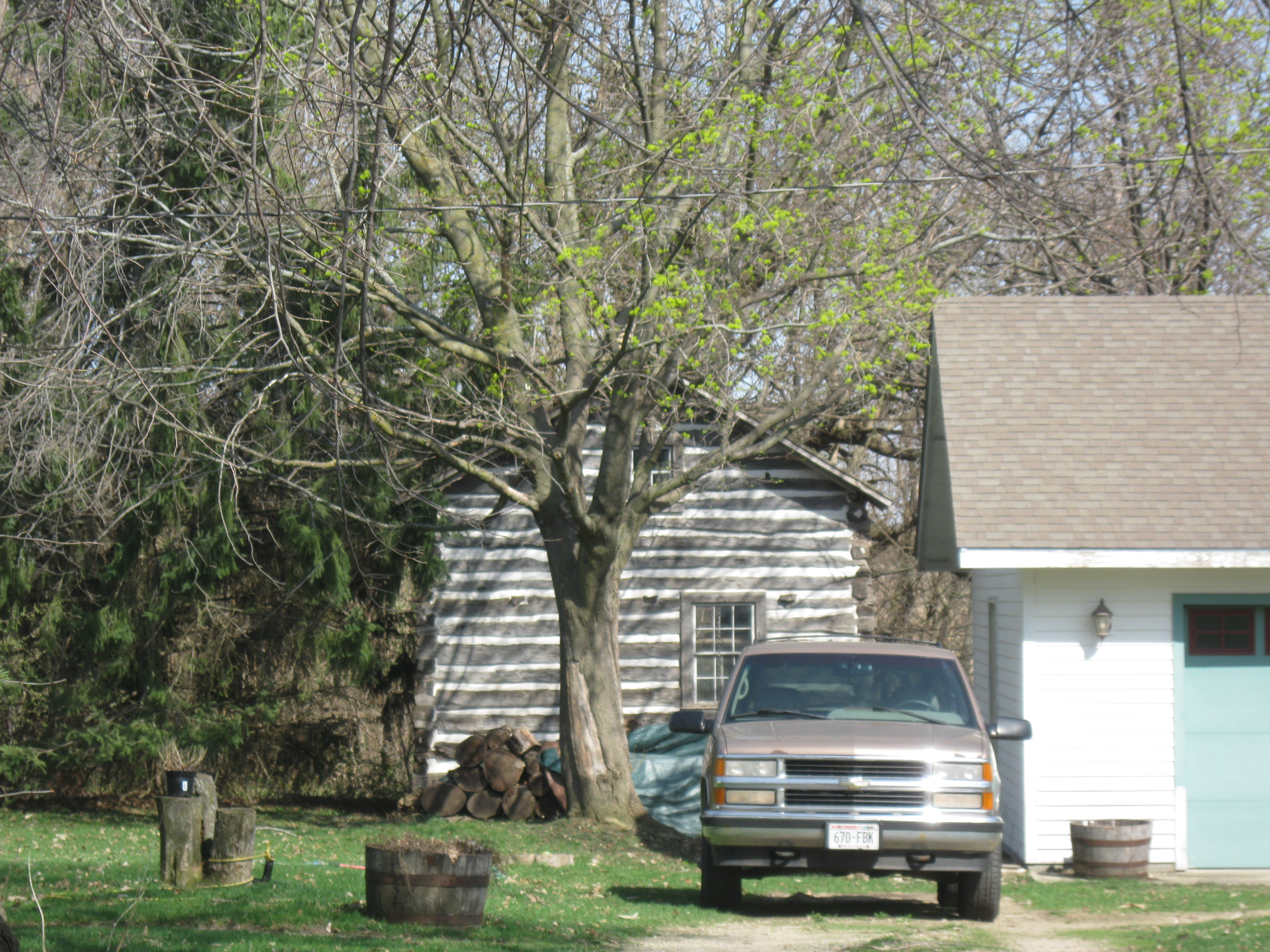
- Gaute Ingebretson Loft House
- Location: 1212 Pleasant Hill Rd. Dunkirk, Wisconsin
- Coordinates: 42°54′47″N 89°10′12″W
- Area: less than one acre
- Built: 1844
- Architect: Gaute Ingebretson
- NRHP reference No.: 87000437
- Added to NRHP: March 13, 1987

The Gaute Ingebretson Loft House is a log house in a traditional Norwegian folk style built in Dunkirk, Wisconsin around 1844. It was listed on the National Register of Historic Places in 1987 and on the State Register of Historic Places in 1989.

Gaute Ingebretson immigrated from Tinn Municipality, Norway in the spring of 1843. Arriving in Wisconsin, he initially went to Muskego where other immigrants from Tinn had settled, but he felt that the land was too poor and marshy, so he moved on to the Koshkonong area. In August, near where his loft house stands today, he found three other immigrants from Tinn who had recently settled. He joined them, buying 160 acres for $200.

Around 1844 he built his loft house. It is one story with an attic, with walls of horizontal rough-hewn red oak timbers, with the corners joined by dovetails and the gaps between logs filled with chinking strips and mortar. On the east end the second story overhangs five and a half feet beyond the first story, supported by posts. The building follows a traditional Norwegian folk form that probably dates from the late 1500s. The only other similar loft structure in the state is the Lisbakken Stabbar at Old World Wisconsin.
