= Siggelkow Park Mound Group =

- Siggelkow Park Mound Group (47-Da-504)
- U.S. National Register of Historic Places
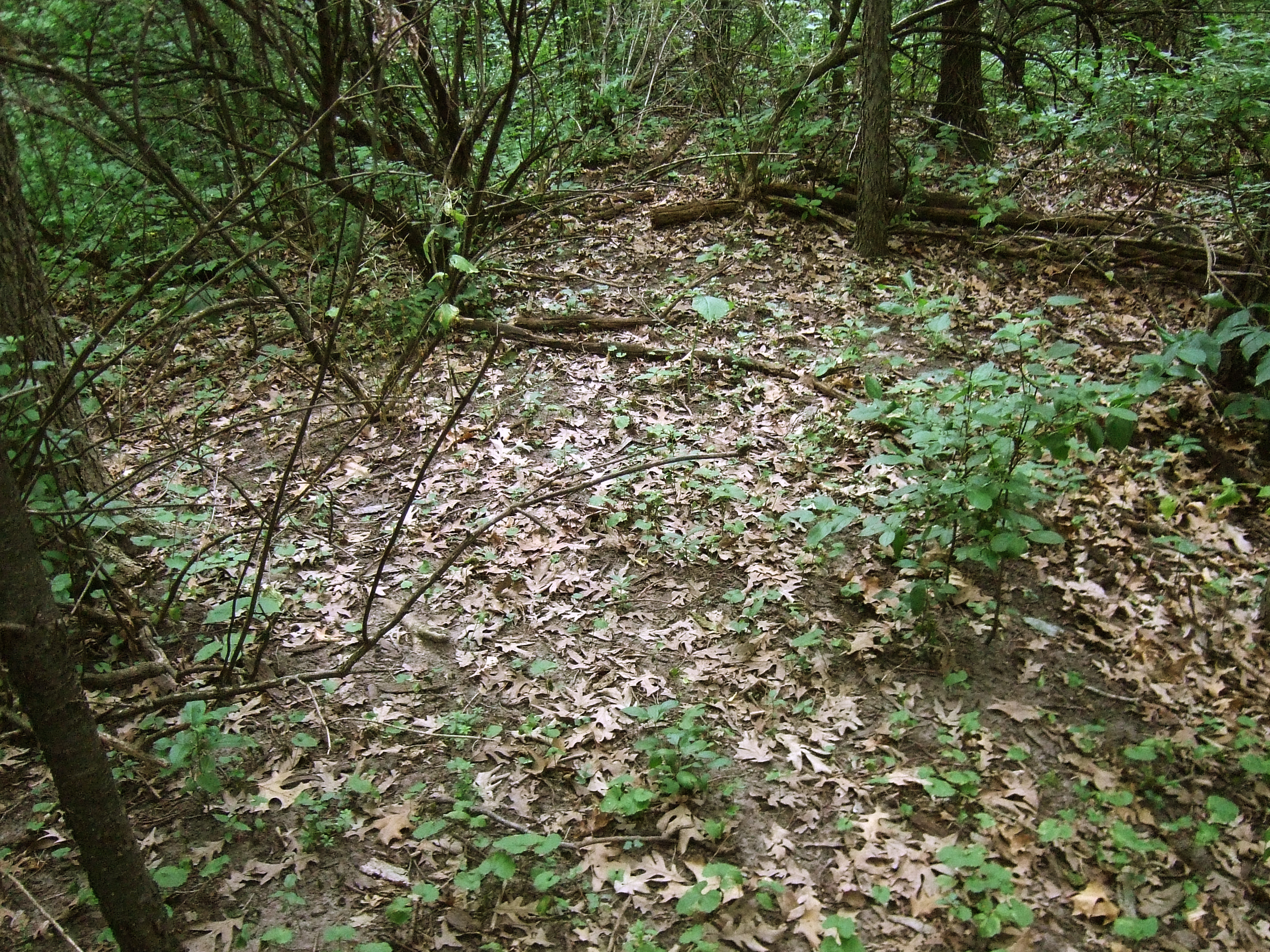
- Nearest city: McFarland, Wisconsin
- Area: 3 acres (1.2 ha)
- NRHP reference No.: 85000576
- Added to NRHP: March 14, 1985

The Siggelkow Park Mound Group is a group of Native American mounds in Siggelkow Park in McFarland, Wisconsin. The site includes one 225-foot (69 m) linear mound and the remnants of two other mounds. One of the remnants is on a neighboring residential property; while 57 feet (17 m) of the mound are still intact, the rest was destroyed by the residential development. The mounds were built during the Late Woodland period, roughly between 850 and 1200 A.D. Unlike many of the mounds in the Madison area, which were discovered during 19th century settlement by Europeans, the Siggelkow Park group was not studied until much later.

The site was added to the National Register of Historic Places on March 14, 1985.
