= Heim Mound =

- U.S. National Register of Historic Places
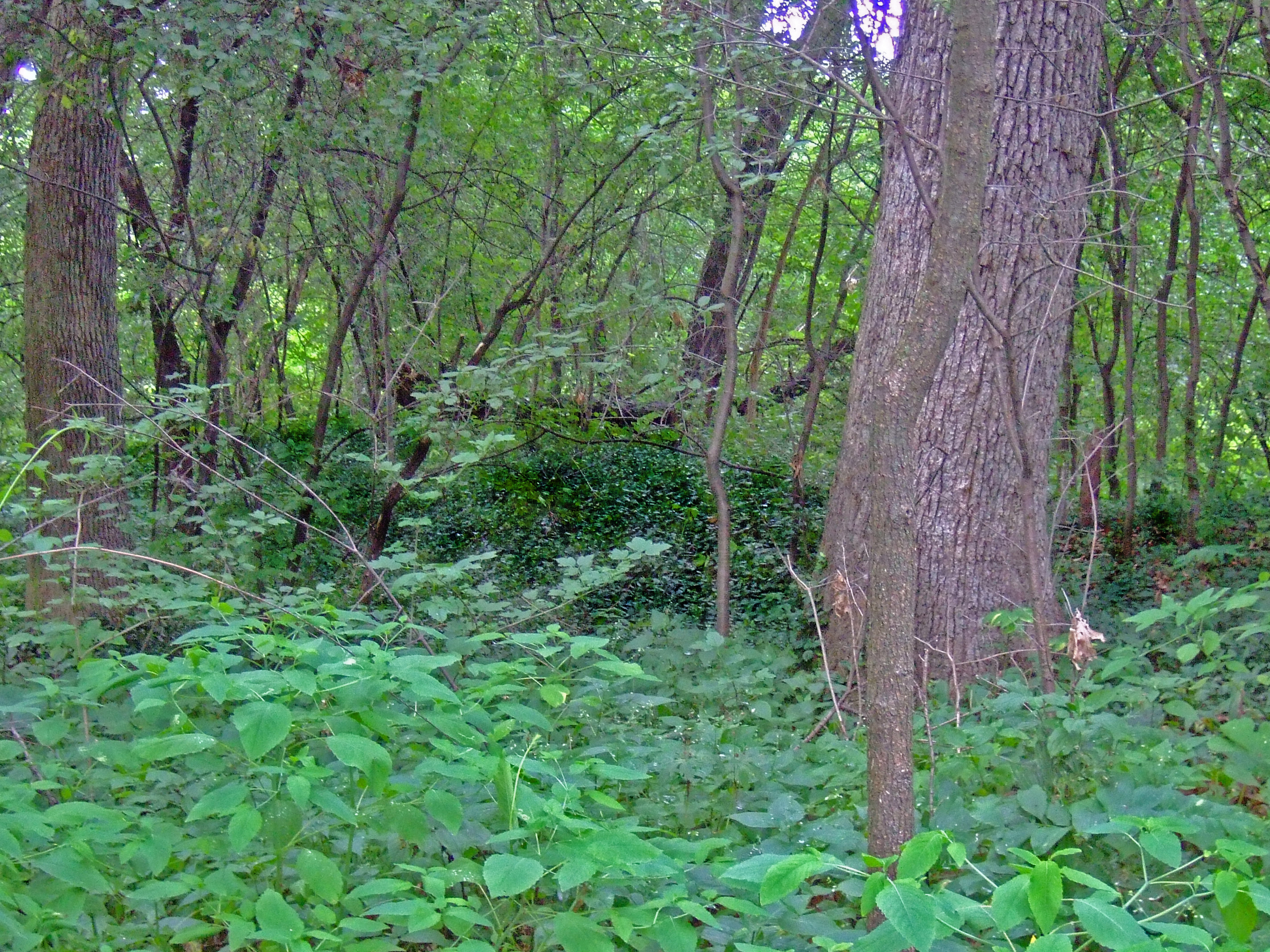

- Location within Wisconsin
- Location: Middleton, Wisconsin
- Coordinates: 43°05′38″N 89°29′21″W
- Area: less than one acre
- NRHP reference No.: 04000254
- Added to NRHP: March 31, 2004

Heim Mound is a Native American effigy mound in Middleton, Wisconsin. The mound is in the shape of a fox or wolf. Like most mounds in southern Wisconsin, it was built during the Late Woodland period, between roughly 750 and 1000 A.D. Archaeologist Charles E. Brown discovered and mapped the mound in 1915. After corresponding with landowner Ferdinand J. Heim, he convinced Heim to donate the land containing the mound to the Wisconsin Archaeological Society in 1937. The Wisconsin Archaeological Society restored the mound in 2015 to mark the 100th anniversary of its discovery.

The mound was added to the National Register of Historic Places on March 31, 2004.
