= Lewis Mound Group =

- U.S. National Register of Historic Places
- Location: Indian Mound Park, McFarland, Wisconsin
- Coordinates: 43°0′30″N 89°18′0″W
- NRHP reference No.: 84000809
- Added to NRHP: December 15, 1984

The Lewis Mound Group (47-Da-74) is a set of prehistoric Native American burial mounds in the village of McFarland, Dane County, Wisconsin, southeast of Madison. Created by late Woodland people overlooking the eastern shore of Lake Waubesa, they include a bear effigy, a hook-shaped mound, and some geometric shapes. They are visible from public trails in Indian Mound Park, which is owned by the village, just west of Indian Mound Middle School. The site was listed on the National Register of Historic Places in 1984.
