= Southwest Side Historic District =

Historic district in Wisconsin, United States

- U.S. National Register of Historic Places
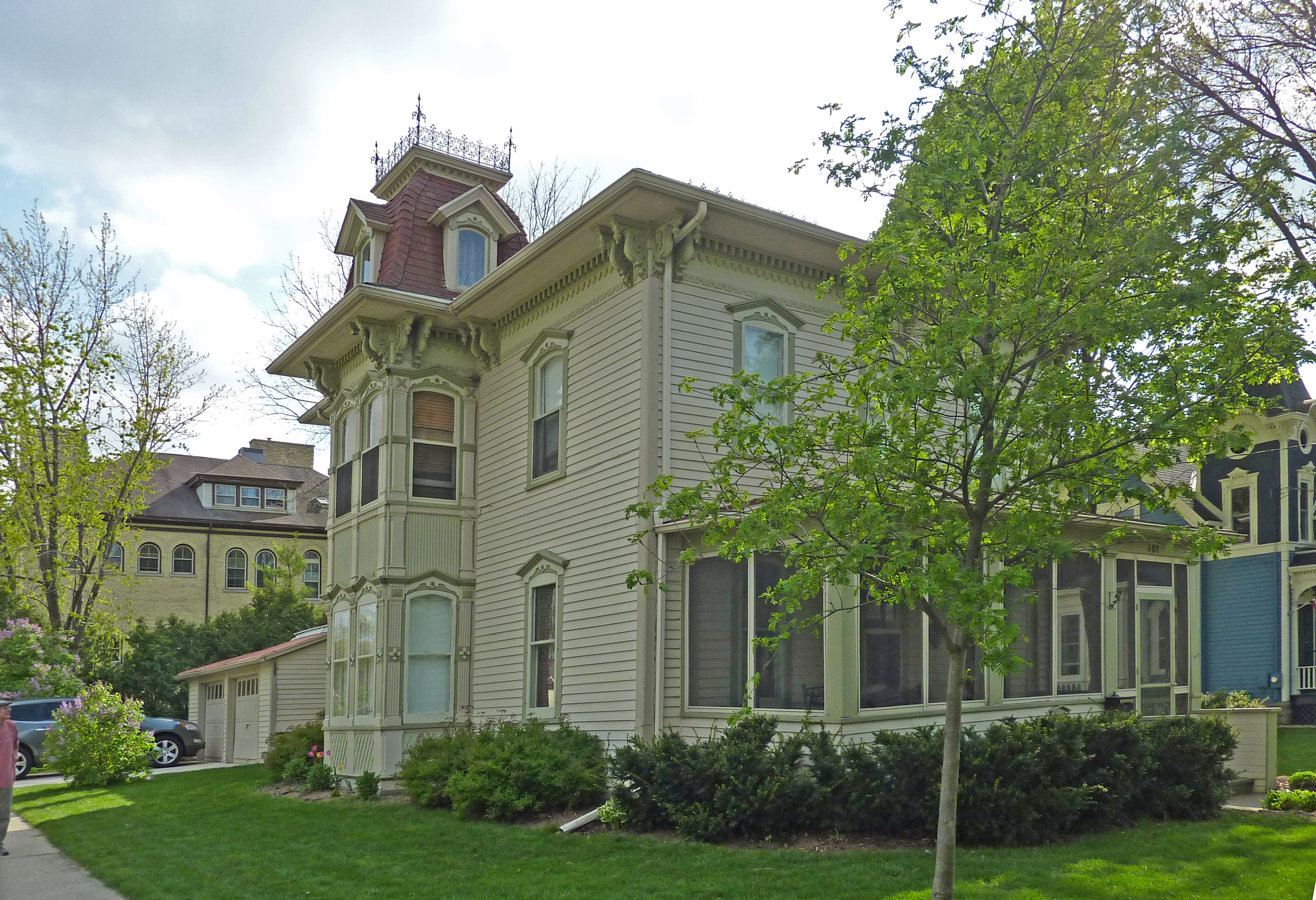
- The Ovren House, located in the district.

- Location within Wisconsin Location within the United States
- Location: Roughly bounded by Lowell, S. Monroe, W. Main and S. Page Sts., Stoughton, Wisconsin
- Coordinates: 42°55′1.02″N 89°13′4.40″W
- Area: 25 acres (10 ha)
- NRHP reference No.: 97001554
- Added to NRHP: December 22, 1997

The Southwest Side Historic District is a neighborhood in Stoughton, Wisconsin with over 100 contributing properties in various styles built as early as 1856. It was added to the State and the National Register of Historic Places in 1997.

Here are some good examples of different styles, in the order built:

- The Stoughton-Falk house at 516 S. Page St. is an Italianate-styled cream brick mansion. Luke Stoughton, the city's founder, built the main block of the house in 1856, two stories tall with a hip roof and wide eaves supported by brackets. Stoughton originally had two wings attached to the main block. Around 1890 Ole Falk, the subsequent owner, removed the two wings and added the corner bay and the porches in the Queen Anne style which had become popular by that time.
- The First Universalist Church at 324 S. Page St. is a smallish Greek Revival-styled brick church designed by Steven V. Shipman and built in 1858. The congregation had a female minister in charge in 1869, which was very progressive. The building now houses the Stoughton Historical Museum.
- The A. Ovren house at 401 W. South St (pictured) was built in 1884, a late Italianate-styled house with a 2.5-story square tower with a mansard roof topped with metal cresting.
- The West Elementary School at 400 Garfield St. is a 2-story, hip-roofed school built in 1886 and added to in 1899 and 1905. The styling is debatable, but the rough stone low on the building and the round tops on half of the windows are Richardsonian Romanesque features.
- The George Ainsworth house at 409 W. South St. is a 2-story wooden home built in 1886 with a tower with oculus windows and mansard roof. Its massing is Queen Anne style, with its irregular plan and corner tower, but other stylings are in the direction of Carpenter Gothic: the emphasis on vertical, the scrollwork and stickwork in the gable peaks, and the window hoods.
- The Evans house at 511 S. Page St. is another Queen Anne, 2.5 stories and built in 1889. This one has interesting corner bays and a Palladian window over the front porch. Unlike the Ainsworth house above, this design displays the usual Queen Anne concern with breaking up the wall surfaces with different textures: shingles in the gable ends, and bands of different colors as your eye moves up the wall.
- The Homstad-Olson house at 417 W. South St. is another Queen Anne home built 1889 by John J. Holmstad, who built at least eight Queen Anne homes in the district. Like the Evans house above, it has corner bays and shingles in the gable ends. It also has bands of shingles halfway up the bays, and like the Ainsworth house above, elaborate stickwork in some of the gable peaks and the corner porch. The district has more Queen Anne houses than any other style.
- The Mina Martin house at 501 W. South St. was built around 1900. It is rather simply decorated, classed as gabled-ell because the floor plan is in the shape of the letter L.
- The Trulson house at 524 S. Page St. was built in 1903. It has American Foursquare-style massing, with its general cube shape and hip roof, and its styling is Colonial Revival, seen in the symmetry, the front porch with Doric columns and low balustrade, and the Palladian window on the side. Dr. Trulson was the city health officer.
- The Methodist Episcopal church at 401 W. Main St. was built in 1904 - Gothic Revival-styled with a massive corner tower and large windows containing Gothic arches and stained glass. True to its style, the tower and various openings direct the viewer's attention to heaven.
- The Bailey house at 308 S. Monroe St. was built in 1910, a Dutch Colonial Revival-styled house with the gambrel roof that is signature to the style.
- The Schrode house at 408 S. Page St. is a brick Craftsman-styled house built in 1923. Characteristic of the style are the broad eaves and hipped roof. Mr. Schrode was a tobacco dealer.
