= Friederich Kohlmann House =

Historic house in Wisconsin, United States

- U.S. National Register of Historic Places
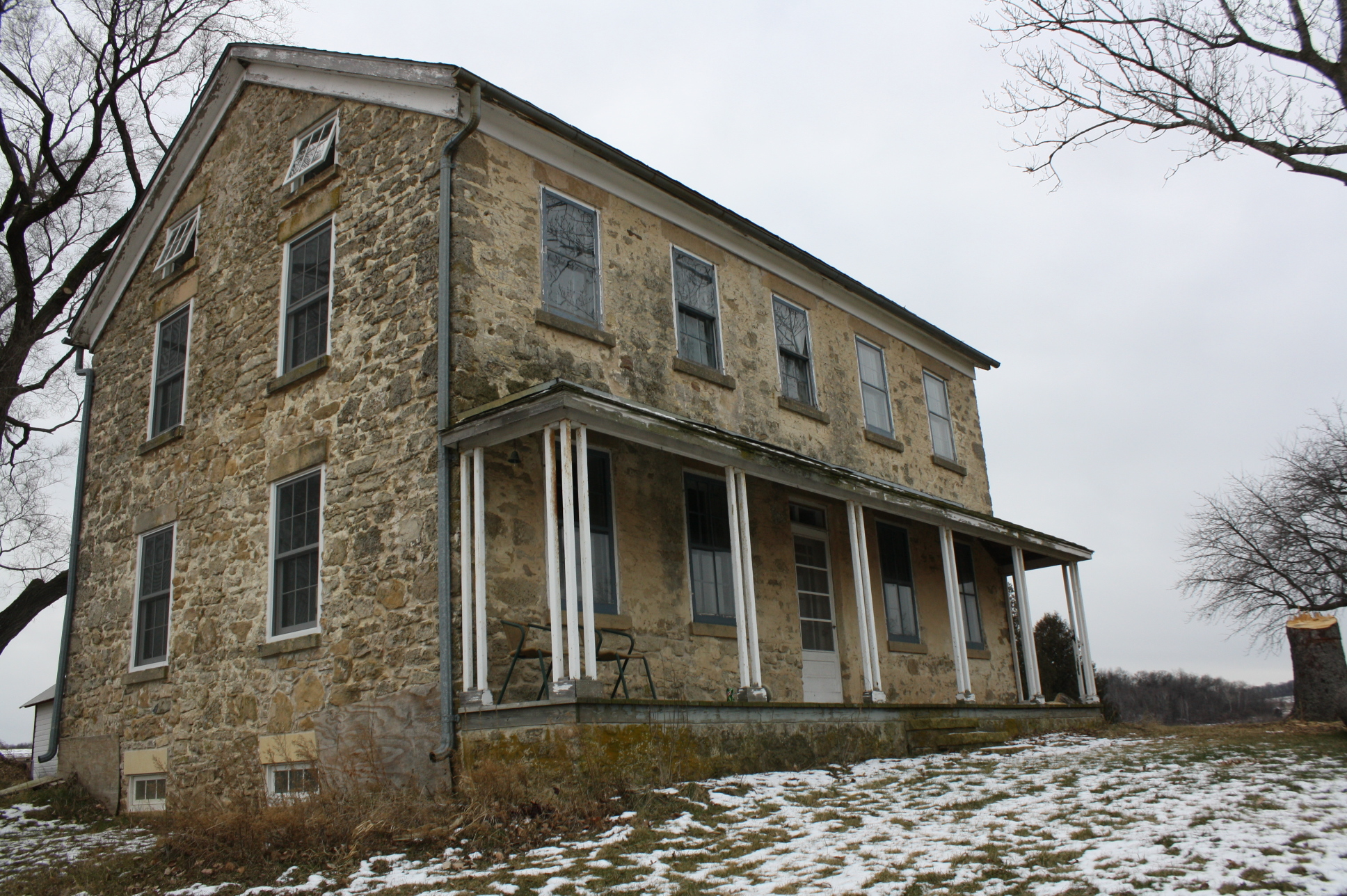
- Friederich Kohlmann House
- Location: WI 19; Berry, Wisconsin
- Coordinates: 43°11′10″N 89°38′22″W
- Area: less than one acre
- Built: 1867
- NRHP reference No.: 74000075
- Added to NRHP: December 27, 1974

The Friderich Kohlmann House is a stone farmhouse built by a German settler in 1867 in Berry, Wisconsin. It was listed on the National Register of Historic Places in 1974 and on the State Register of Historic Places in 1989.

Friederich Kohlmann immigrated from Germany to Wisconsin with his parents in 1847. His father was murdered shortly after their arrival. In 1850, Friederich married Elizabeth Setimann. Later he served in the Civil War. Before building this stone house they lived in a log cabin on the west end of Indian Lake.

In 1867 they had the surviving house built, with stone carried in by Indians. It stands 2.5 stories tall, with walls of uncoursed fieldstone which Kohlmann original plastered over with a stucco-like finish. The windows have cut stone sills and lintels. The windows were originally flanked by wooden shutters and a narrow porch ran the length of the house, perhaps similar to the one recently added.

Friederich helped found St. John's Evangelical Church in Roxbury. His descendants owned the house until 1974.

The house is significant as a good example of the masonry built by German immigrants in the 1860s.
