= Frederick Schumann Farmstead =

- U.S. National Register of Historic Places
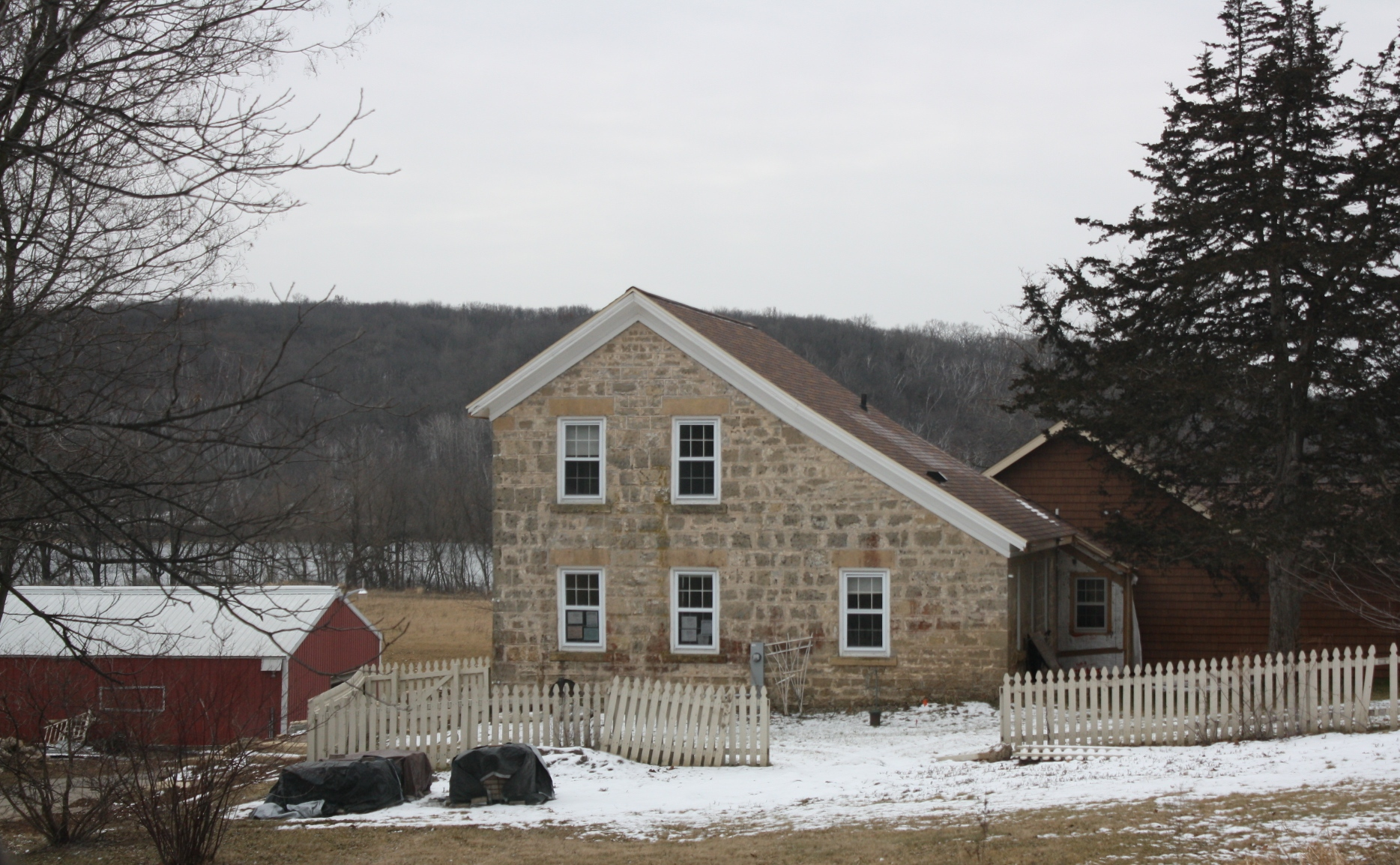
- Frederick Schumann Farmstead
- Location: 8313 WI 19, Berry, Wisconsin
- Coordinates: 43°11′40″N 89°37′49″W
- Area: 2 acres (0.81 ha)
- Built: 1878
- Architect: Frederick Schumann
- Architectural style: Mid 19th Century Revival
- NRHP reference No.: 93001426
- Added to NRHP: December 10, 1993

The Frederick Schumann Farmstead is a well-preserved saltbox-shaped stone farmhouse built by a German immigrant family in 1878 in Berry, Wisconsin. In 1993 it was listed on the National Register of Historic Places.

== History ==
Frederick Schumann was born in Saxony, Germany in 1832. When he was 18, his parents Christian and Susanna Schlag Schumann sold their farm in Schoenburg and sailed to America with their eight children. They stayed a bit with Susanna's relatives at Springfield Corners, then bought 80 acres in a picturesque valley that fronted on the road from Madison to Sauk City, with Indian Lake behind. When the Schumanns arrived in 1850, there were only 24 voters in the township, and part of the Schumanns' new farm was stumps left from logging.

In 1854 son Frederick bought 80 acres to the east of his parents' farm, the land which this article describes. He married Susanna Zimmerman the following year. They had children. After serving in the Civil War, Schumann continued farming, and had expanded his farm to 140 acres by 1873. Frederick must have been well-respected because his neighbors elected him president of the newly formed Berry Mutual Fire Insurance Company in 1876, and a member of the board of directors.

By 1877 Frederick and Susanna had eleven children, and they decided to build a new house to replace the one they had been living in. Frederick was "gifted in woodworking and carpentry" and is said to have built a lot of the house.

The house has a saltbox shape, meaning the front is two stories tall while the rear roof reaches down to a one-story wall - a form more common in early New England than Wisconsin. The walls are of limestone rubble 18 inches thick, with mortar tooled over the surface to suggest coursed blocks. The front door has a stone sill and a lintel in which is carved "F. S. 1878" in characters that look from that period. The top of the wall is framed in a fascia board. The roof is clad in thin cedar shakes, similar to the originals.

Inside, the front door opens into a living room in which the three windows are trimmed in wood down to the floor, so that each is like a built-in bookshelf. Most floors are of unpainted pine boards. The back rooms are a dining room and kitchen. Upstairs are bedrooms. The area under the rear slope of the roof was used as an unfinished sleeping area for some of the Schumann's fifteen children.

Susanna died in 1892. In 1894 Frederick sold the farm to his son Gustave and moved to Mazomanie. In 1901 the neighbor Michael Kelter bought the farm. By 1905 a frame summer kitchen was added off the dining room, with a shed-roofed open porch next to it. Kelter operated a dairy farm, with a rough circle of farm buildings to the south of the house: a gas house, an animal barn, a wood silo, a granary, a machine shed, a corn crib, a hog barn, and a chicken coop.

In 1965 John Street, a linguistics professor at UW-Madison, bought the farm and began to restore the house. He replastered the inside walls and replaced the old summer kitchen with a somewhat similar one-story frame addition behind the house. Dr. Street's obituary in 2017 reveals his affection for the place:

There was one non-academic accomplishment of which Professor Street was especially proud: the restoration of an 1878 stone salt-box house in Berry Township, northwest of Madison. Thanks to sheer luck he was able to purchase the fine old house - with considerable acreage and part of a small lake - for a very reasonable price in 1965. After much physical labor, and professional replacement of wiring, plumbing, etc., he moved into the house in 1966, and lived there (with his wife, after marriage in 1975) for over 30 years. In the meantime, with the help of the Wisconsin Historic Society, he was able to get the building listed on the National Register of Historic Places; and in 1974 sold the lake property on his farm to the Dane County Parks Department for what has since then been called Indian Lake County Park.
