= Jens and Ingeborg Cold House =

Historic house in Wisconsin, United States

- U.S. National Register of Historic Places
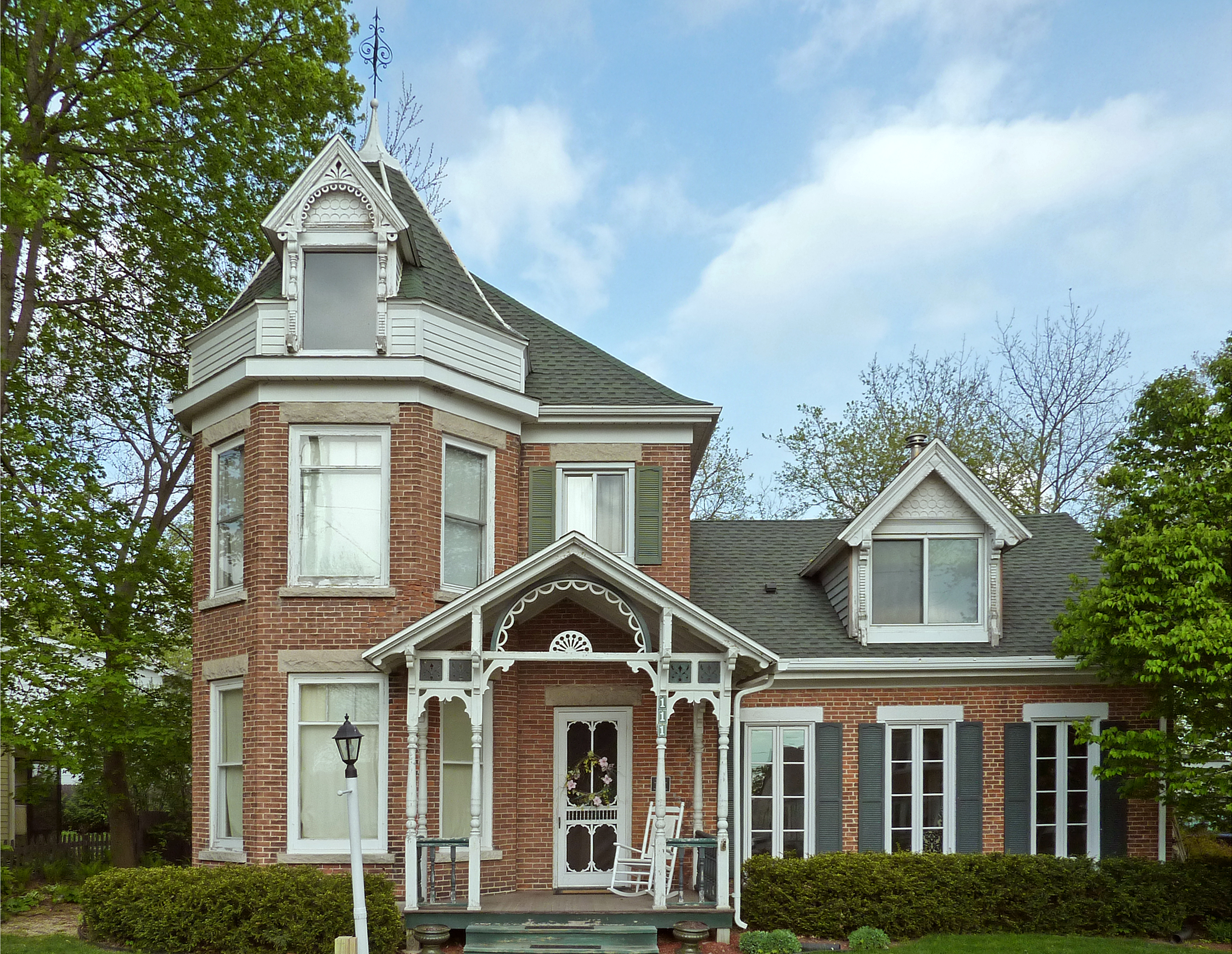
- Jens and Ingeborg Cold House
- Location: 111 S Fifth St., Stoughton, Wisconsin
- Coordinates: 42°55′05″N 89°12′58″W
- Area: less than one acre
- Built: 1858
- Architectural style: Queen Anne
- NRHP reference No.: 03000169
- Added to NRHP: March 26, 2003

The Jens and Ingeborg Cold House is a historic home begun in Stoughton, Wisconsin in 1858 and expanded/remodeled in 1892. It was added to the State and the National Register of Historic Places in 2003.

Jens Cold immigrated from Norway in 1854 and married Ingeborg in 1860. By the 1865 he was a saddler and harness maker. In 1875 he and Ingeborg bought the lot where the house stands. The house at that time was probably the 1.5-story, side-gabled portion of the house that still exists, with walls of load-bearing brick. It may have been built in 1858, when a jump in the property tax valuation indicates that something was built there.

In 1898 the Colds remodeled and added on to the house. Queen Anne style had become popular by that time, and they headed in that direction. On the existing 1.5-story section of the house, they extended the windows down to the floor to make them French doors and they added the front-facing dormer, with bargeboards and patterned shingles decorating the top of the gable. But the real Queen Anne style is in the 2-story addition, apparent in the corner tower, the asymmetry, the bay window, and the hip roof of the block behind. The addition is clad in the same red brick as the 1.5-story section, unifying the whole design. The front door is shaded by a porch supported by turned posts topped with a sunburst pattern.
