= Dunroven House =

- U.S. National Register of Historic Places
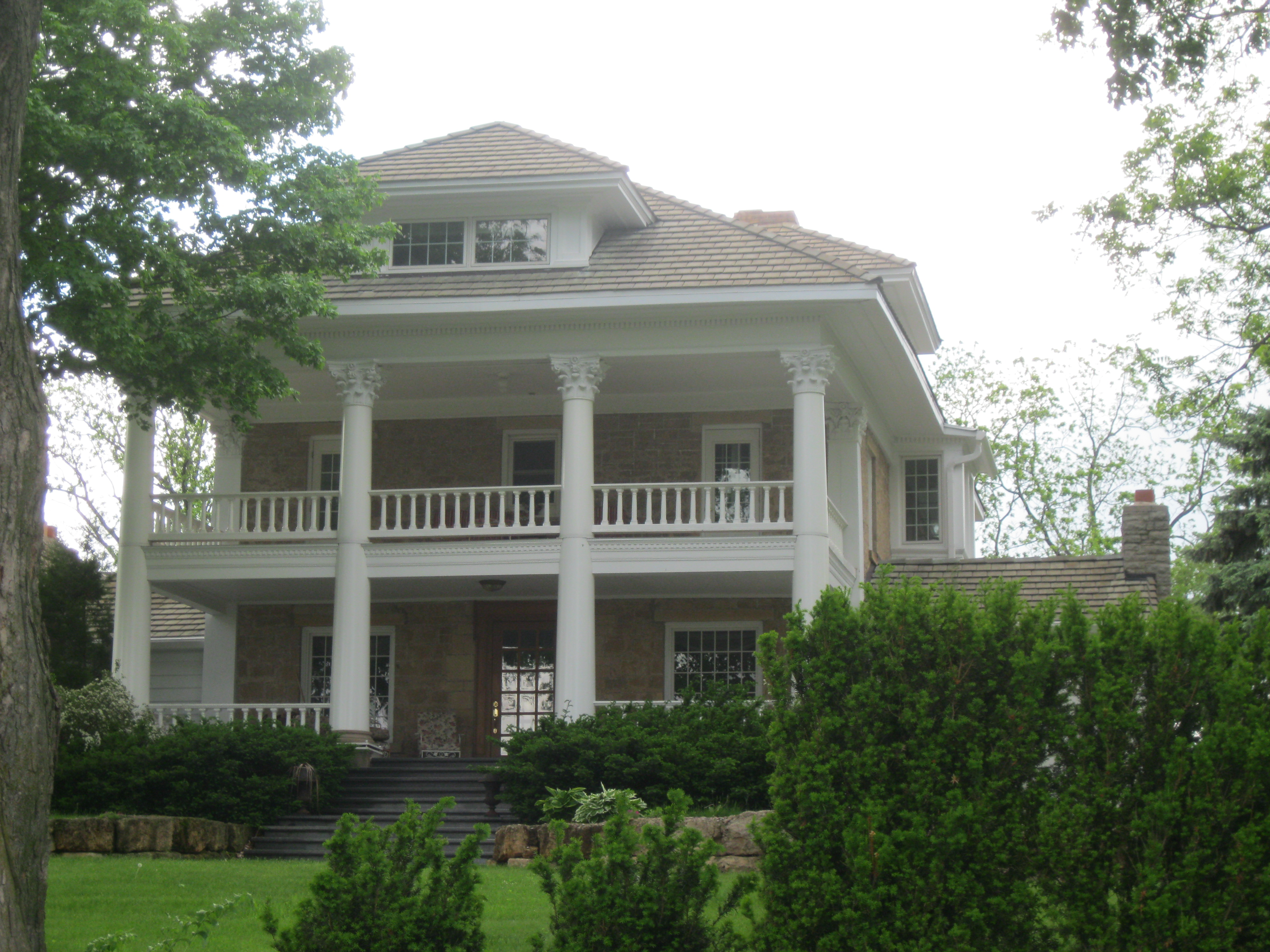

- Location within Wisconsin
- Location: 7801 Dunroven Rd., Dane, Wisconsin
- Coordinates: 43°17′04″N 89°28′23″W
- Area: 1.6 acres (0.65 ha)
- Built: 1870
- Architectural style: Colonial Revival
- NRHP reference No.: 80000120
- Added to NRHP: November 28, 1980

The Dunroven House is a historic house at 7801 Dunroven Road northeast of the village of Dane, Wisconsin. The house was built in 1870 by Abram Asa Boyce, a farmer and politician who served in the Wisconsin State Legislature and chaired the Dane County Board of Supervisors. Boyce's original house, which he named Walnut Hill, was a two-story sandstone building. E. W. de Bower purchased the house in 1909 and expanded it into a Colonial Revival home that was much larger than others in the area. The house's design features a full portico on the front facade supported by four two-story Corinthian columns and hipped dormers projecting from the roof. de Bower, who lived in Chicago and hired locals to raise cattle on the property, named the new house Mont-Joy in honor of his wife.

The house was added to the National Register of Historic Places on November 28, 1980.
