= Francis Marian Ames Farmstead =

- U.S. National Register of Historic Places
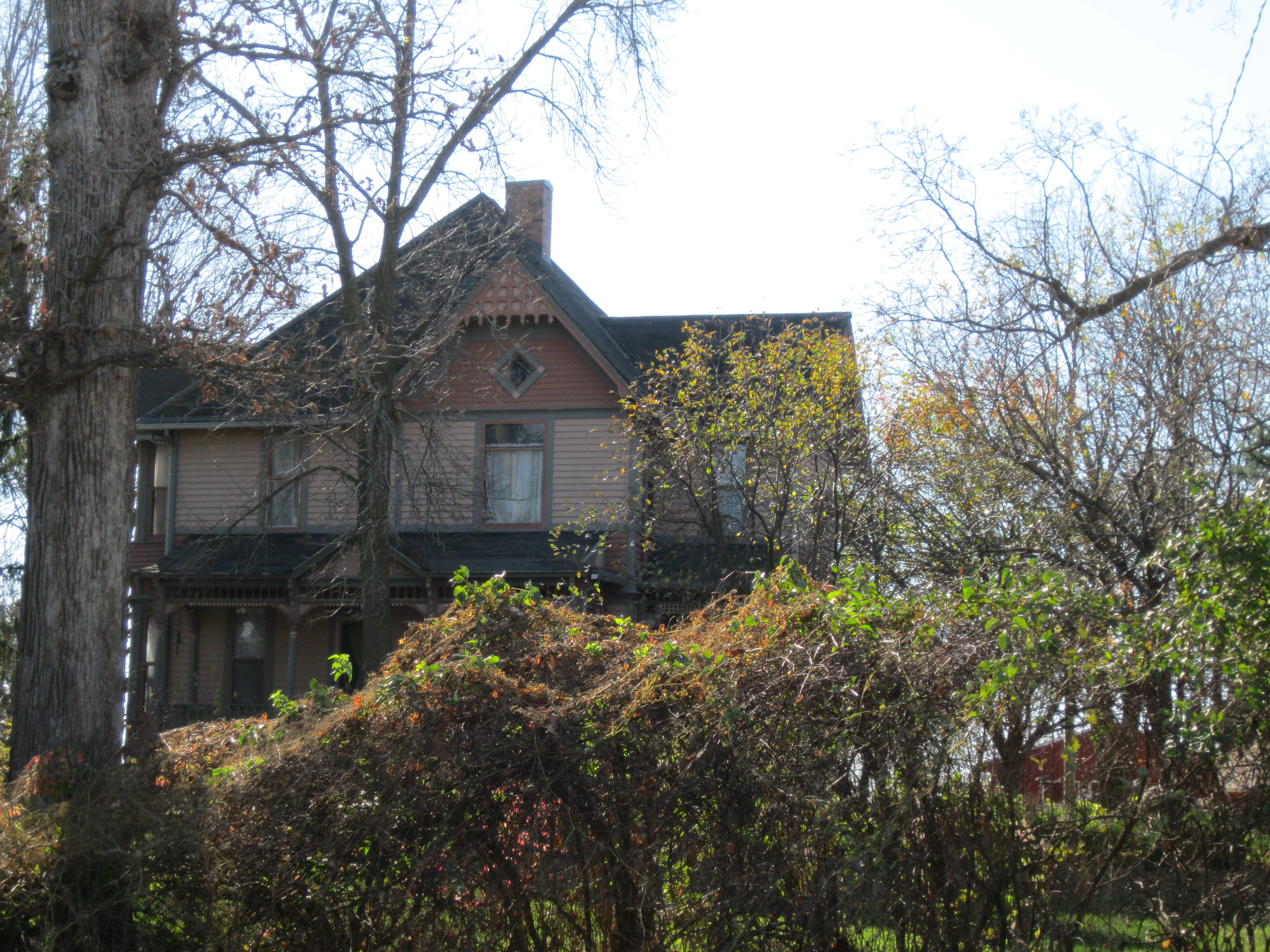
- Francis Marian Ames Farmstead
- Location: 221 US 14, Rutland, Wisconsin
- Coordinates: 42°51′26″N 89°20′40″W
- Area: 4.2 acres (1.7 ha)
- Built: 1892
- Architect: Hankinson & Blanchard
- Architectural style: Queen Anne
- NRHP reference No.: 92001555
- Added to NRHP: November 5, 1992

The Francis Marian Ames Farmstead is located in Rutland, Wisconsin. It was added to the State and the National Register of Historic Places in 1992.

In 1878 F.M. Ames bought this farmland from Samuel Axtell's estate. In 1892 he built the Queen Anne-styled house that stands today, two stories, clad mostly in clapboard. The gable ends contain diamond-shaped windows and are decorated with shingles, bargeboards and lattice-work at the peaks. The porches are decorated with spindlework. Some of the windows are leaded glass.

The farmstead also includes some outbuildings: a frame basement barn, a small animal shelter that was probably the lower level of another frame basement barn, and a garage that was probably used as horse and carriage barn.
