= Frey School =

- U.S. National Register of Historic Places
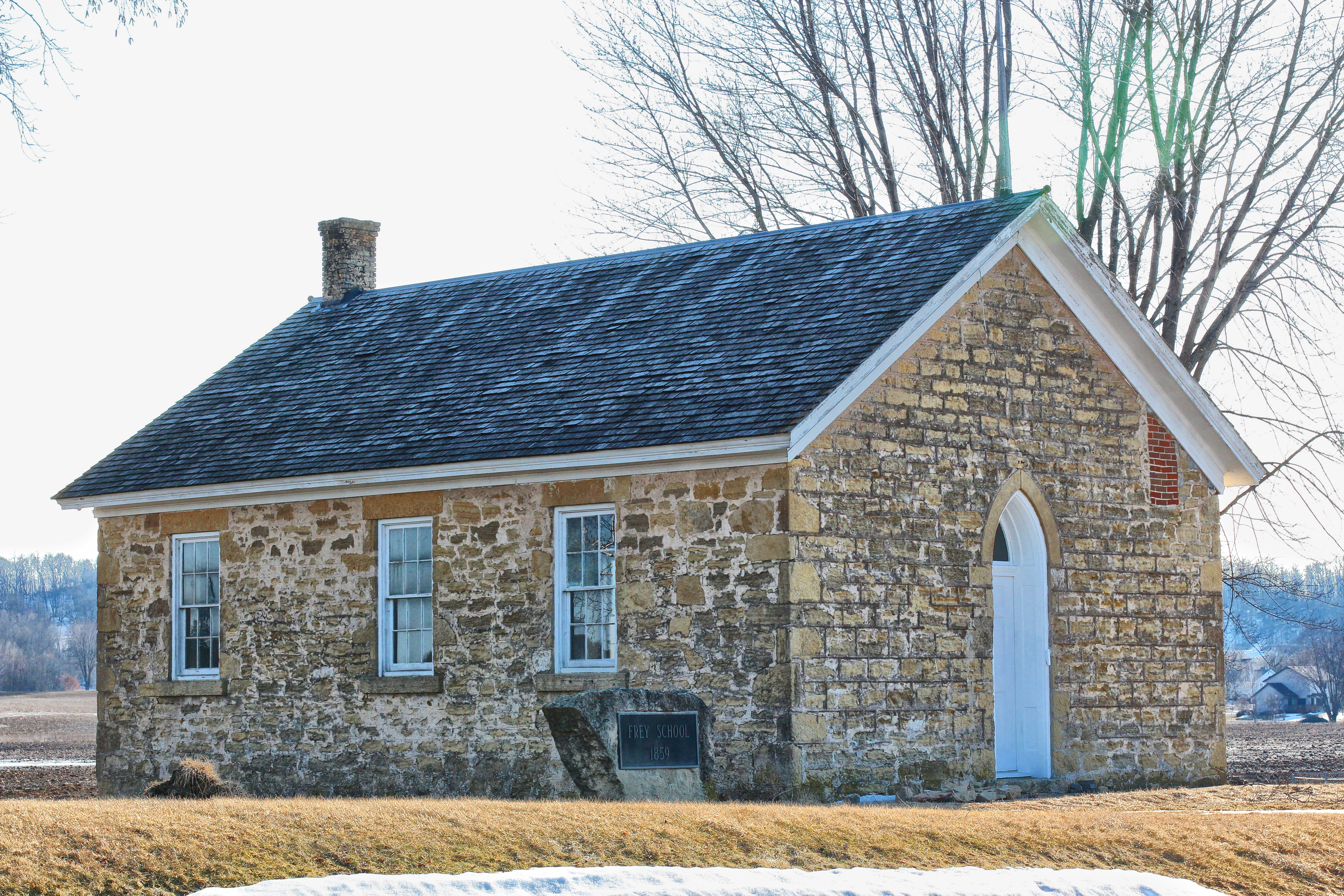
- Frey School
- Location: 8847 County Hwy Y Roxbury, Wisconsin, United States
- Coordinates: 43.24922°N 89.66988°W
- NRHP reference No.: 11000461
- Added to NRHP: July 14, 2011

The Frey School building is an early one-room school built between 1870 and 1881 in Roxbury, Wisconsin. The school was added to the State Register of Historic Places in 2010 and to the National Register of Historic Places the following year.

== History ==
An earlier one-room school was built of wood on this site between 1855 and 1861. The building was constructed on land that was donated by Bavarian immigrants Agidius and Anna Frey. For many years the Freys provided water for drinking and wood for heating the school.

By 1870 the school population had outgrown that first building, so the district replaced the old wooden school with this building. Its walls are locally-quarried sandstone, somewhat coursed. The front door with the pointed top is stylish compared to the rest of the building. Inside is a vestibule where coats were hung, then the one classroom. Interior walls and ceiling are plastered.

Three other one-room schools were built of sandstone in the township. Of them all, the Frey School is the most intact.
