= Waubesa School =

- U.S. National Register of Historic Places
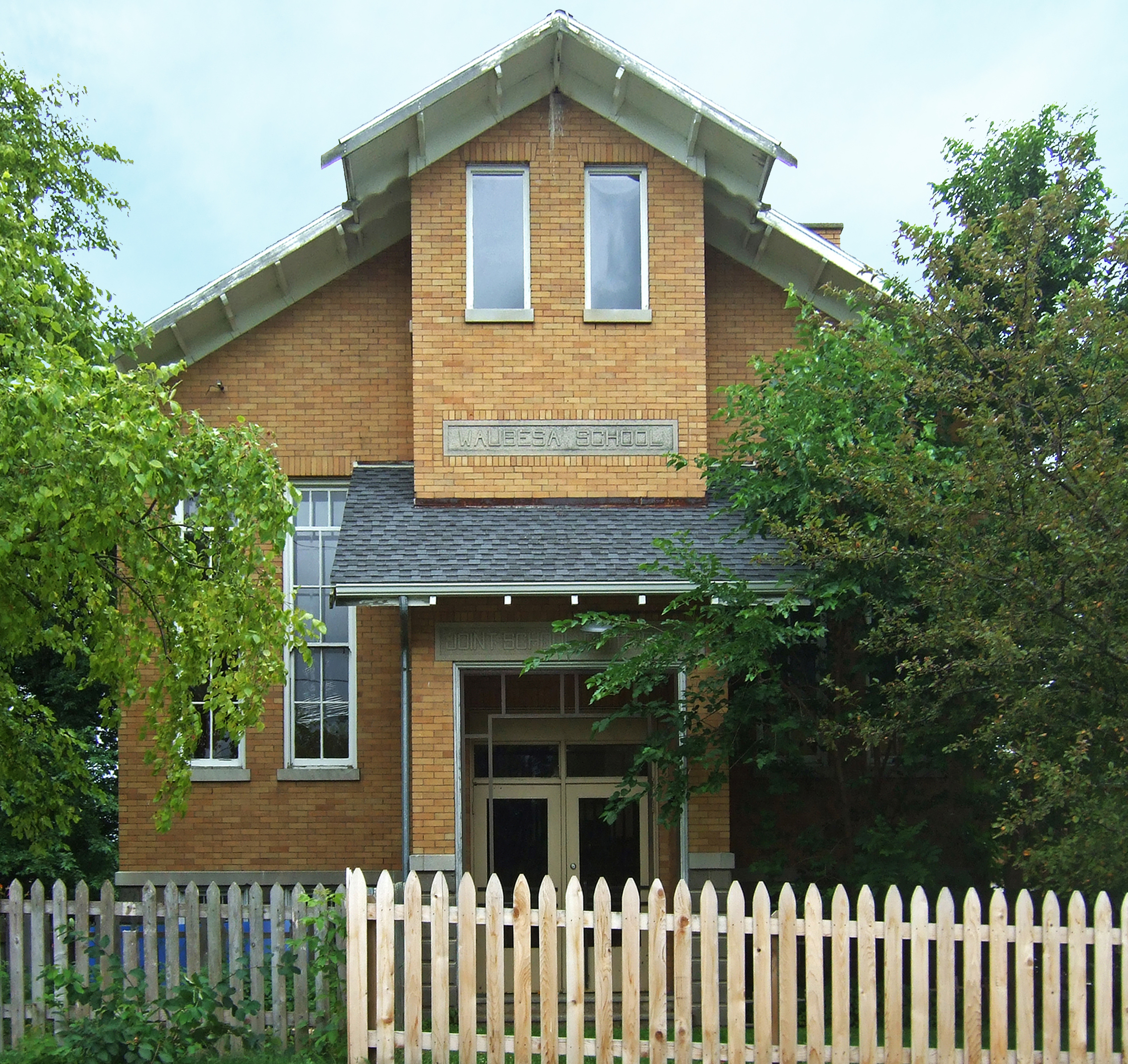

- Location within Wisconsin
- Location: 5979 Sigglekow Rd., McFarland, Wisconsin
- Coordinates: 43°01′34″N 89°16′38″W
- Area: 1.3 acres (0.53 ha)
- Built: 1920
- Built by: Louis A. Harrison
- Architectural style: American Craftsman
- NRHP reference No.: 97000806
- Added to NRHP: July 17, 1997

The Waubesa School is a historic school building at 5979 Siggelkow Road in McFarland, Wisconsin. Built in 1920 by contractor Louis A. Harrison, the school is a relatively late example of a one-room schoolhouse. The one-story brick building has an American Craftsman design with a projecting entrance topped by a bell tower, large sash windows, and a gable roof with exposed rafters. Like most one-room schoolhouses built after 1910, the Waubesa School is much larger than its nineteenth-century counterparts, and it included amenities such as electric wiring, a furnace, and a small library; its plans also included indoor plumbing, but this was rejected by voters due to its cost. Many of these features were likely a response to Wisconsin's state graded school initiative; though one-room schools were ineligible to be state-graded, the school met many of the other certification requirements. The school operated until 1954, when the school board voted to consolidate with the McFarland School District; McFarland used the building as a kindergarten until 1961 and sold it to private owners the following year.

The building was added to the National Register of Historic Places on July 17, 1997.
