= Mazomanie Town Hall =

- U.S. National Register of Historic Places
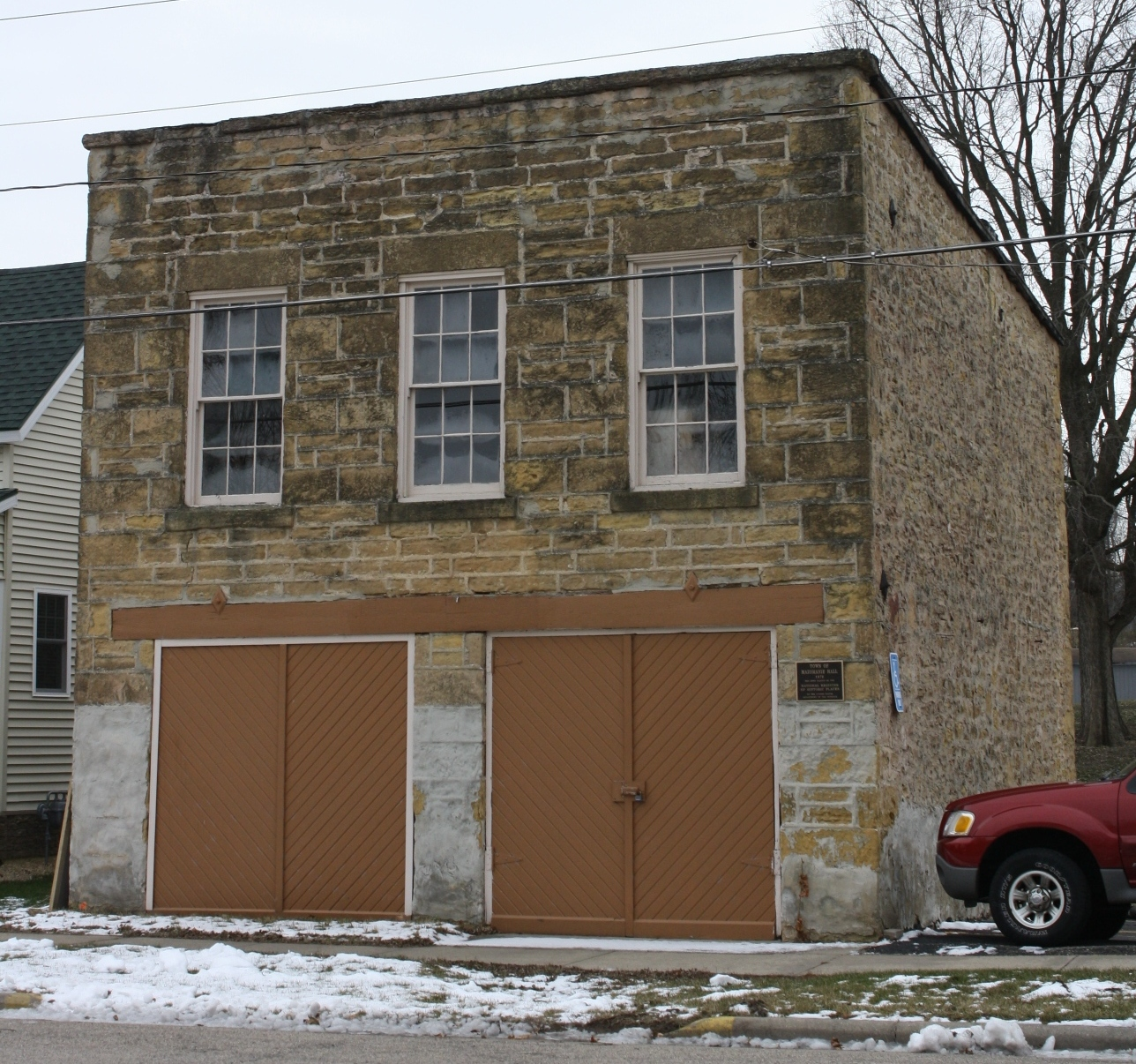

- Location within Wisconsin
- Location: 51 Crescent St., Mazomanie, Wisconsin
- Coordinates: 43°10′34″N 89°47′33″W
- Area: 0.3 acres (0.12 ha)
- Built: 1878
- NRHP reference No.: 80000126
- Added to NRHP: October 22, 1980

The Mazomanie Town Hall is a historic building at 51 Crescent Street in the village of Mazomanie, Wisconsin. The two-story stone building was built in 1878 to serve as the Town of Mazomanie's fire department. The Mazomanie town clerk moved to the building in 1879, and after the fire department relocated in 1897 the town government continued to use the building. The town used the building until the 1960s. The building also hosted town meetings and social events, including fire department fundraisers while it served as a firehouse. The Mazomanie Historical Society acquired the building in 1979.

The building was added to the National Register of Historic Places on October 22, 1980.
