= Maple Bluff Boy Scout Cabin =

- U.S. National Register of Historic Places
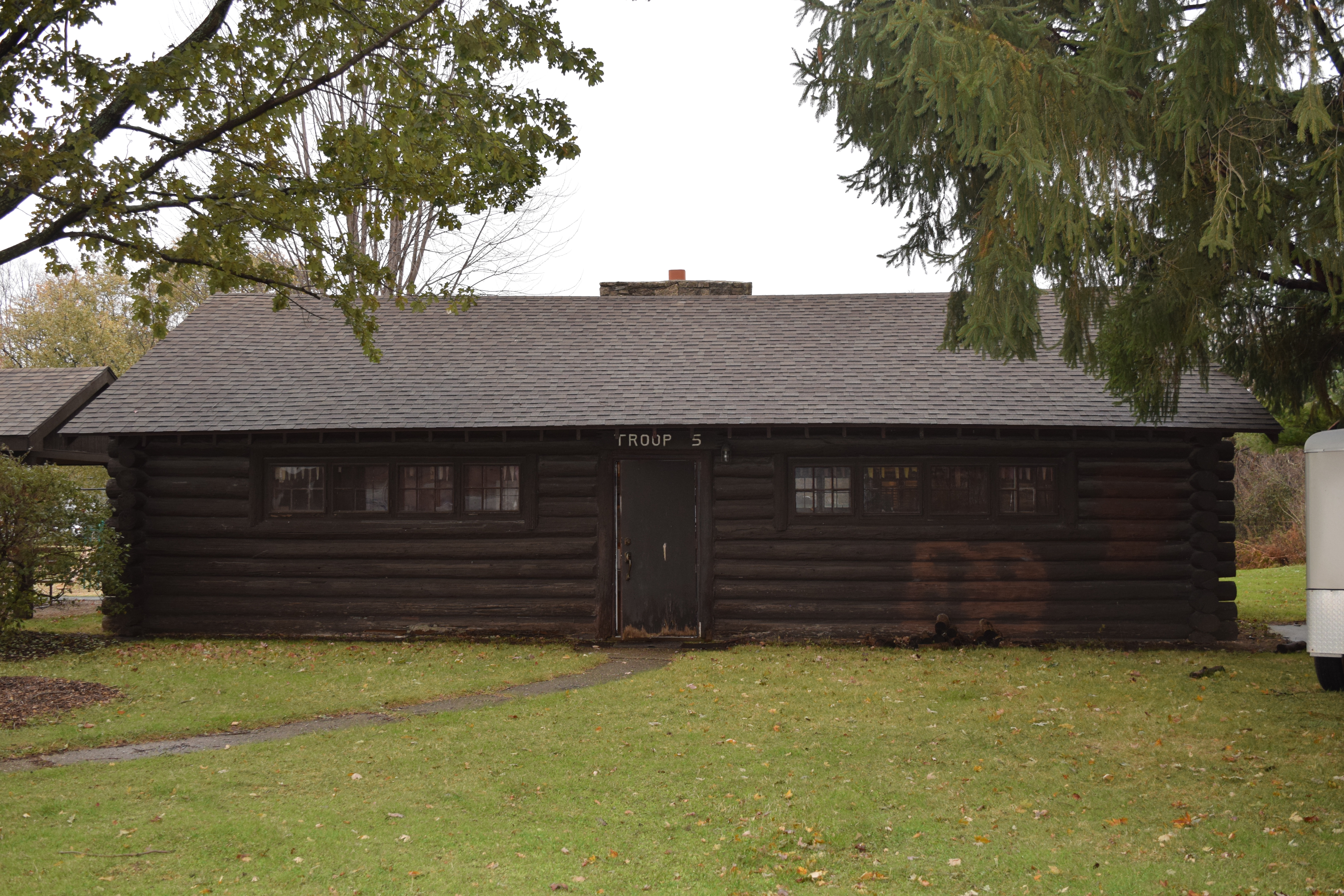

- Location within Wisconsin
- Location: 296 Woodland Cir., Maple Bluff, Wisconsin
- Coordinates: 43°06′39″N 89°21′54″W
- Built: 1943
- Architectural style: Rustic
- NRHP reference No.: 100001783
- Added to NRHP: November 6, 2017

The Maple Bluff Boy Scout Cabin is a log cabin in Fireman's Park in Maple Bluff, Wisconsin. Maple Bluff's Troop 5 of the Boy Scouts of America built the cabin in 1943. At the time, Boy Scout troops often built their own cabins and were encouraged to do so by the BSA, which included instructions on building a cabin in the Boy Scout Handbook, offered a merit badge for building a cabin, and featured completed cabins in its magazine Boys' Life. The cabin cost an estimated $780.24, with labor provided by the Boy Scouts and their fathers; the village of Maple Bluff leased the land to the troop for ten years for a nominal $1 fee, which was extended to twenty years once the building was complete. The cabin has been used by Troop 5 for meetings and activities since its completion.

The building was listed on the National Register of Historic Places on November 6, 2017.
