= Nicholas Haight Farmstead =

- U.S. National Register of Historic Places
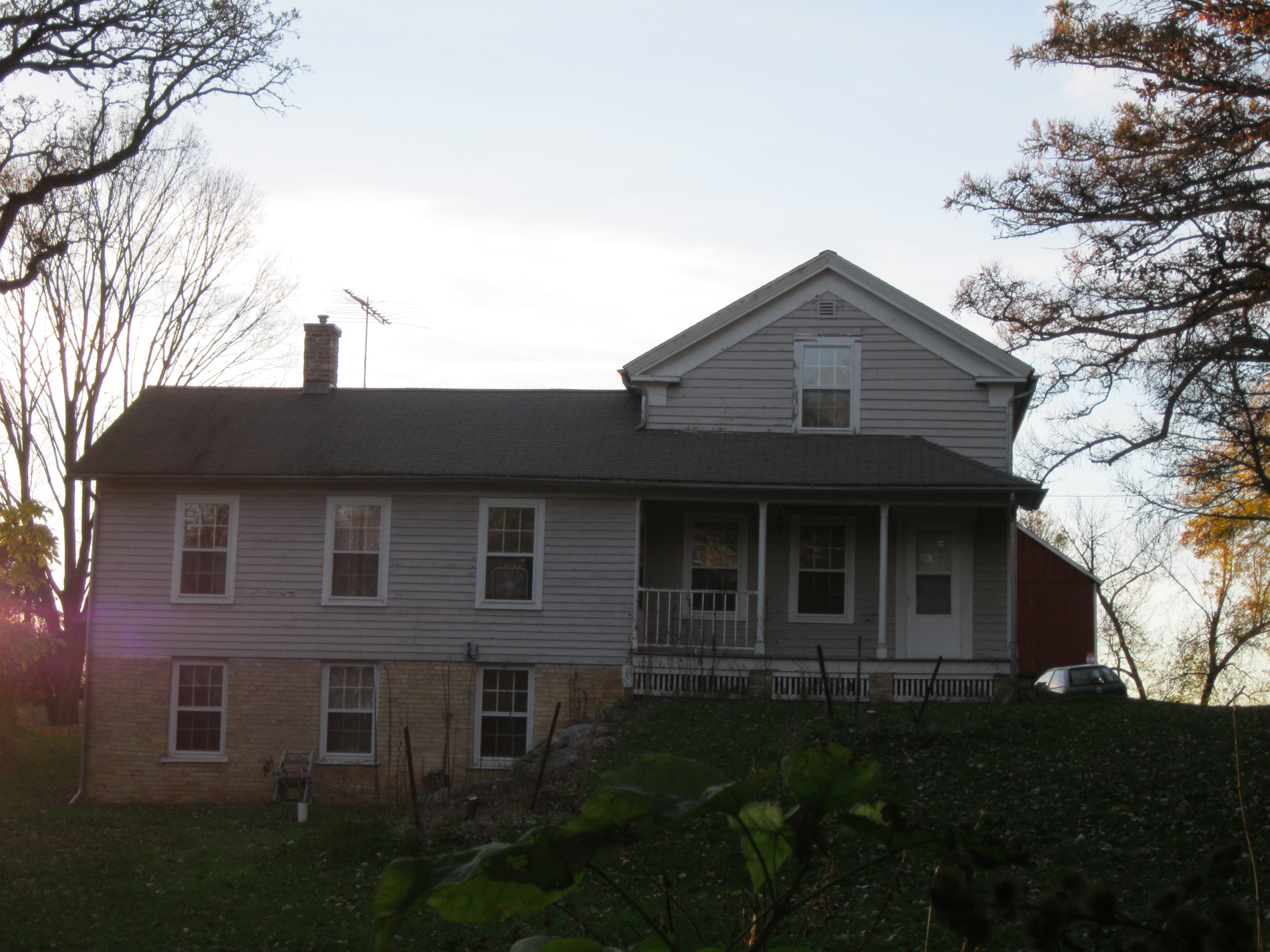
- The 1854–55 farmhouse

- Location within Wisconsin
- Location: 4926 Lacy Rd., Fitchburg, Wisconsin
- Coordinates: 43°00′08″N 89°22′42″W
- Area: 5.5 acres (2.2 ha)
- Built: c. 1854–55
- Architectural style: Greek Revival
- NRHP reference No.: 93001162
- Added to NRHP: October 29, 1993

The Nicholas Haight Farmstead is a historic farm at 4926 Lacy Road in Fitchburg, Wisconsin. Edwin Spooner of Massachusetts established the farm in the 1850s after purchasing the land from speculator John Catlin. Spooner built the original section of the farm's farmhouse in 1854–55; the two-story farmhouse is a vernacular gabled ell structure with Greek Revival elements, such as frieze boards and cornice returns on the front-facing gable. Nicholas Haight purchased the farm from Spooner in 1867, and he and his family owned the property well into the twentieth century. Haight ran a diverse farm, as was typical in Dane County at the time, growing wheat and raising dairy cattle, horses, sheep, and pigs. Haight added wings to the farmhouse four times, twice before 1880, and twice between 1880 and 1900. The farm also includes a nineteenth-century barn with an early twentieth-century silo, a smokehouse, a granary, and a corn crib.

The farm was added to the National Register of Historic Places on October 29, 1993.
