= West School (Stoughton, Wisconsin) =

- U.S. National Register of Historic Places
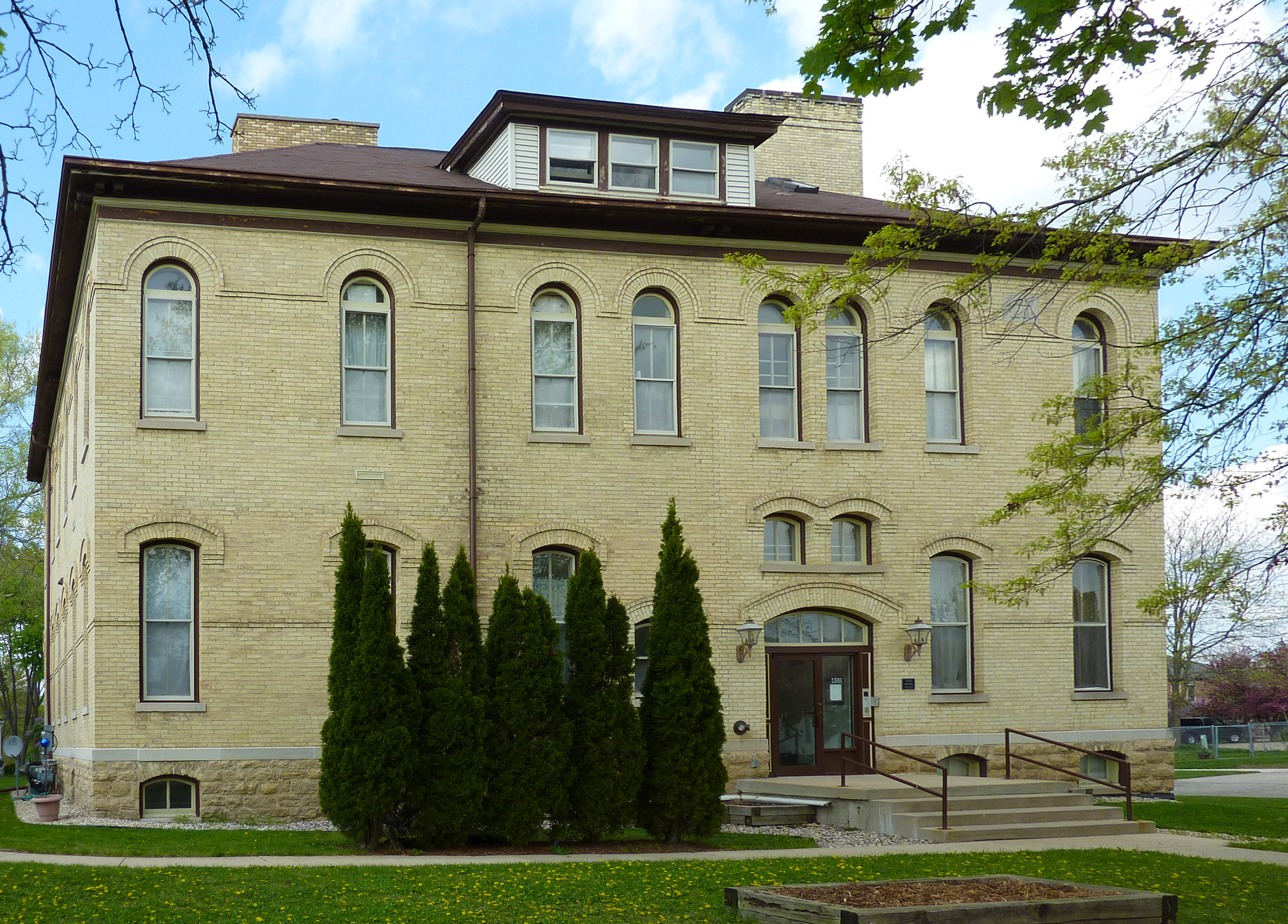

- Location within Wisconsin
- Location: 404 Garfield St., Stoughton, Wisconsin
- Coordinates: 42°54′52″N 89°13′30″W
- Area: less than one acre
- Built: 1886
- Architectural style: Italianate
- NRHP reference No.: 91001992
- Added to NRHP: January 22, 1992

West School is a historic school building at 404 Garfield Street in Stoughton, Wisconsin. The school was built in 1886; it was the first of several schools Stoughton built in the late nineteenth and early twentieth centuries to accommodate its rapidly growing population. The two-story brick building has an Italianate design with a segmental arched entrance and matching first-floor windows, semicircular arched windows on the second floor, brick belt courses, and a hipped roof with a wide dormer. As school overcrowding continued to be a problem even after the later construction of the East and South Schools, Stoughton elected to expand the West School in 1905; builder John Holmstad placed a matching addition on the building's west side that gave the school four new classrooms. Stoughton continued to use the school until 1982; it has since been converted to apartments.

The building was added to the National Register of Historic Places on January 22, 1992.
