= Bedrud-Olson Farmstead =

- Bedrud–Olson Farmstead
- U.S. National Register of Historic Places
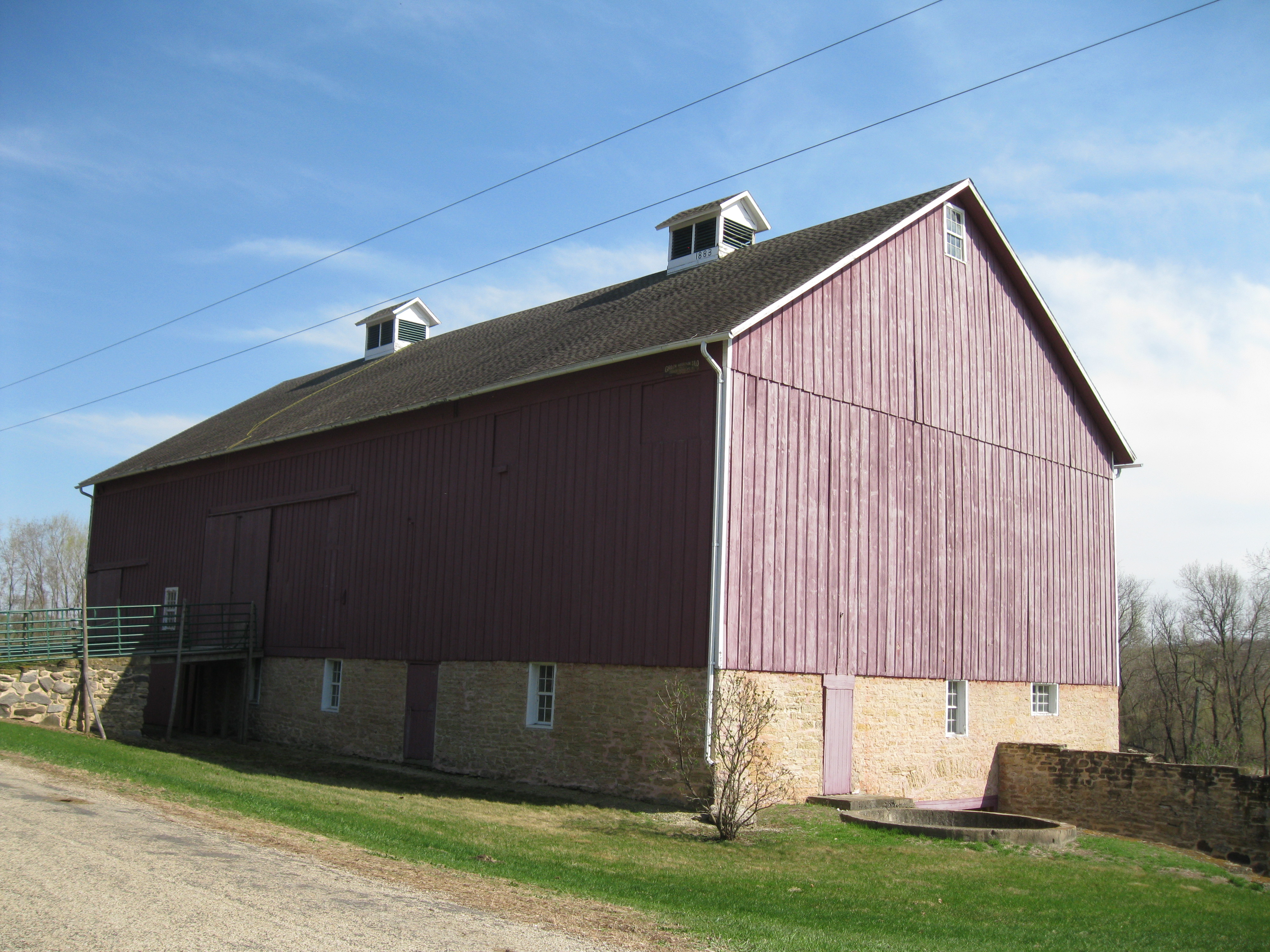
- Barn on the farmstead.
- Location: 996 E. Church Rd., Christiana, Dane County, Wisconsin
- Coordinates: 42°57′12″N 89°05′14″W
- Area: 3 acres (1.2 ha)
- Built: 1856
- Architectural style: Italianate
- NRHP reference No.: 99000429
- Added to NRHP: April 1, 1999

The Bedrud–Olson Farmstead is a highly intact tobacco and dairy farm with surviving buildings built between 1856 and 1915 in Christiana, Dane County, Wisconsin, United States. It was added to the State and the National Register of Historic Places in 1999.

In 1844, Tosten Lieberson Bedrud and Christie Gunderson Vossolt settled this farmstead after immigrating from Norway. They settled at the center of a small Norwegian farming community west of Lake Koshkonong. Tosten and Christie first built a dugout house near the site of the current house. At first they grew food to feed themselves.

By 1856 they had added wheat-farming to their business and seven children to the family. In that year they replaced the sod house with a wooden house, which survives as the east ell of the current house. Tosten died in 1857. His son Hellick Tostenson bought the farm in 1874 and by 1877 it totaled 198 acres. (Note that these immigrants were so fresh that they named Hellick following the old Scandinavian system where his surname was his father's name followed by 'son,' rather than a family name.)

Starting around the time of the Civil War, the farm began shifting from wheat to dairy, expanding the herd of cows. In 1883 Hellick built the current barn, with a limestone basement wall and cedar board and batten walls above. The barn had modern features for the time: two interior wood-stave silos, built in the year that the UW College of Agriculture first recommended silos for winter feeding. The barn also had calving pens, a gravity-driven water system, a manure disposal system, and ventilators. Those features remain largely unchanged, and were used into the 1960s. Also in 1883, the north-south ell of the house was added to make space for another family hired to help work the farm.

In 1889 Hellick's sister Anna and her husband Anton Olson, another Norwegian immigrant, bought the farm. By this time tobacco production was becoming a significant part of the business, with about 15 acres in cultivation - the broad-leafed variety used for cigar wrappers that is commonly grown around Dane County. In 1890 they built what is now the northernmost tobacco-curing shed near the field north of the buildings. Every third board on the side is hinged, which let the farmer control the amount of air reaching the curing leaves hanging inside. Two other old curing sheds were moved nearby in 1906 and 1908. A stripping shed was built nearby in 1910, where the workers stripped the cured leaves from the stalks and packed them into crates to be sold.

Henry and Martin Olson, sons of Anton and Anna, bought the farm in 1918, and farmed there into the 1970s. The old brothers changed the farm very little over the years. Other combination dairy/tobacco farms remain in the area, but this one is different in that it retains a full set of buildings from the late 1800s/early 1900s without newer buildings added.
