= Adam and Mary Smith House =

Historic house in Wisconsin, United States

- Smith, Adam and Mary, House
- U.S. National Register of Historic Places
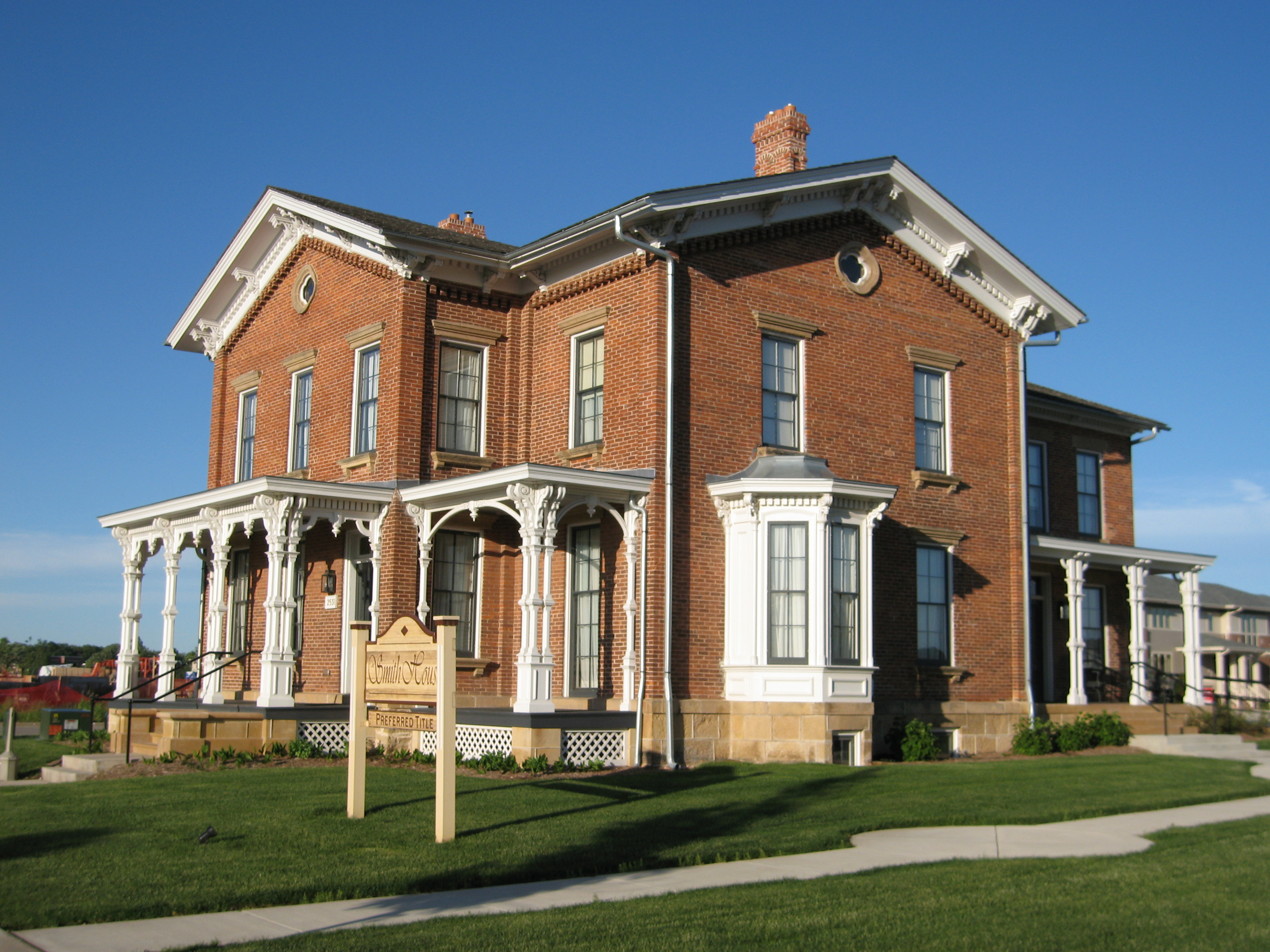

- Location within Wisconsin Location within the United States
- Location: Sun Prairie, Wisconsin
- Coordinates: 43°9′47.34″N 89°15′53.31″W
- Built: c.1872
- Architectural style: Italianate
- NRHP reference No.: 98000434
- Added to NRHP: April 30, 1998

The Adam and Mary Smith House was built in c.1872 by Adam Smith, who came to do shingle work on the Wisconsin State Capitol decades earlier. The home was done in Italianate style. It is located in Sun Prairie, Wisconsin.

The house was placed on the National Register of Historic Places in 1998. It is a two-story cross-gable main section with a two-story rear-gabled wing, built of load-bearing brick masonry walls. Italianate aspects include its scrolled brackets, limestone sills supported by brackets, brick dentil molding below the cornice, wood dentil molding above. It was built on a limestone ashlar foundation. The front facade's main feature is a one-story porch with a flat roof, single and triple columns, and scrolled brackets.

The house was renovated and relocated in 2004 a short distance to the east and now sits prominently in the "town square" of a new urbanism neighborhood called Smith's Crossing.
