= Oregon Masonic Hall (Oregon, Wisconsin) =

- Oregon Masonic Lodge
- U.S. National Register of Historic Places
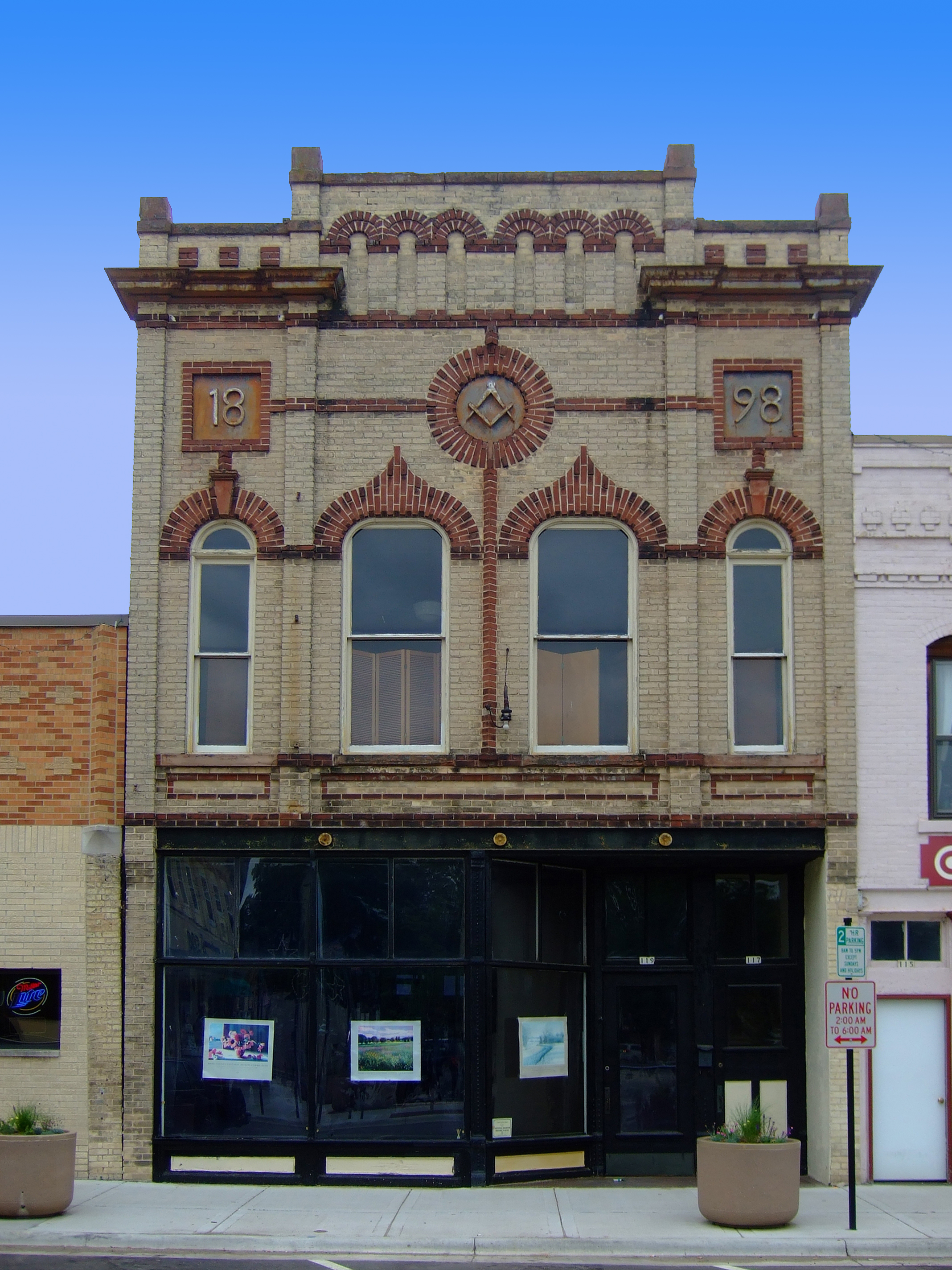
- The building's exterior in 2009

- Location within Wisconsin Location within the United States
- Location: 117-119 S. Main St., Oregon, Wisconsin
- Coordinates: 42°55′33″N 89°23′6″W
- Area: less than one acre
- Built: 1898
- Architectural style: Late Victorian, High Victorian Eclectic
- NRHP reference No.: 92000803
- Added to NRHP: June 18, 1992

The Oregon Masonic Hall or Oregon Masonic Lodge is a highly-intact 1898 building in Oregon, Wisconsin - with the second story finely decorated using cream and red brick and red sandstone. It was listed on the National Register of Historic Places in 1992.

Oregon's Masonic Lodge 151 was chartered in 1865. The lodge built a hall at 134 S. Main and met there until 1873, when it burned. After the fire they met in the Netherwood Block for about 20 years. In 1898 H.H. Marvin, one of their members, offered that the lodge could build a new hall above his new store. That combination became the structure that is the subject of this article.

The building is two stories, with a 25 feet (7.6 m) by 86 feet (26 m) footprint. It was built with a cast iron storefront with three show windows at street-level, and that storefront still exists. Above that, the masons decorated their hall's facade with multi-colored brickwork which highlights oriental-flavored ogee arches above the two large windows, the Mason's square and compass symbol, and a parapet high above.

Originally the stone basement housed a barber shop, accessed by an outside stairwell which no longer exists. The first floor of the building was occupied by Marvin's hardware store. The Masons occupied the second story, with the space divided into a reception room, a bathroom, ante-rooms, and a lodge room with raised platforms along the outside walls.

The building was deemed to be "an outstanding and highly intact example of late nineteenth century eclectic commercial design." It includes Late Victorian and "High Victorian Eclectic" architecture and has served as a meeting hall and as a specialty store.
