= John Sweet Donald Farmstead =

- U.S. National Register of Historic Places
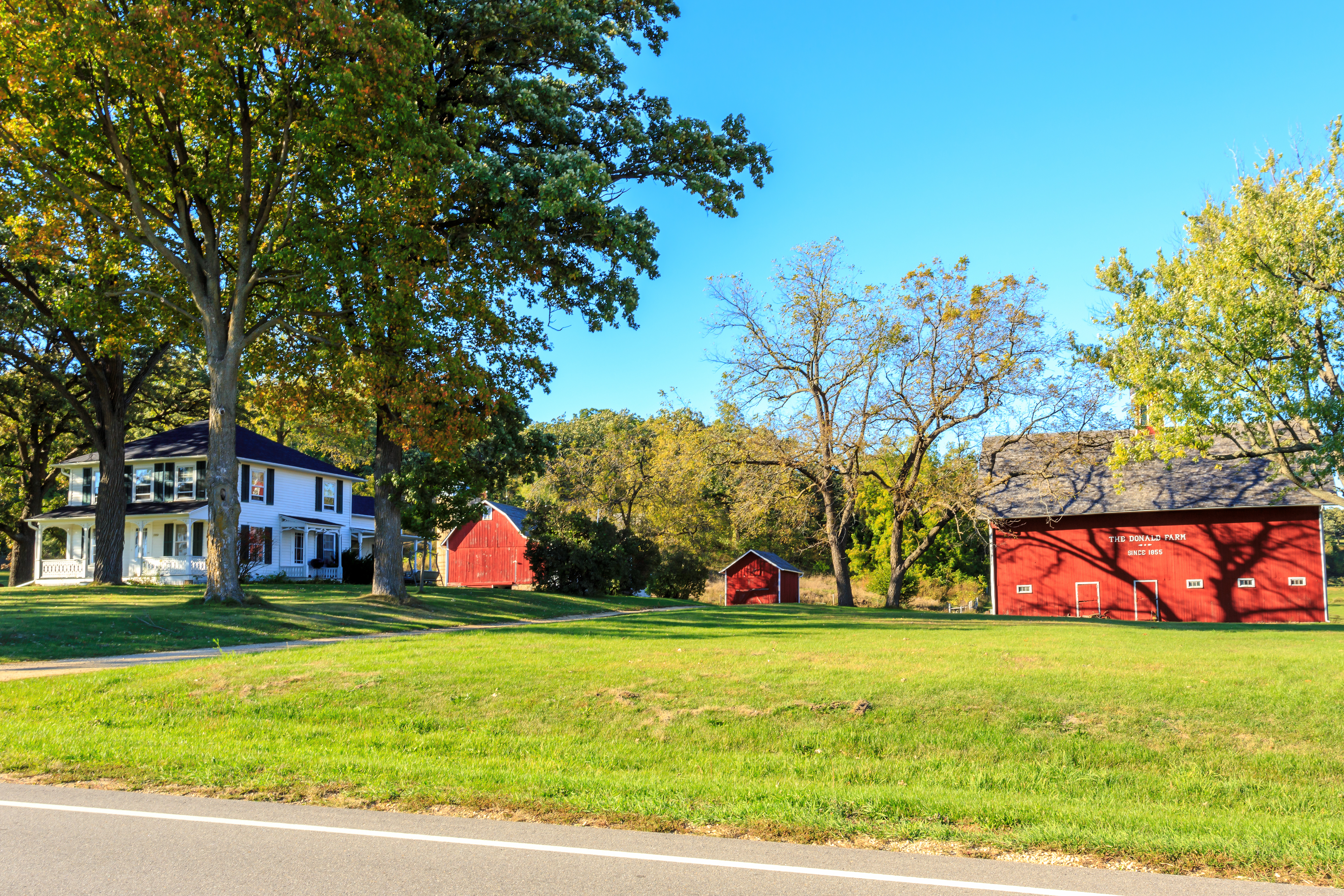
- John Sweet Donald Farmstead
- Location: 1972 State Highway 92, Mount Horeb, Wisconsin
- Nearest city: Springdale, Wisconsin
- Coordinates: 42°57′52″N 89°41′08″W
- Area: 2.3 acres (0.93 ha)
- Built: 1858
- Architectural style: Mid 19th Century Revival
- NRHP reference No.: 84003633
- Added to NRHP: June 7, 1984

The John Sweet Donald Farmstead is a historic farm in Springdale, Wisconsin with surviving structures built as early as 1858. It is significant as the home and testing grounds of John Sweet Donald, a farmer, statesman, and educator of the Progressive Era.

== History ==
Settlement of the Springdale area began around 1845. By the 1850s about 100 Scotch families were settled among other immigrants along the Sugar River. The Rev. James Donald, an immigrant from Scotland, came to serve the Presbyterian parishes at Mount Horeb and Mt. Vernon, and in 1855 he bought 80 acres in the country between the two churches, at the southwest edge of the Scotch settlement. He brought his wife Margaret Strong and three sons. For the first few years they lived in a temporary shelter northwest of the current house, which no longer exists. They dug the well west of the house about 1858, lining it with limestone they quarried, probably right on the farm. They built some log out-buildings, and around 1859 built the first section of the current farmhouse.

That first section is now the southernmost 2-story cube with the hip roof - the white structure in the photo. It sits on a limestone rubble foundation. Some of the beams in the basement are rough-hewn, still bearing the marks of an adze. The walls are of wood, filled with brick nogging for insulation. The current wide front porch and the additions to the north were added later, but the library on the second floor was there from the start. Holding Rev. Donald's classical and religious texts, it was where he prepared his sermons.

The farm was run mainly by the son John Strong Donald at that time. The main cash crop was wheat - in 1860, the farm produced 245 bushels. In that year the family had six meat cattle, five pigs, and six milk cows. The cows produced 200 pounds of butter, some of which was sold. Rev. James died in 1866 at 76 years. His son John died just two years later - only 26 years old. A few months later his new wife Ellen Sweet Donald gave birth to John Sweet Donald. Ellen managed the farm with help from her father next door until 1882 when she married John Jones, who ran the gristmill in Mount Vernon. They gradually bought adjacent farms, expanding the whole to 407 acres by the 1890s.

During this period the Donald farm transitioned from wheat to dairy, and added buildings. They added a 51-foot "cow barn" in 1875; only its foundation remains. They built the buggy shed around 1887, a tall building with walls of vertical board and batten. A second well was drilled in 1889, and a wood windmill was erected over it. In 1892 they added the horse barn, sixty feet long with timbers joined by mortise and tenon, walls of vertical board, and a gambrel roof topped with a tall wooden ventilator - at right in the photo. Around 1890 they expanded the house with the addition of the rear kitchen wing. The front and side porches were added around the same time, with the scroll-sawn pickets and the quatrefoil decoration in the upper brackets. The washroom beyond the kitchen was added ca. 1892, clad in vertical board and batten.

Young John Sweet Donald grew up on the farm. The 1870, census lists only 2-year-old John, his mother, and a schoolteacher as living there. The 1880 census adds his grandfather William Sweet and an aunt. John attended the local school, then graduated from Northwestern Business College in Madison in 1887, then Valparaiso University in 1894, and from the Chicago Dental College with a Doctor of Dental Surgery degree in 1897. In 1898, he married Vona DeCrow and began to manage the enlarged farm after his stepfather died. John and Vona had a daughter Delma the following year. In 1906 they had a neighbor build the playhouse/dollhouse east of the house for Delma, with walls of horizontal bark-clad slabs.

In 1899, John became town chairman and chaired the Dane County Board of Supervisors. In 1902 he was elected to the Wisconsin Assembly as a Progressive Republican, generally aligning with Robert LaFollette. He was seen as representing the Wisconsin farmer, and from 1903 to 1907 chaired the Assembly's Dairy and Foods Committee, which prepared Wisconsin's Pure Foods Act. He was active in bills to regulate railroad rates and to provide for grain inspection. He also supported workmen's compensation, income tax reform and primary elections. In 1908 he was elected state senator for Dane County. He chaired the Senate's Joint Education Committee, supporting vocation agriculture courses in primary and high schools. He worked for the Good Roads Movement in Wisconsin, supporting the 1908 amendment to the state constitution that allowed the state - not only local governments - to improve roads that were impassable much of the year, allowing agricultural products to reach there markets, among other aims. In 1911 he sponsored the bill to support the centralized highway program, which was called "the Donald Bill." In 1912, he was elected Wisconsin Secretary of State. In that role he initiated a lawsuit which recovered $95,000 in lost fees from the Northern Pacific Railway.

John stayed involved with the farm during his political career. He was interested in then-new ideas to make farming more productive. He raised purebred animals: registered shorthorn dairy cattle, Berkshire hogs, and purebred Percheron draft horses. By 1907 he was putting lime on his fields in addition to manure. He started growing alfalfa which improved the soil, and he managed his hay fields to produce three cuttings per year, rather than the usual two. He probably employed a steam tractor on the farm around this time. He built a new dairy barn in 1907 - better lit and better ventilated. He attended meetings on silos when fermented silage was a fairly new and unproven idea, and he had at least one silo built in 1908, aiming to keep his cows producing milk through the winter months.

Toward the end of World War I, John went to France to represent YMCA, then served as an ag educator for the Army Education Corps. After he returned from France in 1919 he served briefly as Assistant in Farm Management in the USDA. In 1921 he became assistant professor of agricultural economics at the UW - a farm market specialist. From that position he advocated treating farming as a business, using careful record-keeping to determine the profitability of different parts of a farm.

John still owned his own farm through his time in Madison and relied on tenant farmers to operate it. He established a 50/50 shared rent program, with costs and profits shared between tenant and owner. This arrangement gave the tenant more incentive to maintain the farm and stay there than renting did.

John retired in 1930 and died four years later. His wife Vona and daughter Delma managed the farm until Vona died in 1973. Velma continued managing the farm until 1998.

The farmstead was added to the National Register of Historic Places in 1984 and the State Register of Historic Places in 2000, deemed significant:

- ...for its connection to John Sweet Donald, a person important in Wisconsin's Progressive era politics and in education. Many surviving features of the farm demonstrate Donald's ideas on farm management.
- ...as a largely-intact example of a turn-of-the-century farmstead in southern Wisconsin.
