= Wisconsin's Dane County 3rd Assembly district =

Former American legislative district

Wisconsin's Dane County 3rd State Assembly district
- Obsolete
- Notes: 1848–1972

Wisconsin's Dane County 3rd Assembly district was a district in the Wisconsin State Assembly for most of the history of the state of Wisconsin, up to the legislative redistricting reforms of 1972 which created the current numbered districts. Located in central Wisconsin, the district was one of the 66 original Assembly districts defined in Article XIV of the Constitution of Wisconsin; it originally comprised the southeast quadrant of Dane County, Wisconsin.

The district was in use for the first 124 years of Wisconsin's history, from 1848 to 1972.

== List of representatives ==
List of representatives from the Dane County 3rd district
Member	Party	Residence	Term start	Term end	Leg.
District created
Samuel H. Roys	Dem.	Stoughton; Dunkirk	June 5, 1848	January 7, 1850	1st 2nd
Oliver Bryant	Dem.	Rutland	January 7, 1850	January 6, 1851	3rd
Gabriel Bjornson	Dem.	Perry	January 6, 1851	January 5, 1852	4th
Hiram Giles	Whig	Stoughton	January 5, 1852	January 3, 1853	5th
Storer Field	Whig	Fitchburg	January 3, 1853	January 2, 1854	6th
Peter W. Matts	Whig	Montrose	January 2, 1854	January 1, 1855	7th
Samuel G. Abbott	Rep.	Verona	January 1, 1855	January 7, 1856	8th
William M. Colladay	Rep.	Dunn	January 7, 1856	January 5, 1857	9th
Robert P. Main	Rep.	Oregonhton	January 5, 1857	January 4, 1858	10th
Storer Field	Rep.	Fitchburg	January 4, 1858	January 3, 1859	11th
John Keenan	Dem.	Fitchburg	January 3, 1859	January 2, 1860	12th
John Beath	Dem.	Verona	January 2, 1860	January 7, 1861	13th
Edward W. Dwight	Rep.	Oregon	January 7, 1861	January 6, 1862	14th
Alden Sprague Sanborn	Dem.	Mazomanie	January 6, 1862	January 2, 1865	15th 16th 17th
David Ford	Dem.	Leicester	January 2, 1865	January 1, 1866	18th
George H. Slaughter	Dem.	Mendota	January 1, 1866	January 7, 1867	19th
Frank Gault	Dem.	Mendota	January 7, 1867	January 4, 1869	20th 21st
John Adams	Dem.	Black Earth	January 4, 1869	January 2, 1871	22nd 23rd
Matthew Anderson	Dem.	Cross Plains	January 2, 1871	January 1, 1872	24th
John Adams	Dem.	Black Earth	January 1, 1872	January 6, 1873	25th
Otto Kerl	Dem.	Berry	January 6, 1873	January 5, 1874	26th
John Kehl	Con.D.	Vermont	January 5, 1874	January 4, 1875	27th
David Ford	Dem.	Waunakee	January 4, 1875	January 3, 1876	28th
Peter Zander	Dem.	Cross Plains	January 3, 1876	January 1, 1877	29th
George Weeks	Rep.	York	January 1, 1877	January 7, 1878	30th
John Ollis	Rep.	Vienna	January 7, 1878	January 6, 1879	31st
Charles G. Lewis	Rep.	Sun Prairie	January 6, 1879	January 5, 1880	32nd
Charles G. Crosse	Rep.	Sun Prairie	January 5, 1880	January 3, 1881	33rd
Henry B. Howe	Rep.	Cottage Grove	January 3, 1881	January 2, 1882	34th
Francis Leander Warner	Rep.	Medina	January 2, 1882	January 1, 1883	35th
Henry Cullen Adams	Rep.	Madison	January 1, 1883	January 3, 1887	36th 37th
Richard D. Frost	Rep.	Blooming Grove	January 3, 1887	January 7, 1889	38th
Peter O. Baker	Rep.	Primrose	January 7, 1889	January 5, 1891	39th
Joseph R. Henderson	Dem.	Springdale	January 5, 1891	January 2, 1893	40th
Nels Holman	Rep.	Deerfield	January 2, 1893	January 7, 1895	41st
Ole C. Lee	Rep.	Stoughton	January 7, 1895	January 4, 1897	42nd
Oscar F. Minch	Dem.	Montrose	January 4, 1897	January 7, 1901	43rd 44th
Herman Fessenfeld	Dem.	Black Earth	January 7, 1901	January 5, 1903	45th
John Sweet Donald	Rep.	Mount Horeb	January 5, 1903	January 7, 1907	46th 47th
Thomas A. Stewart	Dem.	Verona	January 7, 1907	January 2, 1911	48th 49th
Arthur H. Sholts	Rep.	Oregon	January 2, 1911	January 6, 1913	50th
Thomas A. Stewart	Dem.	Verona	January 6, 1913	January 1, 1917	51st 52nd
Homer A. Stone	Rep.	Fitchburg	January 1, 1917	January 6, 1919	53rd
Carl M. Grimstad	Rep.	Mount Horeb	January 6, 1919	January 5, 1925	54th 55th 56th
James C. Hanson	Rep.	Deerfield	January 5, 1925	January 3, 1927	57th
Albert J. Baker	Rep.	Mount Horeb	January 3, 1927	January 7, 1935	58th 59th 60th 61st
Albert J. Baker	Prog.	Mount Horeb	January 7, 1935	January 2, 1939	62nd 63rd
Otto F. Toepfer	Rep.	Middleton	January 2, 1939	January 6, 1941	64th
Albert J. Baker	Prog.	Mount Horeb	January 6, 1941	January 6, 1947	65th 66th
Rudy W. Roethlisberger	Rep.	Verona	January 1, 1945	January 3, 1949	67th 68th
Hermann Eisner	Dem.	Cross Plains	January 3, 1949	January 5, 1953	69th 70th
Ervin M. Bruner	Dem.	Verona	January 5, 1953	January 3, 1955	71st
Carroll Metzner	Rep.	Madison	January 3, 1955	January 5, 1959	72nd 73rd
Richard Cates	Dem.	Madison	January 5, 1959	January 2, 1961	74th
Robert Uehling	Rep.	Madison	January 2, 1961	January 4, 1971	75th 76th 77th 78th 79th
Midge Miller	Dem.	Madison	January 4, 1971	January 1, 1973	80th
District abolished by 1971 Wisconsin Act 304; Dane County was divided between the 37th, 38th, 46th, 47th, 50th, 76th, 77th, and 78th Assembly districts The Dane County 3rd district did not have a close analogue in the new map
