= Hauge Log Church =

Historic church in Wisconsin, United States

- U.S. National Register of Historic Places
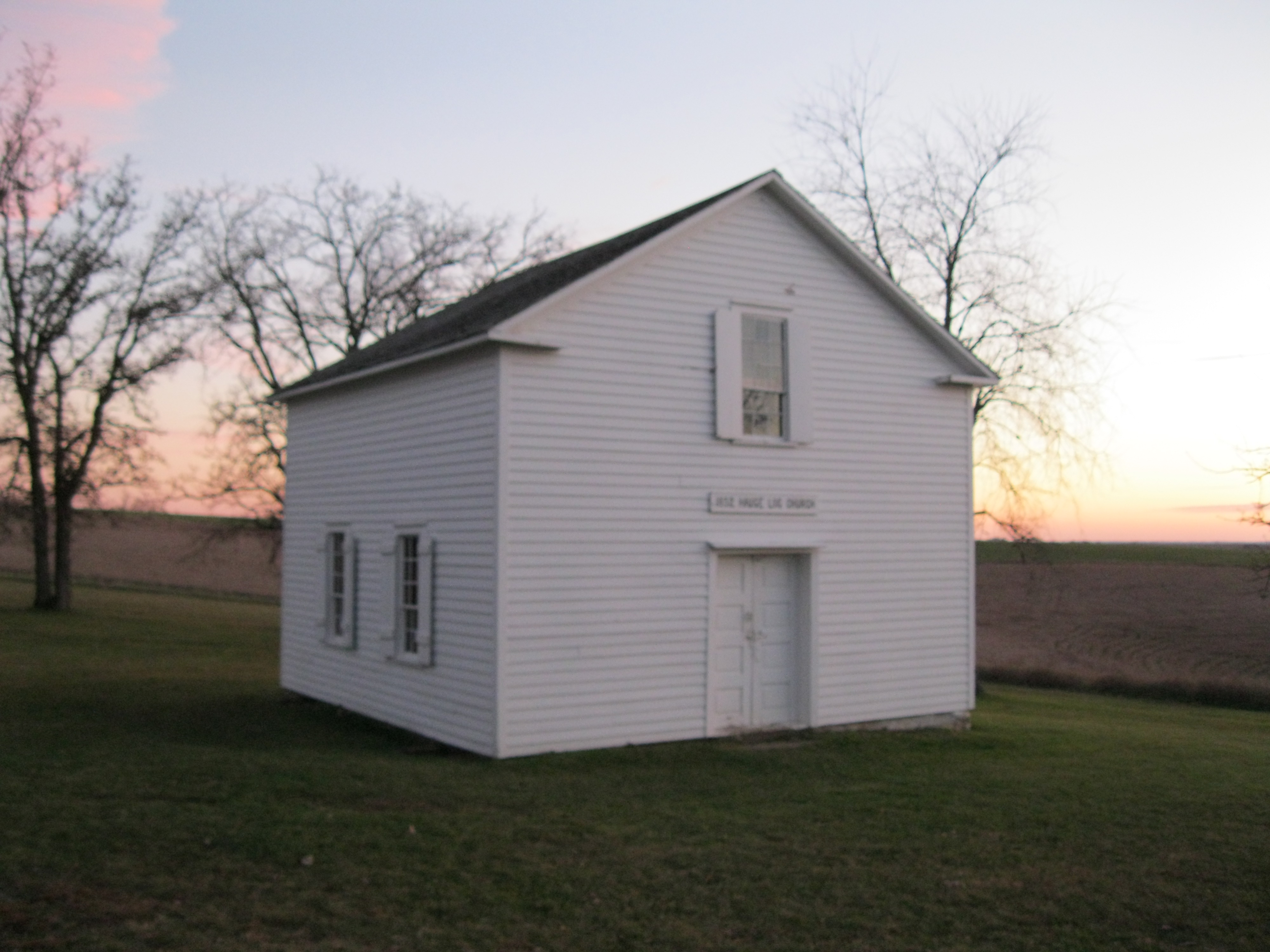

- Location within Wisconsin Location within the United States
- Location: County Road Z Daleyville, Wisconsin
- Coordinates: 42°55′48″N 89°49′13″W
- Area: less than one acre
- Built: 1852
- NRHP reference No.: 74000071
- Added to NRHP: December 31, 1974

The Hauge Log Church is located near the community of Daleyville in the town of Perry, Wisconsin. It was the first Norwegian Lutheran Church constructed in western Wisconsin. Hauge Log Church is located on County Highway Z just off State Highway 78. The historic building was added to the National Register of Historic Places in 1974. A Historic District Park open year round was created by the residents of the Town of Perry in 2001 to surround and protect its scenic views and serenity from development in perpetuity.

== History ==
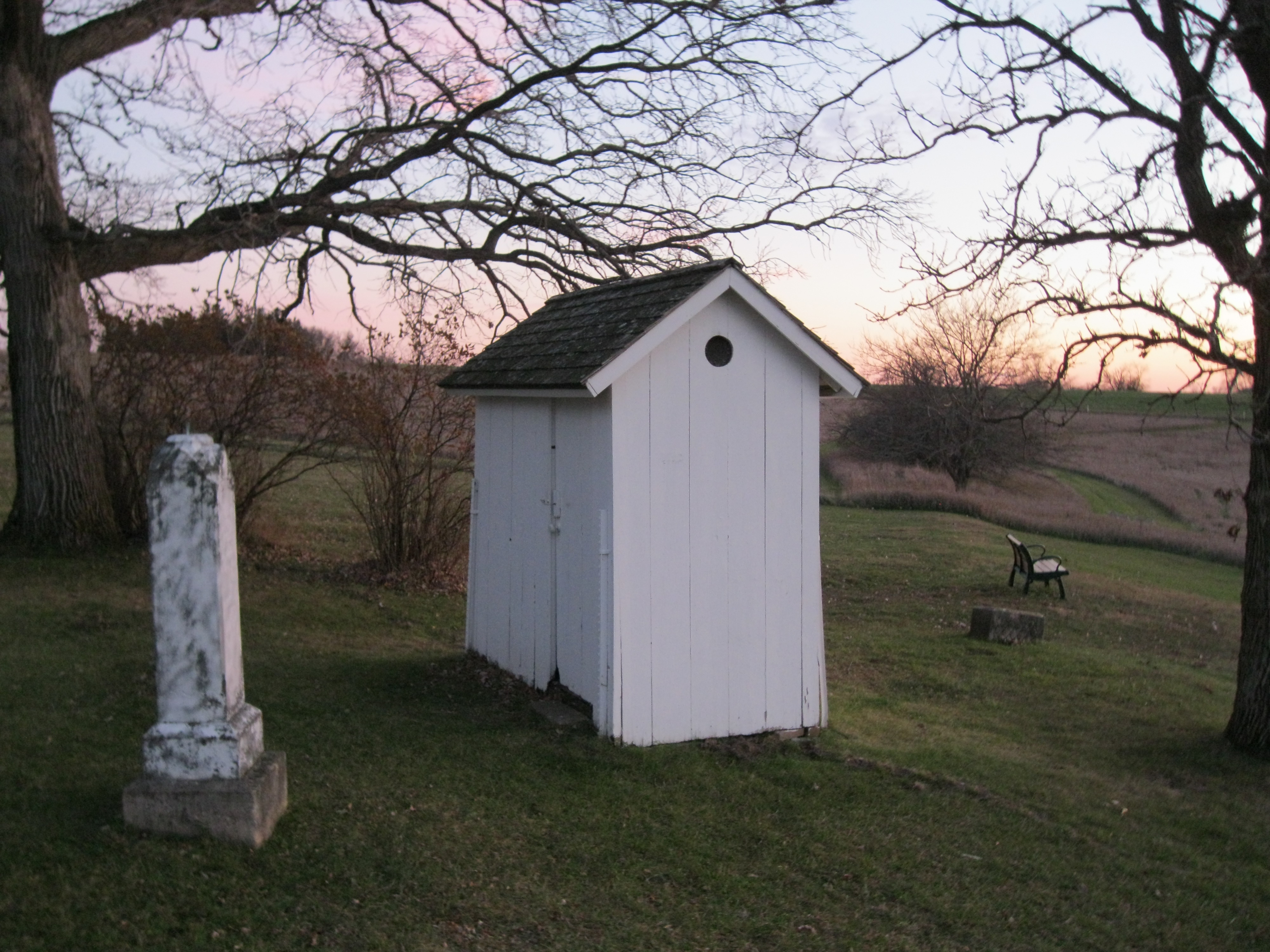
Outhouse behind the church

By 1851 two flavors of Norwegian Lutherans had settled around the area where the Hauge Church would be built: Lutherans loyal to the Norwegian state church, and other Lutherans who preferred the ideas of Hans Nielsen Hauge, a reformer back in Norway who had been jailed by the state church. Neither group had a church building, so these unlikely bedfellows agreed to build one together. Logs for the church were cut and drawn in 1851. Labor was donated by the members, with each man assigned a number of logs to cut and prepare. Construction completed in 1852.

The walls are built of oak logs. At first the logs were exposed on the outside, but later they were covered with clapboard. Inside, the logs are coated with a thin plaster. The church is still furnished with the original pews, pulpit, altar rail, and a small balcony.

The church was the first Norwegian Lutheran Church in its area. Adjacent to the church is a small cemetery where members of the first congregation are buried.

The state-churchers and the Haugeans shared the building for a bit, but conflict soon arose, becoming hot enough that one group locked the other out of the building. In December 1858 the state-church congregation completed their own structure, now the Perry Lutheran Church in nearby Daleyville, Wisconsin.

The Haugean (haugianere) congregation remained in the original log church some 35 years until 1887 when a new larger building was constructed approximately two miles east. In 1927 the church building was restored. The Dane County Wisconsin Historical Society recognized the site for its historical significance, and dedicated a Historic Marker there in 1964.

Since 1966, care of Hauge Log Church has been entrusted to the Perry Hauge Log Church Preservation Association, Inc. The 30-acre Hauge Historic Park was established in 2001 by the Town of Perry for the purpose of protecting the Hauge Log Church historic site. The park is open to the public year round seven days a week from sunrise to half hour after sunset. The pioneer sanctuary has been made available to host concerts, weddings, family events, celebration and other special occasions.
