= Eric and Jerome Skindrud Farm =

- U.S. National Register of Historic Places
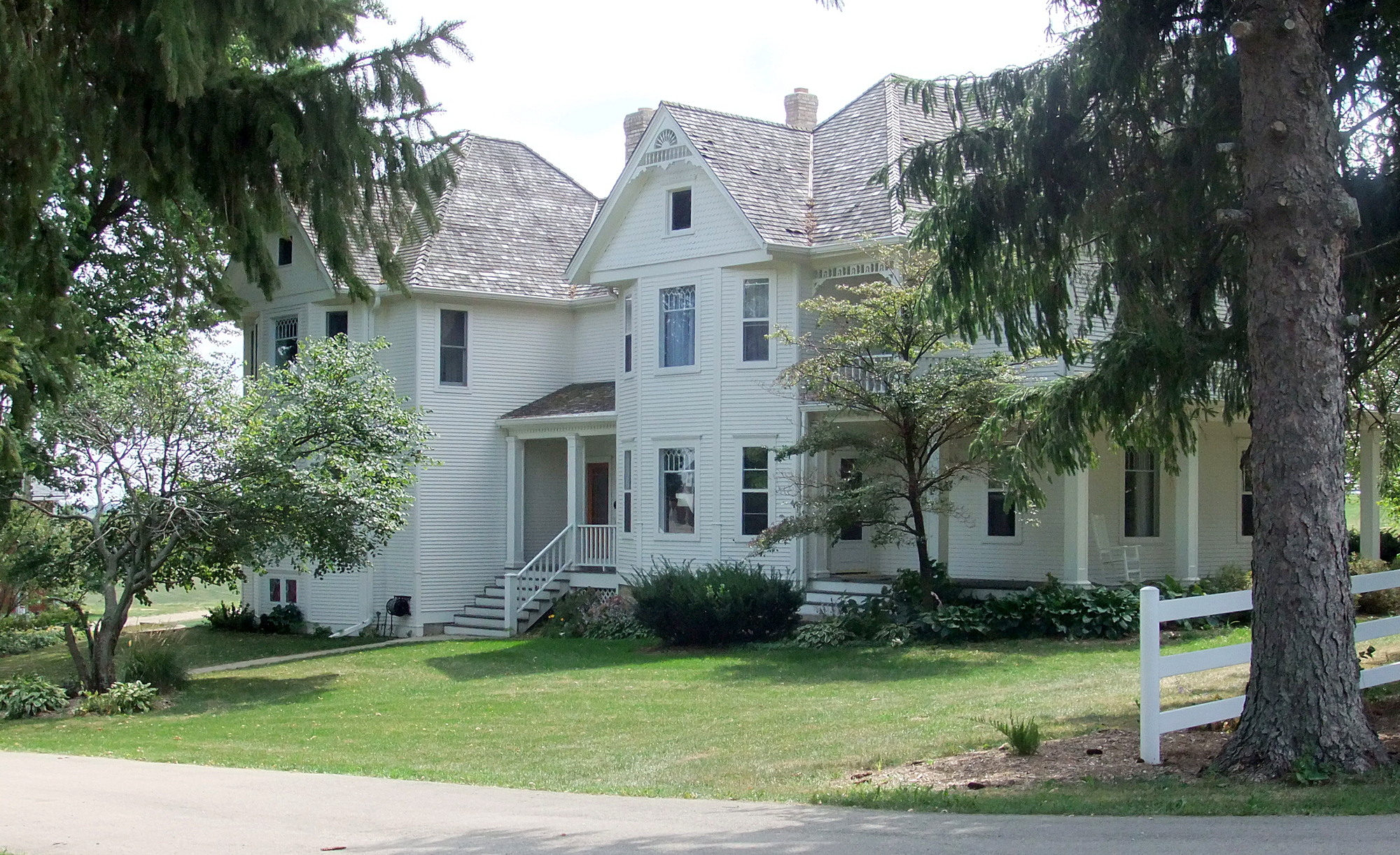
- Eric and Jerome Skindrud Farm
- Location: 3070 Town Hall Rd., Springdale, Wisconsin
- Area: 235.7 acres (95.4 ha)
- Architect: Thosten and Henry Thompson
- Architectural style: Queen Anne
- NRHP reference No.: 94001156
- Added to NRHP: September 26, 1994

The Eric and Jerome Skindrud Farm is a farm started by Norwegian immigrants in Springdale, Wisconsin with intact farm buildings as old as 1876. The farm lies in a big valley prone to erosion and was early to try out erosion control dams and planting crops in contour strips. In 1994 the farm was added to the State and the National Register of Historic Places.

In 1856 Thosten Thompson-Rue and his wife Guri Gaarden bought 240 acres on the south side of a large ridge which the early Military Road passed on. Thosten was born in Norway in 1819, and immigrated to America in 1839, following the Erie Canal and the Great Lakes to Wisconsin. He joined his mother and brother in Missouri, but after his mother went west with the Mormons, the two brothers returned to Wisconsin. His brother shortly headed west to and made a name as Snowshoe Thompson, delivering mail in the Sierra Nevadas, in winter using ski techniques he had learned in Norway. Meanwhile, with their farm on the major early road heading west through Dane County, the Thompsons hosted hundreds of Norwegian immigrants looking for new homes in a new land.

By 1876 the Thomsons were transitioning from wheat-farming to dairy, and Thosten and his son Henry built a large dairy barn with a 34x100 foot footprint - the gable-roofed section of the barn that still stands today. The basement story has walls of stone built into the hillside, and has a typical dairy set-up, with stanchions for the cows. Above, a ramp gives drive-in access to the haymow for unloading. The gambrel-roofed section of the barn was added around 1915 and the milk house around 1940. Henry married Annie Skindrud.

Thosten died in 1880, and his son Henry took over the farm. In 1909 Henry built an impressive new house - two stories, wood-framed, with a cross-gable roof. The styling was Queen Anne, with shingles covering the attic gables and ornate spindle-work decorating the gable peaks. Shallow bays protrude here and there. The front porch is supported by Doric columns and decorated with a classical frieze. The back porch is more typical Queen Anne: turned posts supporting spindlework across the top. Inside are oak floors, pocket doors, a built-in buffet, and brass light fixtures.

In 1914, Henry Thompson moved to a different farm, selling the original farm to Jacob Stolen. In 1920, Martin Skindrud managed to buy it, bringing it back into the family.

The whole farm lies in a valley with a gully down the middle. By the 1930s erosion must have become a concern because Jerome and Eric Skindrud asked the ASC office to help put in contour strips for their crops. The work was done by a Civilian Conservation Corps camp in Mt. Horeb. The CCCs also built two stone dams in the gully below the farm buildings, 10 feet across and 5 feet high, out of limestone that they quarried. This was probably in 1934.

In 1994 the farm was listed on the NRHP for its largely intact farm buildings going back to 1876. It is also significant as perhaps the first farm in the area to adopt soil conservation measures.
