= Jensvold =

Jensvold is a surname. Notable people with this surname include:

- Leo Jensvold (1908–1966), American football player
- Lloyd Jensvold (1908–1981), American football player, twin brother of Leo
- Mary Lee Jensvold, senior lecturer at Central Washington University

== Other ==
- Gulbrand and Bertha Jensvold House, historic farmhouse in Perry, Wisconsin
