= John Donald (Wisconsin politician) =

American politician (1869–1934)

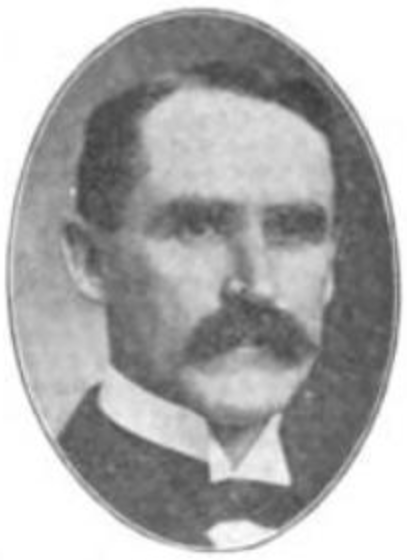

19th Secretary of State of Wisconsin
- In office January 6, 1913 – January 1, 1917
- Governor: Francis E. McGovern; Emanuel L. Philipp
- Preceded by: James A. Frear
- Succeeded by: Merlin Hull

Member of the Wisconsin Senate from the 26th district
- In office January 4, 1909 – January 6, 1913
- Preceded by: Albert M. Stondall
- Succeeded by: Henry Huber

Member of the Wisconsin State Assembly from the Dane County 3rd district
- In office January 5, 1903 – January 7, 1907
- Preceded by: Herman Fessenfeld
- Succeeded by: Thomas A. Stewart

Personal details
- Born: John Sweet Donald; January 12, 1869 Springdale, Wisconsin, U.S.
- Died: January 10, 1934 (aged 64) Madison, Wisconsin, U.S.
- Resting place: Mount Horeb Union Cemetery, Mount Horeb, Wisconsin
- Party: Republican
- Spouse: Vona Deliliah DeCrow
- Children: 3
- Education: Valparaiso University
- Occupation: Dentist, politician

John Sweet Donald (January 12, 1869 – January 10, 1934) was an American dentist and Republican politician from Dane County, Wisconsin. He served as the 19th Secretary of State of Wisconsin, from 1913 to 1917. He previously served four years each in the Wisconsin Senate (1909–1913) and state Assembly (1903–1907).

== Biography ==
Born on a farm near Mount Vernon, Wisconsin, in the town of Springdale, Dane County, Wisconsin, Donald graduated from Northwestern Business College in 1887, in Madison, Wisconsin. He then graduated with a bachelor of science degree from Valparaiso University in 1894. In 1897, Donald received a degree in dentistry from the Chicago College. He was Wisconsin's nineteenth Secretary of State, serving two terms from January 6, 1913, to January 1, 1917. He was a Republican and served under governors Francis E. McGovern and Emanuel L. Philipp. He resided in Mt. Horeb, Wisconsin, at the time of his election. He served as the Springdale town assessor in 1892. He served as chairman of the Springdale Town Board from 1899 to 1902. Donald served in the Wisconsin State Assembly from 1903 to 1907. He served in the Wisconsin State Senate from 1907 to 1913. He also owned farms in the town of Springdale and taught agriculture at the University of Wisconsin since 1920. Donald died at his home in Madison from a two-year illness.

One of his farms, now known as the John Sweet Donald Farmstead, is listed on the National Register of Historic Places.

== Notes ==
Party political offices
Preceded by James A. Frear	Republican nominee for Secretary of State of Wisconsin; 1912, 1914	Succeeded by Merlin Hull
Political offices
Preceded by James Frear	Secretary of State of Wisconsin; 1913–1917	Succeeded by Merlin Hull
