= Onon B. and Betsy Dahle House =

Historic house in Wisconsin, United States

- U.S. National Register of Historic Places
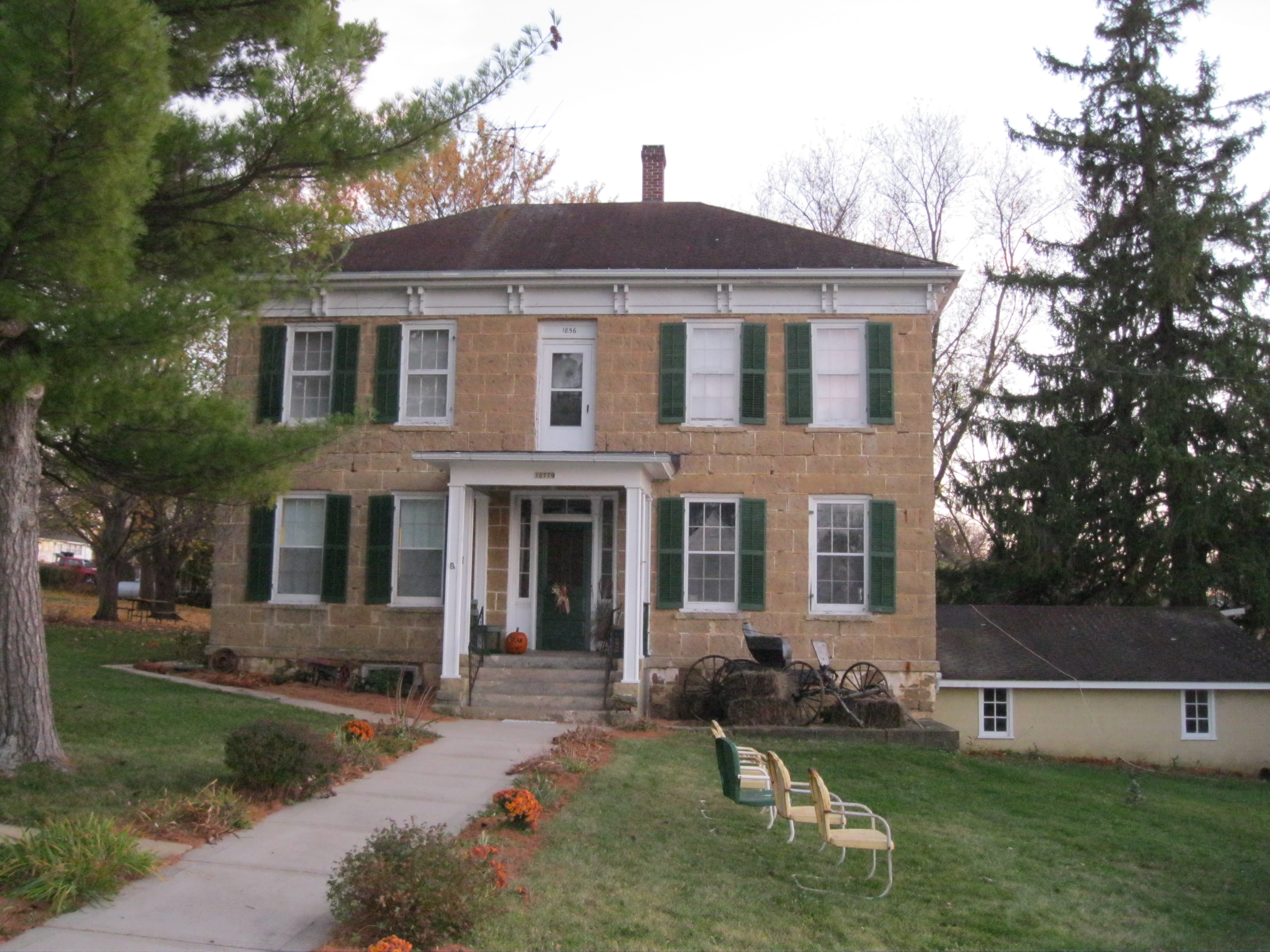

- Location within Wisconsin Location within the United States
- Location: 10779 Evergreen Ave. Daleyville, Wisconsin
- Coordinates: 42°54′57″N 89°48′56″W
- Area: 1.3 acres (0.53 ha)
- Built: 1864
- Architectural style: Italianate/Greek Revival
- NRHP reference No.: 08000322
- Added to NRHP: April 16, 2008

The Onon B. and Betsy Dahle House a Greek Revival-styled house built in 1864 in the community of Daleyville, Wisconsin in the town of Perry, Wisconsin. It was added to the National Register of Historic Places in 2008.

== History ==
Onon Bjornson Dahle was born in 1823 in Upper Telemark, Norway. After attending normal school in Hvideseid and teaching for six years, he emigrated to America in 1848. He taught school in Norwegian around Christiana for a winter, worked the harvest, and cut cordwood near St. Louis with his brother. In 1850 the brothers and three Scandinavian partners headed west across the plains with three yoke of oxen for the gold fields of California, a trip which Onon later described as "hungry horrors." Eventually they had some success mining gold and returned to the Midwest in 1851.

In 1853, Onon and his freshly-immigrated brother Tarjie settled in the new Norwegian settlement in Perry. Onon bought forty acres on a ridge with good access to the Military Ridge Road - not the best farmland, but a good site for a trading center and town. He built a store and log cabin there, and set up a private service to bring the mail in seven miles from the post office at Blue Mounds once a week. He prospered, and married Betsy Nelson in 1854. In the same year, Onon was elected the first town clerk, town treasurer, justice of the peace, and superintendent of schools for the newly formed Town of Perry. About the same time Onon was involved in organizing the Norwegian Evangelical Lutheran congregation at Perry.

In 1863 Onon built the house that is the subject of this article, with a T-shaped floor plan. The front of the house is the top of the T, a two-story main block with walls of coursed ashlar limestone blocks fixed with raised mortar joints. Windows are symmetric around the centered front door. At the top of the wall is a broad frieze board, and above that a hip roof. The overall style is Greek Revival, except for fine double brackets under the eaves, which are drawn from Italianate style. Behind the main block the stem of the T is a 1.5-story wing. On each side the roof extends to shelter a veranda. Inside, the house has varnished narrow-board floors and plaster walls and ceilings.

Behind the house is a one-story bank barn which Dahle had built around 1870, with walls of vertical board and batten.

Dahle lived in the house and ran his store until he retired in 1895. Then he moved to Mt. Horeb, where he and Betsy lived until 1905, when they both died. The community where he started his store and lived for many years is now called Daleyville, in his honor.

The Henry L. and Sarah Dahle House and the Herman B. and Anne Marie Dahle House in Mount Horeb also belonged to members of the Dahle family and are listed on the National Register of Historic Places. Onon and Betsy's son, Herman, would become a member of the United States House of Representatives.
