= Military Ridge State Trail =

Multi use trail in Wisconsin

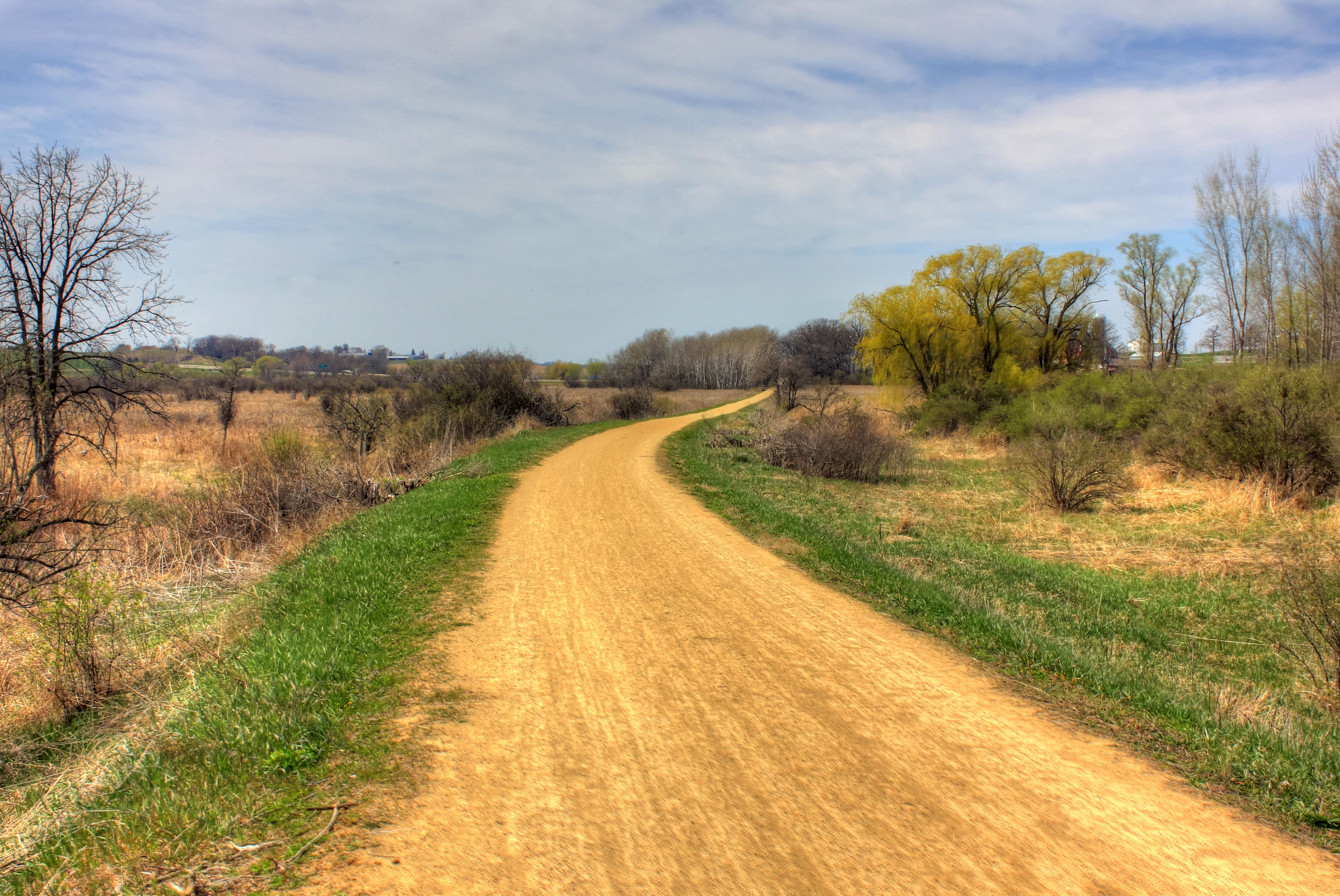
- The trail in 2014
- Length: 40 miles (64 km)
- Location: Wisconsin, United States
- Website: dnr.wisconsin.gov/topic/parks/militaryridge

The Military Ridge State Trail is a 40-mile-long (64 km) recreational rail trail in Wisconsin.

It connects the following communities:

- Dodgeville
- Ridgeway
- Barneveld
- Blue Mounds
- Mount Horeb
- Riley
- Klevenville
- Verona
- Fitchburg

The western end of the trail is on WIS 23 just north of the intersection with King Street in Dodgeville (42°58′34″N 90°07′58″W). The eastern end is at the Southwest Madison Bike Interchange in Arrowhead Park (43°01′26″N 89°27′40″W). The trail largely parallels US Highway 18 (US 18) and US 151 between Dodgeville and Fitchburg.

The crushed limestone-surfaced trail runs along the southern borders of Governor Dodge and Blue Mound state parks. The land around the trail is primarily agricultural, but also includes woods, wetlands, prairies, villages, and small cities.

The limestone-surfaced trail is open to hikers, bicyclists, and wheelchair users in late spring, summer, and fall and snowmobilers and cross-country skiers in the winter. The segment between Verona and Madison is blacktopped and also usable by in-line skaters.

The trail receives its name from Military Ridge Road, built by the US Army in 1835 to connect Green Bay and Fort Crawford (Prairie du Chien) via Fort Winnebago (Portage).

Most of the trail follows the former Chicago and North Western Railway corridor, which has a grade of only 2 to 5 percent. The old railroad line was the same one that crossed the Madison beltline at the surface between Todd Drive and Fish Hatchery Road. Between Dodgeville and Mount Horeb it runs along the top of the Military Ridge, the divide between the Wisconsin River watershed to the north and the Pecatonica and Rock River watershed to the south. Between Mount Horeb and Fitchburg, it goes through the Sugar River Valley.

== See also ==
- List of bike trails in Wisconsin
- List of hiking trails in Wisconsin
- Rail trails
