= Herman B. and Anne Marie Dahle House =

Historic house in Wisconsin, United States

- U.S. National Register of Historic Places
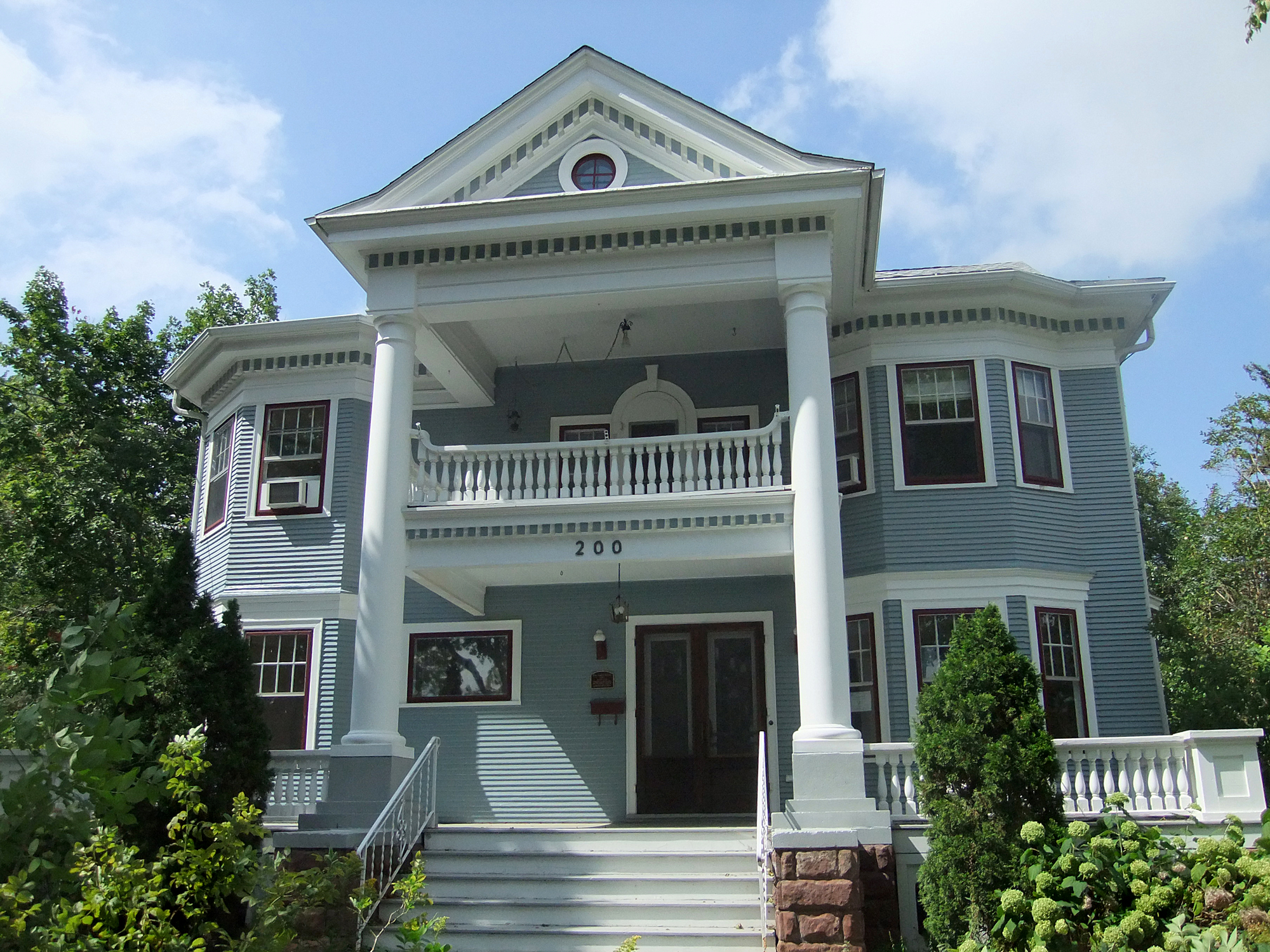
- Herman B. and Anne Marie Dahle House
- Location: 200 N. Second St., Mount Horeb, Wisconsin
- Coordinates: 43°00′39″N 89°44′19″W
- Area: less than one acre
- Built: 1911
- Architect: James O. Gordon
- Architectural style: Classical Revival
- NRHP reference No.: 03001217
- Added to NRHP: November 26, 2003

The Herman B. and Anne Marie Dahle House is a very intact Classical Revival home built in 1911 in Mount Horeb, Wisconsin for one of the city's prominent citizens.

== History ==
Herman Dahle was born in 1855 to Norwegian immigrant Onon Dahle, who had started a pioneer general store two years before in the nearby community that would become Daleyville. Herman worked for his father in the store, then attended the University of Wisconsin, then worked for his father for three more years. In 1877 he married Anne Marie Kittleson and opened his own general store and mill in Mt. Vernon with help from his father. He developed a local business distributing butter and eggs. In 1887 he moved his family and his general store business to Mount Horeb. In 1891 his brother Theodore joined him in the mercantile business and later brother Henry. In the same year Herman, his father and Tom Lingard incorporated the State Bank of Mt. Horeb. In 1898 Herman was elected as a Republican to the U.S. House of Representatives, and served two terms. Meanwhile, Herman served as postmaster, was prominent in Mount Horeb's Lutheran church, and developed some creamery businesses. He was one of Mount Horeb's leading business and civic figures, if not the leader.

In 1910 Herman had the house built that is the subject of this article, two blocks from his store. It is 2.5 stories tall, with a foundation of rock-faced brownstone and the upper parts clad in narrow clapboard. It was designed by James O. Gordon of Madison in Classical Revival style, with the front door framed by two two-story Colossal Doric Order columns. Above that is an entablature and pediment surrounding a bulls-eye window. On each side of the columns is a porch with balustrade. Large 2-story bays flank that. The walls are topped with a denticulated frieze, then broad eaves, then a hip roof, broken by gable-roofed dormers. Inside are floors of varnished oak, pocket doors, an elaborate oak staircase, and the dining room with a plate rail, crown moldings, and a beamed ceiling.

Herman lived in the house until he died in 1920. His wife Anne Marie lived there until 1951.

Later, the house would be used for a number of years as a bed and breakfast. In 2003, it was added to the State and the National Register of Historic Places.

The Henry L. and Sarah Dahle House and the Onon B. and Betsy Dahle House, which also belonged to members of the Dahle family, are also listed on the National Register of Historic Places.
