= Mary Geigus Coulter =

American politician (1859–1946)

Mary Anna Clara Geigus Coulter
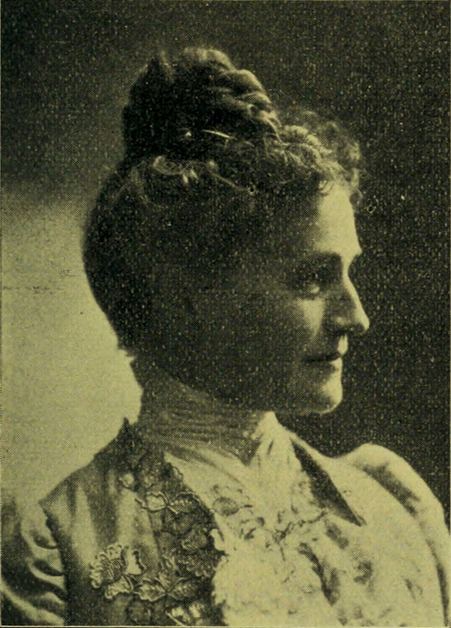
- Mary Geigus Coulter (1904)
- Born: Mary Anna Clara Geigus; September 7, 1859; Savanna, Illinois, U.S.
- Died: July 25, 1946 (aged 86); Ogden, Utah, U.S.
- Other names: Mrs. Chester E. Coulter; Mary G. Coulter
- Education: Northwestern College; University of Michigan Law School
- Occupations: Lawyer, politician
- Known for: In 1904, Mary Geigus Coulter (aka "Mrs Chester E. Coulter") was the only female member of the Utah Legislature.

Mary Anna Clara Coulter (née Mary Anna Clara Geigus) (September 7, 1859 – July 25, 1946) was an American lawyer and politician.

== Early life ==
She was born in Savanna, Illinois, on September 7, 1859, to John Nicholas Geigus and Caroline Christina (née Wasmund) Geigus. Her father was born in Switzerland and her mother was from Mecklenburg, Germany.

Mary graduated from Mt. Carroll High School in 1878 and attended Northwestern College in Naperville, Illinois, until 1880. She then went on to be one of the first women to study in the literary and law departments at the University of Michigan Law School. She graduated from the University of Michigan Law School in 1885 with honors.

== Career ==
The same year of her graduation from law school, she was admitted to the bar in both Illinois and Michigan. However, she stopped practicing law after her marriage that same year.

Mary taught in public schools for four years in both Illinois and Utah. In 1902 she was elected to the House of Representatives of the Utah Legislature. She was the only woman elected in that legislative session (1903-1905) and made history by becoming the first female chairwoman of a state's judiciary committee. During her time in the state legislature, she sponsored and initiated the creation of laws that helped with social conditions in Utah.

After her time in the state legislature, she continued to advocate for women's rights and social reform as a public speaker and through her work with numerous women's clubs, including the Utah Federation of Women's Clubs, Weber County Woman's Rep. Club, and Women Lawyer's Association of New York City. She served as president for many of these clubs, including the Utah Federation of Women's Clubs. She also served as vice president for Utah of the Woman Lawyers Association for ten years. Mary was also elected twice to the Republican State Convention in Utah.

== Personal life ==
In 1885, Mary was married to Dr. Chester Emory Coulter, a physician and a surgeon. After their marriage, the couple moved to Los Angeles, California, for a year and then relocated to Ogden, Utah. Together, they were the parents of Halvor Geigus Coulter, who graduated from West Point and later become a Lt. at the age of 22, one of the youngest officers in U.S. Army history. He was given military decorations by the French government for his services in World War I.

Dr. Coulter died on September 12, 1915. Mary died on July 25, 1946, at Ogden Hospital in Ogden, Utah.
