= Henry L. and Sarah Dahle House =

Historic house in Wisconsin, United States

- U.S. National Register of Historic Places
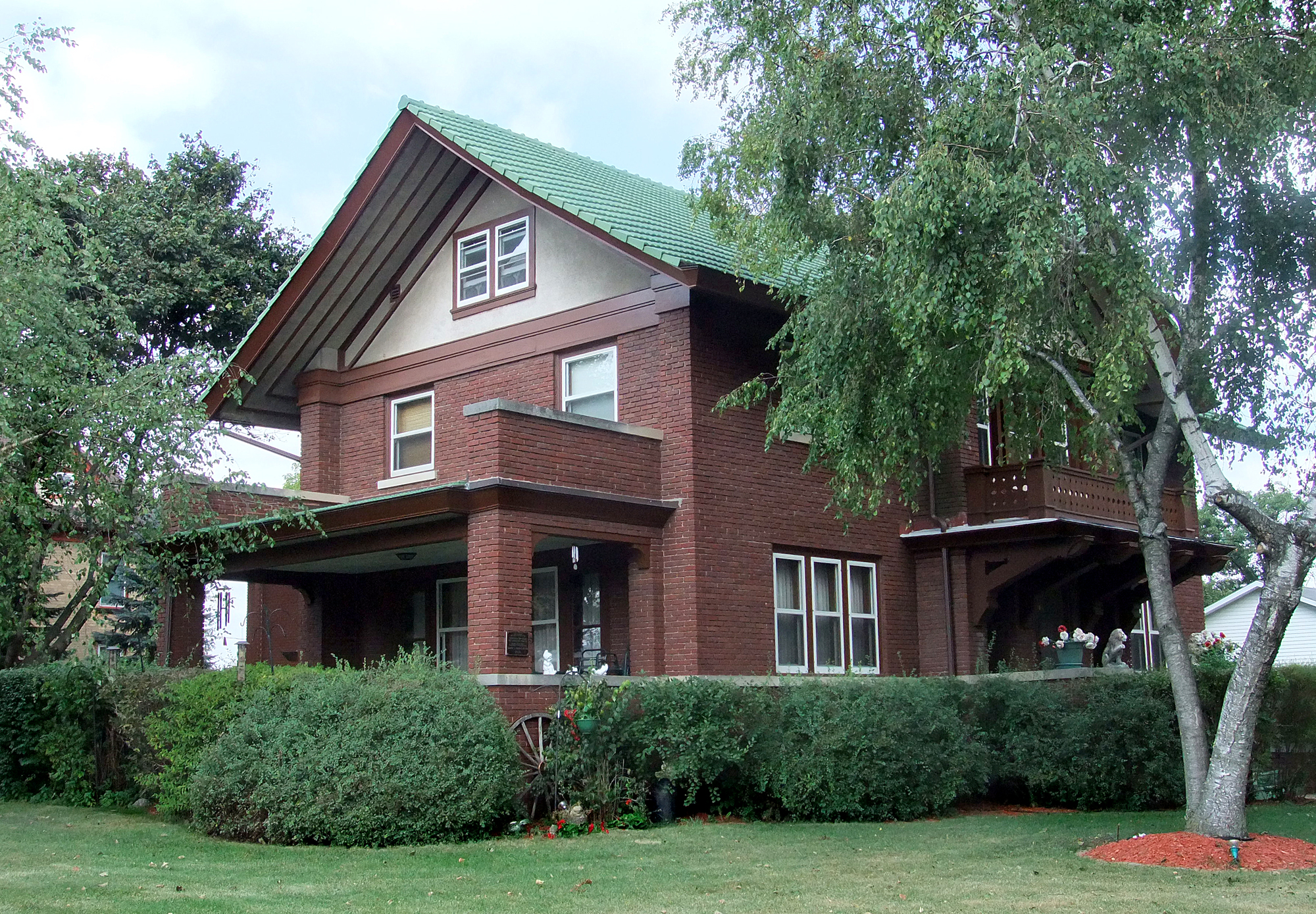
- Henry L. and Sarah Dahle House
- Location: 312 S. Fourth St., Mount Horeb, Wisconsin
- Coordinates: 43°00′16″N 89°44′07″W
- Area: less than one acre
- Built: 1916
- Architect: Claude & Starck
- Architectural style: Prairie School
- NRHP reference No.: 03001218
- Added to NRHP: November 26, 2003

The Henry L. and Sarah Dahle House is located in Mount Horeb, Wisconsin.

== History ==
Henry L. Dahle was a member of a prominent family. His brother, Herman Dahle, would become a member of the United States House of Representatives. Dahle died before the house was completed, but his widow, Sarah, would go on to reside in it and the house remained in the family until the 1990s. In 2003, it was added to the State and the National Register of Historic Places.

The Herman B. and Anne Marie Dahle House and the Onon B. and Betsy Dahle House, which also belonged to members of the Dahle family, are also listed on the National Register of Historic Places.
