= John Loeb =

John Loeb may refer to:

- John Langeloth Loeb Jr., American businessman and ambassador
- John Langeloth Loeb Sr., American investor and executive
- John Jacob Loeb, American composer

== See also ==
- John Loebs, member of the Wisconsin State Assembly
