= Forward, Wisconsin =

- Unincorporated community
- Location within Wisconsin Location within the United States
- Coordinates: 42°53′49″N 89°45′22″W
- Country: United States
- State: Wisconsin
- County: Dane County
- Town: Perry
- Elevation: 981 ft (299 m)
- Time zone: UTC-6 (Central (CST))
  - Summer (DST): UTC-5 (CDT)
- Area code: 608
- GNIS feature ID: 1577603

Forward is an unincorporated community in the town of Perry, Dane County, Wisconsin, United States.

The area is named after the state motto of Wisconsin.
