= Gulbrand and Bertha Jensvold House =

Historic house in Wisconsin, United States

- U.S. National Register of Historic Places
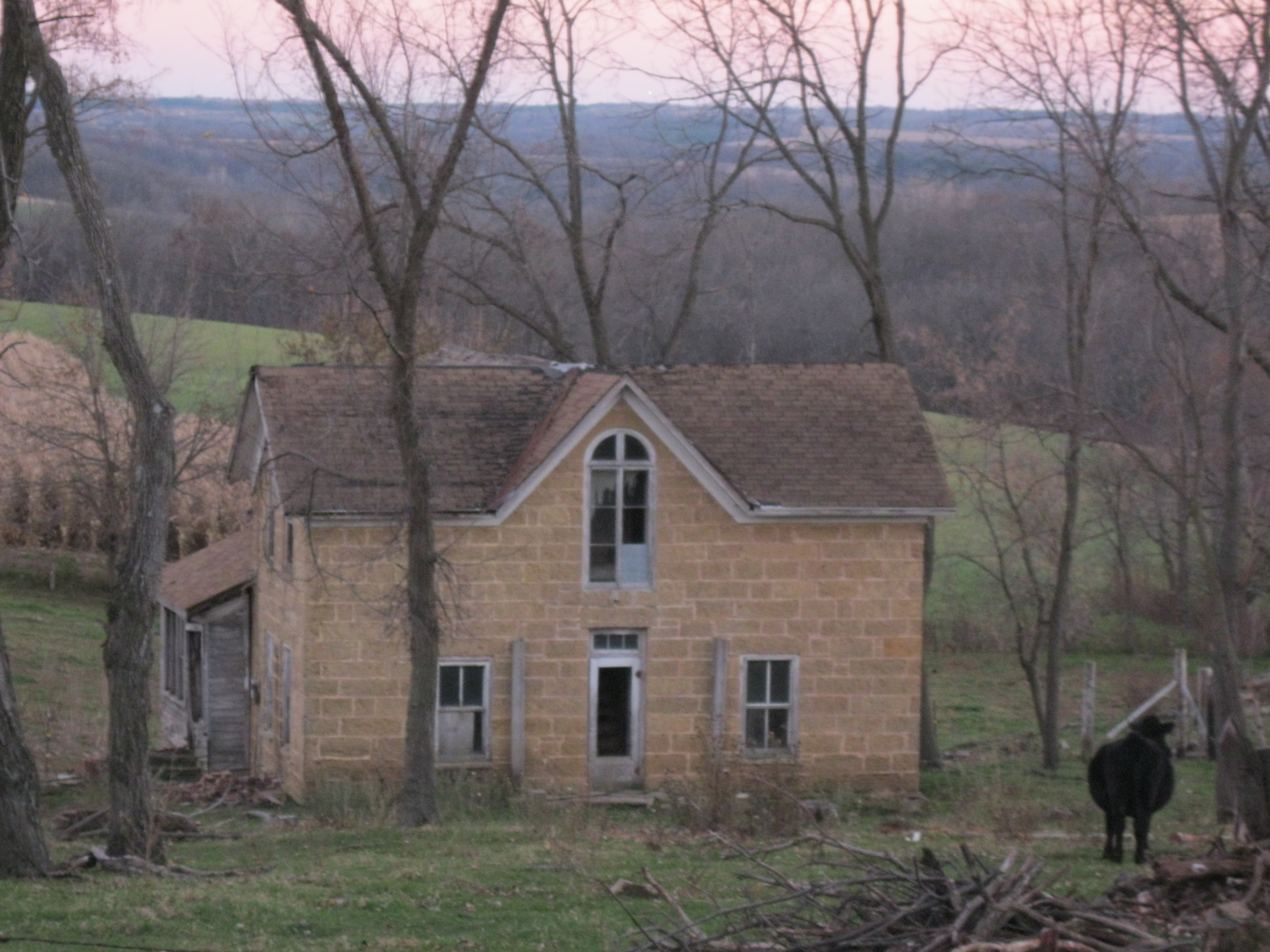
- Gulbrand and Bertha Jensvold House
- Location: 1033 WI 78, Perry, Wisconsin
- Coordinates: 42°54′44″N 89°49′01″W
- Area: 1.9 acres (0.77 ha)
- Architectural style: Mid 19th Century Revival
- NRHP reference No.: 08000370
- Added to NRHP: April 30, 2008

The Gulbrand and Bertha Jensvold House is a historic farmhouse built in 1868–69 in Perry, Wisconsin. It was added to the State Register of Historic Places in 2007 and to the National Register of Historic Places the following year.

== History ==
Gulbrand Jensvold was born in Norway in 1841, and trained there as a schoolteacher. In 1866 he arrived in the Norwegian-American community at Daleyville and was hired to teach at the parochial school attached to the Perry Lutheran Church. In addition to teaching, he served as "klokker," a sort of pastor's assistant who led prayers and singing at worship, rang the church bell, and performed other duties.

In 1868, Gulbrand married Bertha Gaarder, another recent immigrant from Norway, and they bought an 80-acre farm. In the following year they took a $700 mortgage on the farm to build a new house, right across the road from the church.

The house is two stories, with walls of coursed ashlar limestone blocks with raised mortar joints. The walls are topped with a frieze board under the eaves, then a gable roof. The main block can be classed an I-house, one room deep with the front door leading to a hall with one room on each side. The front of the house is symmetric with the door in the center, a window on each side, and a large round-topped window in the gable directly above the door. That prominent window can be interpreted as a lunette-shaped transom over a rectangular window, or as a Christian cross facing the klokker's church. The opening may also have once held a French door which opened onto a balcony above the flat-topped porch which once sheltered the front door. The relatively steep gable around the upper window seems to come from Gothic Revival style. Behind the front block a kitchen wing reaches south, with porches on each side.

By 1878 Gulbrand and Bertha had five children. In that year, a deadly tornado passed through the community, tearing the roof off the Jensvold house and damaging the stone walls. It also destroyed the farm buildings and killed some livestock. It killed five people around Daleyville, but the Jensvolds were safe and they rebuilt.

Gulbrand died in 1882. Bertha and the children lived in the house until 1903, when Halver Anderson bought the farm. The house was occupied until the 1960s, then stood empty and largely unmaintained until it was nominated to the NRHP in 2008.
