= Fred Haefliger =

Fred Haefliger (October 23, 1892 – January 7, 1988) served in the United States Marine Corps during World War I. He received the Distinguished Service Cross and Navy Cross.

Haefliger was born in Mount Vernon, Wisconsin. After serving in the U.S. Marine Corps in the First World War, he married Dena Johnson (1891–1986) in 1920. He farmed in Clinton, Wisconsin from 1930 to 1982. He died in Barron, Wisconsin.

== Awards ==
Haefliger was awarded the Distinguished Service Cross, the Navy Cross, and the Silver Star Citation for bravery near Saint-Étienne, France on October 3, 1918.

His Distinguished Service Cross citation reads:

The President of the United States of America, authorized by Act of Congress, July 9, 1918, takes pleasure in presenting the Distinguished Service Cross to Private Fred Haefliger (MCSN: 92778), United States Marine Corps, for extraordinary heroism while serving with the Seventy-Seventh Company, Sixth Machine-Gun Battalion, Sixth Regiment (Marines), 2d Division, A.E.F., in action near St. Etienne, France, 3 October 1918. When our advanced infantry was forced to withdraw, Private Haefliger's machine-gun crew refused to withdraw, but calmly set up their machine-gun. The gun was upset by a bursting hand grenade, which also injured Private Haefliger and another member of the squad. Despite their injuries, they immediately reset the gun and opened fire on the advancing Germans when twenty feet distant, causing the Germans to break and retreat in disorder.

His Navy Cross citation reads:

The President of the United States of America takes pleasure in presenting the Navy Cross to Private Fred Haefliger (MCSN: 92778), United States Marine Corps, for extraordinary heroism while serving with the 77th Company, 6th Machine-Gun Battalion, 6th Regiment (Marines), 2d Division, A.E.F. in action near St. Etienne, France, 3 October 1918. When our advanced infantry was forced to withdraw, Private Haefliger's machine-gun crew refused to withdraw, but calmly set up their machine-gun. The gun was upset by a bursting hand grenade, which also injured Private Haefliger and another member of the squad. Despite their injuries, they immediately reset the gun and opened fire on the advancing Germans when twenty feet distant, causing the Germans to break and retreat in disorder.
