= Riley, Wisconsin =

- Unincorporated community
- Location within Wisconsin Location within the United States
- Coordinates: 43°01′24″N 89°37′21″W
- Country: United States
- State: Wisconsin
- County: Dane County
- Town: Springdale
- Elevation: 961 ft (293 m)
- Time zone: UTC-6 (Central (CST))
  - Summer (DST): UTC-5 (CDT)
- Area code: 608
- GNIS feature ID: 1572314

Riley is an unincorporated community located in the town of Springdale, Dane County, Wisconsin, United States.

== History ==
A post office called Riley was established in 1882, and remained in operation until it was discontinued in 1940. The community was named for the Riley brothers, land owners.
