= Thomas A. Stewart (politician) =

American politician

Thomas W. Stewart
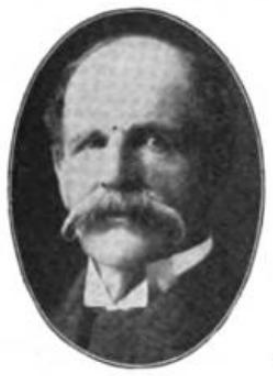

Member of the Wisconsin State Assembly
- Constituency: Dane County Third District
- In office 1906–1916

Personal details
- Born: March 2, 1848 Verona, Wisconsin
- Died: April 22, 1920 (aged 71) Verona, Wisconsin
- Party: Democratic
- Education: Northwestern Business College; University of Wisconsin
- Occupation: Farmer, politician

Thomas A. Stewart (March 2, 1848 – April 22, 1920) was an American farmer and politician.

== Biography ==
Born in Verona, Wisconsin, Stewart studied at the Northwestern Business College and University of Wisconsin. He was a farmer and stock raiser, and he married Jessie Rutherford (1850–1913) of Verona. He served on the Dane County Board of Supervisors and in local government. He served in the Wisconsin State Assembly from 1907 to 1911 and again from 1913 to 1915 as a Democrat. He died in Verona, Wisconsin.
