= John Loebs =

American politician (1853–c.1930)

John Loebs (September 10, 1853 – after 1930) was an American politician. He was a member of the Wisconsin State Assembly.

== Biography ==
Loebs was born on September 10, 1853, in Sherman, Sheboygan County, Wisconsin, the son of Lewis Loebs and Christina Elizabeth née Saeman. He attended Northwestern College before moving to Campbellsport, Wisconsin, where he was an officer for the First National Bank of Campbellsport. He married Ella Mary Denniston in 1880. Together with William Knickel, John Loebs operated the former Saeman store in Campbellsport until it was destroyed by a fire in 1908.

== Career ==
Loebs was elected to the Assembly in 1902. He was a Republican.

== See also ==
- The Political Graveyard
