= Daleyville, Wisconsin =

- Unincorporated community
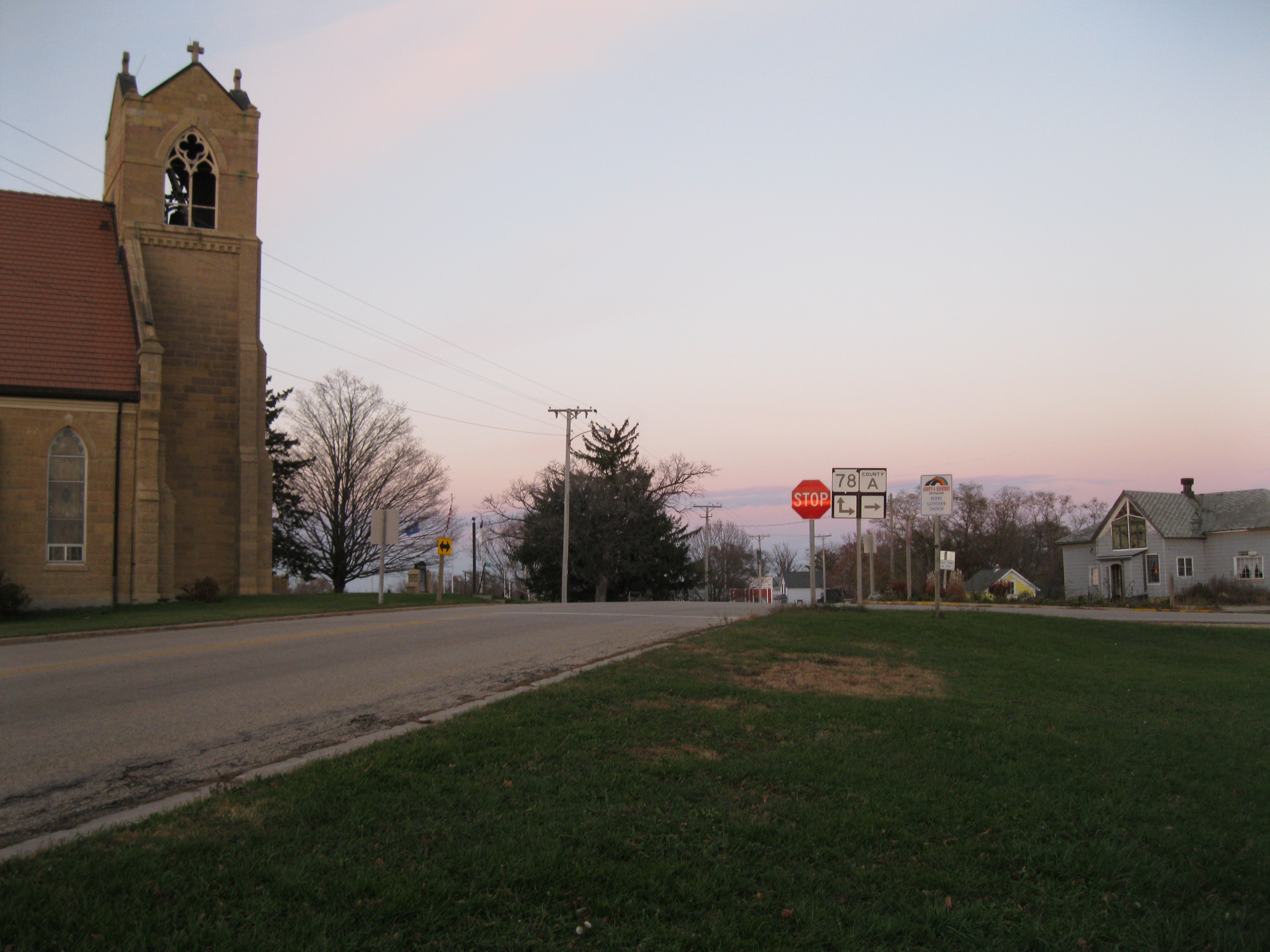
- Intersection of Wisconsin Highway 78 and County Highway A in Daleyville

- Location within Wisconsin Location within the United States
- Coordinates: 42°54′54″N 89°48′53″W
- Country: United States
- State: Wisconsin
- County: Dane County
- Town: Perry
- Elevation: 1,135 ft (346 m)
- Time zone: UTC-6 (Central (CST))
  - Summer (DST): UTC-5 (CDT)
- Area code: 608
- GNIS feature ID: 1563674

Daleyville is an unincorporated community located in the town of Perry, Dane County, Wisconsin, United States.

== History ==
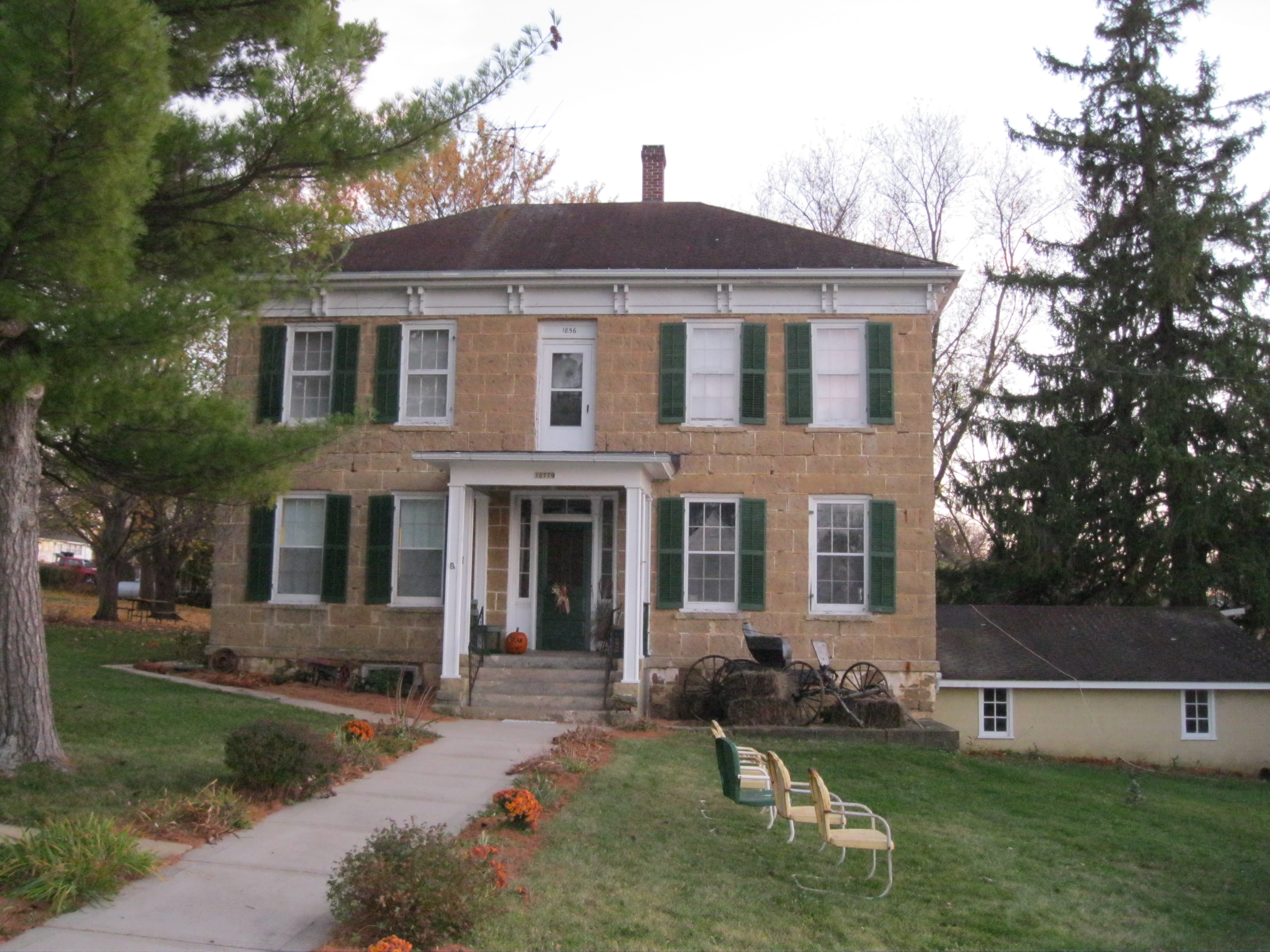
1864 Onon and Betsy Dahle house

The small village got its name from Onon B. Dahle, who opened a store there in 1853. In early history the community's name was spelled “Dahleville.” Daleyville once had two blacksmith shops, a wagon shop, a post office, a shoe shop, a garage and general store, a physician and a surgeon, a telephone exchange, and a school. The Onon B. and Betsy Dahle House still stands just off Highway 78 and is on the National Register of Historic Places.

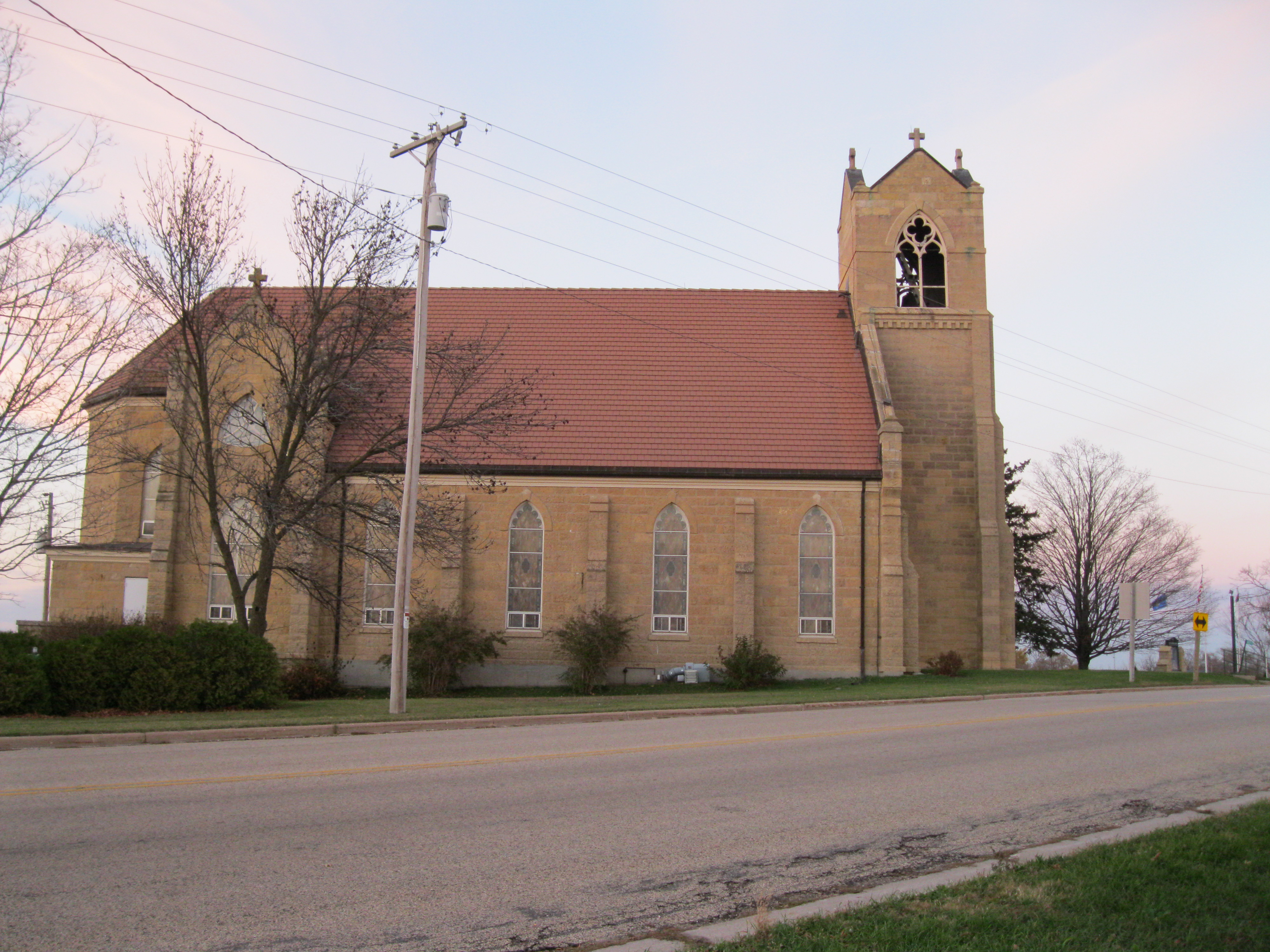
Perry Lutheran Church

== Notable people ==
- Herman Dahle, member of the United States House of Representatives from Wisconsin
