= Klevenville, Wisconsin =

Unincorporated community in Wisconsin, United States

- Unincorporated community
- Location within Wisconsin Location within the United States
- Coordinates: 43°01′28″N 89°40′04″W
- Country: United States
- State: Wisconsin
- County: Dane County
- Town: Springdale
- Elevation: 988 ft (301 m)
- Time zone: UTC-6 (Central (CST))
  - Summer (DST): UTC-5 (CDT)
- Area code: 608
- GNIS feature ID: 1567547

Klevenville is an unincorporated community located in the town of Springdale, Dane County, Wisconsin, United States.

== History ==
A post office called Klevenville was established in 1891, and remained in operation until it was discontinued in 1952. The community was named for Iver Kleven, a pioneer settler.
