= Military Ridge Road =

Coordinates: 43°43′49″N 88°43′49″W

- Raube Road Site
- U.S. National Register of Historic Places
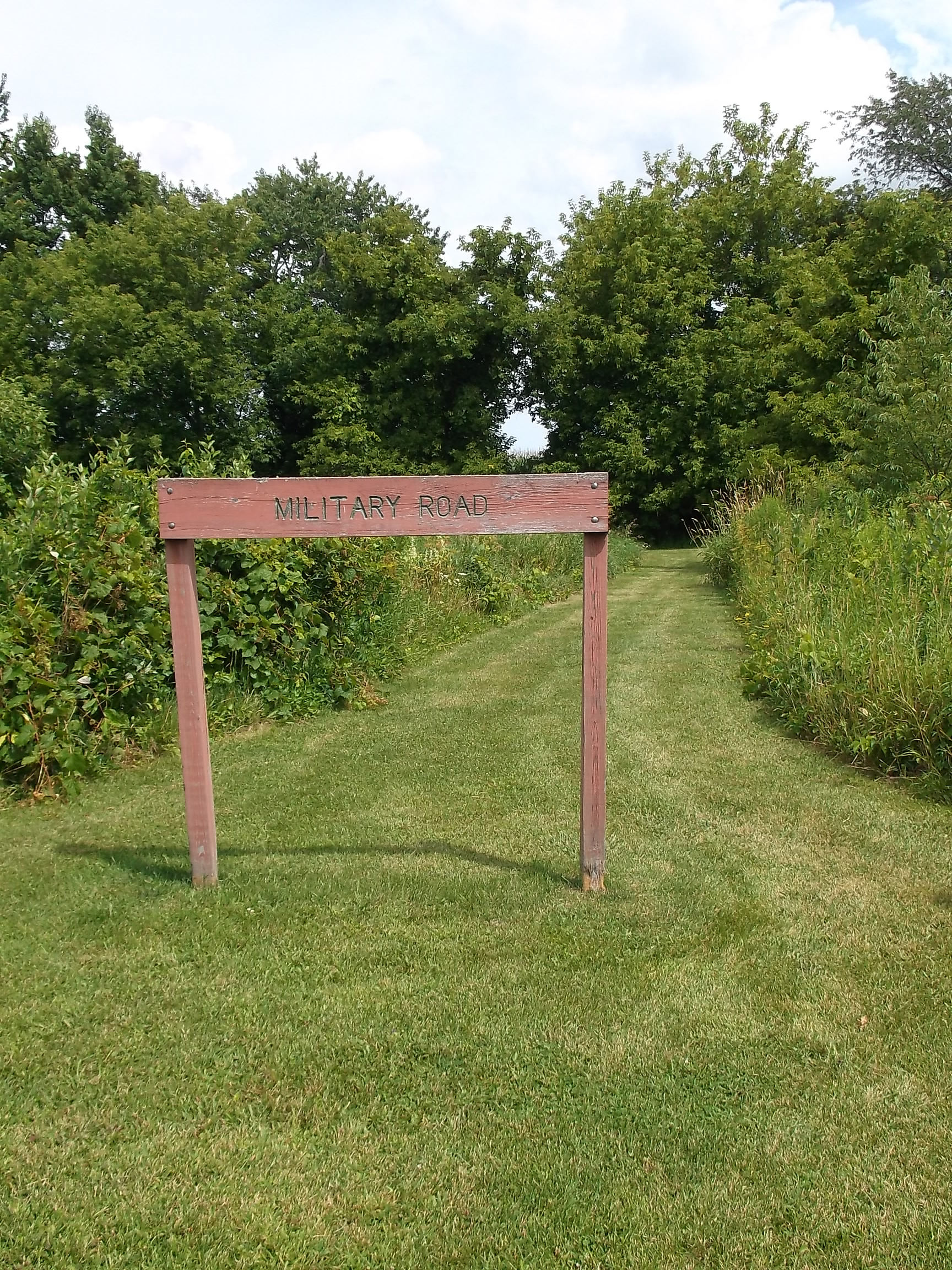
- Raube Road, a preserved segment of the first Wisconsin military road, constructed in the 1830s
- Location: Wisconsin, United States
- Built: 1835
- NRHP reference No.: 92000589
- Added to NRHP: June 4, 1992

The Old Military Road was a road built by the U.S. Army in 1835–36, connecting Fort Howard (Green Bay) Wisconsin with Fort Crawford (Prairie du Chien) via Fond du Lac, Fort Winnebago (Portage), and Dodgeville. This first military road was a beginning of government planning for overland travel, which eventually led Wisconsin, first as a territory and later as a state, and its localities to finance its own system of roadways for various purposes. Remains of the road that exist today are listed on the National Register of Historic Places.

== Financing and construction ==
Financed by Congressional action in 1832 and constructed between 1835 and 1837, the first military road in Wisconsin Territory connected three forts. From Fort Howard near Green Bay, the road extended south along the eastern shore of Lake Winnebago and then headed southwest toward Fort Winnebago (near present-day Portage along the Wisconsin River). From Fort Winnebago, the road looped further southwest toward Fort Crawford on the Mississippi River (near present-day Prairie du Chien).

The road was underwater at times during wet seasons, and foot-high stumps in the road complicated travel. The 1973 work The History of Wisconsin described the road as "little more than a lane through the timber and a pathway over the prairie, with streams bridged and swamps ditched, the road was crude and often impassable; but it nevertheless filled the important objective of traversing Wisconsin from east to west". Maintenance by settlers attracted to the area kept the road passable. The cost for initial construction and maintenance for the 234-mile (377 km) road was $12,000.

== Remains of the road ==
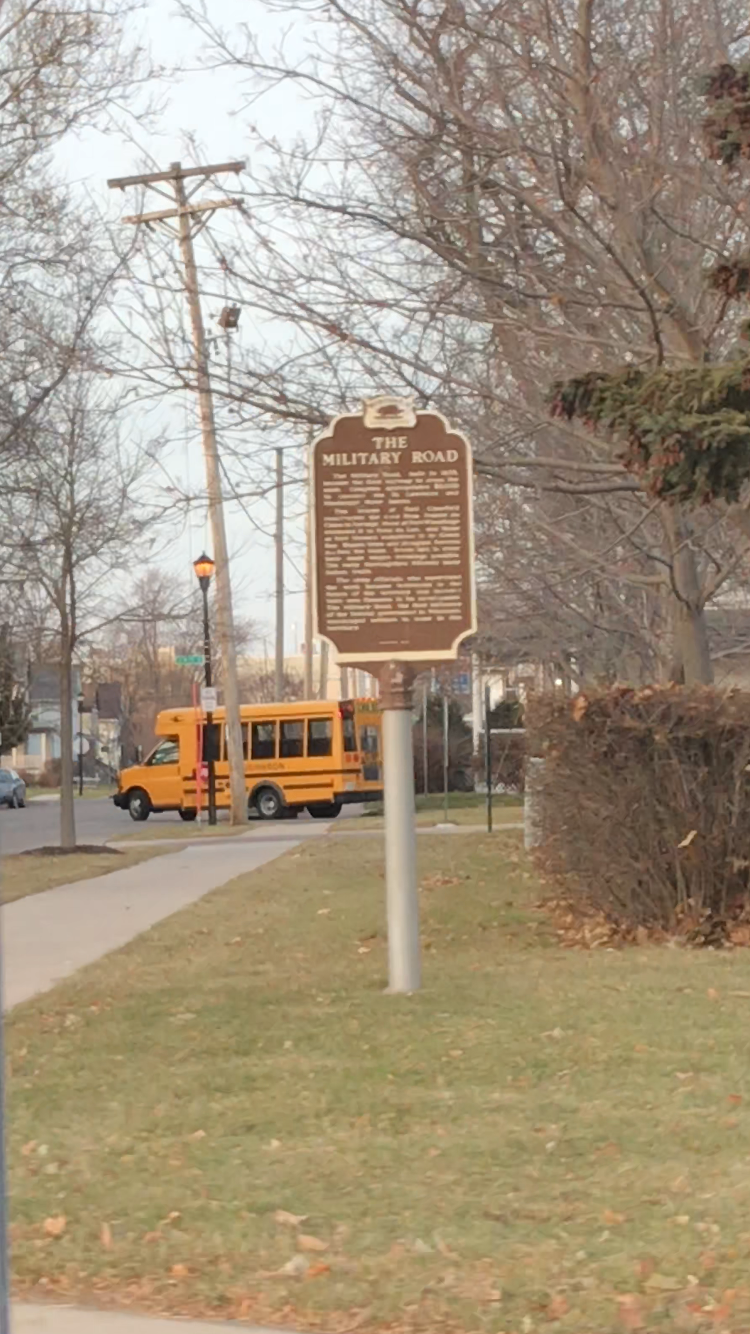
The Military Road marker in Fond du Lac.

Its modern descendant follows the route from Green Bay to Fond du Lac along Wisconsin Highway 55 and U.S. Highway 151, then west on Wisconsin State Highways 68 and 33 to Portage, where it travels west via U.S. Highway 18. The name survives as one for local streets paralleling the current highways. Military Ridge State Trail runs over a portion of its alignment. An actual 123-foot (37 m) segment of the road in its original state is also preserved in Fond du Lac County, It is located on farmland purchased by Albert and Martha Raube in 1911; Raube Road was listed in National Register of Historic Places in 1992. Other present-day reminders of the road's legacy include Military Avenue in Green Bay and Military Road in Fond du Lac. Wisconsin Highway 55 east of Lake Winnebago is also called Military Road in some of the communities it passes through.
