= Herman Dahle =

American politician (1855–1920)

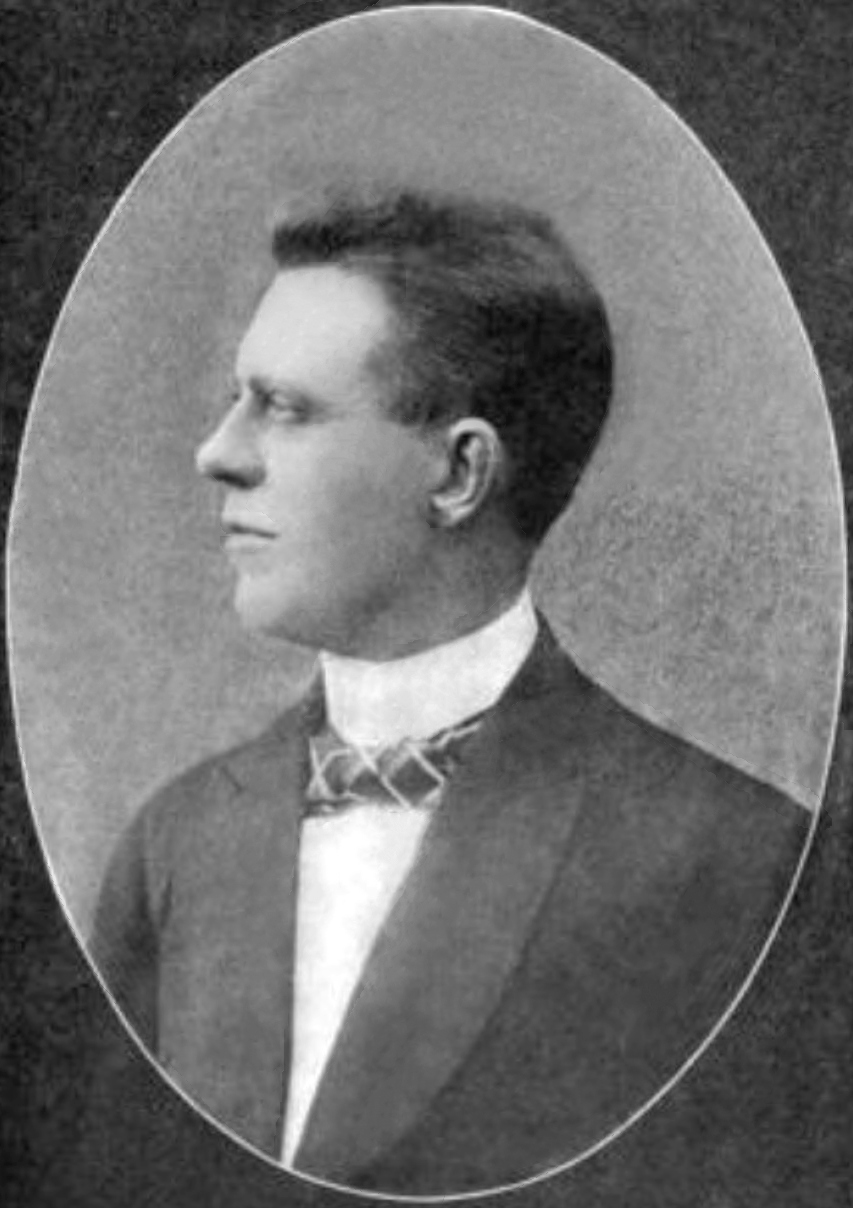

Member of the U.S. House of Representatives from Wisconsin's 2nd district
- In office March 4, 1899 – March 3, 1903
- Preceded by: Edward Sauerhering
- Succeeded by: Henry Cullen Adams

Personal details
- Born: March 30, 1855 Perry, Wisconsin, U.S.
- Died: April 25, 1920 (aged 65) Mount Horeb, Wisconsin, U.S.
- Resting place: Mount Horeb Union Cemetery
- Party: Republican
- Spouse: Anne Marie Kittleson
- Children: 7

Herman Bjorn Dahle (March 30, 1855 – April 25, 1920) was an American businessman and Republican politician from Dane County, Wisconsin. He served two terms in the U.S. House of Representatives, representing Wisconsin's 2nd congressional district for the 56th and 57th congresses (1899–1903).

His former home in Mount Horeb, Wisconsin, is listed as the Herman B. and Anne Marie Dahle House in the National Register of Historic Places.

== Background ==
Herman Bjorn Dahle was born in the town of Perry, Dane County, Wisconsin. He received his education in the district schools of his native town, then received a collegiate education at the University of Wisconsin, where he graduated in 1877. He resided at Mount Vernon, Wisconsin from 1877 to 1888 where he conducted a general mercantile business. He was also the principal owner of the Mount Horeb bank beginning in 1890.

His former home, now known as the Herman B. and Anne Marie Dahle House, is listed on the National Register of Historic Places.

== Political career ==
Dahle was elected as a Republican for Wisconsin's 2nd congressional district for the Fifty-sixth and Fifty-seventh Congresses (March 4, 1899 – March 3, 1903), but was an unsuccessful candidate for renomination in 1902.

== Later career and death ==
He resumed mercantile pursuits and banking in Mount Horeb, Wisconsin, where he died in 1920. He left behind an estate worth $280,000. Dahle was buried in Mount Horeb Union Cemetery.

== Other sources ==
- Keyes, Elisha W. History of Dane County. Biographical And Genealogical (Madison, Wisconsin: Western Historical Association, 1906)

U.S. House of Representatives
Preceded by Edward Sauerhering	Member of the U.S. House of Representatives from Wisconsin's 2nd congressional district 1899-1903	Succeeded by Henry Cullen Adams
