= Mount Vernon, Wisconsin =

- Unincorporated community
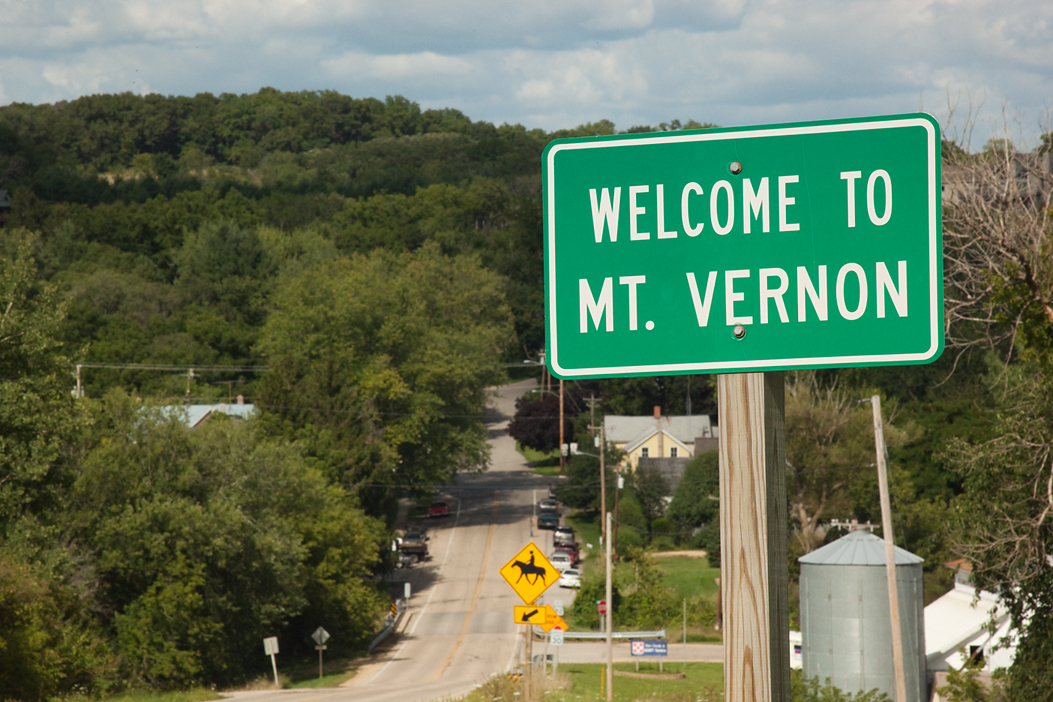
- Main street in Mount Vernon

- Location within Wisconsin Location within the United States
- Coordinates: 42°56′49″N 89°39′21″W
- Country: United States
- State: Wisconsin
- County: Dane County
- Elevation: 925 ft (282 m)
- Time zone: UTC-6 (Central (CST))
  - Summer (DST): UTC-5 (CDT)
- Area code: 608
- GNIS feature ID: 1569853

Mount Vernon is an unincorporated community in the town of Springdale, Dane County, Wisconsin, United States.

== History ==
The "Big Spring" on the Mount Vernon Creek branch of the Sugar River is located in what is now Donald Park. The "Big Spring" has been known since at least the 1800s and is one of the features that made Mount Vernon an attractive place for settlement. A cabin built near the "Big Spring" is currently the subject of an archaeological dig and dates from the 1840s. The cabin is believed to be the home of the George Patchin family who were the first Western settlers in the area after migrating from Ohio in 1846.

In 1847, the Britts family acquired 200 acres of land in the area and built a mill on the river. Having migrated from Virginia, the Britt family named their settlement Mount Vernon after Mount Vernon, Virginia. The village was platted in 1850. By 1852, there were 12 families living in Mount Vernon. The Hotel De Allen, which had a saloon and a stable, was built on the West side of the river.

In 1858, a grist mill was built on the river. Farmers from the region brought grain into town to have it milled and bought supplies from the general store. Men hauling lead from Western Wisconsin to Milwaukee often stayed in town as well.

In 1852, much of the Britts land and additional adjoining lands were acquired by Dr. Philander Byam and his two brothers, and Byam's Addition to Mount Vernon was platted. The Byams came to be infamous for their fraudulent business dealings. They sold to local farmers worthless "patent rights." They also sold village lots for exorbitant prices to buyers in New York State using false and misleading sales materials. In one example, they showed a picture of Mount Vernon with a large settlement and a steamboat on the Sugar River. The river is actually only 15–20 feet wide and 1–2 feet deep in most areas.

On October 24, 1859, a group of approximately 70 residents held a meeting, and the group proceeded to Dr. Byam's residence to request his attendance at the meeting. Dr. Byam's wife falsely claimed that he was not at home, so the citizens began to tear down Dr. Byam's house until he eventually came outside. The group proceeded to the mill where a trial was held. The verdict was that the Byams were given the option to leave within 24 hours or to stay and be hanged. One of the Byam brothers was tarred and feathered. The Byams left town the next morning, but one of the brothers returned the next day for a load of hay. The townspeople spotted him and burned the hay wagon.

By 1880, the village had over 100 residents. Local businesses included two hotels with saloons, a leather goods and tanning shop, the general store, a shoe shop, a blacksmith shop, and a slaughter house.

Today, the community consists of several homes and small businesses, a church, and a small park.

== Geography ==
Mount Vernon is located 7 miles (11 km) south of Mount Horeb and 18 miles (29 km) southwest of Madison, at the intersection of County Highway G and Wisconsin Highway 92. It occupies land on the eastern edge of Wisconsin's Driftless Area, and is bordered on two sides by Donald Park, a 480-acre (1.9 km^{2}) county park at the headwaters of the Sugar River.

== Notable people ==
- Emma Amelia Cranmer, temperance reformer, woman suffragist, writer
- Herman Dahle - U.S. Representative
- John Donald - Wisconsin politician and dentist
- Fred Haefliger - highly decorated U.S. Marine
