= Springdale, Wisconsin =

Town in Wisconsin, US

- Town
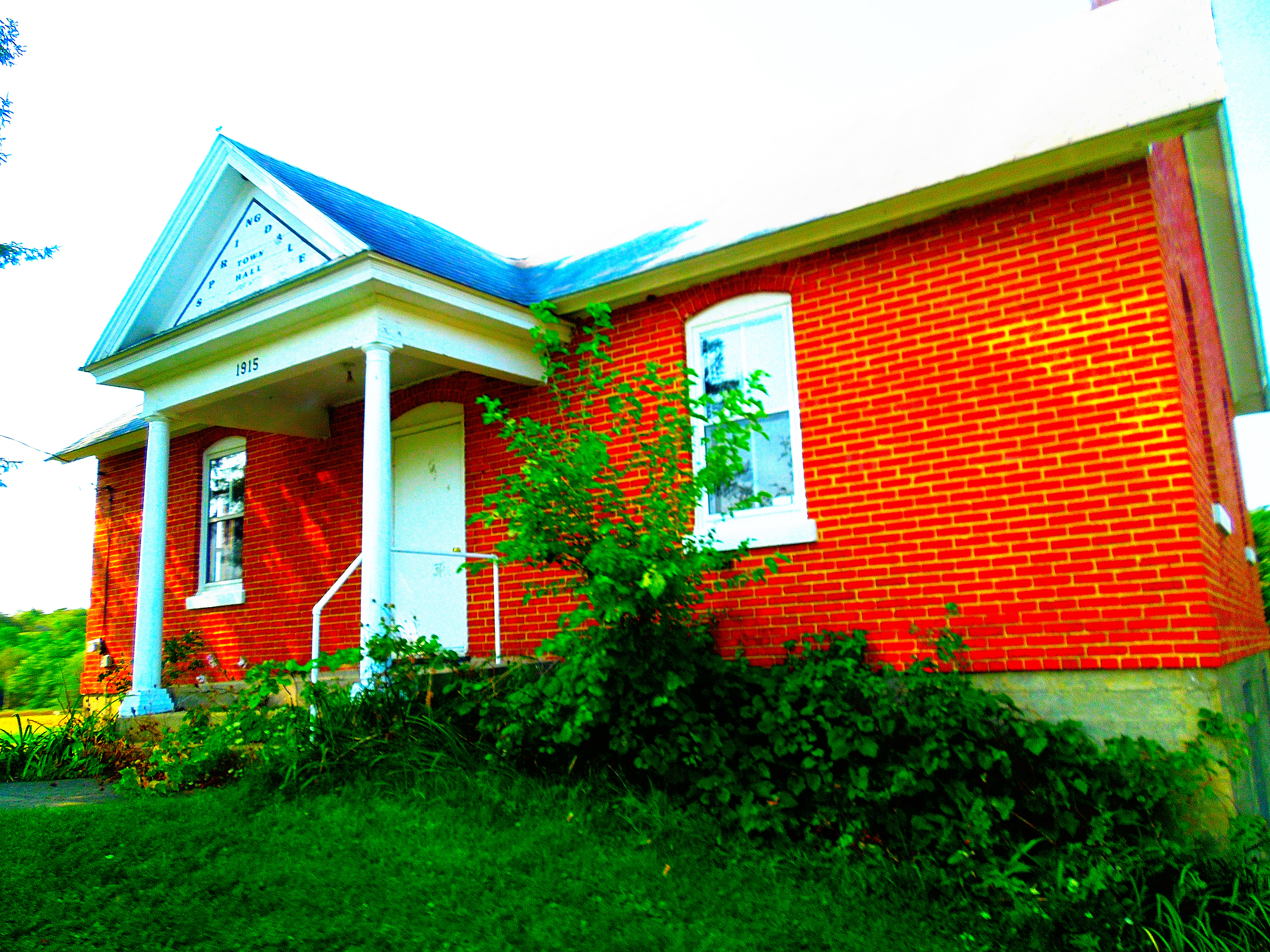
- Town hall

- Location in Dane County and the state of Wisconsin.
- Coordinates: 42°58′38″N 89°39′4″W
- Country: United States
- State: Wisconsin
- County: Dane

Area
  - Total: 35.3 sq mi (91.4 km^{2})
  - Land: 35.3 sq mi (91.4 km^{2})
  - Water: 0 sq mi (0.0 km^{2})
- Elevation: 1,152 ft (351 m)

Population (2020)
  - Total: 2,056
  - Density: 43/sq mi (16.7/km^{2})
- Time zone: UTC-6 (Central (CST))
  - Summer (DST): UTC-5 (CDT)
- Area code: 608
- FIPS code: 55-75850
- GNIS feature ID: 1584191
- Website: https://springdalewi.gov/

Springdale is a town in Dane County, Wisconsin, United States. The population was 2,056 at the 2020 census. The unincorporated communities of Klevenville, Mount Vernon, and Riley are located in the town.

== Geography ==
According to the United States Census Bureau, the town has a total area of 35.3 square miles (91.4 km^{2}), all land.

== History ==
The land that would become Springdale was first surveyed in 1832 and 1833. Settlement began around 1845, aided by good access via the Military Road. The Town of Springdale itself was established in 1848. The town was largely settled by the mid-1850s, filled with Americans from the Northeast and Midwest along with immigrants from England, Scotland, Ireland, Germany and Norway.

== Demographics ==
At the 2000 census, there were 1,530 people, 570 households, and 441 families in the town. The population density was 43.4 people per square mile (16.7/km^{2}). There were 585 housing units at an average density of 16.6 per square mile (6.4/km^{2}). The racial makeup of the town was 96.99% White, 0.65% African American, 0.13% Native American, 0.39% Asian, 0.13% Pacific Islander, 0.39% from other races, and 1.31% from two or more races. Hispanic or Latino of any race were 1.31%.

Of the 570 households 35.6% had children under the age of 18 living with them, 70.2% were married couples living together, 4.9% had a female householder with no husband present, and 22.6% were non-families. 15.8% of households were one person and 3.7% were one person aged 65 or older. The average household size was 2.68 and the average family size was 3.03.

The age distribution was 27.1% under the age of 18, 4.4% from 18 to 24, 30.7% from 25 to 44, 28.2% from 45 to 64, and 9.6% 65 or older. The median age was 40 years. For every 100 females, there were 104.8 males. For every 100 females age 18 and over, there were 103.1 males.

The median household income was $65,655 and the median family income was $68,417. Males had a median income of $40,231 versus $31,467 for females. The per capita income for the town was $27,138. About 1.8% of families and 1.9% of the population were below the poverty line, including 3.3% of those under age 18 and 2.1% of those age 65 or over.

== Municipal services ==
Sewer, water, and natural gas utilities are not available within the town. Law enforcement services are provided by the Dane County Sheriff's Department. Fire and emergency medical services are provided by the Mount Horeb Area Joint Fire Department and Emergency Medical Service.
