= Northwestern College (Illinois) =

For-profit institution of higher education in Illinois

Coordinates: 41°45′6.0″N 87°47′50.1″W

Northwestern College (NC), formerly Northwestern Business College, was a private for-profit college from 1902 to 2024 in Oak Lawn, Illinois, United States. The Illinois Board of Higher Education serves as the custodian of records for the college following the its closure.

The school offered a bachelor's degree program, associate degree programs, and certificate programs in online and on-campus settings. The college closed in July 2024 after several years of financial challenges.

== History ==
The college was founded in 1902. Northwestern College was accredited by the Higher Learning Commission and approved by the Illinois Board of Higher Education. It was located in Bridgeview and then moved to 9400 South Cicero Avenue in August 2022.

From June 2020 to December 2021, the U.S. Department of Education placed Northwestern College on a Heightened Cash Monitoring Level 1 and Heightened Cash Monitoring Level 2 from March 2022 until its closure.

On July 2, 2024, the Higher Learning Commission placed the college "On Notice" because it was at risk of being out of compliance with the Criteria for Accreditation, with a follow-up visit scheduled for no later that December 2025. It abruptly closed days later on Saturday July 6, 2024. Although college officials told students that they had secured transfer agreements with several local colleges and universities, students and local reporters quickly discovered that those officials had lied and there were no such agreements.

The Illinois Board of Higher Education serves as the custodian of records for the college following the its closure.

== Health science accreditations ==
The Health Information Technology Associate in Applied Science Degree program and the Bachelor of Science degree in Health Information Management programs were accredited by the Commission on Accreditation for Health Informatics and Information Management Education. The Radiologic Technology Associate in Applied Science Degree program was accredited by the Joint Review Committee on Education in Radiologic Technology.

The Associate in Applied Science Degree program in Nursing was approved by the Illinois Department of Financial and Professional Regulation, Division of Professional Regulation, Illinois State Board of Nursing. When the college closed, this program was on probation due to low first-time pass rates of the National Council Licensure Examination.

== Alumni ==
- John Wayne Gacy (1963), serial killer
- Ernst J. Hoesly, businessman and politician
- John Loebs, politician
