= Perry, Wisconsin =

- Town
- Location in Dane County and the state of Wisconsin.
- Coordinates: 42°53′27″N 89°47′38″W
- Country: United States
- State: Wisconsin
- County: Dane

Area
  - Total: 36.1 sq mi (93.6 km^{2})
  - Land: 36.1 sq mi (93.6 km^{2})
  - Water: 0 sq mi (0.0 km^{2})
- Elevation: 928 ft (283 m)

Population (2020)
  - Total: 737
  - Density: 20.4/sq mi (7.87/km^{2})
- Time zone: UTC-6 (Central (CST))
  - Summer (DST): UTC-5 (CDT)
- Area code: 608
- FIPS code: 55-62050
- GNIS feature ID: 1583910

Perry is a town in Dane County, Wisconsin, United States. The population was 737 at the 2020 census. The unincorporated communities of Daleyville and Forward are located in the town.

== Geography ==
According to the United States Census Bureau, the town has a total area of 36.1 square miles (93.6 km^{2}), all of it land.

== Demographics ==
At the 2000 census there were 670 people, 253 households, and 197 families living in the town. The population density was 18.5 people per square mile (7.2/km^{2}). There were 263 housing units at an average density of 7.3 per square mile (2.8/km^{2}). The racial makeup of the town was 98.36% White, 0.30% African American, 0.60% Asian, and 0.75% from two or more races. Hispanic or Latino of any race were 0.75%.

Of the 253 households 34.0% had children under the age of 18 living with them, 67.6% were married couples living together, 4.3% had a female householder with no husband present, and 22.1% were non-families. 15.4% of households were one person and 2.4% were one person aged 65 or older. The average household size was 2.65 and the average family size was 2.98.

The age distribution was 25.5% under the age of 18, 3.1% from 18 to 24, 33.1% from 25 to 44, 28.7% from 45 to 64, and 9.6% 65 or older. The median age was 40 years. For every 100 females, there were 104.9 males. For every 100 females age 18 and over, there were 107.1 males.

The median household income was $57,125 and the median family income was $62,222. Males had a median income of $38,906 versus $24,875 for females. The per capita income for the town was $22,596. About 5.0% of families and 6.2% of the population were below the poverty line, including 6.1% of those under age 18 and 6.7% of those age 65 or over.
