= East Side Historic District =

East Side Historic District may refer to:

- East Side Historic District (Longmont, Colorado), listed on the National Register of Historic Places in Boulder County, Colorado
- East Side Historic District (Kalispell, Montana), listed on the National Register of Historic Places in Flathead County, Montana
- East Side Historic District (Catskill, New York), listed on the National Register of Historic Places in Greene County, New York
- East Side Historic District (Saratoga Springs, New York), listed on the National Register of Historic Places in Saratoga County, New York
- East Side Historic District (Bryan, Texas), listed on the National Register of Historic Places in Brazos County, Texas
- East Side Historic District (Stoughton, Wisconsin), listed on the National Register of Historic Places in Dane County, Wisconsin
- Near East Side Historic District, listed on the National Register of Historic Places in Rock County, Wisconsin
