= East Side Historic District (Stoughton, Wisconsin) =

Historic district in Wisconsin, United States

- U.S. National Register of Historic Places
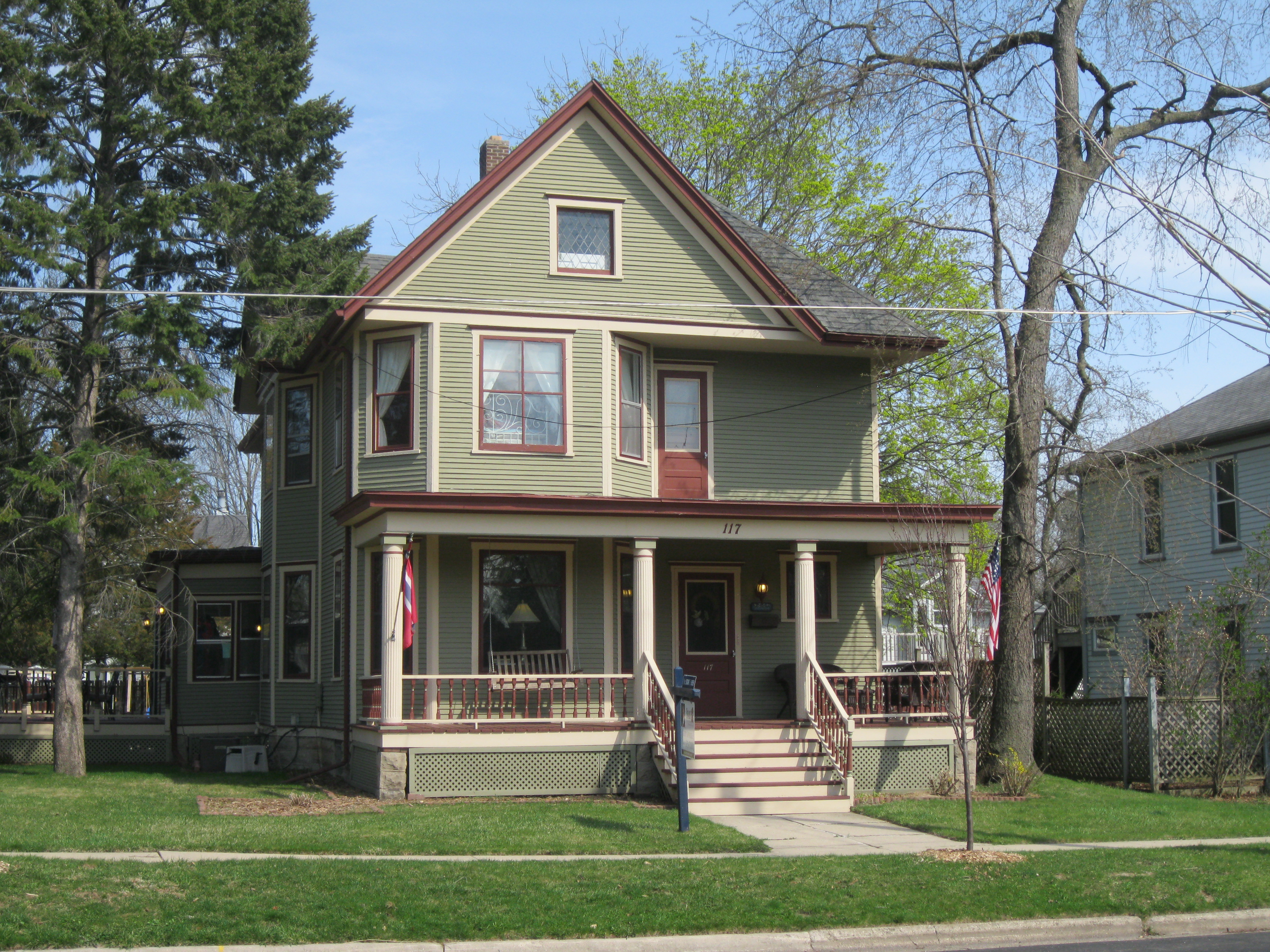
- A house located within the district.
- Location: Roughly bounded by Ridge, Henry, Vernon, and Academy Sts., Stoughton, Wisconsin
- Area: 25 acres (10 ha)
- NRHP reference No.: 96001577
- Added to NRHP: January 9, 1997

The East Side Historic District is a historic neighborhood of Stoughton, Wisconsin of stylish homes built mostly from 1890 to 1915. It was added to the State Register of Historic Places in 1996 and added to the National Register of Historic Places in the following year.

Over half the contributing buildings in the district are Queen Anne style, which is no surprise for the period built. Here are good examples of the styles present:

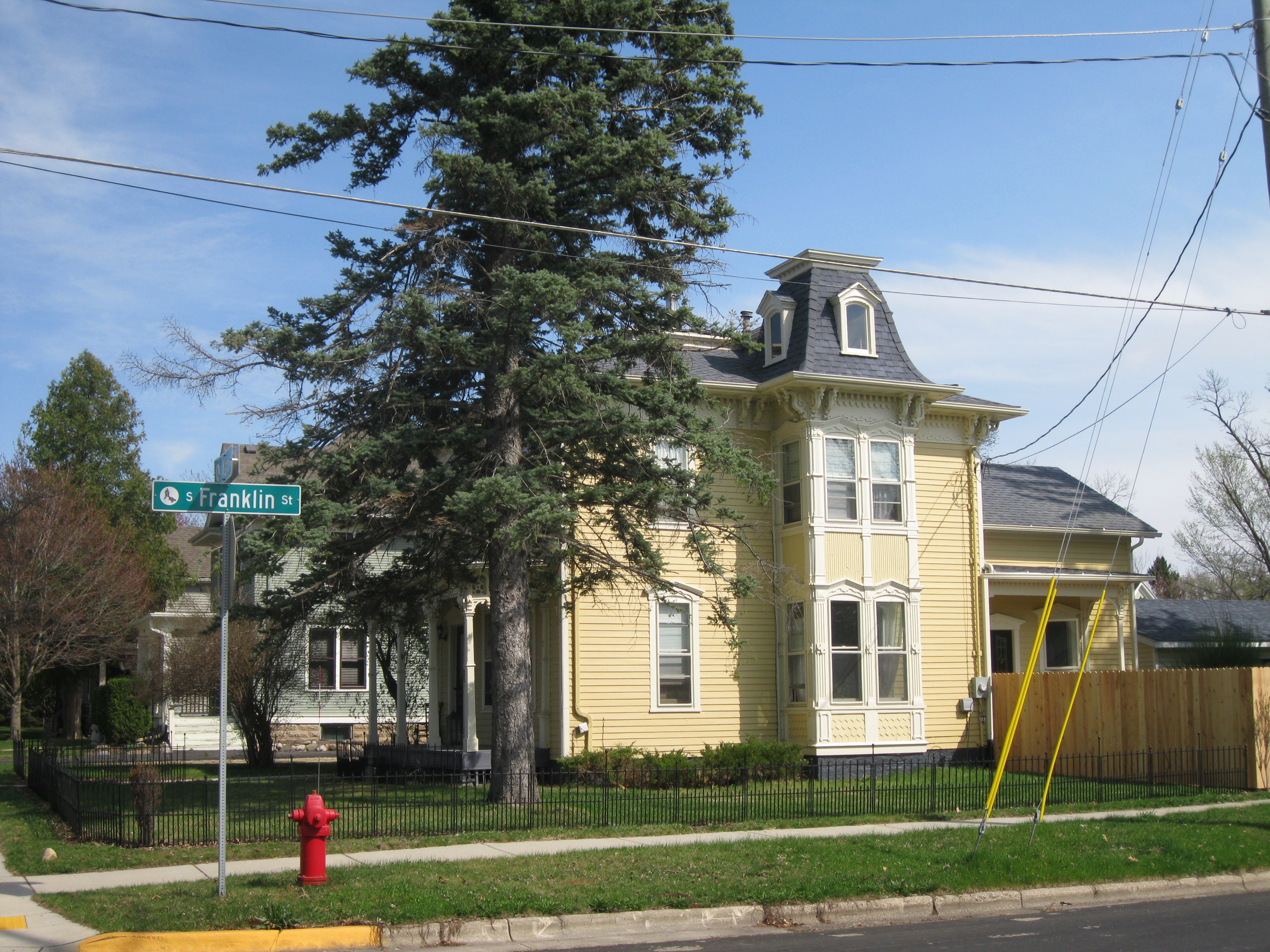
Bjoin house (Italianate-style)

- The Bjoin house at 1001 E. Main Street is a 2-story Italianate-styled house built in the 1880s. The main block is clad in clapboard, with a wide frieze-board and brackets supporting the eaves. Above is a hipped roof with a central deck. A 3-story bay on the west side rises to a tower with a mansard roof. The front porch spans most of the north side, decorated with spindlework and an elaborate cut-out frieze.

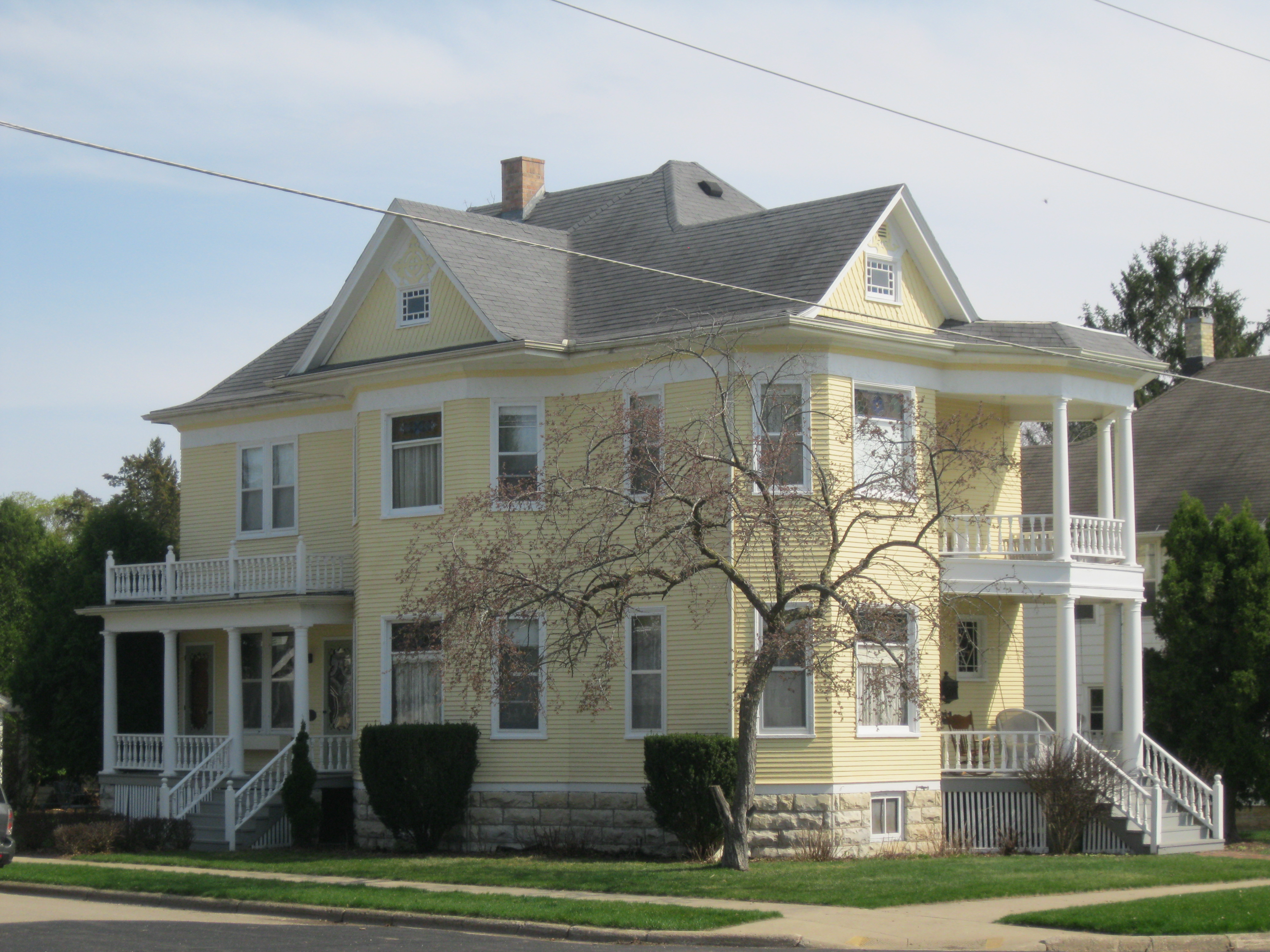
Rinde house (Queen Anne-style)

- The Rinde house at 201 S. Franklin Street is a 2-story frame Queen Anne-styled house built in 1904. Typical of the style, it is asymmetric with wood shingles cut to give a different texture in the gables, and has a complex roof. The 2-story corner front porch is rather unusual. Lewis Rinde dealt in real estate.
- The Severson house at 1124 E. Main Street is a 2-story Neoclassical-styled house built in 1904. Typical of the style, the front portico is supported by two Ionic columns and the building's corners are trimmed with pilasters. The roof is hipped with two gable-roofed dormers. Henry Severson had two tobacco farms and one of the first autos in town.

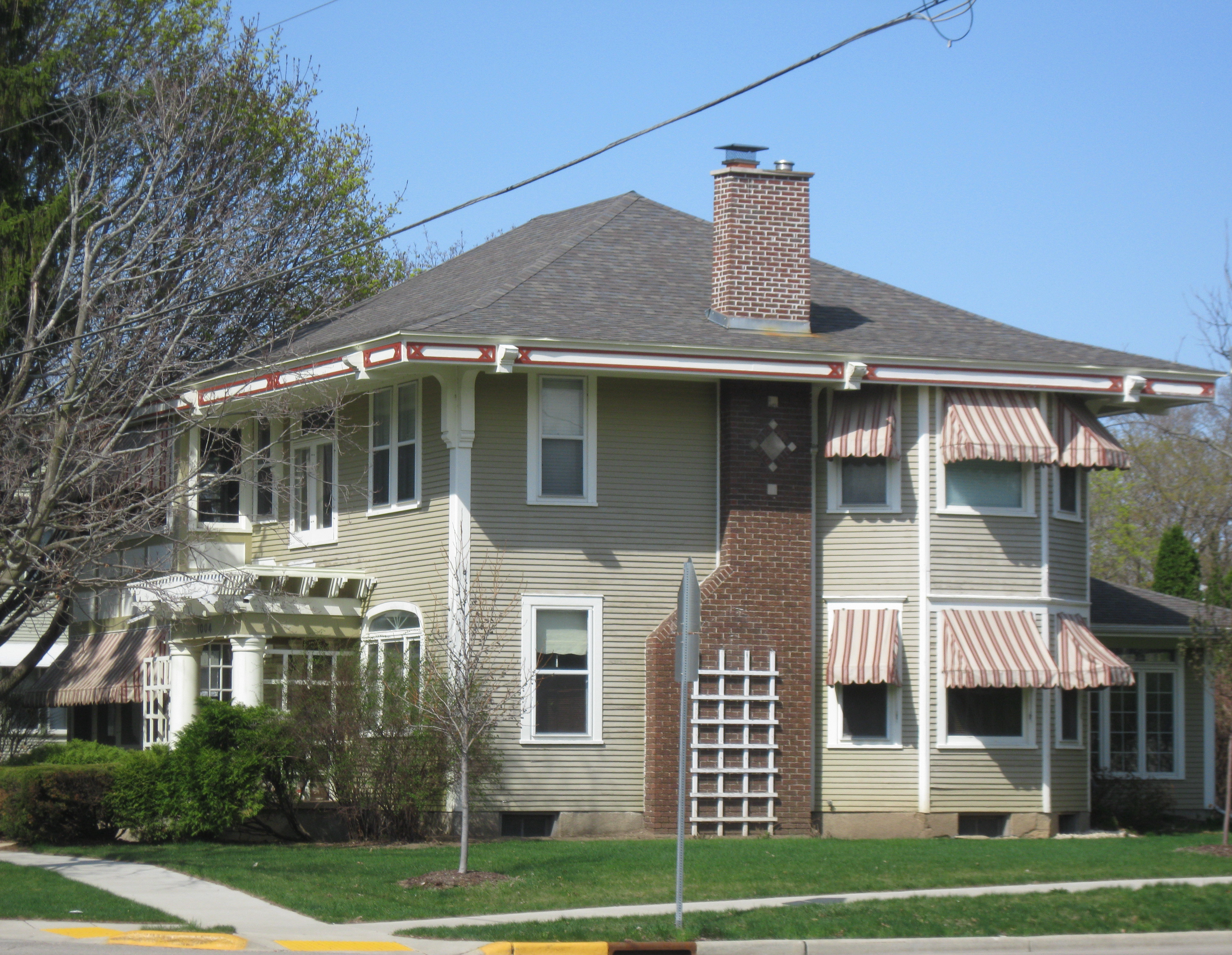
Holtan house (Prairie style)

- The Holtan house at 1004 E. Main Street is a Prairie School-style house. The Holtans built a house here in 1896, but it was probably rebuilt or extensively remodeled around 1911 to a style then current. Typical of Prairie school is the horizontal emphasis in the wide, flared eaves. Unusual is the decorated fascia on the eaves. John Holtan managed the American Cigar Company, and served mayor and president of the First National Bank of Stoughton.
