= East Side Historic District (Catskill, New York) =

Historic district in New York, United States

- U.S. National Register of Historic Places
- U.S. Historic district
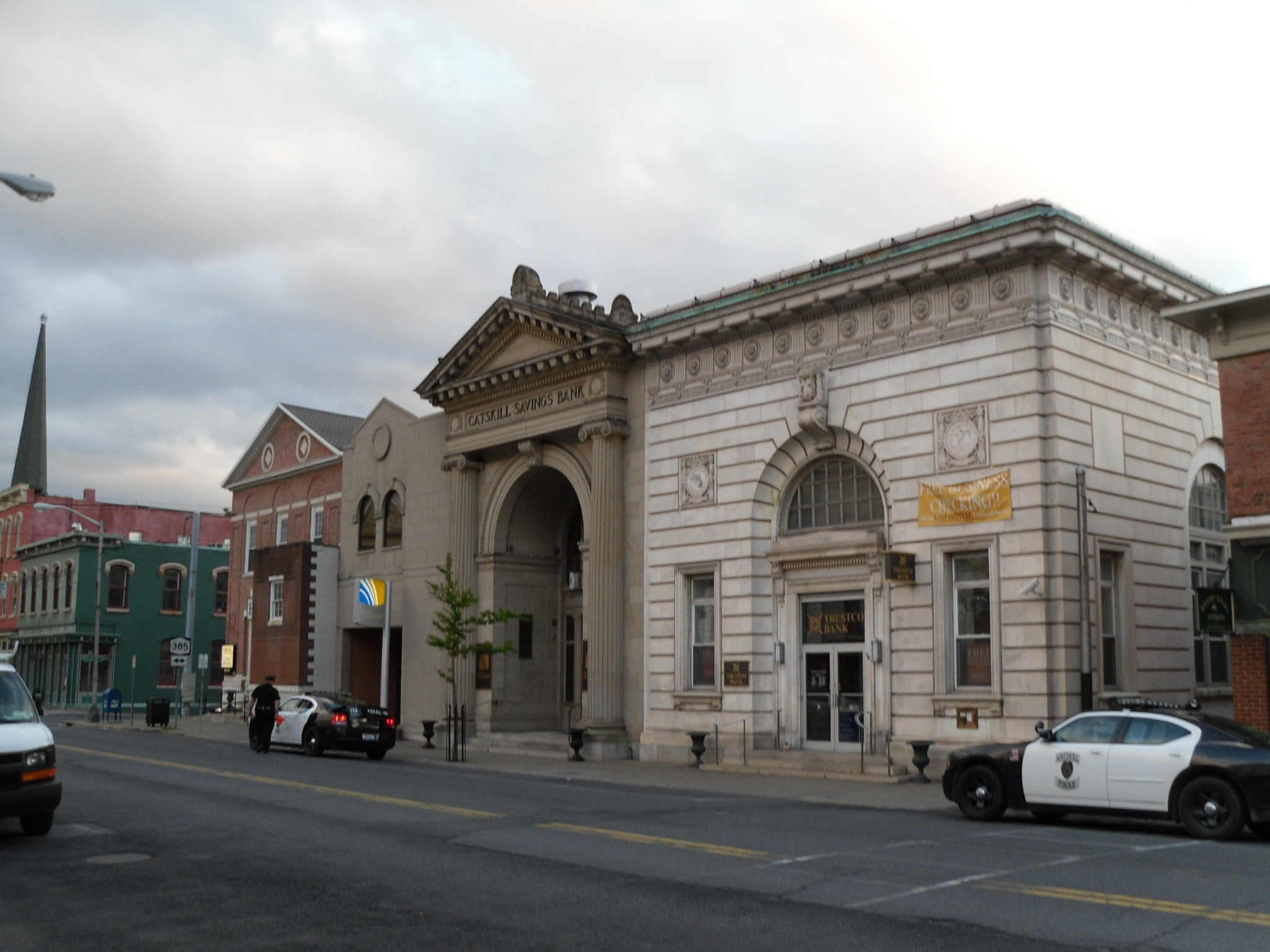
- Main Street, East Side Historic District, May 2010

- Location within New York Location within the United States
- Location: Roughly bounded by Catskill Creek, Hudson River, River, Harrison, Day, and Gardner Sts., Catskill, New York
- Coordinates: 42°13′7″N 73°51′44″W
- Area: 200 acres (81 ha)
- Architect: Multiple
- Architectural style: Mixed (more Than 2 Styles From Different Periods)
- NRHP reference No.: 82004779
- Added to NRHP: August 9, 1982

East Side Historic District in Catskill, Greene County, New York is an area roughly bounded by Catskill Creek, Hudson River, and River, Harrison, Day, and Gardner Streets. It includes 530 contributing buildings and one contributing site over a 200 acres (81 ha) area. The Thomas Cole House is a National Historic Landmark and National Historic Site in the district.

It was listed on the National Register of Historic Places in 1982.
