= 48th Wisconsin Legislature =

Wisconsin legislative term for 1907–1908

| ← | 47th | 49th | → |
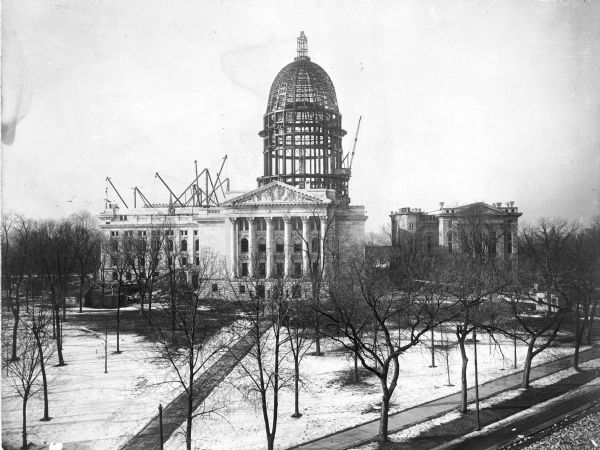
- Wisconsin State Capitol under reconstruction after the 1904 fire

Overview
- Legislative body: Wisconsin Legislature
- Meeting place: Wisconsin State Capitol
- Term: January 7, 1907 – January 4, 1909
- Election: November 6, 1906

Senate
- Members: 33
- Senate President: William D. Connor (R)
- President pro tempore: James Huff Stout (R)
- Party control: Republican

Assembly
- Members: 100
- Assembly Speaker: Herman Ekern (R)
- Party control: Republican

Sessions
- 1st: January 9, 1907 – July 16, 1907

The Forty-Eighth Wisconsin Legislature convened from January 9, 1907, to July 16, 1907, in regular session. During this term, legislative business was largely held in the north wing of the Wisconsin State Capitol, which was the only part of the capitol to remain intact after the 1904 fire.

This session saw the first ever African American member of the Wisconsin Legislature—Lucian H. Palmer of Milwaukee.

Senators representing odd-numbered districts were newly elected for this session and were serving the first two years of a four-year term. Assembly members were elected to a two-year term. Assembly members and odd-numbered senators were elected in the general election of November 6, 1906. Senators representing even-numbered districts were serving the third and fourth year of a four-year term, having been elected in the general election of November 8, 1904.

The governor of Wisconsin during this entire term was Republican James O. Davidson, of Crawford County, serving his first full two-year term, having won election in the 1906 Wisconsin gubernatorial election.

== Major events ==
- February 15, 1907: The Gentlemen's Agreement of 1907 was reached between representatives of the United States and the Empire of Japan, in which Japan would restrict emigration to the U.S., and the U.S. would stop imposing restrictions on Japanese immigrants.
- February 16, 1907: George E. Bryant, the incumbent Wisconsin Superintendent of Public Property, died in office.
- March 3, 1907: John Coit Spooner, Wisconsin's influential senior United States senator, unexpectedly announced his resignation from office, effective May 1.
- May 17, 1907: After a long and contentious nominating process in the Republican caucus, Isaac Stephenson was elected United States Senator by the Wisconsin Legislature in joint session to fill the remainder of John C. Spooner's term.
- July 3, 1907: A tornado struck Neillsville, Wisconsin, resulting in at least 15 deaths.
- October 24, 1907: A major U.S. financial crisis was averted by a group of Wall Street financiers who pooled $25,000,000 to prop up failing stocks during the Panic of 1907.
- December 30, 1907: Wisconsin Supreme Court chief justice John B. Cassoday died in office. He was immediately succeeded, as chief justice, by John B. Winslow, due to the rule of seniority.
- January 8, 1908: Robert McKee Bashford was appointed to the Wisconsin Supreme Court by Governor James O. Davidson, to replace the deceased justice John B. Cassoday for the remainder of the 1907–1908 court term.
- April 7, 1908: John Barnes defeated the recently appointed Robert McKee Bashford in the Wisconsin Supreme Court election to fill the seat of deceased justice John B. Cassoday, for the term beginning July 1, 1908.
- June 30, 1908: An asteroid or comet exploded in the air near the Podkamennaya Tunguska in Russia. Known as the Tunguska event, it was the largest impact event on Earth in recorded history.
- November 3, 1908: 1908 United States general election:
  - William Howard Taft elected President of the United States.
  - James O. Davidson re-elected Governor of Wisconsin.
  - Voters approved an amendment to the Wisconsin constitution to limit voting rights to only U.S. citizens.
  - Voters approved an amendment to the Wisconsin constitution to limit the time allowed for gubernatorial vetoes.
  - Voters approved an amendment to the Wisconsin constitution to allow the state to implement an income tax.
  - Voters approved an amendment to the Wisconsin constitution to allow the state to implement a highway funding mechanism.

== Major legislation ==
- Joint Resolution to amend section 10, article V, of the constitution, relating to the approval of bills by the governor, 1907 Joint Resolution 13. Second legislative approval of the constitutional amendment to limit the time allowed for a gubernatorial veto. This amendment was then ratified by voters in the 1908 fall general election.
- Joint Resolution providing for an amendment to section 10, article VIII of the constitution, relating to internal improvements, 1907 Joint Resolution 18. Second legislative approval of the constitutional amendment to authorize the state to fund highway construction. This amendment was also ratified in the 1908 fall general election.
- Joint Resolution to amend section 3 of article X of the constitution, relating to the school age of children, 1907 Joint Resolution 23. Proposed an amendment to the state constitution to make public school cover children from age six to 20.
- Joint Resolution to amend section 1 of article III of the constitution, relating to electors, 1907 Joint Resolution 25. Second legislative approval of the constitutional amendment to limit voting rights to only U.S. citizens. This amendment was also ratified in the 1908 fall general election.
- Joint Resolution 28, 1907 Joint Resolution 28. Reiterating Wisconsin's call for an amendment to the U.S. constitution for direct election of U.S. senators.
- Joint Resolution 29, 1907 Joint Resolution 29. Second legislative approval of the constitutional amendment to authorize a state income tax. This amendment was also ratified in the 1908 fall general election.
- Joint Resolution providing an amendment to section 3 of article IV, ox the constitution of the state of Wisconsin, relating to apportionment, 1907 Joint Resolution 30. Proposing an amendment to the state constitution to make redistricting a once-per-decade process following the release of the decennial U.S. census. U to this time, Wisconsin had conducted redistricting twice per decade.
- Joint Resolution to amend section 10 of article VIII of the constitution, 1907 Joint Resolution 31. Proposed an amendment to the state constitution to allow the state to more directly invest in certain public works projects.
- Joint Resolution to amend section 21 of article IV of the constitution, relating to the compensation of members of the legislature, 1907 Joint Resolution 35. Proposing an amendment to the state constitution to double the compensation for legislators.

== Party summary ==
=== Senate summary ===
Senate partisan composition Democratic: 5 seats Social Dem.: 1 seat Republican: 27 seats

| | Party (Shading indicates majority caucus) | | | Total | |
| | Dem. | S.D. | Rep. | Total | Vacant |
|---|---|---|---|---|---|
| End of previous Legislature | 4 | 1 | 28 | 33 | 0 |
| Start of 1st Session | 5 | 1 | 27 | 33 | 0 |
| Final voting share | 18.18% | | 81.82% | | |
| Beginning of the next Legislature | 4 | 1 | 28 | 33 | 0 |

=== Assembly summary ===
Assembly partisan composition Democratic: 19 seats Social Dem.: 5 seats Republican: 76 seats

| | Party (Shading indicates majority caucus) | | | Total | |
| | Dem. | S.D. | Rep. | Total | Vacant |
|---|---|---|---|---|---|
| End of previous Legislature | 11 | 4 | 84 | 99 | 1 |
| Start of 1st Session | 19 | 5 | 76 | 100 | 0 |
| Final voting share | 24% | | 76% | | |
| Beginning of the next Legislature | 17 | 3 | 80 | 100 | 0 |

== Sessions ==
- 1st Regular session: January 9, 1907 – July 16, 1907

== Leaders ==
=== Senate leadership ===
- President of the Senate: William D. Connor (R)
- President pro tempore: James Huff Stout (R–Menomonie)

=== Assembly leadership ===
- Speaker of the Assembly: Herman Ekern (R–Whitehall)

== Members ==
=== Members of the Senate ===
Members of the Senate for the Forty-Eighth Wisconsin Legislature:

Senate partisan representation Democratic: 5 seats Social Dem.: 1 seat Republican: 27 seats

| Dist. | Counties | Senator | Residence | Party |
|---|---|---|---|---|
| 01 | Door, Kewaunee, & Marinette | Harlan P. Bird | Wausaukee | Rep. |
| 02 | Brown & Oconto | Henry F. Hagemeister | Green Bay | Rep. |
| 03 | Kenosha & Racine | Isaac T. Bishop | Somers | Rep. |
| 04 | Milwaukee (Northern Part) | Theodore C. Froemming | Milwaukee | Rep. |
| 05 | Milwaukee (City Center) | Edward T. Fairchild | Milwaukee | Rep. |
| 06 | Milwaukee (City Northwest) | Jacob Rummel | Milwaukee | Soc.D. |
| 07 | Milwaukee (Southern & Western County) | George E. Page | Milwaukee | Rep. |
| 08 | Milwaukee (City South) | Julius E. Roehr | Milwaukee | Rep. |
| 09 | Adams, Marquette, Waushara, & Wood | Theodore W. Brazeau | Grand Rapids | Rep. |
| 10 | Pierce & St. Croix | Walter C. Owen | Maiden Rock | Rep. |
| 11 | Burnett, Douglas, & Polk | George Hudnall | Superior | Rep. |
| 12 | Ashland, Bayfield, Price, Sawyer, Taylor, & Washburn | Albert W. Sanborn | Ashland | Rep. |
| 13 | Dodge | Paul O. Husting | Mayville | Dem. |
| 14 | Outagamie & Shawano | Fred M. Wilcox | Appleton | Rep. |
| 15 | Calumet & Manitowoc | Samuel W. Randolph | Manitowoc | Dem. |
| 16 | Crawford & Grant | Edward E. Burns | Platteville | Rep. |
| 17 | Green, Iowa, & Lafayette | Harry C. Martin | Darlington | Rep. |
| 18 | Fond du Lac & Green Lake | Charles H. Smith | Markesan | Dem. |
| 19 | Winnebago | John A. Fridd | | Rep. |
| 20 | Ozaukee & Sheboygan | George W. Wolff | Rhine | Rep. |
| 21 | Portage & Waupaca | Edward E. Browne | Waupaca | Rep. |
| 22 | Rock | John M. Whitehead | Janesville | Rep. |
| 23 | Jefferson & Walworth | John A. Hazelwood | Jefferson | Dem. |
| 24 | Chippewa, Eau Claire, & Rusk | James H. Noble | Eau Claire | Rep. |
| 25 | Clark & Marathon | Spencer M. Marsh | Neillsville | Rep. |
| 26 | Dane | Albert M. Stondall | Madison | Rep. |
| 27 | Columbia & Sauk | Charles L. Pearson | Greenfield | Dem. |
| 28 | Richland, & Vernon | Oliver Munson | Viroqua | Rep. |
| 29 | Barron, Buffalo, Dunn, & Pepin | James H. Stout | Menomonie | Rep. |
| 30 | Florence, Forest, Iron, Langlade, Lincoln, Oneida, & Vilas | James A. Wright | Merrill | Rep. |
| 31 | Jackson, Juneau, & Monroe | H. W. Barker | | Rep. |
| 32 | La Crosse & Trempealeau | Thomas Morris | La Crosse | Rep. |
| 33 | Washington & Waukesha | Henry Lockney | Waukesha | Rep. |

=== Members of the Assembly ===
Members of the Assembly for the Forty-Eighth Wisconsin Legislature:

Assembly partisan composition Democratic: 19 seats Social Dem.: 5 seats Republican: 76 seats

Milwaukee County districts

| Senate District | County | Dist. | Representative | Party | Residence |
|---|---|---|---|---|---|
| 09 | Adams & Marquette | | Frank J. Kimball | Rep. | Briggsville |
| 12 | Ashland | | Ove H. Berg | Rep. | Ashland |
| 29 | Barron | | George E. Scott | Rep. | Prairie Farm |
| 12 | Bayfield, Sawyer, & Washburn | | Lorenzo Clausen | Rep. | Washburn |
| 02 | Brown | 1 | Timothy Burke | Rep. | Green Bay |
| 02 | Brown | 2 | Wallace Hager | Rep. | De Pere |
| 29 | Buffalo & Pepin | | C. A. Ingram | Rep. | Durand |
| 11 | Burnett & Polk | | J. P. Peterson | Rep. | Luck |
| 15 | Calumet | | Henry Rollmann | Dem. | Chilton |
| 24 | Chippewa & Rusk | 1 | Thomas A. Roycraft | Rep. | Eagle Point |
| 24 | Chippewa & Rusk | 2 | Theodore M. Thomas | Rep. | Ladysmith |
| 25 | Clark | | F. M. Jackson | Rep. | Colby |
| 27 | Columbia | 1 | John Scott | Rep. | Dekorra |
| 27 | Columbia | 2 | William R. Turner | Rep. | Columbus |
| 16 | Crawford | | Jeremiah O'Neil | Dem. | Wauzeka |
| 26 | Dane | 1 | Elmore Elver | Dem. | Madison |
| 26 | Dane | 2 | Ole P. Sorenson | Rep. | Marshall |
| 26 | Dane | 3 | Thomas A. Stewart | Dem. | Verona |
| 13 | Dodge | 1 | Frank S. Bauer | Dem. | LeRoy |
| 13 | Dodge | 2 | John F. Hughes | Dem. | |
| 01 | Door | | Thomas Reynolds | Rep. | Jacksonport |
| 11 | Douglas | 1 | Albert W. Durley | Rep. | Superior |
| 11 | Douglas | 2 | Ray J. Nye | Rep. | Superior |
| 29 | Dunn | | D. C. Coolidge | Rep. | |
| 24 | Eau Claire | 1 | David L. Douglas | Dem. | Eau Claire |
| 24 | Eau Claire | 2 | W. A. Cernahan | Dem. | |
| 30 | Florence, Forest, & Langlade | | E. F. Nelson | Rep. | Rolling |
| 18 | Fond du Lac | 1 | Christian Pickart | Dem. | Marshfield |
| 18 | Fond du Lac | 2 | Fred E. Soper | Rep. | Ripon |
| 16 | Grant | 1 | Duncan McGregor | Rep. | Platteville |
| 16 | Grant | 2 | Henry Roethe | Rep. | Fennimore |
| 17 | Green | | Fred Ties | Rep. | Brodhead |
| 18 | Green Lake | | Christian C. Wellensgard | Rep. | Berlin |
| 17 | Iowa | | David J. Morris | Rep. | Ridgeway |
| 30 | Iron, Oneida, & Vilas | | Edward A. Everett | Rep. | Eagle River |
| 31 | Jackson | | John F. Baker | Rep. | Alma Center |
| 23 | Jefferson | 1 | Fred Smith | Dem. | Ixonia |
| 23 | Jefferson | 2 | George W. Kindlin | Dem. | Koshkonong |
| 31 | Juneau | | J. D. Harring | Rep. | Armenia |
| 03 | Kenosha | | Walker M. Curtiss | Rep. | Salem |
| 01 | Kewaunee | | Anton G. Schauer | Rep. | Carlton |
| 32 | La Crosse | 1 | Thomas H. Miller | Rep. | La Crosse |
| 32 | La Crosse | 2 | V. S. Keppel | Rep. | Onalaska |
| 17 | Lafayette | | M. J. Cleary | Rep. | Blanchardville |
| 30 | Lincoln | | F. W. Kubasta | Rep. | Merrill |
| 15 | Manitowoc | 1 | Simon F. Wehrwein | Rep. | Newton |
| 15 | Manitowoc | 2 | Lawrence W. Ledvina | Rep. | Two Rivers |
| 25 | Marathon | 1 | Nicholas Schmidt | Dem. | Marathon City |
| 25 | Marathon | 2 | August F. Marquardt | Rep. | Wausau |
| 01 | Marinette | 1 | Edward W. LeRoy | Rep. | Marinette |
| 01 | Marinette | 2 | W. H. Falvey | Rep. | Stephenson |
| 04 | Milwaukee | 1 | H. H. Heilbron | Rep. | Milwaukee |
| 05 | Milwaukee | 2 | Otto Harrass | Rep. | Milwaukee |
| 07 | Milwaukee | 3 | William Disch | Rep. | Milwaukee |
| 05 | Milwaukee | 4 | George Grassie | Rep. | Milwaukee |
| 08 | Milwaukee | 5 | William Alldridge | Soc.D. | Milwaukee |
| 05 | Milwaukee | 6 | Lucian H. Palmer | Rep. | Milwaukee |
| 07 | Milwaukee | 7 | Elmer Cain | Rep. | Wauwatosa |
| 08 | Milwaukee | 8 | Simon Kander | Rep. | Milwaukee |
| 06 | Milwaukee | 9 | Edmund J. Berner | Soc.D. | Milwaukee |
| 06 | Milwaukee | 10 | Herman Georgi | Rep. | Milwaukee |
| 08 | Milwaukee | 11 | Frederick Brockhausen | Soc.D. | Milwaukee |
| 06 | Milwaukee | 12 | Carl D. Thompson | Soc.D. | Milwaukee |
| 04 | Milwaukee | 13 | Charles E. Estabrook | Rep. | Milwaukee |
| 07 | Milwaukee | 14 | Joseph Domachowski | Dem. | Milwaukee |
| 04 | Milwaukee | 15 | Jacob Luy | Rep. | Milwaukee |
| 06 | Milwaukee | 16 | Frank J. Weber | Soc.D. | Milwaukee |
| 31 | Monroe | | John R. Jones | Rep. | Leon |
| 02 | Oconto | | W. J. McGee | Rep. | Oconto |
| 14 | Outagamie | 1 | Fred Petersen | Dem. | Appleton |
| 14 | Outagamie | 2 | Charles J. Hagen | Rep. | Black Creek |
| 20 | Ozaukee | | William J. Bichler | Dem. | Belgium |
| 10 | Pierce | | William A. Kay | Rep. | Martell |
| 21 | Portage | | Fred J. Carpenter | Rep. | Stevens Point |
| 12 | Price & Taylor | | Charles F. Stout | Rep. | Westboro |
| 03 | Racine | 1 | William H. Bell | Rep. | Racine |
| 03 | Racine | 2 | John O. Thomas | Rep. | Caledonia |
| 28 | Richland | | Levi H. Bancroft | Rep. | Richland Center |
| 22 | Rock | 1 | Allen S. Baker | Rep. | Evansville |
| 22 | Rock | 2 | Pliny Norcross | Rep. | Janesville |
| 22 | Rock | 3 | Simon Smith | Rep. | Beloit |
| 27 | Sauk | 1 | Wilbur Cahoon | Rep. | Baraboo |
| 27 | Sauk | 2 | Frank F. Mueller | Rep. | Reedsburg |
| 14 | Shawano | | Antone Kuckuk | Rep. | Shawano |
| 20 | Sheboygan | 1 | John M. Detling | Dem. | Sheboygan |
| 20 | Sheboygan | 2 | Edward J. Keyes | Rep. | Lyndon |
| 10 | St. Croix | | Peter C. Anderson | Dem. | Hammond |
| 32 | Trempealeau | | Herman Ekern | Rep. | Whitehall |
| 28 | Vernon | | David F. Mains | Rep. | Viroqua |
| 23 | Walworth | | Edward H. Sprague | Rep. | Elkhorn |
| 33 | Washington | | B. S. Potter | Dem. | West Bend |
| 33 | Waukesha | 1 | James A. McKenzie | Rep. | Vernon |
| 33 | Waukesha | 2 | Roderick Ainsworth | Rep. | Merton |
| 21 | Waupaca | 1 | Wesley Irvine | Rep. | |
| 21 | Waupaca | 2 | Otto L. Olen | Rep. | Clintonville |
| 09 | Waushara | | Emil Keup | Rep. | Mount Morris |
| 19 | Winnebago | 1 | William M. Perry | Rep. | Oshkosh |
| 19 | Winnebago | 2 | M. L. Campbell | Dem. | Neenah |
| 19 | Winnebago | 3 | Charles Neitzel | Rep. | Nekimi |
| 09 | Wood | | Clifford R. Goldsworthy | Rep. | Vesper |

== Committees ==
=== Senate committees ===
- Senate Committee on Agriculture – Wolff, chair
- Senate Committee on Banks and Insurance – J. E. Roehr, chair
- Senate Committee on Education – J. H. Stout, chair
- Senate Committee on Elections – Martin, chair
- Senate Committee on Engrossed Bills – Lockney, chair
- Senate Committee on Federal Relations – Stondall, chair
- Senate Committee on the Judiciary – Sanborn, chair
- Senate Committee on Legislative Expenditures and Employees – Morris, chair
- Senate Committee on Manufacturers and Labor – Froemming, chair
- Senate Committee on Military Affairs – Fairchild, chair
- Senate Committee on Public Health – Noble, chair
- Senate Committee on Roads and Bridges – Browne, chair
- Senate Committee on State Affairs – Munson, chair
- Senate Committee on Taxation – Wilcox, chair
- Senate Committee on Towns and Counties – Barker, chair
- Senate Committee on Transportation – Hudnall, chair
- Senate Committee on Villages and Cities – Wright, chair

=== Assembly committees ===
- Assembly Committee on Agriculture – J. A. Fridd, chair
- Assembly Committee on Banks and Insurance – G. E. Scott, chair
- Assembly Committee on Cities – C. E. Estabrook, chair
- Assembly Committee on Dairy and Food – J. A. McKenzie, chair
- Assembly Committee on Dams – E. F. Nelson, chair
- Assembly Committee on Education – D. McGregor, chair
- Assembly Committee on Elections – T. A. Roycraft, chair
- Assembly Committee on Engrossed Bills – L. N. Clausen, chair
- Assembly Committee on Federal Relations – A. J. Jerdee, chair
- Assembly Committee on the Judiciary – C. A. Ingram, chair
- Assembly Committee on Libraries – L. Ledvina, chair
- Assembly Committee on Legislative Expenditures and Employees – F. J. Kimball, chair
- Assembly Committee on Lumber and Mining – F. J. Carpenter, chair
- Assembly Committee on Manufactures and Labor – W. H. Bell, chair
- Assembly Committee on Military Affairs – W. M. Perry, chair
- Assembly Committee on Public Health – W. Irvine, chair
- Assembly Committee on Public Improvements – C. J. Hagen, chair
- Assembly Committee on Roads and Bridges – P. Norcross, chair
- Assembly Committee on State Affairs – W. R. Turner, chair
- Assembly Committee on the State Fair – J. D. Harring, chair
- Assembly Committee on Taxation – E. H. Sprague, chair
- Assembly Committee on Third Reading – H. E. Roethe, chair
- Assembly Committee on Towns and Counties – W. H. Falvey, chair
- Assembly Committee on Transportation – E. W. LeRoy, chair
- Assembly Committee on Villages – D. F. Mains, chair

=== Joint committees ===
- Joint Committee on the Capitol – Whitehead (Sen.) & A. S. Baker (Asm.), co-chairs
- Joint Committee on Charitable and Penal Institutions – Hagemeister(Sen.) & J. O. Thomas (Asm.), co-chairs
- Joint Committee on Claims – Burns (Sen.) & R. Ainsworth (Asm.), co-chairs
- Joint Committee on Enrolled Bills – Marsh (Sen.) & F. Ties (Asm.), co-chairs
- Joint Committee on Fish and Game – Page (Sen.) & E. A. Everett (Asm.), co-chairs
- Joint Committee on Forestry – Bird (Sen.) & W. M. Curtiss (Asm.), co-chairs
- Joint Committee on Printing – Owen (Sen.) & V. S. Keppel (Asm.), co-chairs
- Joint Committee on Revision – Brazeau (Sen.) & C. F. Stout (Asm.), co-chairs
- Joint Committee on Rules – Stout (Sen.) & D. McGregor (Asm.), co-chairs
- Joint Committee on State Departments – Fridd (Sen.) & A. Kuckuk (Asm.), co-chairs
- Special Joint Committee on Apportionment – Whitehead (Sen.) & R. J. Nye (Asm.), co-chairs

== Employees ==
=== Senate employees ===
- Chief Clerk: A. R. Emerson
  - Journal Clerk: R. E. Smith
    - Assistant Journal Clerk: William Gray
  - Bookkeeper: Fred M. Wylie
  - Engrossing Clerk: J. C. Miller
  - Index Clerk: C. W. Rhodes
  - Stenographer Clerks:
    - R. R. Hillyer
    - A. W. Galloway
    - C. R. Welton
    - T. H. Jones
    - F. W. Spencer
    - J. H. Sapiro
    - A. C. Tretow
    - D. W. Swartz
    - John Bessey
  - Typewriter Clerks:
    - R. A. Merrill
    - L. B. Webster
    - O. P. Peterson
    - C. E. Rightor
    - W. T. Kelsey
    - Max Schoetz
- Sergeant-at-Arms: Russell C. Falconer
  - Assistant Sergeant-at-Arms: Charles Good
  - Document Clerk: Elmer Pierce
  - Police: Olaf Goldsbrand
  - Night Watch: M. R. Stanley
  - Night Laborer: K. Thompson
- Postmaster: Christoph Paulus
  - Messengers:
    - Vincent Kalpinski
    - Emil C. Cady
    - John W. Moffatt
    - Harold M. Lampert
    - Karl Helmholz
    - Matthew Button
    - J. W. Damm
    - Harry Cotey

=== Assembly employees ===
- Chief Clerk: C. E. Shaffer
  - Journal Clerk: W. W. Jones
    - Assistant Journal Clerk: G. H. Kiland
  - Bookkeeper: S. S. Summers
  - General Clerk: J. E. Noyes (later I. R. Nash)
    - 2nd General Clerk: W. J. Goldschmidt
  - Enrolling Clerk: R. E. Knoff
  - Engrossing Clerk: N. J. Frey
  - Index Clerk: William L. Bullock
  - Stenographers:
    - G. W. Stevens
    - Burton L. Warriner
    - L. T. Pond
    - March Polk
    - A. J. Nelson
    - C. A. Nickerson
    - Leon Lewis
    - P. H. Presentin
    - James McNeeley
    - L. P. Larson
    - A. T. Twesme
  - Typewriters:
    - C. M. Gillett
    - L. L. Oeland
    - D. E. Mowry
    - J. C. Hawker
    - H. C. Hopson
    - Wendell Woodruff
    - P. L. Priest
- Sergeant-at-Arms: William S. Irvine
  - Assistant Sergeant-at-Arms: H. A. Graham
  - Document Clerk: A. H. Bartlett
    - Assistant Document Clerk: A. E. Hart
  - Police: John Steele
  - Night Watch: Obert Sletton
  - Night Laborers:
    - John Curtin
    - H. G. Hart
- Postmaster: John Harris
  - Assistant Postmaster: J. R. Snyder
  - Messengers:
    - Ed. S. Malone
    - Helmer Femrite
    - A. W. Prehn
    - Lyman Keyes
    - Frank Hagen
    - W. W. Studeman
    - J. W. Gaurke
    - Selmer Gunderson
    - H. W. Kellar
    - Walter Reif
    - C. T. Puls
    - E. S. Polley
