= 1907 United States Senate special election in Wisconsin =

- April 17, 1907 – May 17, 1907
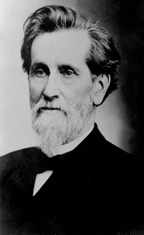

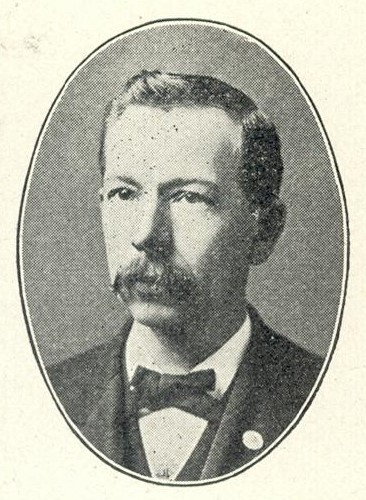
Nominee	Isaac Stephenson	George W. Bird	Jacob Rummel
Party	Republican	Democratic	Social-Democratic
Legislative vote	87	16	4
Percentage	81.31%	14.95%	3.74%
U.S. senator before election
John C. Spooner
Republican
Elected U.S. Senator
Isaac Stephenson
Republican

The 1907 United States Senate special election in Wisconsin was held in the 48th Wisconsin Legislature between April 17, 1907, and May 17, 1907. The special election was necessary to complete the unexpired term of U.S. Senator John Coit Spooner, who announced his resignation in March 1907 and left office April 30. Republican former U.S. representative Isaac Stephenson was elected on the 22nd ballot after a month of voting and negotiation.

In the 1907 term, Republicans held overwhelming majorities in both chambers of the Wisconsin Legislature, so had more than enough votes to elect a Republican United States senator. The main contest was in the Republican legislative caucus, where multiple progressive and conservative factions failed to reach consensus for nearly a month. Progressives ultimately coalesced around 77-year-old former U.S. representative Isaac Stephenson—who had made several previous bids for U.S. Senate—and secured his nomination.

== Major candidates ==
=== Democratic ===
- George W. Bird, prominent lawyer from Madison, Wisconsin.

=== Republican ===
- Henry Allen Cooper, incumbent U.S. representative of Wisconsin's 1st congressional district, from Racine County.
- John J. Esch, incumbent U.S. representative of Wisconsin's 7th congressional district, from La Crosse, Wisconsin.
- William H. Hatton, former state senator from Outagamie County.
- Irvine Lenroot, former Wisconsin Assembly speaker from Superior, Wisconsin.
- Isaac Stephenson, former U.S. representative of Wisconsin's 9th congressional district, from Marinette, Wisconsin.

=== Social-Democratic ===
- Jacob Rummel, incumbent state senator from Milwaukee.

== Results ==
=== Vote on April 17, 1907 ===
1st Vote of the 48th Wisconsin Legislature, April 17, 1907
Party	Candidate	Votes	%
Democratic	George W. Bird	24 (Note: On the 1st and 2nd ballots, Bird received the votes of every Democratic legislator.)	18.32%
Republican	John J. Esch	19 (Note: On the 1st ballot, Esch received the votes of Republican senators H. W. Barker, Theodore W. Brazeau, Theodore C. Froemming, Spencer M. Marsh, Thomas Morris, Oliver Munson, and James H. Noble, and Republican representatives John Franklin Baker, Jacob D. Harring, C. A. Ingram, F. M. Jackson, John R. Jones, Valentine S. Keppel, David F. Mains, Thomas H. Miller, Elwyn F. Nelson, Anton G. Schauer, and Simon F. Wehrwein.)	14.50%
Republican	Irvine Lenroot	19 (Note: On the 1st ballot, Lenroot received the votes of Republican senators Edward E. Browne, George Hudnall, Walter C. Owen, and Albert M. Stondall, Republican representatives Roderick Ainsworth, Ove H. Berg, Lorenzo Clausen, Albert W. Durley, William A. Kay, Edward J. Keyes, Frank J. Kimball, Duncan McGregor, James A. McKenzie, Ray J. Nye, Jens Peterson, Thomas A. Roycraft, George E. Scott, and Theodore M. Thomas, and Republican speaker Herman Ekern.)	14.50%
Republican	Henry Allen Cooper	18 (Note: On the 1st ballot, Cooper received the votes of Republican senators Isaac T. Bishop, Edward E. Burns, Henry Lockney, Harry C. Martin, and John Meek Whitehead, and Republican representatives Allen S. Baker, William H. Bell, M. J. Cleary, Walker M. Curtiss, Charles E. Estabrook, Clifford R. Goldsworthy, Jacob Luy, David Morris, Simon Smith, Ole P. Sorenson, Edward H. Sprague, John O. Thomas, and Fred Ties.)	13.74%
Republican	Isaac Stephenson	17 (Note: On the 1st ballot, Stephenson received the votes of Republican senator Harlan P. Bird and Republican representatives Wilbur Cahoon, Elmer Cain, William Disch, William H. Falvey, Herman Georgi, Wallace Hager, Herman H. Heilbron, Simon Kander, Edward Webster LeRoy, William J. McGee, Frank F. Mueller, Thomas Reynolds, Henry Edgar Roethe, Fred E. Soper, William Rufus Turner, and Christian C. Wellensgard.)	12.98%
Republican	William H. Hatton	16	12.21%
Republican	Emil Baensch	6	4.58%
Social-Democratic	Jacob Rummel	5	3.82%
Republican	Frederick C. Winkler	3	2.29%
Republican	Charles E. Estabrook	1	0.76%
Republican	George Hudnall	1 (Note: On the 1st, 2nd, 3rd, 4th, 5th, 6th & 19th ballots, Republican representative George Grassie was the lone vote for George Hudnall.)	0.76%
Republican	John Meek Whitehead	1	0.76%
	Blank	1	0.76%
	Absent or not voting	2	
Majority		66	50.38%
Total votes		131	98.50%
Void election result

=== Votes from April 18 to April 26 ===
2nd–7th Votes of the 48th Wisconsin Legislature, April 18 – April 26, 1907
Party	Candidate	Ballots					
Party	Candidate	Apr. 18	Apr. 19	Apr. 23	Apr. 24	Apr. 25	Apr. 26
Democratic	George W. Bird	24	18	18	21	22	17
Republican	Isaac Stephenson	19	19	20	20	20	18
Republican	John J. Esch	19	18	20	20	19	17
Republican	Henry Allen Cooper	18	19	18	18	19	18
Republican	Irvine Lenroot	18	18	17	17	17	17
Republican	William H. Hatton	16	16	16	16	16	15
Republican	Emil Baensch	6	6	5	5	5	4
Social-Democratic	Jacob Rummel	5	4	5	5	5	4
Republican	Frederick C. Winkler	3	3	3	3	3	1
Republican	George Hudnall	1	1	1	1	1	
Republican	Albert W. Sanborn	1					
Social-Democratic	Carl D. Thompson	1 (Note: On every ballot where he was present and voting, Social-Democratic senator Jacob Rummel voted for Carl D. Thompson.)	1	1	1	1	1
Republican	John Meek Whitehead	1					
Republican	John A. Hazelwood			1	1	1	
Republican	Walter C. Owen			1	1		
Republican	Walter D. Tarrant						1
Absent		1	10	7	4	4	20
Needed for majority		67	62	64	65	65	57
Total votes		132	123	126	129	129	113

=== Vote on April 29, 1907 ===
On April 29, by agreement between the various candidates, most legislators were allowed to be absent, with each declared candidate designating one trusted supporter to arrive and cast a placeholder vote.

8th Vote of the 48th Wisconsin Legislature, April 29, 1907
Party	Candidate	Votes	%
Republican	Emil Baensch	1	12.50%
Republican	John Barnes	1	12.50%
Democratic	George W. Bird	1	12.50%
Republican	Henry Allen Cooper	1	12.50%
Republican	John J. Esch	1	12.50%
Republican	William H. Hatton	1	12.50%
Republican	Irvine Lenroot	1	12.50%
Republican	Isaac Stephenson	1	12.50%
	Absent or not voting	125	
Majority		5	62.50%
Total votes		8	6.02%
Void election result

=== Votes from April 30 to May 10 ===
9th–16th Votes of the 48th Wisconsin Legislature, April 30 – May 10, 1907
Party	Candidate	Ballots							
Party	Candidate	Apr. 30	May 1	May 2	May 3	May 7	May 8	May 9	May 10
Republican	Isaac Stephenson	19	18	19	19	17	26	28	32
Republican	John J. Esch	19	20	19	16	19	21	21	19
Republican	Irvine Lenroot	19	18	18	13	17			
Democratic	George W. Bird	18	18	19	10	14	16	19	14
Republican	Henry Allen Cooper	18	18	17	17	14	18		
Republican	William H. Hatton	16	16	16	15	12	16	22	23
Republican	Emil Baensch	5	5	5	5	5	4	1	1
Social-Democratic	Jacob Rummel	5	5	3	4	4	5	5	5
Republican	Frederick C. Winkler	3	4	3	2		4		
Social-Democratic	Carl D. Thompson	1	1	1	1	1	1	1	1
Republican	John A. Hazelwood	1	1			1		1	1
Republican	Philo A. Orton	1							
Republican	James A. Frear		1		3		2	3	
Republican	W. A. Gordon		1						
Democratic	Barnabas S. Potter		1 (Note: On the 10th ballot, Democratic representative Elmore Elver voted for B. S. Potter.)						
Democratic	Charles H. Weisse		1						
Republican	Thomas H. Gill			1					
Republican	William D. Hoard			1	1				
Republican	John C. Spooner				1				
Republican	George H. Benzenberg					1			
Republican	Duncan McGregor						5	10	20
Republican	George Hudnall						3		
Republican	James Huff Stout						2	1	
Republican	Albert W. Sanborn							6	1
Republican	Charles E. Estabrook							4	1
Republican	Harry C. Martin							3	1
Republican	Albert M. Stondall							1	
Republican	C. G. Pearse							1	
Republican	Otis Wells Johnson								1
Republican	David F. Mains								1
Absent		8	5	11	26	28	10	6	12
Needed for majority		63	65	62	54	53	62	64	61
Total votes		125	128	122	107	105	123	127	121

=== Vote on May 13, 1907 ===
On May 13, by agreement between the various candidates, most legislators were allowed to be absent, with each declared candidate designating one trusted supporter to arrive and cast a placeholder vote.

17th Vote of the 48th Wisconsin Legislature, May 13, 1907
Party	Candidate	Votes	%
Democratic	George W. Bird	1	20.00%
Republican	John J. Esch	1	20.00%
Republican	William H. Hatton	1	20.00%
Republican	Duncan McGregor	1	20.00%
Republican	Isaac Stephenson	1	20.00%
	Absent or not voting	128	
Majority		3	60.00%
Total votes		5	3.76%
Void election result

=== Votes from May 14 to May 16 ===
18th–21st Votes of the 48th Wisconsin Legislature, May 14 – May 16, 1907
Party	Candidate	Ballots			
Party	Candidate	May 14	May 15	May 16 (9am)	May 16 (noon)
Republican	Isaac Stephenson	31	44	46	48
Republican	William H. Hatton	25	26	52	53
Republican	Duncan McGregor	23	3	1	2
Republican	John J. Esch	20	28	2	
Democratic	George W. Bird	15	11	14	16
Social-Democratic	Jacob Rummel	4 (Note: On the 18th, 19th, 20th, & 21st ballots, Rummel received the votes of all Social-Democrats except representative Frank J. Weber (who was absent) and Rummel himself (who voted for Carl D. Thompson).)	4	4	4
Republican	James A. Frear	1 (Note: On the 18th ballot, Republican representative William A. Kay voted for James A. Frear.)			
Republican	John A. Hazelwood	1 (Note: On the 18th ballot, Republican representative George Grassie voted for John A. Hazelwood.)			
Democratic	Henry L. Palmer	1 (Note: On the 18th ballot, Democratic senator Charles L. Pearson voted for H. L. Palmer.)			
Social-Democratic	Carl D. Thompson	1	1	1	1
Democratic	Charles H. Weisse		2 (Note: On the 19th ballot, Democratic representatives William J. Bichler and John M. Detling voted for Charles H. Weisse.)		
Republican	George Brumder		1 (Note: On the 19th ballot, Republican representative Jacob Luy voted for George Brumder.)		
Democratic	Joseph E. Davies		1 (Note: On the 19th and 20th ballots, Democratic representative Fred Smith voted for Joseph E. Davies.)	1	
Democratic	David L. Douglas		1 (Note: On the 19th and 20th ballots, Democratic representative Elmore Elver voted for David L. Douglas.)	1	
Republican	George Hudnall		1		1 (Note: On the 21st ballot, Republican representative Clifford R. Goldsworthy voted for George Hudnall.)
Democratic	D. S. Rose		1 (Note: On the 19th and 20th ballots, Democratic representative Joseph Domachowski voted for D. S. Rose.)	1	
Republican	Albert W. Sanborn		1 (Note: On the 19th ballot, Republican representative Ove H. Berg voted for A. W. Sanborn.)		
Republican	Samuel A. Cook			1 (Note: On the 20th ballot, Republican representative Otto Harrass voted for Samuel A. Cook.)	
Republican	Irvine Lenroot			1 (Note: On the 20th ballot, Republican representative Ray J. Nye voted for Irvine Lenroot.)	
Democratic	George Wilbur Peck				1 (Note: On the 21st ballot, Democratic representative Joseph Domachowski voted for George W. Peck.)
Absent		11	8	8	7
Needed for majority		62	63	63	64
Total votes		122	125	125	126

=== Republican caucus on May 16, 1907 ===
On the evening of May 16, 1907, William H. Hatton expected to secure the nomination after coming within two votes of the caucus majority earlier that day. Lieutenant Governor William D. Connor was credited with denying Hatton the nomination after he managed to convince representatives Clifford R. Goldsworthy and Elwyn F. Nelson to withhold their support. Hatton's support collapsed during the roll call vote, with Goldsworthy, Nelson, and Duncan McGregor leading the rout. Instead Isaac Stephenson achieved a majority with 55 of 98 votes cast, and the caucus then moved to make him their unanimous nominee.

=== Vote on May 17, 1907 ===
The legislature re-convened in joint session on May 17. Voting proceeded exactly along party lines, with 26 members absent. Stephenson received the support of all the Republicans present and voting and was elected U.S. senator.

22nd Vote of the 48th Wisconsin Legislature, May 17, 1907
Party	Candidate	Votes	%
Republican	Isaac Stephenson	87	81.31%
Democratic	George W. Bird	16	14.95%
Social-Democratic	Jacob Rummel	4 (Note: On the 22nd ballot, Rummel received the votes of all Social-Democrats except representative Frank J. Weber (who was absent) and Rummel himself (who did not cast a vote).)	3.74%
	Absent or not voting	26	
Majority		54	50.47%
Total votes		107	80.45%
Republican hold			
