= 49th Wisconsin Legislature =

Wisconsin legislative term for 1909–1910

←	48th	50th	→
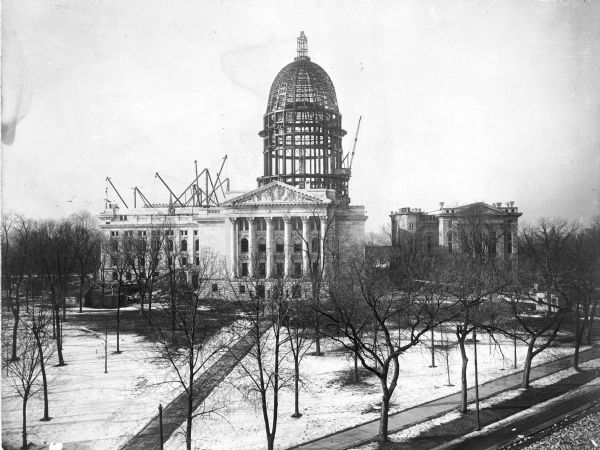
- Wisconsin State Capitol under reconstruction after the 1904 fire

Overview
- Legislative body: Wisconsin Legislature
- Meeting place: Wisconsin State Capitol
- Term: January 4, 1909 – January 2, 1911
- Election: November 3, 1908

Senate
- Members: 33
- Senate President: John Strange (R)
- President pro tempore: James Huff Stout (R)
- Party control: Republican

Assembly
- Members: 100
- Assembly Speaker: Levi H. Bancroft (R)
- Party control: Republican

Sessions
- 1st: January 13, 1909 – June 18, 1909

The Forty-Ninth Wisconsin Legislature convened from January 13, 1909, to June 18, 1909, in regular session. During this term, legislative business was largely held in the north wing of the Wisconsin State Capitol, which was the only part of the capitol to remain intact after the 1904 fire.

Senators representing even-numbered districts were newly elected for this session and were serving the first two years of a four-year term. Assembly members were elected to a two-year term. Assembly members and even-numbered senators were elected in the general election of November 3, 1908. Senators representing odd-numbered districts were serving the third and fourth year of a four-year term, having been elected in the general election of November 6, 1906.

The governor of Wisconsin during this entire term was Republican James O. Davidson, of Crawford County, serving his second full two-year term, having won re-election in the 1908 Wisconsin gubernatorial election.

== Major events ==
- March 4, 1909:
  - After a contentious two-month process, Isaac Stephenson was re-elected as United States senator by the Wisconsin Legislature in joint session.
  - Inauguration of William Howard Taft as the 27th President of the United States.
- August 2, 1909: The United States Signal Corps Aeronautical Division purchased the world's first military airplane, the Wright Military Flyer.
- November 13, 1909: "On, Wisconsin!" was played for the first time at a University of Wisconsin football game against the University of Minnesota. The song would become the official fight song of the University of Wisconsin and the official state song of the state of Wisconsin.
- March 17, 1910: Progressive Republicans in the United States House of Representatives allied with Democrats to remove speaker Joseph Gurney Cannon from the House Rules Committee and strip him of his power to appoint committee chairmen.
- September 1, 1910: Wisconsin Supreme Court justice Joshua Eric Dodge resigned from the court.
- September 10, 1910: Governor James O. Davidson appointed Wisconsin circuit judge Aad J. Vinje to the Wisconsin Supreme Court to replace Joshua Eric Dodge.
- November 8, 1910: 1910 Wisconsin elections:
  - Francis E. McGovern elected Governor of Wisconsin.
  - Wisconsin voters approved an amendment to the state constitution so that redistricting should only occur after a federal census.
  - Wisconsin voters rejected an amendment to the state constitution to double compensation for state legislators.
  - Wisconsin voters approved an amendment which would have enabled more state funding of public improvements, but the referendum was later ruled invalid by the Wisconsin Supreme Court.
- November 20, 1910: Francisco I. Madero called for an armed revolution against Mexican president/dictator Porfirio Díaz, initiating the Mexican Revolution.

== Major legislation ==
- Joint Resolution to amend section 21 of article 4 of the constitution, relating to compensation of members of the legislature, 1909 Joint Resolution 7. Second legislative passage of the proposed amendment to the state constitution to double compensation for state legislators. The amendment was rejected by voters in the 1910 election.
- Joint Resolution memorializing congress in regard to international peace, 1909 Joint Resolution 19. Endorsed the idea of an international parliament for preservation of peace.
- Joint Resolution relating to the capitol building, 1909 Joint Resolution 30. Requested that the city of Madison enact controls to reduce coal pollution to maintain the beauty of the new capitol building, which was then under construction.
- Joint Resolution to amend section 10, article VII of the constitution, relating to the salary of judges, 1909 Joint Resolution 34. Proposed an amendment to the state constitution to allow the Legislature to set judicial salaries by law.
- Joint Resolution to amend section 6, article VIII of the constitution, relating to limitation on the public debt, 1909 Joint Resolution 37. Proposed an amendment to the state constitution to expand the reasons for which cities or counties could incur debt, but requiring that a payment schedule would be implemented that would have the debt repaid within 50 years.
- Joint Resolution to amend article 11 of the constitution by adding thereto a new section to be known as Section 3a, relating to the acquisition of lands by the state or any of its cities for certain public purposes, 1909 Joint Resolution 38. Proposed an amendment to the state constitution to allow cities to acquire land for the purposes of creating or enlarging public parks, public squares, streets, public buildings, etc.
- Joint Resolution to amend section 3 of article XI of .the constitution, relating to municipal corporations and their indebtedness, 1909 Joint Resolution 44. Proposed an amendment to the state constitution to create an exemption to the 5% limit on municipal debt for municipalities larger than 150,000 people where the debt is being used for the purchase of land for public improvements.
- Joint Resolution providing an amendment to section 3 of article IV of the Constitution of the State of Wisconsin, relating to apportionment, 1909 Joint Resolution 55. Second legislative passage of the proposed amendment to the state constitution to only perform redistricting following a federal census. This amendment was ratified by voters in the Fall 1910 general election.

== Party summary ==
=== Senate summary ===
Senate partisan composition Democratic: 4 seats Social Dem.: 1 seat Republican: 28 seats

	Party (Shading indicates majority caucus)			Total	
	Dem.	S.D.	Rep.	Total	Vacant
End of previous Legislature	5	1	27	33	0
Start of 1st Session	4	1	28	33	0
Final voting share	15.15%		84.85%		
Beginning of the next Legislature	4	2	27	33	0

=== Assembly summary ===
Assembly partisan composition Democratic: 17 seats Social Dem.: 3 seats Republican: 80 seats

	Party (Shading indicates majority caucus)			Total	
	Dem.	S.D.	Rep.	Total	Vacant
End of previous Legislature	19	5	76	100	0
Start of 1st Session	17	3	80	100	0
From April 17, 1909 (Note: Republican Ferdinand Wittig (Brown 1st District) died April 17, 1909.)	17	3	79	99	1
Final voting share	20.2%		79.8%		
Beginning of the next Legislature	29	12	59	100	0

== Sessions ==
- 1st Regular session: January 13, 1909 – June 18, 1909

== Leaders ==
=== Senate leadership ===
- President of the Senate: William D. Connor (R)
- President pro tempore: James Huff Stout (R–Menomonie)

=== Assembly leadership ===
- Speaker of the Assembly: Levi H. Bancroft (R–Richland Center)

== Members ==
=== Members of the Senate ===
Members of the Senate for the Forty-Ninth Wisconsin Legislature:

Dist.	Counties	Senator	Residence	Party
01	Door, Kewaunee, & Marinette	Harlan P. Bird	Wausaukee	Rep.
02	Brown & Oconto	Timothy Burke	Green Bay	Rep.
03	Kenosha & Racine	Isaac T. Bishop	Somers	Rep.
04	Milwaukee (Northern Part)	Henry Bodenstab	Milwaukee	Rep.
05	Milwaukee (City Center)	Edward T. Fairchild	Milwaukee	Rep.
06	Milwaukee (City Northwest)	Winfield R. Gaylord	Milwaukee	Soc.D.
07	Milwaukee (Southern & Western County)	George E. Page	Milwaukee	Rep.
08	Milwaukee (City South)	John C. Kleczka	Milwaukee	Rep.
09	Adams, Marquette, Waushara, & Wood	Theodore W. Brazeau	Grand Rapids	Rep.
10	Pierce & St. Croix	Walter C. Owen	Maiden Rock	Rep.
11	Burnett, Douglas, & Polk	George Hudnall	Superior	Rep.
12	Ashland, Bayfield, Price, Sawyer, Taylor, & Washburn	Albert W. Sanborn	Ashland	Rep.
13	Dodge	Paul O. Husting	Mayville	Dem.
14	Outagamie & Shawano	J. Elmer Lehr	Appleton	Rep.
15	Calumet & Manitowoc	Samuel W. Randolph	Manitowoc	Dem.
16	Crawford & Grant	John J. Blaine	Boscobel	Rep.
17	Green, Iowa, & Lafayette	Harry C. Martin	Darlington	Rep.
18	Fond du Lac & Green Lake	Edward H. Lyons	Fond du Lac	Rep.
19	Winnebago	John A. Fridd		Rep.
20	Ozaukee & Sheboygan	Henry Krumrey	Plymouth	Rep.
21	Portage & Waupaca	Edward E. Browne	Waupaca	Rep.
22	Rock	John M. Whitehead	Janesville	Rep.
23	Jefferson & Walworth	John A. Hazelwood	Jefferson	Dem.
24	Chippewa, Eau Claire, & Rusk	John W. Thomas	Chippewa Falls	Rep.
25	Clark & Marathon	Spencer M. Marsh	Neillsville	Rep.
26	Dane	John S. Donald	Mount Horeb	Rep.
27	Columbia & Sauk	Charles L. Pearson	Greenfield	Dem.
28	Richland, & Vernon	David G. James	Richland Center	Rep.
29	Barron, Buffalo, Dunn, & Pepin	James H. Stout	Menomonie	Rep.
30	Florence, Forest, Iron, Langlade, Lincoln, Oneida, & Vilas	James A. Wright	Merrill	Rep.
31	Jackson, Juneau, & Monroe	H. W. Barker	Sparta	Rep.
32	La Crosse & Trempealeau	Thomas Morris	La Crosse	Rep.
33	Washington & Waukesha	Henry Lockney	Waukesha	Rep.

=== Members of the Assembly ===
Members of the Assembly for the Forty-Ninth Wisconsin Legislature:

Senate District	County	Dist.	Representative	Party	Residence
09	Adams & Marquette		Frank J. Kimball	Rep.	Briggsville
12	Ashland		John C. Chapple	Rep.	Ashland
29	Barron		George E. Scott	Rep.	Prairie Farm
12	Bayfield, Sawyer, & Washburn		Frank Hammill	Rep.	Spooner
02	Brown	1	Ferdinand Wittig	Rep.	Green Bay
02	Brown	2	Lewis W. Peterson	Rep.	
29	Buffalo & Pepin		C. A. Ingram	Rep.	Durand
11	Burnett & Polk		Axel Johnson	Rep.	Apple River
15	Calumet		Henry Rollmann	Dem.	Chilton
24	Chippewa & Rusk	1	Clarence B. Culbertson	Rep.	Stanley
24	Chippewa & Rusk	2	Arnt Erickson	Rep.	New Auburn
25	Clark		Charles M. Bradford	Rep.	
27	Columbia	1	James S. Towers	Rep.	Caledonia
27	Columbia	2	Elmer E. Haight	Rep.	Lowville
16	Crawford		George T. Atwood	Rep.	Gays Mills
26	Dane	1	Frank Smith	Rep.	Madison
26	Dane	2	Otto Onstad	Rep.	Christiana
26	Dane	3	Thomas A. Stewart	Dem.	Verona
13	Dodge	1	Charles Lentz	Dem.	Herman
13	Dodge	2	John F. Hughes	Dem.	Reeseville
01	Door		Thomas Reynolds	Rep.	Jacksonport
11	Douglas	1	James S. Stack	Rep.	Superior
11	Douglas	2	Walter D. Egan	Rep.	Superior
29	Dunn		D. C. Coolidge	Rep.	
24	Eau Claire	1	Henry Laycock	Rep.	Eau Claire
24	Eau Claire	2	Charles H. Daub	Rep.	Washington
30	Florence, Forest, & Langlade		William Reader	Rep.	Peck
18	Fond du Lac	1	Christian Pickart	Dem.	Marshfield
18	Fond du Lac	2	James Fenelon	Rep.	Ripon
16	Grant	1	Allen Wells	Rep.	
16	Grant	2	Henry Roethe	Rep.	Fennimore
17	Green		A. B. Comstock	Rep.	Albany
18	Green Lake		Christian C. Wellensgard	Rep.	Berlin
17	Iowa		Platt Whitman	Rep.	Highland
30	Iron, Oneida, & Vilas		Daniel B. Stevens	Rep.	Rhinelander
31	Jackson		Merlin Hull	Rep.	Black River Falls
23	Jefferson	1	C. F. Viebahn	Dem.	Watertown
23	Jefferson	2	George W. Kindlin	Dem.	Koshkonong
31	Juneau		H. J. Mortensen	Rep.	New Lisbon
03	Kenosha		Walker M. Curtiss	Rep.	Salem
01	Kewaunee		Moses Shaw	Rep.	Ahnapee
32	La Crosse	1	John E. McConnell	Rep.	La Crosse
32	La Crosse	2	E. J. Kneen	Dem.	Bangor
17	Lafayette		M. J. Cleary	Rep.	Blanchardville
30	Lincoln		F. W. Kubasta	Rep.	Merrill
15	Manitowoc	1	Simon F. Wehrwein	Rep.	Newton
15	Manitowoc	2	Lawrence W. Ledvina	Rep.	Two Rivers
25	Marathon	1	Nicholas Schmidt	Dem.	Marathon City
25	Marathon	2	August F. Marquardt	Rep.	Wausau
01	Marinette	1	Edward W. LeRoy	Rep.	Marinette
01	Marinette	2	Peter M. Nelson	Rep.	Beaver
04	Milwaukee	1	John T. Farrell	Dem.	Milwaukee
05	Milwaukee	2	Otto Harrass	Rep.	Milwaukee
07	Milwaukee	3	William Disch	Rep.	Milwaukee
05	Milwaukee	4	Carl H. Dorner	Rep.	Milwaukee
08	Milwaukee	5	M. W. Kalaher	Dem.	Milwaukee
05	Milwaukee	6	Thomas F. Ramsey	Dem.	Milwaukee
07	Milwaukee	7	George G. Brew	Rep.	Wauwatosa
08	Milwaukee	8	Fred R. Zimmerman	Rep.	Milwaukee
06	Milwaukee	9	Edmund J. Berner	Soc.D.	Milwaukee
06	Milwaukee	10	Herman Georgi	Rep.	Milwaukee
08	Milwaukee	11	Frederick Brockhausen	Soc.D.	Milwaukee
06	Milwaukee	12	Carl Busacker	Rep.	Milwaukee
04	Milwaukee	13	Charles E. Estabrook	Rep.	Milwaukee
07	Milwaukee	14	Joseph Domachowski	Dem.	Milwaukee
04	Milwaukee	15	Peter F. Leuch	Rep.	Milwaukee
06	Milwaukee	16	Frank J. Weber	Soc.D.	Milwaukee
31	Monroe		John R. Jones	Rep.	Leon
02	Oconto		John Grosse	Rep.	
14	Outagamie	1	Clinton B. Ballard	Rep.	Grand Chute
14	Outagamie	2	Peter Philipps	Rep.	Kaukauna
20	Ozaukee		William J. Bichler	Dem.	Belgium
10	Pierce		William A. Kay	Rep.	Martell
21	Portage		Orestes A. Crowell	Rep.	Almond
12	Price & Taylor		Elias L. Urquhart	Rep.	Medford
03	Racine	1	Wallace Ingalls	Rep.	Racine
03	Racine	2	John H. Kamper	Rep.	Raymond
28	Richland		Levi H. Bancroft	Rep.	Richland Center
22	Rock	1	Lawrence C. Whittet	Rep.	Edgerton
22	Rock	2	Grant U. Fisher	Rep.	Janesville
22	Rock	3	Simon Smith	Rep.	Beloit
27	Sauk	1	Virgil H. Cady	Dem.	Baraboo
27	Sauk	2	Silas A. Towne	Dem.	La Valle
14	Shawano		Benjamin A. Cady	Rep.	Birnamwood
20	Sheboygan	1	Edward J. Kempf	Rep.	Sheboygan
20	Sheboygan	2	Edward J. Keyes	Rep.	Lyndon
10	St. Croix		John A. Chinnock	Rep.	Troy
32	Trempealeau		Albert Twesme	Rep.	Galesville
28	Vernon		David F. Mains	Rep.	Viroqua
23	Walworth		Edwin Kull	Rep.	Bloomfield
33	Washington		Henry V. Schwalbach	Dem.	Germantown
33	Waukesha	1	James E. Thomas	Rep.	Waukesha
33	Waukesha	2	George E. Hoyt	Rep.	Menomonee Falls
21	Waupaca	1	Wesley Irvine	Rep.	
21	Waupaca	2	Ole A. Buslett	Rep.	Harrison
09	Waushara		Emil Keup	Rep.	Mount Morris
19	Winnebago	1	William M. Bray	Rep.	Oshkosh
19	Winnebago	2	James R. Barnett	Rep.	Neenah
19	Winnebago	3	Charles Neitzel	Rep.	Nekimi
09	Wood		George Hambrecht	Rep.	Grand Rapids

== Committees ==
=== Senate committees ===
- Senate Committee on Agriculture – I. T. Bishop, chair
- Senate Committee on Banks and Insurance – W. C. Owen, chair
- Senate Committee on Education – J. H. Stout, chair
- Senate Committee on Elections – H. C. Martin, chair
- Senate Committee on Engrossed Bills – T. Burke, chair
- Senate Committee on Federal Relations – E. E. Lyons, chair
- Senate Committee on the Judiciary – A. W. Sanborn, chair
- Senate Committee on Legislative Expenditures and Employees – T. Morris, chair
- Senate Committee on Manufacturers and Labor – T. W. Brazeau, chair
- Senate Committee on Military Affairs – D. G. James, chair
- Senate Committee on Public Health – H. W. Barker, chair
- Senate Committee on Roads and Bridges – E. E. Browne, chair
- Senate Committee on State Affairs – G. E. Page, chair
- Senate Committee on Taxation – J. M. Whitehead, chair
- Senate Committee on Towns and Counties – J. A. Fridd, chair
- Senate Committee on Transportation – H. M. Lockney, chair
- Senate Committee on Villages and Cities – J. A. Wright, chair

=== Assembly committees ===
- Assembly Committee on Agriculture – G. U. Fisher, chair
- Assembly Committee on Banks and Insurance – F. W. Kubasta, chair
- Assembly Committee on Cities – C. E. Estabrook, chair
- Assembly Committee on Dairy and Food – T. Reynolds, chair
- Assembly Committee on Dams – J. S. Stack, chair
- Assembly Committee on Education – S. F. Wehrwein, chair
- Assembly Committee on Elections – W. Ingalls, chair
- Assembly Committee on Engrossed Bills – H. E. Roethe, chair
- Assembly Committee on Federal Relations – C. B. Culbertson, chair
- Assembly Committee on the Judiciary – L W. Ledvina, chair
- Assembly Committee on Legislative Expenditures and Employees – J. E. Thomas, chair
- Assembly Committee on Libraries – D. B. Stevens, chair
- Assembly Committee on Lumber and Mining – P. Whitman, chair
- Assembly Committee on Manufactures and Labor – S. Smith, chair
- Assembly Committee on Military Affairs – W. Disch, chair
- Assembly Committee on Public Health – W. Irvine, chair
- Assembly Committee on Public Improvements – H. Laycock, chair
- Assembly Committee on Roads and Bridges – C. C. Wellensgard, chair
- Assembly Committee on State Affairs – G. E. Scott, chair
- Assembly Committee on Taxation – M. J. Cleary, chair
- Assembly Committee on Third Reading – W. Reader, chair
- Assembly Committee on Towns and Counties – J. C. Chapple, chair
- Assembly Committee on Transportation – E. W. LeRoy, chair
- Assembly Committee on Villages – G. T. Atwood, chair

=== Joint committees ===
- Joint Committee on the Capitol – J. S. Donald (Sen.) & F. Smith (Asm.), co-chairs
- Joint Committee on Charitable and Penal Institutions – S. M. Marsh (Sen.) & J. R. Jones (Asm.), co-chairs
- Joint Committee on Claims – G. B. Hudnall (Sen.) & L. C. Whittet (Asm.), co-chairs
- Joint Committee on Enrolled Bills – J. C. Kleczka (Sen.) & F. R. Zimmerman (Asm.), co-chairs
- Joint Committee on Fish and Game – J. W. Thomas (Sen.) & F. Hammill (Asm.), co-chairs
- Joint Committee on Forestry – H. P. Bird (Sen.) & W. M. Bray (Asm.), co-chairs
- Joint Committee on Printing – J. E. Lehr (Sen.) & J. A. Chinnock (Asm.), co-chairs
- Joint Committee on Revision – J. J. Blaine (Sen.) & J. E. McConnell (Asm.), co-chairs
- Joint Committee on Rules – J. H. Stout (Sen.) & F. J. Kimball (Asm.), co-chairs
- Joint Committee on State Departments – H. Krumrey (Sen.) & D. C. Coolidge (Asm.), co-chairs
- Special Joint Committee on Apportionment – J. M. Whitehead (Sen.) & C. A. Ingram (Asm.), co-chairs

== Employees ==
=== Senate employees ===
- Chief Clerk: F. E. Andrews
  - Journal Clerk: R. E. Smith
    - Assistant Journal Clerk: George M. McLaughlin
  - Bookkeeper: Fred M. Wylie
    - Assistant Bookkeeper: J. T. Huntington
  - Engrossing Clerk: John Bessey
  - Index Clerk: C. A. Worth
  - Proofreaders:
    - J. H. Frazier
    - L. B. Wolfenson
  - Stenographers:
    - J. H. Sapiro
    - R. H. Hillyer
    - A. W. Galloway
    - F. W. Spencer
    - C. E. Mullen
    - Fred Onstad
    - C. B. MacCrossen
    - R. W. Schlegel
  - Typewriter Clerks:
    - L. B. Webster
    - O. P. Peterson
    - W. A. Anderson
    - C. R. Welton
- Sergeant-at-Arms: Russell C. Falconer
  - Assistant Sergeant-at-Arms: T. H. Sanderson
  - Document Clerk: Elmer A. Pierce
  - Day Police: Olaf Goldsbrand
  - Night Police: F. E. Boyle
  - Laborer: John Eastman
- Postmaster: George Emerich
  - Messengers:
    - E. G. Cooper
    - Leon Grane
    - Thomas Farley
    - Roland Monroe
    - Orville Swarthout
    - Harry Cotey
    - Myron Harshaw

=== Assembly employees ===
- Chief Clerk: C. E. Shaffer
  - Journal Clerk: W. W. Jones
    - Assistant Journal Clerk: S. E. Pearson
  - Bookkeeper: S. S. Summers
    - Assistant Bookkeeper: C. H. Dietz
  - General Clerks:
    - W. J. Goldschmidt
    - R. E. Van Matre
  - Index Clerk: William L. Bullock
  - Proofreaders and Enrolling Clerks:
    - Max Schoetz
    - E. V. Nevins
  - Stenographers:
    - March Polk
    - A. J. Nelson
    - A. J. Hughes
    - D. J. Saposs
    - L. T. Pond
    - A. C. Tretow
    - A. A. Heinrich
    - C. J. Hartley
    - A. C. Sheperd
    - H. G. Pickering
    - F. Robotka
    - W. A. Lawton
  - Statistical Stenographer: George Washington Blanchard
  - Typewriters:
    - L. L. Oeland
    - J. C. Hawker
    - H. G. Lee
    - W. E. Kirk
- Sergeant-at-Arms: William S. Irvine
  - Assistant Sergeant-at-Arms: Harry V. Ross
  - Document Room Custodian: E. A. Hanks
    - Assistant Document Room Custodian: C. E. Nelson
  - Day Police: E. F. Wright
  - Night Watch: H. S. Stevenson
  - Night Laborer: E. Brackenwogen
- Postmaster: R. W. Cheever
  - Post Office Messenger: C. F. Puls
  - Messengers:
    - Francis Lamb
    - Harry E. Boyle
    - H. Hawker
    - A. B. Bonde
    - A. L. Vogt
    - Walter F. Vanderhyden
    - Harry E. Benedict
    - Frank J. Rief
    - Lawrence Stoddard
    - M. A. Goldberg
    - Julius Hembre
    - Paul E. Slawson
    - J. A. Jerabeck
    - H. O. Femrite
