= Brooklyn, Green Lake County, Wisconsin =

Brooklyn, Wisconsin
- Town
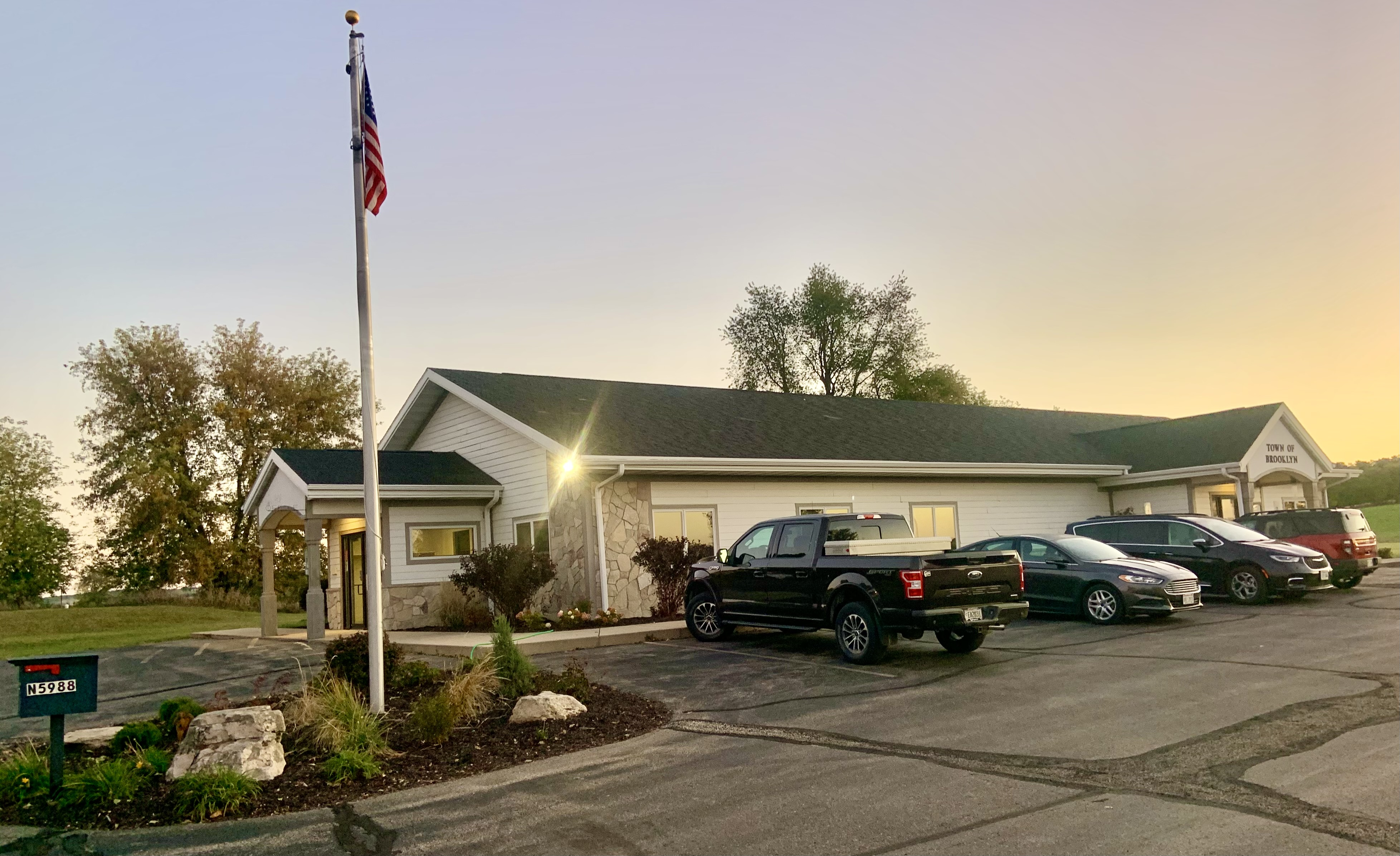
- Town hall

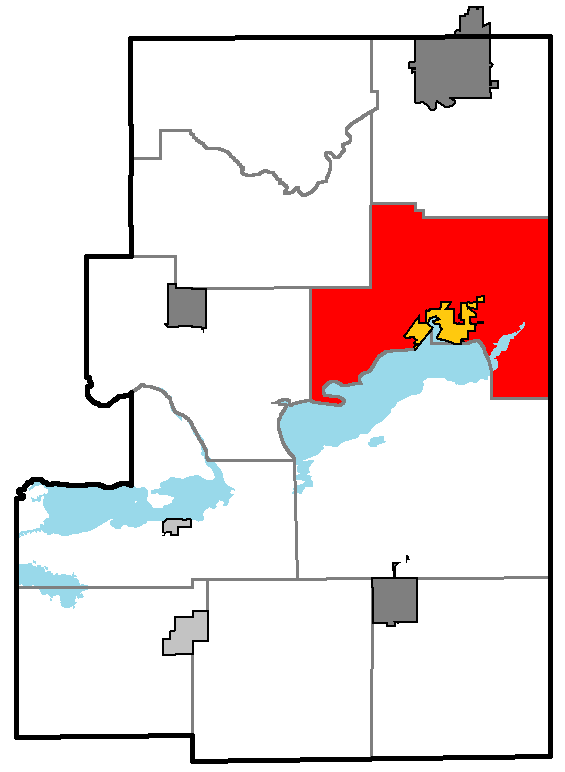
- Location of Brooklyn, Wisconsin

- Location of Green Lake County, Wisconsin
- Coordinates: 43°50′31″N 88°58′28″W
- Country: United States
- State: Wisconsin
- County: Green Lake

Area
  - Total: 47.3 sq mi (122.4 km^{2})
  - Land: 35.4 sq mi (91.8 km^{2})
  - Water: 11.8 sq mi (30.6 km^{2})
- Elevation: 797 ft (243 m)

Population (2020)
  - Total: 1,787
  - Density: 50.4/sq mi (19.5/km^{2})
- Time zone: UTC-6 (Central (CST))
  - Summer (DST): UTC-5 (CDT)
- Area code: 920
- FIPS code: 55-10125
- GNIS feature ID: 1582871
- Website: https://tn.brooklyn.wi.gov/

Brooklyn is a town in Green Lake County, Wisconsin, United States. The population was 1,787 at the 2020 census. The unincorporated communities of Pleasant Point and Sherwood Forest are located in the town.

== History ==
At its settlement, the town was called "Lexington". When the town was organized January 10, 1849, the name was changed to "Arcade". In the winter of 1850, the name was again changed to its present-day name of Brooklyn.

== Geography ==
According to the United States Census Bureau, the town has a total area of 47.2 square miles (122.4 km^{2}), of which 35.4 square miles (91.8 km^{2}) is land and 11.8 square miles (30.6 km^{2}) (24.99%) is water.

== Demographics ==
As of the census of 2000, there were 1,904 people, 794 households, and 575 families residing in the town. The population density was 53.7 people per square mile (20.7/km^{2}). There were 1,056 housing units at an average density of 29.8 per square mile (11.5/km^{2}). The racial makeup of the town was 98.84% White, 0.11% Native American, 0.32% Asian, 0.37% from other races, and 0.37% from two or more races. Hispanic or Latino of any race were 1.00% of the population.

There were 794 households, out of which 28.1% had children under the age of 18 living with them, 65.2% were married couples living together, 5.0% had a female householder with no husband present, and 27.5% were non-families. 22.3% of all households were made up of individuals, and 10.2% had someone living alone who was 65 years of age or older. The average household size was 2.40 and the average family size was 2.82.

In the town, the population was spread out, with 22.1% under the age of 18, 4.8% from 18 to 24, 25.7% from 25 to 44, 30.0% from 45 to 64, and 17.3% who were 65 years of age or older. The median age was 44 years. For every 100 females, there were 102.8 males. For every 100 females age 18 and over, there were 98.3 males.

The median income for a household in the town was $51,250, and the median income for a family was $55,134. Males had a median income of $35,327 versus $23,365 for females. The per capita income for the town was $24,174. About 2.2% of families and 3.5% of the population were below the poverty line, including 4.8% of those under age 18 and 0.6% of those age 65 or over.

== Notable people ==
- Fred E. Soper, Wisconsin State Representative and farmer, was born in the town
