= Union Grove, Wisconsin =

- Village
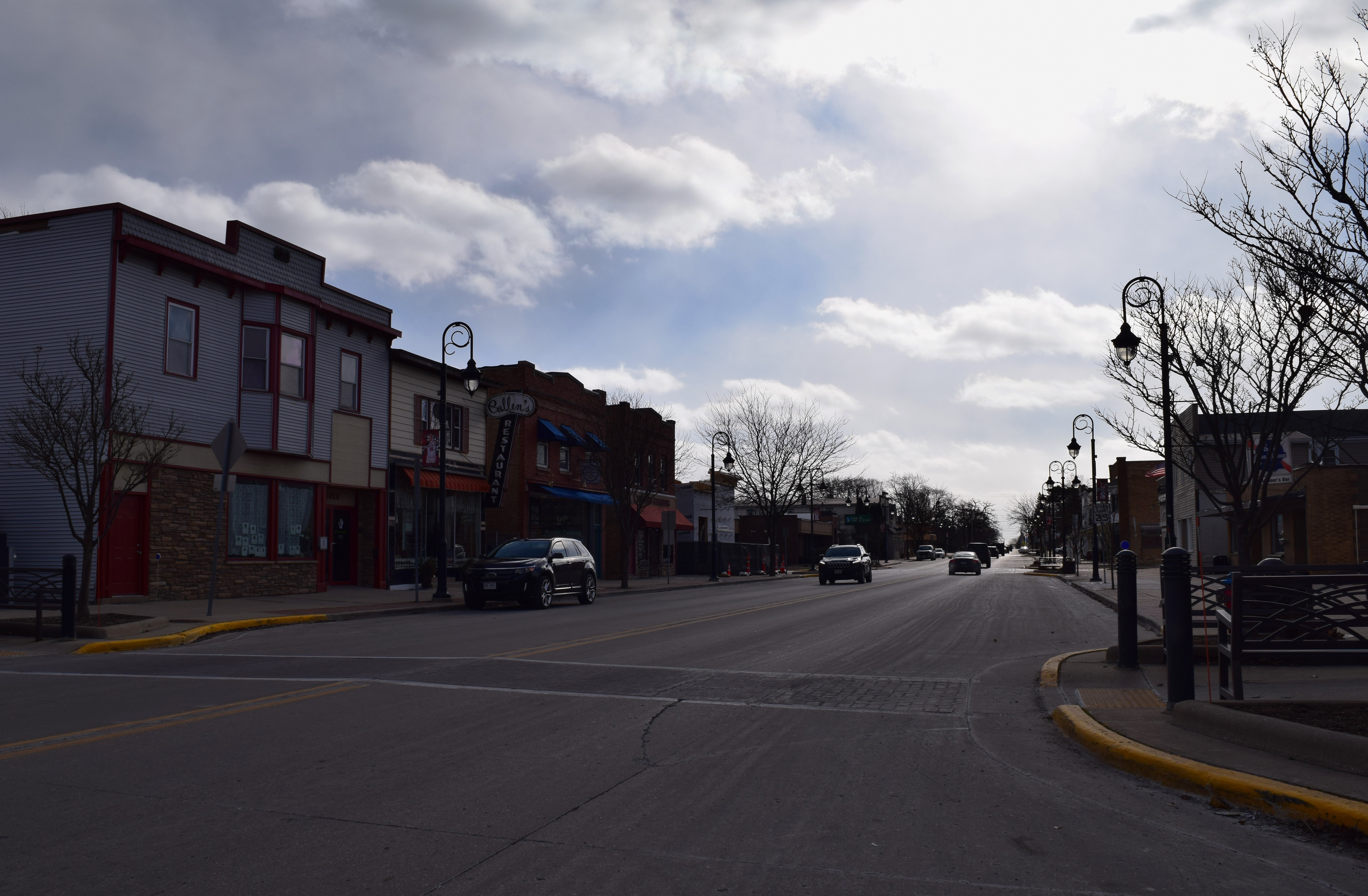
- Downtown Union Grove

- Location of Union Grove in Racine County, Wisconsin.
- Coordinates: 42°41′7″N 88°2′58″W
- Country: United States
- State: Wisconsin
- County: Racine
- Established: 1838

Government
  - Type: Village Board

Area
  - Total: 2.59 sq mi (6.72 km^{2})
  - Land: 2.59 sq mi (6.72 km^{2})
  - Water: 0 sq mi (0.00 km^{2})
- Elevation: 774 ft (236 m)

Population (2020)
  - Total: 4,915
  - Density: 1,969.5/sq mi (760.44/km^{2})
- Time zone: UTC-6 (Central (CST))
  - Summer (DST): UTC-5 (CDT)
- ZIP Code: 53182
- Area code: 262
- FIPS code: 55-81775
- GNIS feature ID: 1575902
- Website: www.uniongrovewi.gov

Union Grove is a village in Racine County, Wisconsin, United States. The population was 4,806 at the 2020 census.

== Etymology ==
Governor Henry Dodge named the area that became Union Grove, combining the word “Union” with “Grove” because of the gorgeous grove of burr oak trees on the west side of the land.

== Geography ==
Union Grove is located at 42°41′7″N 88°2′58″W (42.685287, -88.049390).

According to the United States Census Bureau, the village has a total area of 2.47 square miles (6.40 km^{2}), all land.

=== Climate ===
Climate data for Union Grove, Wisconsin (1991–2020)
Month	Jan	Feb	Mar	Apr	May	Jun	Jul	Aug	Sep	Oct	Nov	Dec	Year
Mean daily maximum °F (°C)	28.1 (−2.2)	31.9 (−0.1)	43.1 (6.2)	54.8 (12.7)	66.4 (19.1)	76.3 (24.6)	80.9 (27.2)	78.9 (26.1)	72.4 (22.4)	59.8 (15.4)	45.4 (7.4)	33.5 (0.8)	56.0 (13.3)
Daily mean °F (°C)	19.9 (−6.7)	23.5 (−4.7)	33.8 (1.0)	44.7 (7.1)	55.9 (13.3)	66.0 (18.9)	70.7 (21.5)	68.6 (20.3)	61.3 (16.3)	49.4 (9.7)	36.8 (2.7)	25.9 (−3.4)	46.4 (8.0)
Mean daily minimum °F (°C)	11.7 (−11.3)	15.1 (−9.4)	24.5 (−4.2)	34.5 (1.4)	45.4 (7.4)	55.6 (13.1)	60.6 (15.9)	58.3 (14.6)	50.3 (10.2)	39.0 (3.9)	28.1 (−2.2)	18.3 (−7.6)	36.8 (2.7)
Average precipitation inches (mm)	1.76 (45)	1.48 (38)	2.10 (53)	3.51 (89)	4.13 (105)	4.50 (114)	3.54 (90)	3.82 (97)	3.39 (86)	2.94 (75)	2.38 (60)	1.73 (44)	35.28 (896)
Average snowfall inches (cm)	13.0 (33)	11.0 (28)	4.9 (12)	1.7 (4.3)	0.0 (0.0)	0.0 (0.0)	0.0 (0.0)	0.0 (0.0)	0.0 (0.0)	0.1 (0.25)	2.1 (5.3)	7.7 (20)	40.5 (102.85)
Source: NOAA

== Demographics ==
Historical population
Census	Pop.	Note	%±
1880	412		—
1890	432		4.9%
1900	520		20.4%
1910	616		18.5%
1920	729		18.3%
1930	755		3.6%
1940	971		28.6%
1950	1,358		39.9%
1960	1,970		45.1%
1970	2,703		37.2%
1980	3,517		30.1%
1990	3,669		4.3%
2000	4,322		17.8%
2010	4,915		13.7%
2020	4,806		−2.2%

=== 2010 census ===
As of the census of 2010, there were 4,915 people, 1,881 households, and 1,269 families living in the village. The population density was 1,989.9 inhabitants per square mile (768.3/km^{2}). There were 1,960 housing units at an average density of 793.5 per square mile (306.4/km^{2}). The racial makeup of the village was 96.6% European American, 0.5% African American, 0.3% Native American, 0.6% Asian, 0.5% from other races, and 1.5% from two or more races. Hispanic or Latino of any race were 3.2% of the population.

There were 1,881 households, of which 37.7% had children under the age of 18 living with them, 48.5% were married couples living together, 13.4% had a female householder with no husband present, 5.6% had a male householder with no wife present, and 32.5% were non-families. 27.3% of all households were made up of individuals, and 9.7% had someone living alone who was 65 years of age or older. The average household size was 2.51 and the average family size was 3.06.

The median age in the village was 37.4 years. 26.2% of residents were under the age of 18; 8.2% were between the ages of 18 and 24; 26.3% were from 25 to 44; 27.3% were from 45 to 64; and 12% were 65 years of age or older. The gender makeup of the village was 48.5% male and 51.5% female.

=== 2000 census ===
At the 2000 census, there were 4,322 people, 1,631 households and 1,143 families living in the village. The population density was 2,525.0 per square mile (975.9/km^{2}). There were 1,677 housing units at an average density of 979.7 per square mile (378.7/km^{2}). The racial makeup of the village was 97.20% White, 0.28% African American, 0.21% Native American, 0.72% Asian, 0.42% from other races, and 1.18% from two or more races. Hispanic or Latino of any race were 2.36% of the population.

There were 1,631 households, of which 38.1% had children under the age of 18 living with them, 53.0% were married couples living together, 12.6% had a female householder with no husband present, and 29.9% were non-families. 23.7% of all households were made up of individuals, and 8.9% had someone living alone who was 65 years of age or older. The average household size was 2.60 and the average family size was 3.10.

28.6% of the population were under the age of 18, 8.9% from 18 to 24, 32.2% from 25 to 44, 18.6% from 45 to 64, and 11.8% who were 65 years of age or older. The median age was 34 years. For every 100 females, there were 90.9 males. For every 100 females age 18 and over, there were 87.6 males.

The median household income was $50,636 and the median family income was $57,453. Males had a median income of $38,239 versus $25,263 for females. The per capita income was $20,445. About 4.6% of families and 5.4% of the population were below the poverty line, including 6.5% of those under age 18 and 8.7% of those age 65 or over.

== Education ==
- Union Grove Elementary School
- Union Grove Union High School
- Union Grove Christian School (PreK-12)
- Shepherds College is a post-secondary school for students with intellectual disabilities founded in 2008.

== Public safety ==
Fire and EMS service are provided by the Union Grove-Yorkville Fire Department. Police services are provided by the Racine County Sheriffs Department.

== Transportation ==
Union Grove was a stop on the Racine & Southwestern branch line of the Chicago, Milwaukee, St. Paul and Pacific Railroad, better known as the Milwaukee Road. In its 1980 bankruptcy, the Milwaukee Road disposed of the Southwestern Line. Today the line from Sturtevant through Union Grove to Kansasville is operated by CP Rail. This line has been sold and plans have been made to create a bike path over the old railroad path. However, this has not come to fruition, as of 2020.

== Notable people ==
- Mark Dice, Author, Conservative political commentator, Conspiracy theorist, and YouTuber.
- Vilnis Ezerins, NFL player, attended high school in Union Grove.
- Clifford R. Goldsworthy, Wisconsin State Representative, farmer, and businessman, was born in Union Grove.
- John Nichols, progressive journalist
- James Vint, formerly a Socialist state legislator from Milwaukee, later moved to Union Grove and operated an 80-acre farm here, as well as managing the Farmers' Cooperative Elevator company
