= Concord, Wisconsin =

- Town
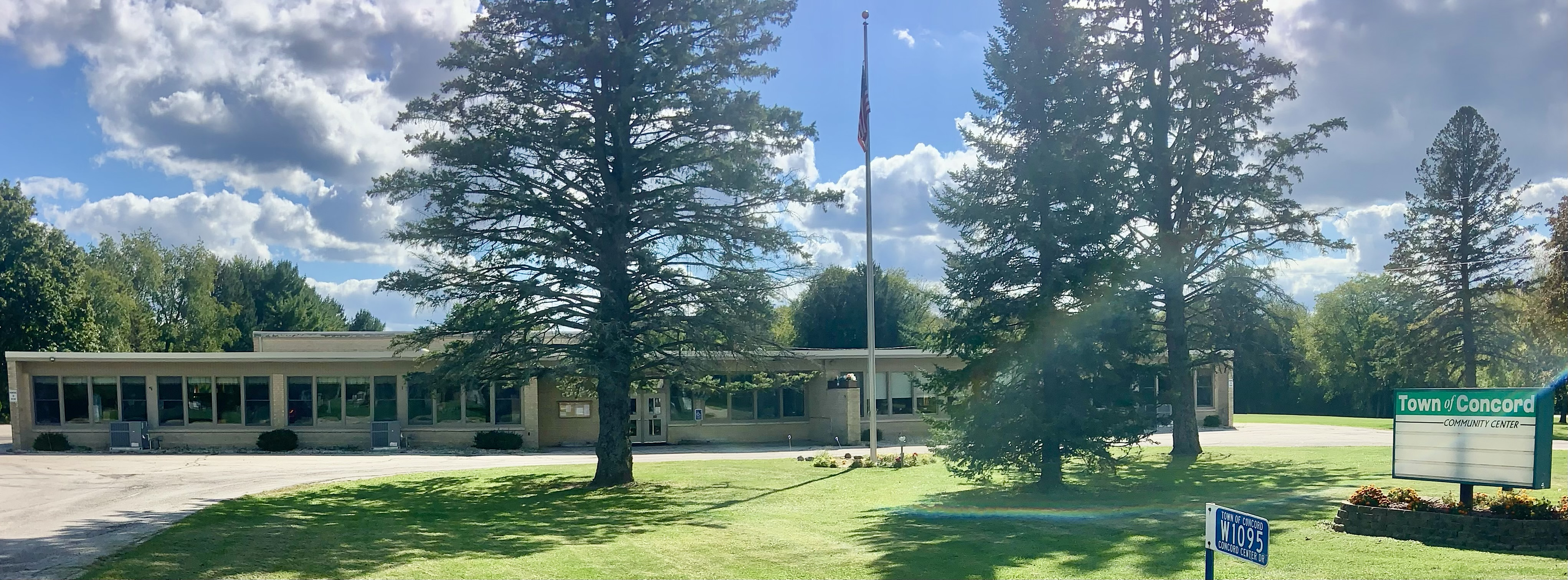
- Town hall

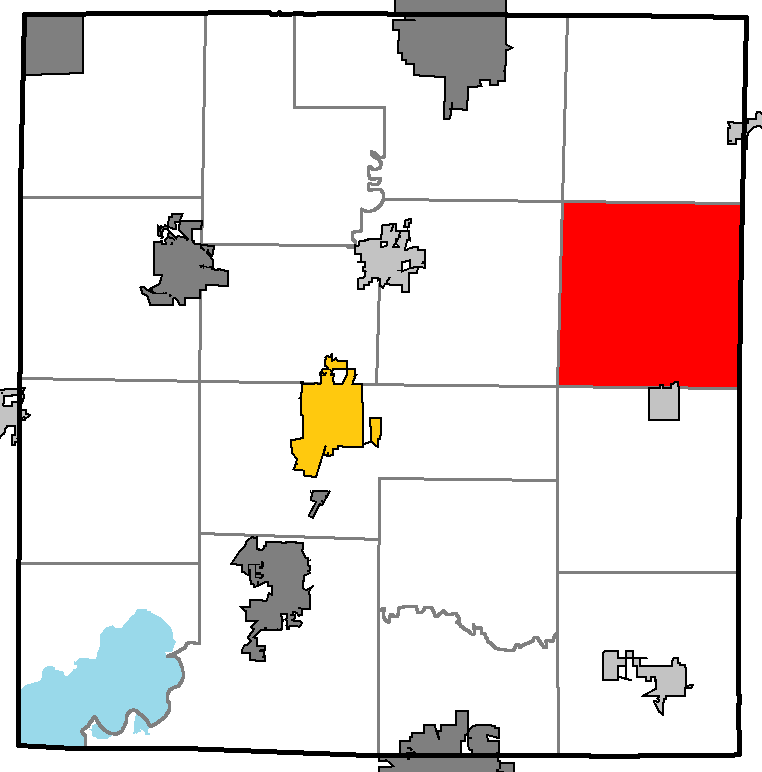
- Location of Concord, within Jefferson County

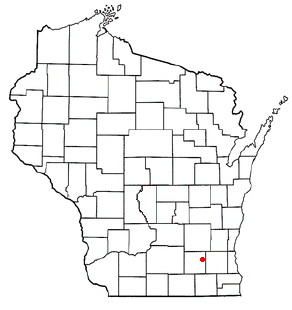
- Location of Concord, Wisconsin
- Coordinates: 43°3′50″N 88°35′19″W
- Country: United States
- State: Wisconsin
- County: Jefferson

Area
  - Total: 36.5 sq mi (94.5 km^{2})
  - Land: 35.9 sq mi (92.9 km^{2})
  - Water: 0.62 sq mi (1.6 km^{2})
- Elevation: 869 ft (265 m)

Population (2020)
  - Total: 1,981
  - Density: 55.2/sq mi (21.3/km^{2})
- Time zone: UTC-6 (Central (CST))
  - Summer (DST): UTC-5 (CDT)
- FIPS code: 55-16650
- GNIS feature ID: 1583009
- Website: concordwisconsin.org

Concord is a town in Jefferson County, Wisconsin, United States. The population was 1,981 at the 2020 census.

== Geography ==
According to the United States Census Bureau, the town has a total area of 36.5 square miles (94.5 km^{2}), of which 35.9 square miles (92.9 km^{2}) is land and 0.62 square miles (1.6 km^{2}), or 1.71%, is water.

== Demographics ==
As of the census of 2000, there were 2,023 people, 757 households, and 598 families residing in the town. The population density was 56.2 people per square mile (21.7/km^{2}). There were 770 housing units at an average density of 21.4 per square mile (8.3/km^{2}). The racial makeup of the town was 98.37% White, 0.10% Native American, 0.15% Asian, 0.49% from other races, and 0.89% from two or more races. Hispanic or Latino of any race were 1.09% of the population.

There were 757 households, out of which 31.3% had children under the age of 18 living with them, 70.4% were married couples living together, 5.0% had a female householder with no husband present, and 20.9% were non-families. 16.9% of all households were made up of individuals, and 6.1% had someone living alone who was 65 years of age or older. The average household size was 2.67 and the average family size was 3.01.

In the town, the population was spread out, with 24.1% under the age of 18, 6.2% from 18 to 24, 29.9% from 25 to 44, 28.0% from 45 to 64, and 11.8% who were 65 years of age or older. The median age was 39 years. For every 100 females, there were 103.9 males. For every 100 females age 18 and over, there were 104.8 males.

The median income for a household in the town was $52,885, and the median income for a family was $56,844. Males had a median income of $37,413 versus $26,061 for females. The per capita income for the town was $21,813. About 3.7% of families and 4.9% of the population were below the poverty line, including 2.9% of those under age 18 and 5.3% of those age 65 or over.

== History ==
The first non-Native American settlers in the region consisted entirely of settlers from New England as well as settlers from Upstate New York whose parents had moved to that region shortly after the American Revolution. These were "Yankee" settlers, meaning they were descended from the English Puritans who settled New England during the colonial era.

They were primarily members of the Congregational Church though due to the Second Great Awakening many of them had converted to Methodism and some had become Baptists before coming to what is now Jefferson County. The Congregational Church subsequently has gone through many divisions and some factions are now known as the Church of Christ, United Church of Christ and Church of God.

When the New England settlers arrived in what is now Concord there was nothing but a dense virgin forest and wild prairie. New Englanders and New England transplants from Upstate New York were the vast majority of Jefferson County's inhabitants during the first several decades of its history. As a result of this heritage Concord, Wisconsin was named after Concord, New Hampshire.

On February 1, 1860, Charles Ingalls married Caroline Quiner in Concord. Their daughter was Laura Ingalls Wilder, author of the Little House on the Prairie books.

== Notable people ==
- John A. Hazelwood, educator, lawyer and Wisconsin politician
- Austin Kellogg, farmer, sheriff and Wisconsin legislator
- John M. Sell, house painter and Wisconsin legislator
- George Weeks, farmer, sheriff, prison warden and Wisconsin legislator
