= Walter D. Egan =

American politician

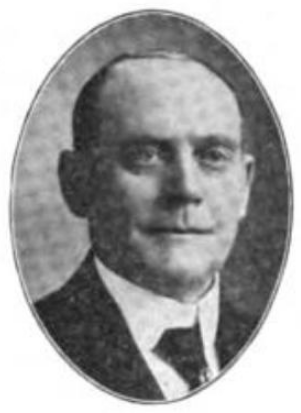

Member of the Wisconsin State Assembly
- In office 1908–1910
- Constituency: Douglas County Second District

Personal details
- Born: 1866 Chicago, Illinois
- Died: December 24, 1913 (aged 46–47) Superior, Wisconsin
- Party: Republican
- Occupation: Dockmaster, politician

Walter D. Egan (1866 – December 24, 1913) was a member of the Wisconsin State Assembly.

== Biography ==
Egan was born in Chicago, Illinois in 1866. Later, he married Margaret Carr. He died in Superior, Wisconsin on December 24, 1913.

== Career ==
Egan was elected to the Assembly in 1908. He was a Republican.
