= Vesper, Wisconsin =

- Village
- Location of Vesper in Wood County, Wisconsin.
- Coordinates: 44°28′52″N 89°58′3″W
- Country: United States
- State: Wisconsin
- County: Wood

Area
  - Total: 1.15 sq mi (2.99 km^{2})
  - Land: 1.15 sq mi (2.99 km^{2})
  - Water: 0 sq mi (0.00 km^{2})
- Elevation: 1,096 ft (334 m)

Population (2020)
  - Total: 513
  - Density: 444/sq mi (172/km^{2})
- Time zone: UTC-6 (Central (CST))
  - Summer (DST): UTC-5 (CDT)
- Zip code(s): 54489
- Area codes: 715 & 534
- FIPS code: 55-82650
- GNIS feature ID: 1576070
- Website: http://www.villageofvesper.com/

Vesper is a village in Wood County, Wisconsin, United States. The population was 513 at the 2020 census.

== History ==
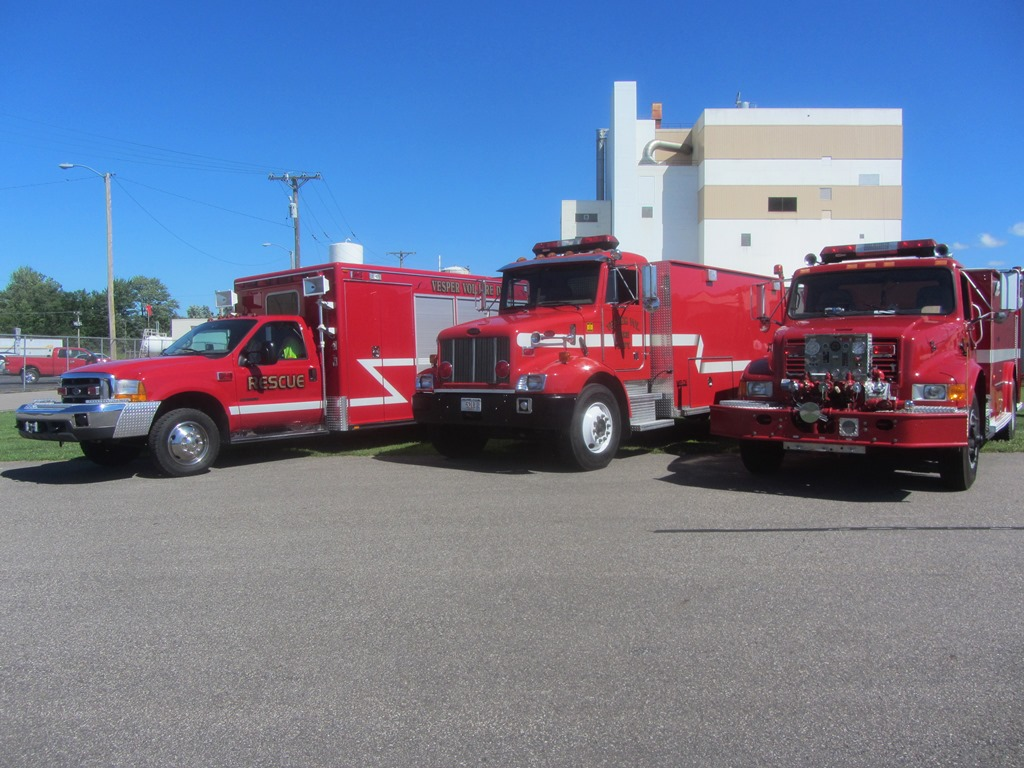
Vesper Vol. Fire Department

The village of Vesper began to form in the early 1850s with the first settlers. In the 1870's, Girard and Drake built a sawmill on Hemlock Creek to process lumber from the surrounding forests. Their firm also started a store and blacksmith shop. A post office opened in 1878. The first postmaster, James Cameron, sent a letter to the federal department naming new towns. A letter came back with the name "Vesper." The village was named after vesper sparrows native to the area. In 1894 a wildfire swept in from the woods and burned the mill, along with 23 houses on the west side of the creek.

After the fire, the surrounding stump-land was sold to farmers. The village of Vesper was on 100 acres now owned by Benson and Anderton. It was platted in 1897 by . Carsten Otto started a creamery in 1898. In 1902 John Murgatroyd & Sons started the Vesper Brick & Tile Factory, which operated until the start of WWI. A two-room brick school was built in 1906. In 1907 The Vesper Wood Manufacturing Company began making stave silos and watering tanks out of wood. The State Bank of Vesper opened in 1911. The village incorporated in 1948.

== Geography ==
Vesper is located at 44°28′52″N 89°58′3″W (44.481016, -89.967423).

According to the United States Census Bureau, the village has a total area of 1.16 square miles (3.00 km^{2}), all land.

== Demographics ==
Historical population
Census	Pop.	Note	%±
1950	342		—
1960	351		2.6%
1970	355		1.1%
1980	554		56.1%
1990	598		7.9%
2000	541		−9.5%
2010	584		7.9%
2020	513		−12.2%
U.S. Decennial Census

=== 2010 census ===
As of the census of 2010, there were 584 people, 246 households, and 160 families living in the village. The population density was 503.4 inhabitants per square mile (194.4/km^{2}). There were 264 housing units at an average density of 227.6 per square mile (87.9/km^{2}). The racial makeup of the village was 96.7% White, 0.7% Native American, 0.3% Asian, 0.2% from other races, and 2.1% from two or more races. Hispanic or Latino of any race were 1.0% of the population.

There were 246 households, of which 28.0% had children under the age of 18 living with them, 52.8% were married couples living together, 6.5% had a female householder with no husband present, 5.7% had a male householder with no wife present, and 35.0% were non-families. 26.8% of all households were made up of individuals, and 11.8% had someone living alone who was 65 years of age or older. The average household size was 2.37 and the average family size was 2.84.

The median age in the village was 36.4 years. 22.4% of residents were under the age of 18; 9.4% were between the ages of 18 and 24; 28% were from 25 to 44; 24.5% were from 45 to 64; and 15.6% were 65 years of age or older. The gender makeup of the village was 49.8% male and 50.2% female.

=== 2000 census ===
As of the census of 2000, there were 541 people, 234 households, and 153 families living in the village. The population density was 482.2 people per square mile (186.5/km^{2}). There were 243 housing units at an average density of 216.6 per square mile (83.8/km^{2}). The racial makeup of the village was 98.71% White, 0.18% Native American, 0.18% Asian, 0.18% from other races, and 0.74% from two or more races. Hispanic or Latino of any race were 0.74% of the population.

There were 234 households, out of which 29.5% had children under the age of 18 living with them, 52.6% were married couples living together, 10.3% had a female householder with no husband present, and 34.2% were non-families. 30.3% of all households were made up of individuals, and 14.5% had someone living alone who was 65 years of age or older. The average household size was 2.31 and the average family size was 2.88.

In the village, the population was spread out, with 25.0% under the age of 18, 6.8% from 18 to 24, 29.0% from 25 to 44, 23.3% from 45 to 64, and 15.9% who were 65 years of age or older. The median age was 39 years. For every 100 females, there were 90.5 males. For every 100 females age 18 and over, there were 89.7 males.

The median income for a household in the village was $38,750, and the median income for a family was $45,000. Males had a median income of $36,161 versus $20,833 for females. The per capita income for the village was $19,327. About 6.6% of families and 7.2% of the population were below the poverty line, including 7.6% of those under age 18 and 8.1% of those age 65 or over.

== Notable people ==
- Clifford R. Goldsworthy, Wisconsin State Representative, farmer, and businessman, lived in Vesper; Goldsworthy was the town chairman and postmaster in Vesper.
