= Peter Nelson (b. 1861) =

American politician

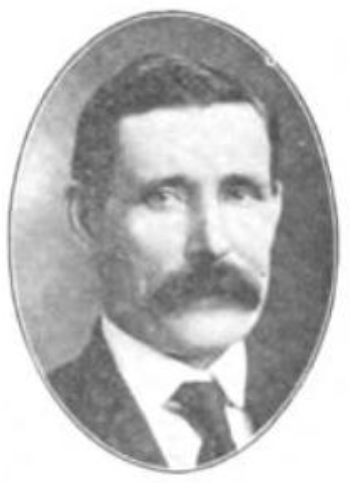

Member of the Wisconsin State Assembly
- In office 1908–1910
- Constituency: Marinette County Second District

Personal details
- Born: Peter M. Nelson; May 16, 1861 Tromsø, Norway
- Died: February 10, 1938 (aged 76) Beaver, Marinette County, Wisconsin
- Party: Republican
- Occupation: Farmer, politician

Peter M. Nelson (May 16, 1861 – February 10, 1938) was a member of the Wisconsin State Assembly. He was elected to the Assembly in 1908. Additionally, Nelson was Assessor of Coleman, Wisconsin and Chairman (similar to Mayor) and a member of the school board of Beaver, Marinette County, Wisconsin. He was a Republican. Nelson was born on May 16, 1861, in Tromsø, Norway.

He died at his home in Beaver on February 10, 1938.
