= Peter C. Anderson =

American politician

Peter C. Anderson was an American politician. He was a member of the Wisconsin State Assembly. Elected in 1906, he represented St. Croix County, Wisconsin. Anderson was also President (similar to Mayor) of the village of Hammond, Wisconsin. He was a Democrat.
