= Silas A. Towne =

American politician

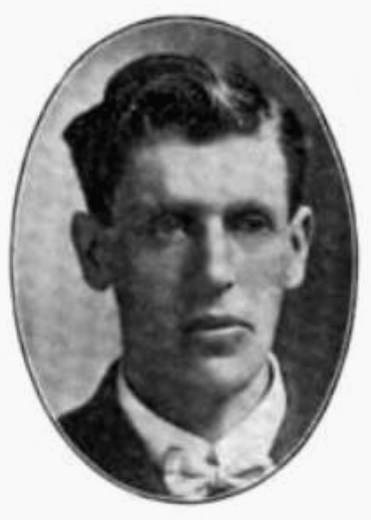

Member of the Wisconsin State Assembly
- In office 1908–1910
- Constituency: Sauk County Second District

Personal details
- Born: June 14, 1875 Greenwood, Vernon County, Wisconsin, US
- Died: February 15, 1966 (aged 90) Reedsburg, Wisconsin, US
- Party: Democratic
- Occupation: Teacher, farmer, politician

Silas A. Towne (June 14, 1875 – February 15, 1966) was a member of the Wisconsin State Assembly.

== Biography ==
Towne was born in Greenwood, Vernon County, Wisconsin in 1875; reports have differed on the exact date. He would become a schoolteacher before purchasing a farm in La Valle (town), Wisconsin in 1898. Towne died in Reedsburg on February 15, 1966.

== Political career ==
Towne was a member of the Assembly during the 1909 session. Other positions he held include town clerk of La Valle. He was a Democrat.
