= David L. Douglas =

American politician

David L. Douglas (1845 – 1913) was an American businessman, and politician.

Born in Scotland in 1845, Douglas emigrated to the United States in 1894 and settled in the city of Eau Claire. He was elected Mayor of Eau Claire in 1899. He was elected to the Wisconsin State Assembly in 1906. Douglas served as a trustee of the county asylum and was the originator of the street fairs in Eau Claire. He was one of the founders of the Eau Claire Gas Light Company. Douglas died in 1913.
