= F. W. Kubasta =

American politician

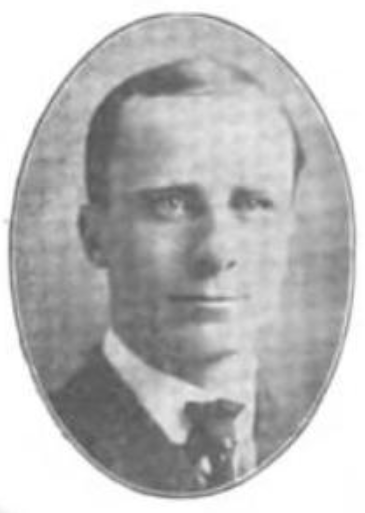

Member of the Wisconsin State Assembly
- Constituency: Lincoln County
- In office 1906–1910
- In office 1914–1916

Personal details
- Born: Frederick W. Kubasta; June 8, 1877 New Lisbon, Wisconsin
- Died: April 8, 1970 (aged 92) Rocky River, Ohio
- Party: Republican
- Spouse: Nanna Hals (m. 1905)
- Children: 2
- Occupation: Businessman, politician

Frederick W. Kubasta (June 8, 1877 – April 8, 1970) was a member of the Wisconsin State Assembly.

== Biography ==
Kubasta was born on June 8, 1877, in New Lisbon, Wisconsin. In 1882, he moved with his parents to Merrill, Wisconsin. On August 30, 1905, Kubasta married Nanna Hals. They had two children.

He died at his home in Rocky River, Ohio, on April 8, 1970.

== Career ==
Kubasta was a member of the Assembly during the 1907, 1909 and 1915 sessions. Additionally, he was Postmaster of Merrill and a member of the county board of supervisors and Chairman of the Republican county committee of Lincoln County, Wisconsin.
