= Edward H. Sprague =

American politician

Edward Harvey Sprague (June 8, 1848 – December 23, 1930) was a member of the Wisconsin State Assembly.

== Biography ==
Sprague was born on June 8, 1848, in Waterloo, Grant County, Wisconsin. He graduated from what is now the University of Wisconsin–Platteville in 1869 and the University of Wisconsin Law School in 1878. He married Linda J. Williams in 1871. Sprague died of heart failure in Milwaukee on December 23, 1930.

== Career ==
Sprague was elected to the Assembly in 1906. Other positions he held include District Attorney of Walworth County, Wisconsin. He was a Republican.

== Legacy ==
The Sprague Theatre in Elkhorn, Wisconsin, was named after Sprague.
