= Clifford R. Goldsworthy =

American politician

Clifford Russell Goldsworthy (September 30, 1865 – October 1, 1944) was an American farmer, businessman, and politician.

Born in Union Grove, Wisconsin, Goldsworthy went to Union Grove High School and then to Spencerian Business College in Milwaukee. Goldsworthy farmed in Kenosha County, and was in the real estate business. He then moved to Vesper, Wood County, Wisconsin, and continued in the real estate business. He was also in the merchandise business and had a sawmill. Goldsworthy was postmaster of Vesper and served as chairman of the town board. He also served on the Wood County Board of Supervisors. While living in Vesper, Goldsworthy served in the Wisconsin State Assembly in 1907. He was a Republican. In 1931, Goldsworthy moved back to Union Grove and then returned to Vesper. Goldsworthy died in a hospital in Madison, Wisconsin.
