= Elmore Elver =

American politician

Elmore Theodore Elver (March 4, 1877 – May 19, 1921) was an American politician and lawyer.

Born in the town of Vermont, Dane County, Wisconsin, Elver moved to Madison, Wisconsin and went to high school. Elver graduated from the University of Wisconsin in 1898, and from its College of Law in 1901. He practiced law in Madison, Wisconsin. In 1907, Elver served in the Wisconsin State Assembly and was a Democrat. He died in a hospital in Madison, Wisconsin from pneumonia.
