= Wesley Irvine =

American politician

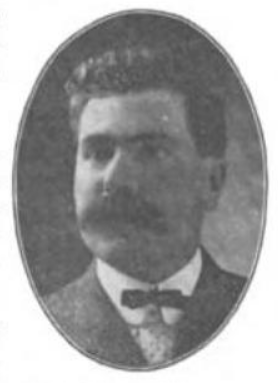

Member of the Wisconsin State Assembly
- In office 1906–1910
- Constituency: Waupaca County First District

Personal details
- Born: December 1866 Province of Canada
- Died: June 6, 1945 (aged 78) Madison, Wisconsin
- Party: Republican
- Education: University of Maryland School of Medicine
- Occupation: Physician, politician

Wesley Irvine (December 1866 – June 6, 1945) was a member of the Wisconsin State Assembly.

== Biography ==
Irvine was born in the Province of Canada in December 1866. He graduated from the University of Maryland School of Medicine in 1892.

He died in Madison on June 6, 1945.

== Career ==
Irvine was elected to the Assembly in 1906 and 1908. He was a Republican.
