= George W. Kindlin =

American politician

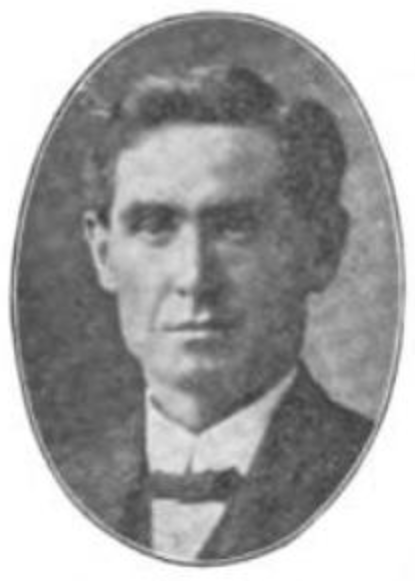

Member of the Wisconsin State Assembly
- In office 1906–1910
- Constituency: Jefferson County, Wisconsin

Personal details
- Born: September 11, 1868 Koshkonong, Wisconsin
- Died: May 12, 1920 (aged 51) Fort Atkinson, Wisconsin
- Party: Democratic
- Education: University of Wisconsin-Madison
- Occupation: Politician

George W. Kindlin (September 11, 1868 – May 12, 1920) was a member of the Wisconsin State Assembly.

== Biography ==
Kindlin was born on September 11, 1868, in Koshkonong, Wisconsin. He attended what is now the University of Wisconsin-Madison. Kindlin died on May 12, 1920. He was buried in Fort Atkinson, Wisconsin.

== Career ==
Kindlin was elected to the Assembly in 1906. Additionally, he was Clerk of Koshkonong and Surveyor of Jefferson County, Wisconsin. He was a Democrat.
