= Lawrence W. Ledvina =

American politician and lawyer

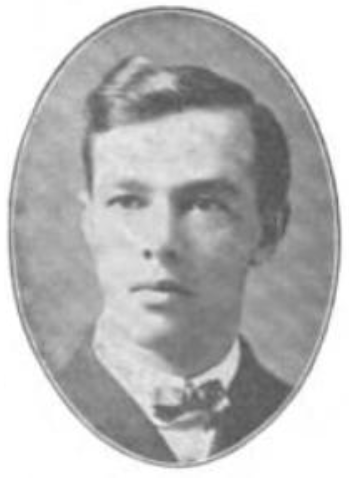

Member of the Wisconsin State Assembly
- In office 1904–1912
- Constituency: Manitowoc County Second District

Personal details
- Born: September 28, 1880 Kellnersville, Wisconsin
- Died: September 26, 1932 (aged 51) Manitowoc, Wisconsin
- Party: Republican
- Occupation: Lawyer, teacher, politician

Lawrence W. Ledvina (September 28, 1880 – September 26, 1932) was an American politician and lawyer.

== Early life, family and education ==
Lawrence Ledvina was born in Kellnersville, Wisconsin.

He graduated from University of Wisconsin Law School in 1906.

== Career ==
Ledvina taught school in Franklin, Manitowoc County, Wisconsin. After graduating from law school, he practiced law in Manitowoc and Two Rivers, Wisconsin. While still in law school, he was elected in 1904 to the Wisconsin State Assembly, serving from 1905 to 1911. He was a Republican.

He served in the United States Navy during World War I. Ledvina helped organize the State Bank of Manitowoc.

== Personal life and demise ==
Ledvina died at age 51 of an embolism in a hospital in Manitowoc, Wisconsin, on September 26, 1932.
