= Albert W. Durley =

American politician and lawyer

Albert Williamson Durley (October 15, 1841 – March 12, 1914) was an American politician and lawyer.

Born in Hennepin, Illinois, Durley studied at Wheaton College in Wheaton, Illinois and at Yale University. He then taught school in Illinois and studied law. In 1869, Durley was admitted to the Illinois bar and practiced law in Hennepin, Illinois. In 1875, he moved to Le Mars, Iowa and continued to practice law and was in the real estate business. Then, in 1892, Durley moved to Superior, Wisconsin and continue to practice law. In 1907, Durley was elected to the Wisconsin State Assembly as a Republican. Durley died in Superior, Wisconsin and was buried in Le Mars, Iowa.
