= Thomas A. Roycraft =

American farmer, businessman and politician

Thomas Roycraft

Member of the Wisconsin State Assembly
- In office 1911
- In office 1905–1909

Personal details
- Born: May 26, 1853 County Cork, Ireland
- Died: February 2, 1944 (aged 90) Chippewa Falls, Wisconsin, United States
- Party: Republican

Thomas A. Roycraft (May 26, 1853 – February 2, 1944) was an American farmer, businessman, and politician.

== Biography ==
Born in County Cork, Ireland, Roycraft emigrated with his parents to the United States in 1862. Roycraft lived on a farm near Omro, Wisconsin, Winnebago County, Wisconsin. He then moved to Lafayette, Chippewa County, Wisconsin.

He organized the Lafayette Dairy Company and was director of the Eagle Point Insurance Company. Roycraft served as chairman, assessor, and treasurer of the Town of Lafayette and was active in the Republican Party. From 1905 to 1909 again in 1911, Roycraft served in the Wisconsin State Assembly. Roycraft died at his home in Chippewa Falls, Wisconsin.
