= D. C. Coolidge =

Politician in Wisconsin, US

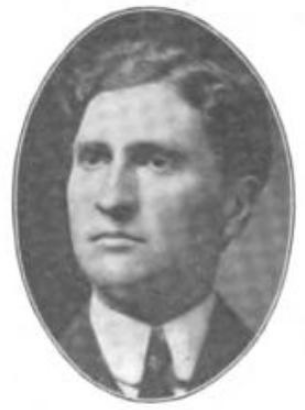

Member of the Wisconsin State Assembly
- In office 1906–1910
- Constituency: Dunn County

Personal details
- Born: Dana C. Coolidge; August 22, 1871 St. Cloud, Wisconsin
- Died: February 27, 1955 (aged 83) Eau Claire, Wisconsin
- Party: Republican
- Spouse: Amy M. Robertson (m. 1900; died 1919)
- Occupation: Journalist, politician

Dana C. Coolidge (August 22, 1871 – February 27, 1955) was a politician from Wisconsin.

Coolidge was born in St. Cloud, Wisconsin in 1871. He worked for the Eau Claire Leader in his youth. Coolidge married Amy M. Robertson in 1900; she died in 1919. He was elected to the Wisconsin State Assembly in 1906 and 1908. Other positions he held include chairman of the county board of Dunn County, Wisconsin. He was a Republican. Coolidge died on February 27, 1955, at Hill View in Eau Claire, Wisconsin. (Note: The article on his will in The Daily Telegram mistakenly refers to him as a woman.)
