= Ray J. Nye =

American politician

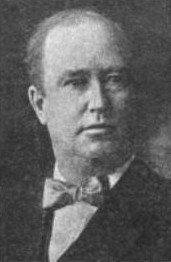

Member of the Wisconsin State Senate
- In office 1919–1921

Member of the Wisconsin State Assembly
- In office 1907, 1911–1915

Personal details
- Born: March 21, 1871 Davenport, Iowa, US
- Died: June 17, 1937 (aged 66) Superior, Wisconsin, US
- Party: Republican

Ray J. Nye (March 21, 1871 – June 17, 1937) was a member of the Wisconsin State Assembly and Wisconsin State Senate.

== Early life ==
Ray J. Nye was born in Davenport, Iowa on March 21, 1871. He moved to Superior, Wisconsin in 1892.

== Career ==
Nye served four terms on the Douglas County, Wisconsin Board, eventually becoming chairman of the board. He was a member of the Assembly in 1907 and again from 1911 to 1915 and of the Senate from 1919 to 1921. Nye was a Republican.

Nye died in Superior on June 17, 1937, after a year-long illness.
