= John O. Thomas =

American politician

John O. Thomas was an American politician. He was a member of the Wisconsin State Assembly.

== Biography ==
Thomas was born on November 23, 1867, in Caledonia, Wisconsin. He would become a farmer there. Thomas was affiliated with Presbyterianism. He died on February 2, 1961.

== Political career ==
Thomas was elected to the Assembly in 1904 and 1906. Previously, he had been town clerk of Caledonia, now a village, from 1896 to 1899. He was a Republican.
