= Valentine S. Keppel =

American farmer and politician

Valentine S. "V.S." "Val" Keppel (February 21, 1865 – September 7, 1940) was an American farmer and politician.

Born in La Crosse County, Wisconsin in Mormon Coulee, Keppel went to the public schools. He was a farmer and lived in Long Coulee near Holmen, Wisconsin. He was the manager and secretary of the Holmen Cooperative Creamery and was also secretary of the Holmen Telephone Company. Keppel was also one of the directors of the Holmen Bank. Keppel was a supporter of United States Senator Robert M. La Follette, Sr. and the Wisconsin Progressive Party. Keppel served on the grade school and high school board. He also served on the La Crosse County Board and was chairman of the county board. During World War I, Keppel served on the local draft board. From 1907 to 1909, Keppel served in the Wisconsin State Assembly. Then, from 1925 to 1933, Keppel served in the Wisconsin State Senate and was a Republican. Keppel died in Holmen, Wisconsin as a result of a stroke.
