= James H. Noble =

American physician and politician

James Harvey Noble (March 30, 1851 – March 1, 1912) was an American physician and politician.

Born in Dane County, Wisconsin, Noble went to the Madison, Wisconsin public schools and the University of Wisconsin. In 1871, Noble received his medical degree from Hahnemann Medical College of Chicago. Noble moved to Eau Claire, Wisconsin in 1871 and practiced medicine. Noble served on the Eau Claire Board of Education and was president of the school board. From 1905 to 1909, Noble served in the Wisconsin State Senate and was a Republican. In 1910, Noble left Eau Claire for Colorado and then New Mexico to regain his health. In 1912, Harvey died in Roswell, New Mexico.
