= Emil Keup =

American politician and businessman

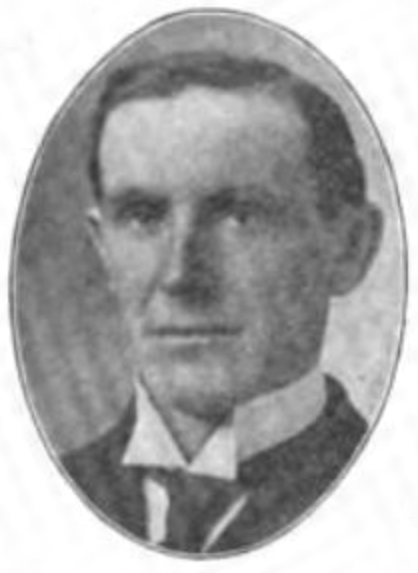

Member of the Wisconsin State Assembly
- In office 1906–1910
- Constituency: Waushara County

Personal details
- Born: Emil G. Keup; 1869 Oshkosh, Wisconsin
- Died: January 24, 1930 (aged 61) Wautoma, Wisconsin
- Party: Republican
- Occupation: Politician

Emil G. Keup (1869 – January 24, 1930) was an American politician and businessman.

Born in Oshkosh, Wisconsin, Keup went to Byrant and Stratton Business College and was involved with the Mount Morris Insurance Company. He served as chairman of the Mount Morris, Wisconsin Town Board and on the Mount Morris School Board. Keup served in the Wisconsin State Assembly in 1907 and 1909 and was a Republican. He was also a supporter of United States Senator Robert M. La Follette, Sr. and Republican Progressive politics. Keup died in Wautoma, Wisconsin while shoveling his car out from snow.
