= Albert M. Stondall =

American politician

Albert M. Stondall (August 4, 1865 – November 7, 1934) was an American businessman and politician.

Born in the town of Cottage Grove, Dane County, Wisconsin, Stondall went to Northwestern Business College. Stondall was a farmer and then became a real estate developer in Wisconsin in 1894. He was also in the lumber and banking businesses. From 1905 to 1907, Stondall served in the Wisconsin State Senate and was a Republican. Stondall died in a hospital in Madison, Wisconsin of a heart ailment.
