= Ove H. Berg =

American politician and businessman

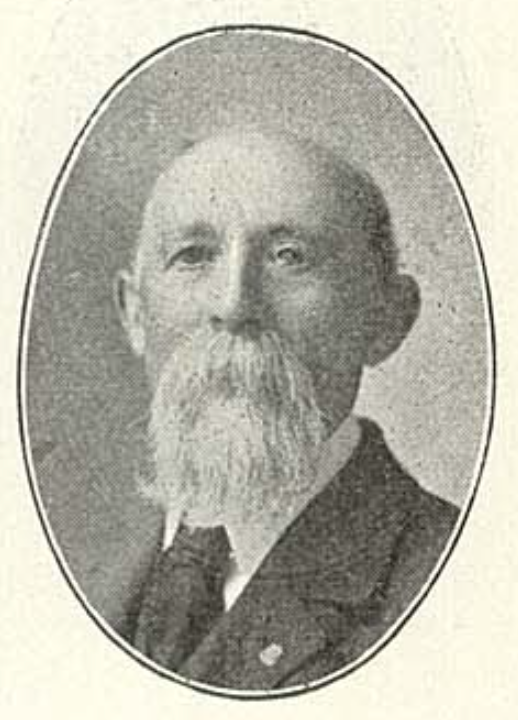
Ove Berg, Wisconsin businessman and legislator

Ove H. Berg (December 20, 1840 – March 30, 1922) was an American politician and businessman.

Born in the Duchy of Schleswig (then a Danish fief) Berg was educated in the public schools. He held what he later described as "several responsible positions" before emigrating to the United States with his family in 1881 (after Schleswig-Holstein had become part of the Kingdom of Prussia). He settled in Ashland, Wisconsin, in 1883, and owned a meat market and grocery store with his son M. H. Berg, to whom he transferred management of the store in 1895.

== Public office ==
Berg served on the board of education and was long involved in the Republican Party.

In 1906 he was elected to the Wisconsin State Assembly seat for Ashland County, with 1,706 votes to 733 for Democrat Albert F. Fox (Dem.) and 226 for Socialist Jonathan F. Miles (the incumbent, Republican Edward B. Gordon, was not a candidate). He was assigned to the standing committees on legislative expenditures and employes, and on lumber and mining. He was not a candidate for re-election in 1908, and was succeeded by fellow Republican John C. Chapple. In 1910, Chapple was not a candidate and Berg was returned to his old seat, with 1,348 votes to 402 for Socialist Horace Walmsley and 335 for Democrat A. D. McDonald. He was assigned to the committee on public health and sanitation, and chaired the joint committee on statutory revision. Berg did not seek re-election in 1912, and was succeeded by another Republican, D. E. Bowe.

Berg died in 1922 in New London, Wisconsin.
