= Duncan McGregor (politician) =

American politician (1836–1921)

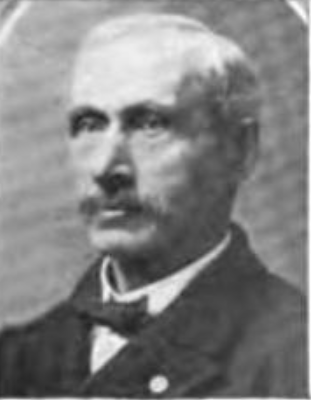

Member of the Wisconsin State Assembly
- In office 1904–1908

Personal details
- Born: August 12, 1836 Perthshire, Scotland
- Died: May 30, 1943 (aged 106) Italy, Wisconsin
- Party: Republican
- Education: University of Aberdeen; Lawrence University
- Occupation: Educator, politician

Duncan McGregor (August 12, 1836 – May 30, 1921) was an American politician and educator.

== Biography ==
Born in Perthshire, Scotland, McGregor emigrated with his father's family to the United States in 1856 and settled in Wisconsin. He had gone to Perth Academy and University of Aberdeen in Scotland and Lawrence University in Appleton, Wisconsin. McGregor farmed and was a teacher and principal of the Waupaca, Wisconsin High School. McGregor served in the 42nd Wisconsin Volunteer Infantry Regiment during the American Civil War and was commissioned captain. McGregor was the mathematics professor of Platteville Normal School in Platteville, Wisconsin. He also served as the institute conductor and president of the Platteville Normal School. In 1905 and 1907, McGregor served in the Wisconsin State Assembly and was a Republican. He also served as private secretary to Wisconsin Governor Francis E. McGovern. McGregor died at his home in Platteville, Wisconsin, May 30, 1921.
