= James A. McKenzie (Wisconsin politician) =

American politician

James A. McKenzie (January 27, 1862 – February 20, 1918) was an American businessman and politician.

Born in Vernon, Wisconsin, McKenzie went to Carroll College (now Carroll University) and was in the general merchandise business. He served a chairman of the Vernon Town Board. He also served as assistant postmaster. McKenzie served in the Wisconsin State Assembly from 1905 to 1909 and was a Republican. McKenzie died in Vernon, Wisconsin.
