= Fred E. Soper =

American politician

Fred E. Soper (February 21, 1854 – June 18, 1930) was an American farmer, livestock dealer, and politician.

Soper was born in the town of Brooklyn, Green Lake County, Wisconsin. He moved with his parents to a farm near Ripon, Wisconsin. Soper then bought his own farm and raised livestock. In 1907, Soper served in the Wisconsin State Assembly; he was a Republican. Soper died of a heart attack in Ripon, Wisconsin.
