= Roderick Ainsworth =

American politician

Member of the Wisconsin Assembly
- In office 1901–1908

Personal details
- Born: 1842 DuPage County, Illinois
- Died: October 1925 (aged 82–83) Waukesha, Wisconsin

Roderick Ainsworth was a member of the Wisconsin State Assembly.

== Biography ==
Ainsworth was born in DuPage County, Illinois in 1842. He moved to Wisconsin in 1844. Ainsworth died at his home in Waukesha, Wisconsin in October 1925.

== Career ==
Ainsworth was a member of the Assembly from 1901 to 1908. He was a Republican.
