= August F. Marquardt =

American politician

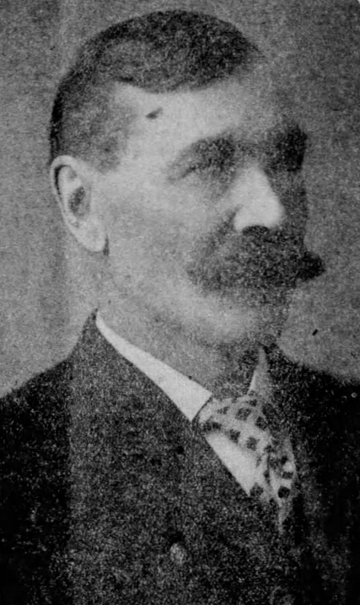

Member of the Wisconsin State Assembly
- In office 1905–1909

Personal details
- Born: January 8, 1850 Bandekow, Pomerania, Kingdom of Prussia
- Died: January 17, 1920 (aged 70) Wausau, Wisconsin
- Party: Republican
- Occupation: Businessman, politician

August F. Marquardt (January 8, 1850 – January 17, 1920) was an American businessman and politician.

Born in Bandekow, Pomerania, Kingdom of Prussia, Marquardt emgranted with his family to the United States in 1866 and settled in Wausau, Wisconsin. Marquardt was in the logging and lumber business. He was also in the banking business. In 1883, Marquardt was elected to the Wausau Common Council. He also served on the city park and water commissions. In 1900, he was elected Sheriff of Marathon County, Wisconsin and was a Republican. From 1905 to 1909, he served in the Wisconsin State Assembly.

He died at his home in Wausau on January 17, 1920.
