= David Morris (Wisconsin politician) =

American politician

David J. Morris (December 21, 1849 – November 14, 1914) was a Welsh-American farmer and politician.

Born in Carmarthenshire, Wales, Morris emigrated with in parent to the United States in 1851 and settled in the town of Ridgeway, Iowa County, Wisconsin. Morris went to the public school and to the University of Wisconsin for one year. Morris was a farmer. In 1907, Morris served in the Wisconsin State Assembly and was involved with the Republican Party. Morris died at a hospital in Madison, Wisconsin following surgery.
