= John A. Hazelwood =

American politician

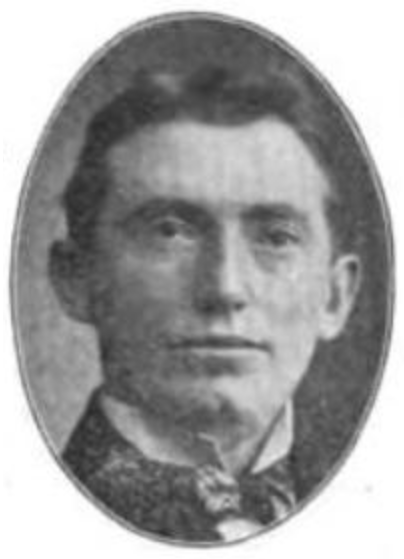

Member of the Wisconsin State Senate
- In office 1908–1912
- Constituency: District 23

Personal details
- Born: John Adam Hazelwood; October 28, 1867 Concord, Wisconsin
- Died: January 8, 1923 (aged 55) Milwaukee, Wisconsin
- Party: Democratic
- Education: St. John's Northwestern Military Academy; Indiana University Maurer School of Law
- Occupation: Lawyer, politician

John Adam Hazelwood (October 28, 1867 – January 8, 1923) was an American lawyer and politician. He served in the Wisconsin State Senate.

== Early life ==
John A. Hazelwood was born in 1867 on a farm near the town of Concord, Jefferson County, Wisconsin, Hazelwood went to the public schools. Hazel also went to St. John's Military Academy, Valparaiso University, and Indiana University Maurer School of Law. He studied law and engineering courses at Valparaiso University.

== Career ==
Hazelwood taught school in Oconomowoc, Wisconsin, and was elected as the school superintendent for Jefferson County in 1898 and re-elected three times. Hazelwood practiced law in Hartford, Wisconsin, Jefferson, Wisconsin, and was the Jefferson city attorney. From 1907 to 1911, Hazelwood served in the Wisconsin State Senate and was a Democrat. He later moved to Madison, Wisconsin, and was appointed as the secretary and chief examiner of the Wisconsin Civil Service Commission in 1913. Then, he moved to Milwaukee, Wisconsin, and continued to practice law. Hazelwood served as the chairman of the Wisconsin Highway Commission from its establishment in 1911 to 1922.

== Death ==
Hazelwood died at his home on January 8, 1923, in Milwaukee after a six-week illness and was buried in Oconomowoc.
