= Joseph Domachowski =

American politician

Joseph A. Domachowski (November 26, 1872 – July 2, 1942) was an American politician. He was a member of the Wisconsin State Assembly.

Born in Poland, Domachowski emigrated to the United States and settled in Milwaukee, Wisconsin in 1881. Domachowski was a painter and decorator and worked with Prudential Mutual Insurance. Domachowski served in the Wisconsin State Assembly in 1907 and 1909 was a Democrat. He served as President of the Polish Association of America. He was also Milwaukee County director of pensions and was to retire on July 31, 1942. Domachowski died of a heart ailment in Milwaukee, Wisconsin.
