= Simon F. Wehrwein =

American farmer, teacher, and politician

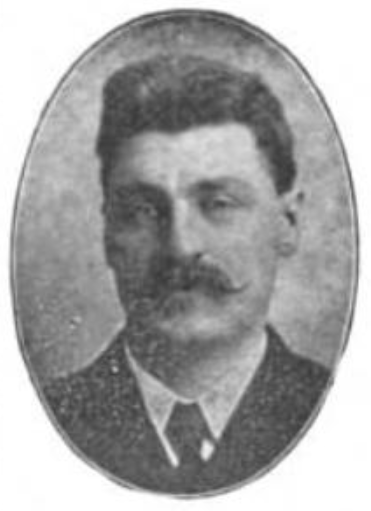

Member of the Wisconsin State Assembly
- In office 1904–1912
- Constituency: Manitowoc County First District

Personal details
- Born: January 9, 1869 Newton, Manitowoc County, Wisconsin
- Died: July 14, 1938 (aged 69) Madison, Wisconsin
- Party: Republican
- Occupation: Farmer; teacher; politician

Simon F. Wehrwein, Jr. (January 9, 1869 – July 14, 1938) was a farmer, teacher, and politician.

Born in the town of Newton, Manitowoc County, Wisconsin, Wehrwein worked on the family farm and went to Oshkosh Normal School. He then taught school in Mequon, Wisconsin, and rural Manitowoc County. He was involved with the Manitowoc County Teachers Association and was on the board of common schools examiners. Wehrwein was also involved in the fire insurance industry. Wehrwein served in the Wisconsin State Assembly from 1905 to 1911 and was a Republican. Later, Wehrwein was active with the Wisconsin Progressive Party. He died in a hospital in Madison, Wisconsin, from a heart ailment.
