= Otto Harrass =

American politician

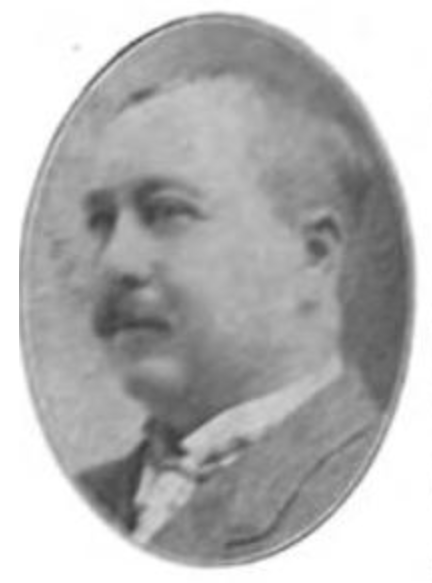

Member of the Wisconsin State Assembly
- In office 1906–1910
- Constituency: Milwaukee County Second District

Personal details
- Born: July 13, 1869 Milwaukee, Wisconsin, US
- Died: September 19, 1910 (aged 41) Milwaukee, Wisconsin, US
- Party: Republican
- Occupation: Politician

Otto A. Harrass (July 13, 1869 – September 19, 1910) was a member of the Wisconsin State Assembly.

== Biography ==
Harrass was born on July 13, 1869, in Milwaukee, Wisconsin, where he along the way received a religious-based education. During the Spanish–American War, he served in the United States Army. Harrass died in Milwaukee on September 19, 1910. He was buried in Milwaukee.

== Political career ==
Harrass was elected to the Assembly for Milwaukee County's Second District in 1906 and 1908. He was a Republican.
