= Edward Webster LeRoy =

American politician

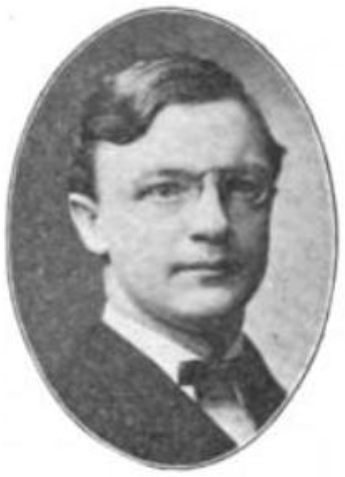

Member of the Wisconsin State Assembly
- In office 1902–1910
- Constituency: Marinette County First District

Personal details
- Born: January 30, 1874 Marinette, Wisconsin
- Died: January 1, 1940 (aged 65) Marinette, Wisconsin
- Party: Republican
- Occupation: Newspaper editor, politician

Edward Webster LeRoy (January 30, 1874 – January 1, 1940) was an American newspaper editor and politician.

Edward Webster LeRoy was born in Marinette, Wisconsin on January 30, 1874. (Note: His obituary in The Rhinelander Daily News gives his birth date as January 13, 1874, which contradicts the date he himself provided on his World War I draft registration card and other sources.) He attended the public schools in Marinette and was the editor of the Daily Eagle and later the Daily Eagle-Star. LeRoy served in the Wisconsin State Assembly in 1903, 1905, 1907, and 1909 as a Republican. He was nominated for postmaster by President Coolidge in 1924. LeRoy died suddenly in Marinette on January 1, 1940.
