= Simon Smith (politician) =

American politician

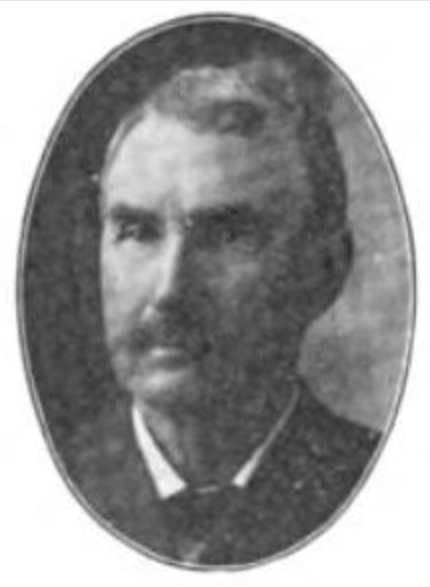

Member of the Wisconsin State Assembly
- In office 1906–1912
- Constituency: Rock County Third District

Personal details
- Born: November 14, 1839 Axbridge, England
- Died: November 7, 1924 (aged 84) Beloit, Wisconsin
- Party: Republican
- Occupation: Politician

Simon Smith (November 14, 1839 – November 7, 1924) was a member of the Wisconsin State Assembly.

== Biography ==
Smith was born on November 14, 1839, in Axbridge, England. He settled in Beloit, Wisconsin, in 1856. During the American Civil War, he served with the 15th Illinois Volunteer Infantry Regiment of the Union Army.

He died in Beloit on November 7, 1924.

== Political career ==
Smith was a member of the Assembly during the 1907, 1909 and 1911 sessions. Previously, he had been Mayor of Beloit from 1899 to 1904. Additionally, Smith was a member of the county board of Rock County, Wisconsin, and went on to be its Chairman. He was a Republican.
