= Henry Lockney =

American politician

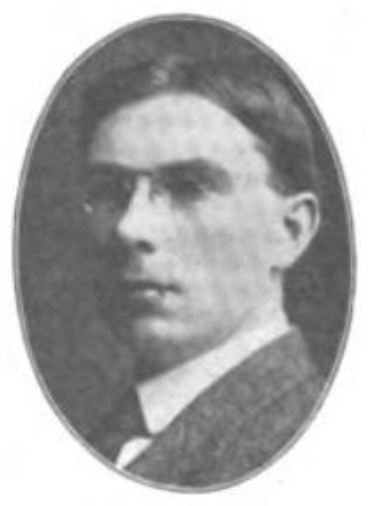

Member of the Wisconsin State Senate
- In office 1909–1913
- Constituency: District 33

Personal details
- Born: October 26, 1874 Muskego, Wisconsin
- Died: December 21, 1944 (aged 70) Waukesha, Wisconsin
- Party: Republican
- Occupation: Lawyer, politician

Henry Lockney (October 26, 1874 – December 21, 1944) was an American lawyer, jurist, and politician.

== Biography ==
Born on a farm, near the community of Tess Corners, in the town of Muskego, Wisconsin, Lockney moved with his parents to Waukesha, Wisconsin in 1880. He went to the Waukesha public schools and then graduated from University of Wisconsin in 1897. In 1898, Lockney was admitted to the Wisconsin bar. Lockney practiced law in Waukesha, Wisconsin. He served a Waukesha County, Wisconsin court commissioner. In 1902, Lockney was elected Waukesha City Attorney. He also served as Waukesha County District Attorney. Lockney served as Waukesha Library commissioner and was secretary of the library board. He was involved in the Republican Party. From 1909 to 1913, Lockney served in the Wisconsin State Senate. In 1939, Lockney was appointed Wisconsin Circuit Court judge and was defeated for re-election in the Wisconsin Spring Election of 1940. Lockney died in a hospital in Waukesha, Wisconsin of a heart ailment.
