= David F. Mains =

American politician

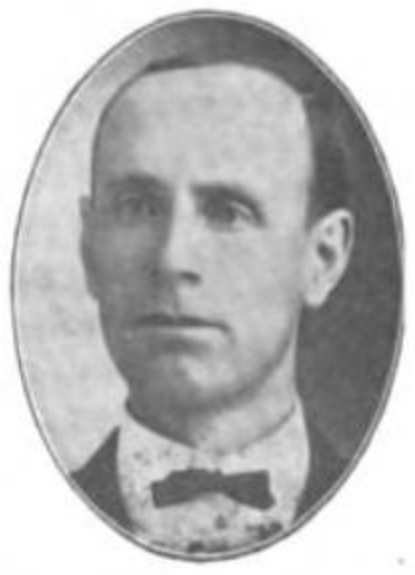

Member of the Wisconsin State Assembly
- In office 1906–1910
- Constituency: Vernon County

Personal details
- Born: September 14, 1874 Webster, Vernon County, Wisconsin
- Died: September 2, 1949 (aged 74) Eugene, Oregon
- Party: Republican
- Occupation: Teacher, politician

David F. Mains (September 14, 1874 – September 2, 1949) was a member of the Wisconsin State Assembly.

== Biography ==
Mains was born on September 14, 1874. Sources have differed on the location. From 1896 to 1900, he was a schoolteacher. He died at his home in Eugene, Oregon on September 2, 1949.

== Political career ==
Mains was elected to the Assembly in 1906 and 1908. He also served as town clerk of Clinton, Vernon County, Wisconsin. He was a Republican.
