= William A. Kay =

American politician

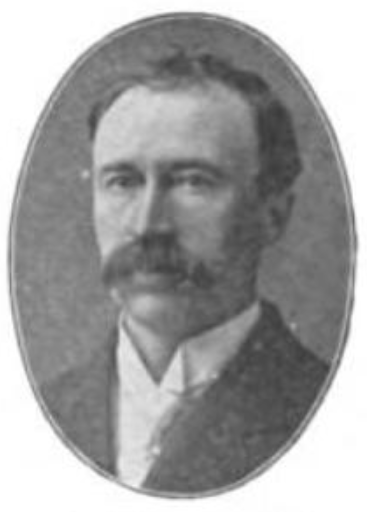

Member of the Wisconsin State Assembly
- Constituency: Pierce County
- In office 1908–1912
- In office 1914–1916
- In office 1930 – November 27, 1931

Personal details
- Born: February 22, 1864 Martell, Wisconsin
- Died: November 27, 1931 (aged 67) Madison, Wisconsin
- Party: Republican
- Occupation: Farmer, politician

William A. Kay (February 22, 1864 – November 27, 1931) was an American farmer and politician.

Born in Martell, Wisconsin, Kay was a farmer and served in town government. He served in the Wisconsin State Assembly in 1909, 1911, 1915, and 1931 as a Republican. He died in Madison, Wisconsin while still in office.
