= Christian C. Wellensgard =

American politician (1849–1926)

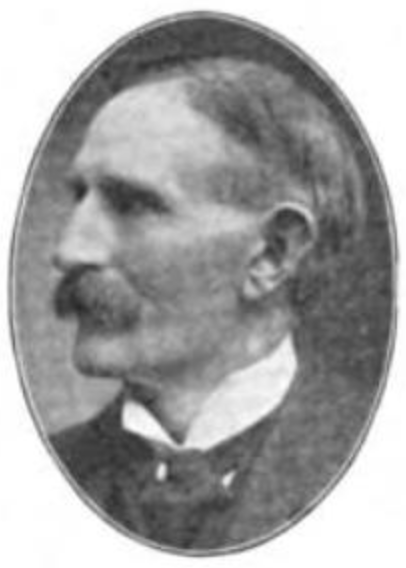

Member of the Wisconsin State Assembly
- In office 1906–1910
- Constituency: Green Lake County

Personal details
- Born: July 29, 1849 Denmark
- Died: November 15, 1926 (aged 77) Berlin, Wisconsin
- Party: Republican
- Occupation: Politician

Christian C. Wellensgard (July 29, 1849 – November 15, 1926) was a member of the Wisconsin State Assembly.

== Biography ==
Wellensgard was born on July 29, 1849, in Denmark. He later moved to Berlin, Wisconsin. He died in Berlin, Wisconsin on November 15, 1926.

== Career ==
Wellensgard was elected to the Assembly in 1905 and re-elected in 1906. He was investigated for vote buying in 1909. Additionally, he was a member of the Berlin School Board and the Berlin Common Council. He was a Republican.
