= William Disch =

American politician (1840–1912)

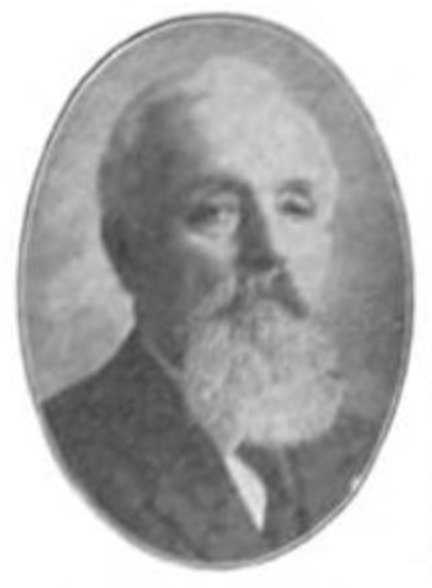

Member of the Wisconsin State Assembly
- In office 1906–1910
- Constituency: Milwaukee County Third District

Personal details
- Born: January 12, 1840 Glarus, Switzerland
- Died: 1912 (aged 71–72)
- Resting place: Forest Home Cemetery
- Party: Republican
- Occupation: Politician

William Disch (January 12, 1840 – 1912) was a Swiss-born member of the Wisconsin State Assembly.

== Biography ==
Disch was born on January 12, 1840, in Glarus, Switzerland. He later moved to Milwaukee, Wisconsin. During the American Civil War, he served with the 24th Wisconsin Volunteer Infantry Regiment of the Union Army. Disch died in 1912 and was buried at Forest Home Cemetery.

== Political career ==
Disch was elected to the Assembly for Milwaukee County's Third District in 1906 and 1908. Previously, he had been a security guard at the Wisconsin State Capitol. He was a Republican.
