= Edward J. Keyes =

American politician

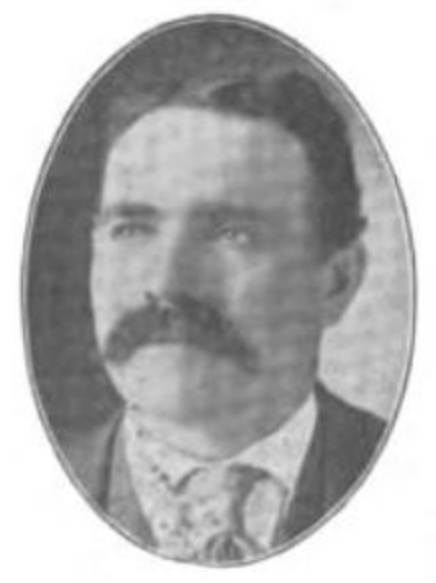

Member of the Wisconsin State Assembly
- In office 1906–1910
- Constituency: Sheboygan County Second District

Personal details
- Born: January 29, 1859 Lyndon, Sheboygan County, Wisconsin
- Died: May 10, 1929 (aged 70) Plymouth, Wisconsin
- Party: Republican
- Occupation: Farmer, politician

Edward J. Keyes (January 29, 1859 – May 10, 1929) was an American farmer and politician.

Born in the town of Lyndon, Sheboygan County, Wisconsin. Keyes was a farmer, in the town of Lyndon, and owned a cheese factory. He also worked for the I. L. Wood Barbed Wire Fence Manufacturing Company and worked on a farm for two years in DeKalb, Illinois. Keyes served as chairman of the Lyndon Town Board and was a Republican. He served in the Wisconsin State Assembly in 1907 and 1909. Keyes died near Plymouth, Wisconsin after a long illness.
