= John R. Jones (Wisconsin politician) =

American politician

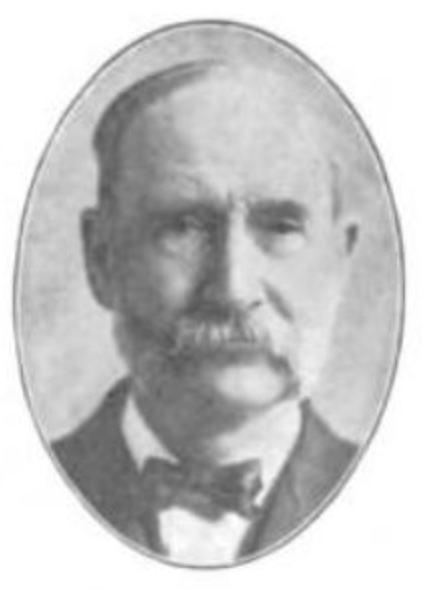

Member of the Wisconsin State Assembly
- In office 1906–1912
- Constituency: Monroe County

Personal details
- Born: 1850 Pittsburgh, Pennsylvania
- Died: January 1, 1933 (aged 82–83) Sparta, Wisconsin
- Party: Republican
- Occupation: Farmer, politician

John R. Jones (1850 – January 1, 1933) was an American politician. He served as a member of the Wisconsin State Assembly from 1907–1912. Other positions he held include Chairman (similar to Mayor) of Leon, Monroe County, Wisconsin and Chairman of the Republican county committee and the county board of Monroe County, Wisconsin. He was born in Pittsburgh, Pennsylvania in 1850.

He died in Sparta, Wisconsin on January 1, 1933.
