= Albert W. Sanborn =

American politician (1853–1937)

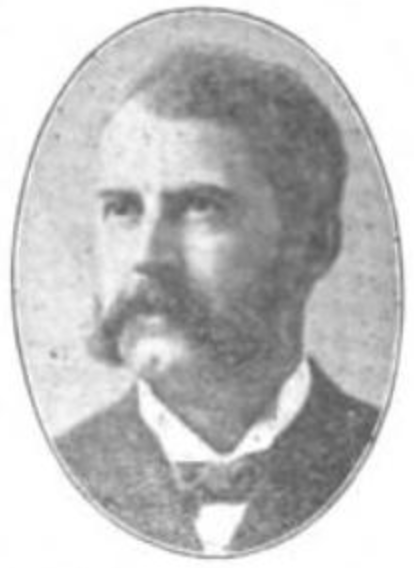

Member of the Wisconsin State Senate
- In office 1904–1912
- Constituency: District 12

Member of the Wisconsin State Assembly
- In office 1884–1886
- Constituency: Portage County

Personal details
- Born: Albert Whittemore Sanborn; January 17, 1853 Town of Swanton, Vermont
- Died: July 15, 1937 (aged 84) Ashland, Wisconsin
- Party: Republican
- Education: Muskingum College
- Occupation: Lawyer, politician

Albert Whittemore Sanborn (January 17, 1853 – July 15, 1937) was a member of the Wisconsin State Assembly and the Wisconsin State Senate.

== Biography ==
Sanborn was born on January 17, 1853, in Swanton, Vermont. He attended Muskingum College before moving to Stevens Point, Wisconsin, and was admitted to the bar in 1876. He then moved to Oshkosh, Wisconsin in April 1876, where he studied for about two months. In June, he practiced law first as a member of the firm Jones & Sandborn along with D. Lloyd Jones, and afterwards as a member of the firm of Cate, Jones & Sandborn, adding George W. Cate, followed by Cate, Sanborn, Lamoreux & Park. In 1893, he moved to Ashland, Wisconsin.

He died at his home in Ashland on July 15, 1937.

== Career ==
Sanborn was a member of the Assembly in 1885. Previously, he was District Attorney of Portage County, Wisconsin. Sanborn was a delegate to the Republican National Convention in 1888 and 1912. He served in the Senate from 1905 to 1912.
