= Wisconsin's Dane County 1st Assembly district =

Former American legislative district

Wisconsin's Dane County 1st State Assembly district
- Obsolete
- Notes: 1848–1972

Wisconsin's Dane County 1st Assembly district was a district in the Wisconsin State Assembly for most of the history of the state of Wisconsin, up to the legislative redistricting reforms of 1972 which created the current numbered districts. Located in central Wisconsin, the district was one of the 66 original Assembly districts defined in Article XIV of the Constitution of Wisconsin. The Constitution originally allocated five districts for Dane County, Wisconsin; this district originally comprised the northeast quadrant of Dane County.

The district was in use for the first 124 years of Wisconsin's history, from 1848 to 1972. The district served all or part of Madison, Wisconsin, from 1882 to 1972.

== List of representatives ==
List of representatives from the Dane County 1st district
Member	Party	Residence	Term start	Term end	Leg.
District created
Henry M. Warner	Dem.	Cottage Grove	June 5, 1848	January 1, 1849	1st
Charles Rickerson	Dem.	Medina	January 1, 1849	January 7, 1850	2nd
John Hasey	Dem.	York	January 7, 1850	January 6, 1851	3rd
Abram Boyce	Dem.		January 6, 1851	January 5, 1852	4th
William A. Pierce	Dem.	Sun Prairie	January 5, 1852	January 3, 1853	5th
Perez C. Burdick	Dem.	Albion	January 3, 1853	January 2, 1854	6th
Charles R. Head	Whig	Albion	January 2, 1854	January 1, 1855	7th
Jonathan Mosher	Rep.	Stoughton	January 1, 1855	January 7, 1856	8th
Charles R. Head	Rep.	Albion	January 7, 1856	January 5, 1857	9th
John Anders Johnson	Rep.	Stoughton	January 5, 1857	January 4, 1858	10th
Daniel B. Crandall	Rep.	Utica	January 4, 1858	January 3, 1859	11th
William W. Blackman	Rep.	Stoughton	January 3, 1859	January 7, 1861	12th 13th
Sereno W. Graves	Rep.	Rutland	January 7, 1861	January 6, 1862	14th
Benjamin F. Adams	Rep.	Door Creek	January 6, 1862	January 1, 1863	15th
Charles R. Head	Rep.	Albion	January 1, 1863	January 4, 1864	16th
William W. Blackman	Union	Stoughton	January 4, 1864	January 2, 1865	17th
William M. Colladay	Union	Stoughton	January 2, 1865	January 1, 1866	18th
William D. Potter	Union	Cambridge	January 1, 1866	January 7, 1867	19th
Isaac Adams	Union	Door Creek	January 7, 1867	January 6, 1868	20th
Nelson Williams	Rep.	Stoughton	January 6, 1868	January 4, 1869	21st
John E. Johnson	Rep.	Utica	January 4, 1869	January 3, 1870	22nd
Carpus Loveland	Rep.	Rutland	January 3, 1870	January 2, 1871	23rd
Lemuel Humphrey	Rep.	Albion	January 2, 1871	January 1, 1872	24th
Benjamin F. Adams	Rep.	Pleasant Springs	January 1, 1872	January 6, 1873	25th
Oliver W. Thornton	Rep.	Medina	January 6, 1873	January 5, 1874	26th
John Johnson	Ind.	York	January 5, 1874	January 4, 1875	27th
Isaac Adams	Rep.	Door Creek	January 4, 1875	January 3, 1876	28th
William Seamonson	Rep.	Stoughton	January 3, 1876	January 1, 1877	29th
Michael Johnson	Ref.	Springdale	January 1, 1877	January 7, 1878	30th
John Lyle	Dem.	Montrose	January 7, 1878	January 6, 1879	31st
Matthias Theisen	Dem.	Roxbury	January 6, 1879	January 5, 1880	32nd
John H. Tierney	Dem.	Waunakee	January 5, 1880	January 3, 1881	33rd
Samuel J. Coldwell	Dem.	Mazomanie	January 3, 1881	January 2, 1882	34th
Fritz Elver	Dem.	Middleton	January 2, 1882	January 1, 1883	35th
Dexter Curtis	Dem.	Madison	January 1, 1883	January 5, 1885	36th
William Freeman Vilas	Dem.	Madison	January 5, 1885	March 9, 1885	37th
--Vacant--			March 9, 1885	March 25, 1885	37th
Michael J. Cantwell	Dem.	Madison	March 25, 1885	January 3, 1887	37th
Michael J. Cantwell	Dem.	Madison	January 3, 1887	January 7, 1889	38th
David Stephens	Rep.	Madison	January 7, 1889	January 5, 1891	39th
Harry E. Briggs	Dem.	Madison	January 5, 1891	January 2, 1893	40th
Charles W. Heyl	Dem.	Madison	January 2, 1893	January 7, 1895	41st
George B. Burrows	Rep.	Madison	January 7, 1895	January 4, 1897	42nd
Daniel Bechtel	Dem.	Madison	January 4, 1897	January 2, 1899	43rd
George E. Bryant	Rep.	Madison	January 2, 1899	January 7, 1901	44th
E. Ray Stevens	Rep.	Madison	January 7, 1901	January 5, 1903	45th
Matthew S. Dudgeon	Rep.	Madison	January 5, 1903	January 2, 1905	46th
Ernest Warner	Rep.	Madison	January 2, 1905	January 7, 1907	47th
Elmore Elver	Dem.	Madison	January 7, 1907	January 4, 1909	48th
Frank Smith	Rep.	Madison	January 4, 1909	January 2, 1911	49th
Cornelius A. Harper	Rep.	Madison	January 2, 1911	January 6, 1913	50th
Fred L. Holmes	Rep.	Madison	January 6, 1913	January 4, 1915	51st
John B. Heim	Rep.	Madison	January 4, 1915	January 1, 1917	52nd
William T. Evjue	Rep.	Madison	January 1, 1917	January 6, 1919	53rd
Marcus E. Johnson	Rep.	Madison	January 6, 1919	January 3, 1921	54th
Herman W. Sachtjen	Rep.	Madison	January 3, 1921	January 5, 1925	55th 56th
Herman W. Sachtjen	Rep.	Madison	January 5, 1925	December 31, 1925	57th
--Vacant--			December 31, 1925	January 3, 1927	57th
Alvin C. Reis	Rep.	Madison	January 3, 1927	January 5, 1931	58th 59th
Harold Groves	Rep.	Madison	January 5, 1931	January 2, 1933	60th
Francis Lamb	Rep.	Madison	January 2, 1933	January 7, 1935	61st
Herbert C. Schenk	Prog.	Madison	January 7, 1935	January 6, 1941	62nd 63rd 64th
Lyall T. Beggs	Prog.	Madison	January 6, 1941	January 6, 1947	65th 66th 67th
Lyall T. Beggs	Rep.	Madison	January 6, 1947	January 3, 1949	68th
Ruth Bachhuber Doyle	Dem.	Madison	January 3, 1949	January 5, 1953	69th 70th
Floyd E. Wheeler	Dem.	Madison	January 5, 1953	January 3, 1955	71st
Joseph Wheeler Bloodgood	Dem.	Madison	January 3, 1955	January 7, 1957	72nd
Norman C. Anderson	Dem.	Madison	January 7, 1957	January 5, 1959	73rd
Glenn L. Henry	Dem.	Madison	January 5, 1959	January 2, 1961	74th
Norman C. Anderson	Dem.	Madison	January 2, 1961	January 1, 1973	75th 76th 77th 78th 79th 80th
District abolished by 1971 Wisconsin Act 304; Dane County was divided between the 37th, 38th, 46th, 47th, 50th, 76th, 77th, and 78th Assembly districts The Dane County 1st district was roughly replaced by the 78th Assembly district
