= Wisconsin's 11th Senate district =

American legislative district in southeast Wisconsin

Wisconsin's 11th State Senate district
- 2024 map defined in 2023 Wisc. Act 94; 2022 map defined in Johnson v. Wisconsin Elections Commission; 2011 map was defined in 2011 Wisc. Act 43 composed of Assembly districts 31, 32, and 33
Senator
Stephen Nass; R–Whitewater
since January 3, 2015 (11 years, 249 days)
- Demographics: 87.9% White; 1.19% Black; 7.41% Hispanic; 1.19% Asian; 1.7% Native American; 0.08% Hawaiian/Pacific Islander
- Population (2020) • Voting age: 177,921; 139,936
- Website: Official website
- Notes: Southeast Wisconsin

The 11th Senate district of Wisconsin is one of 33 districts in the Wisconsin Senate. Located in southern Wisconsin, the district comprises most of Walworth County, most of Kenosha County, and southwest Racine County, along with parts of southeast Rock County. It contains the cities of Burlington, Delavan, Elkhorn, and Lake Geneva, and the villages of Clinton, Darien, East Troy, Genoa City, Paddock Lake, Sharon, Union Grove, Walworth, along with most of the village of Pleasant Prairie and part of the city of Kenosha.

== Current elected officials ==
Stephen Nass is the senator representing the 11th district. He was first elected in the 2014 general election, and is now serving in his second term. Before his election as senator, he was a member of the State Assembly from 1991 to 2015.

Each Wisconsin State Senate district is composed of three State Assembly districts. The 11th Senate district comprises the 31st, 32nd, and 33rd Assembly districts. The current representatives of those districts are:

- Assembly District 31: Tyler August (R–Walworth)
- Assembly District 32: Amanda Nedweski (R–Pleasant Prairie)
- Assembly District 33: Robin Vos (R–Rochester)

The 11th Senate district is almost entirely contained within Wisconsin's 1st congressional district, which is represented by U.S. Representative Bryan Steil. The part of the district containing the northeast corner of Walworth County falls within Wisconsin's 5th congressional district, represented by Scott L. Fitzgerald.

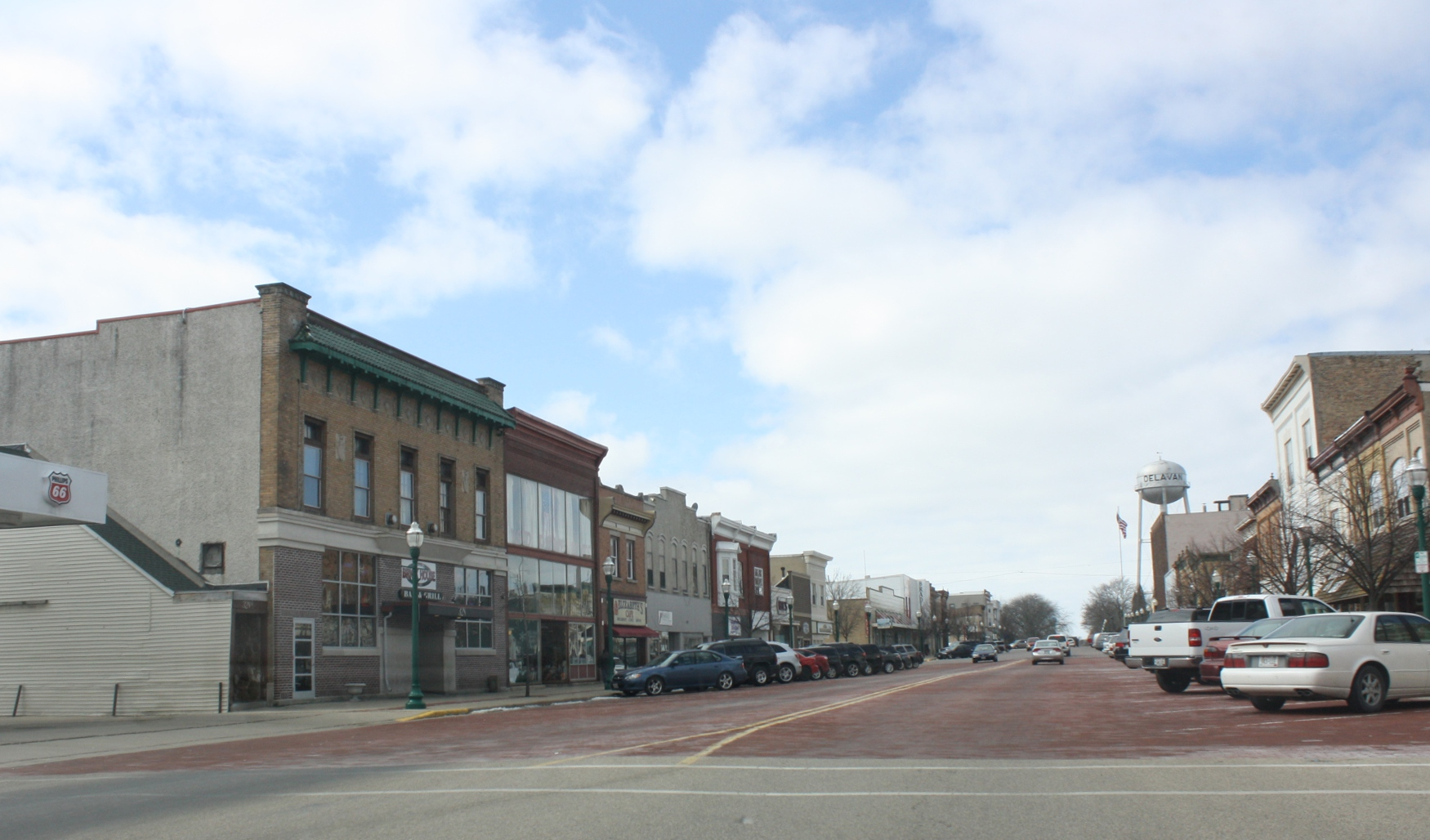
Downtown Delavan

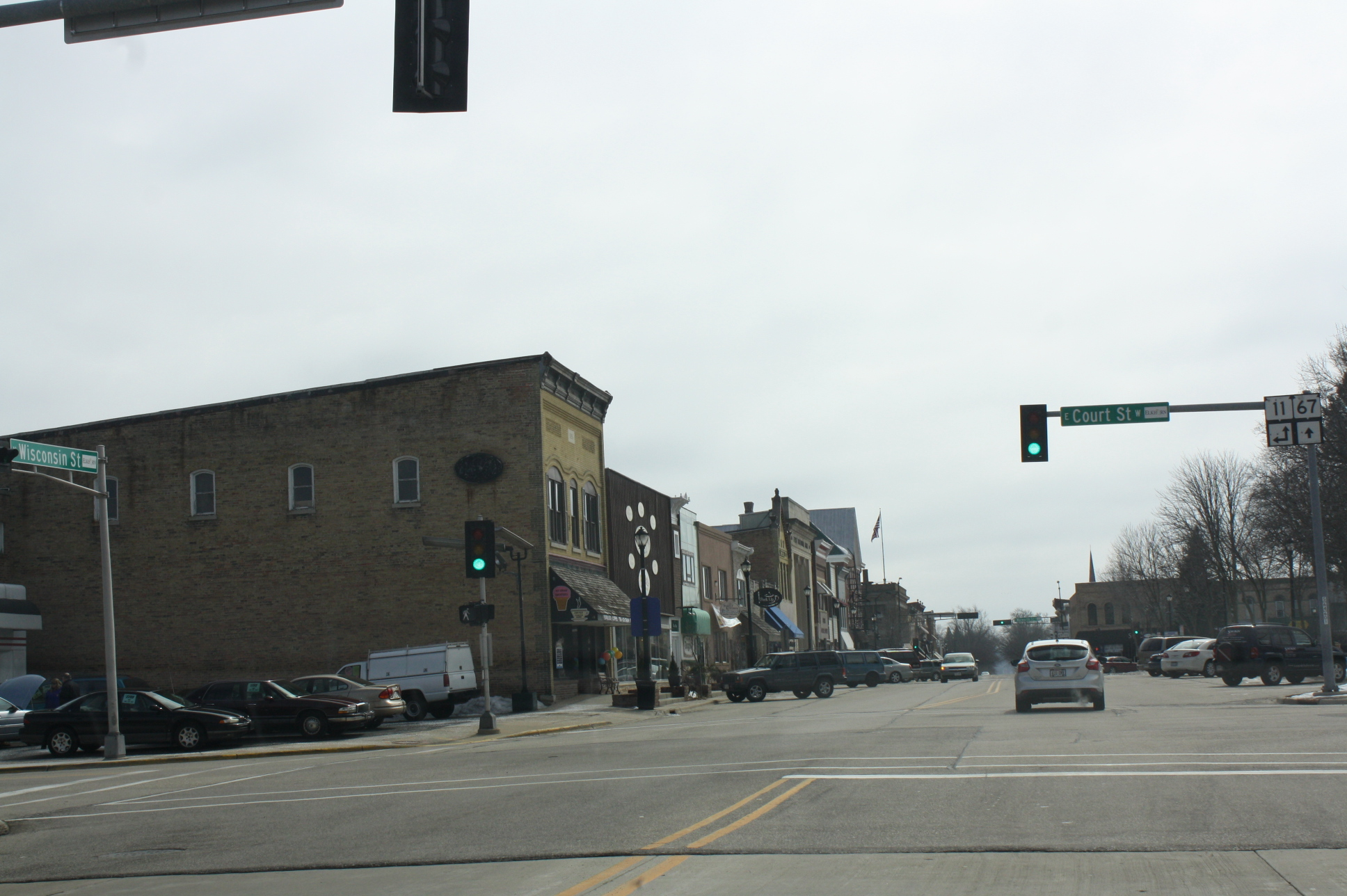
Downtown Elkhorn

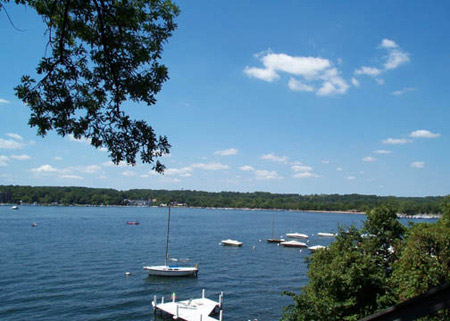
Williams Bay, Wisconsin

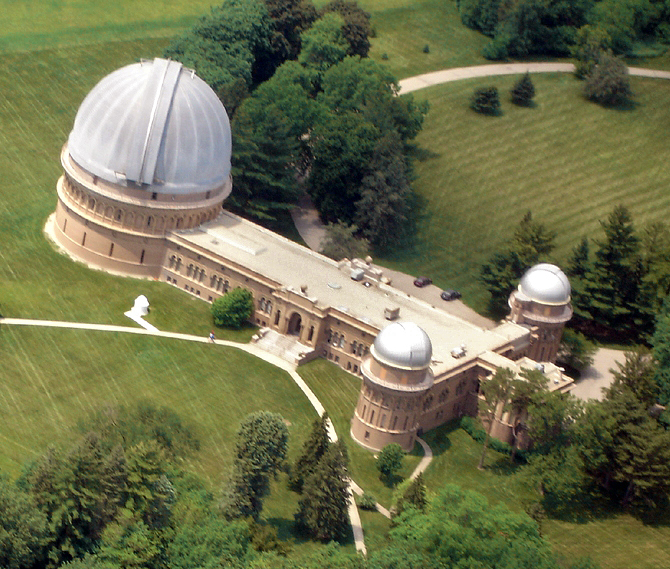
Yerkes Observatory

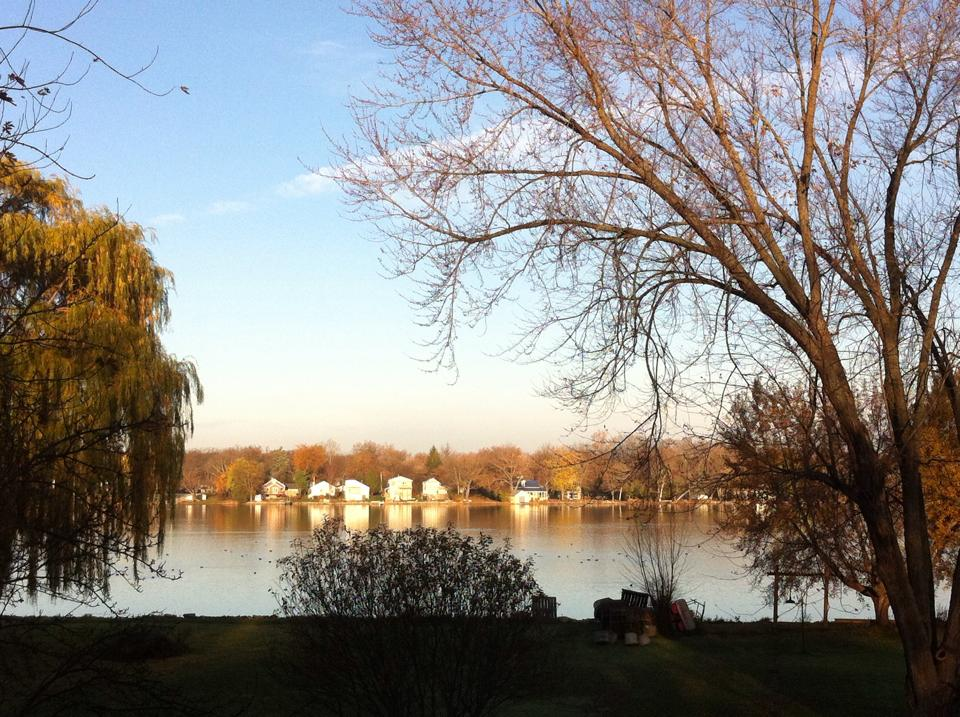
Camp Lake community in the village of Salem Lakes

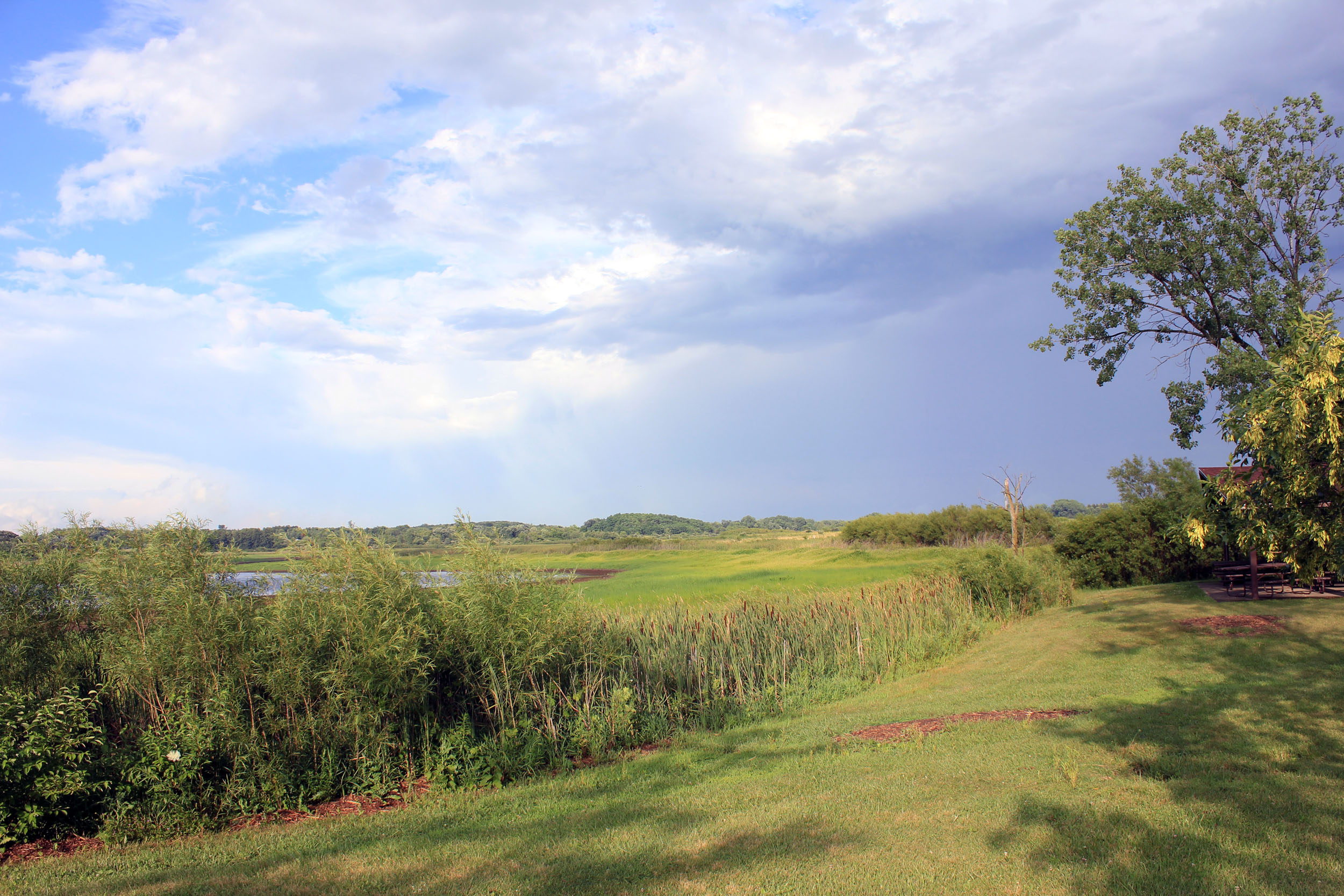
Richard Bong State Recreation Area

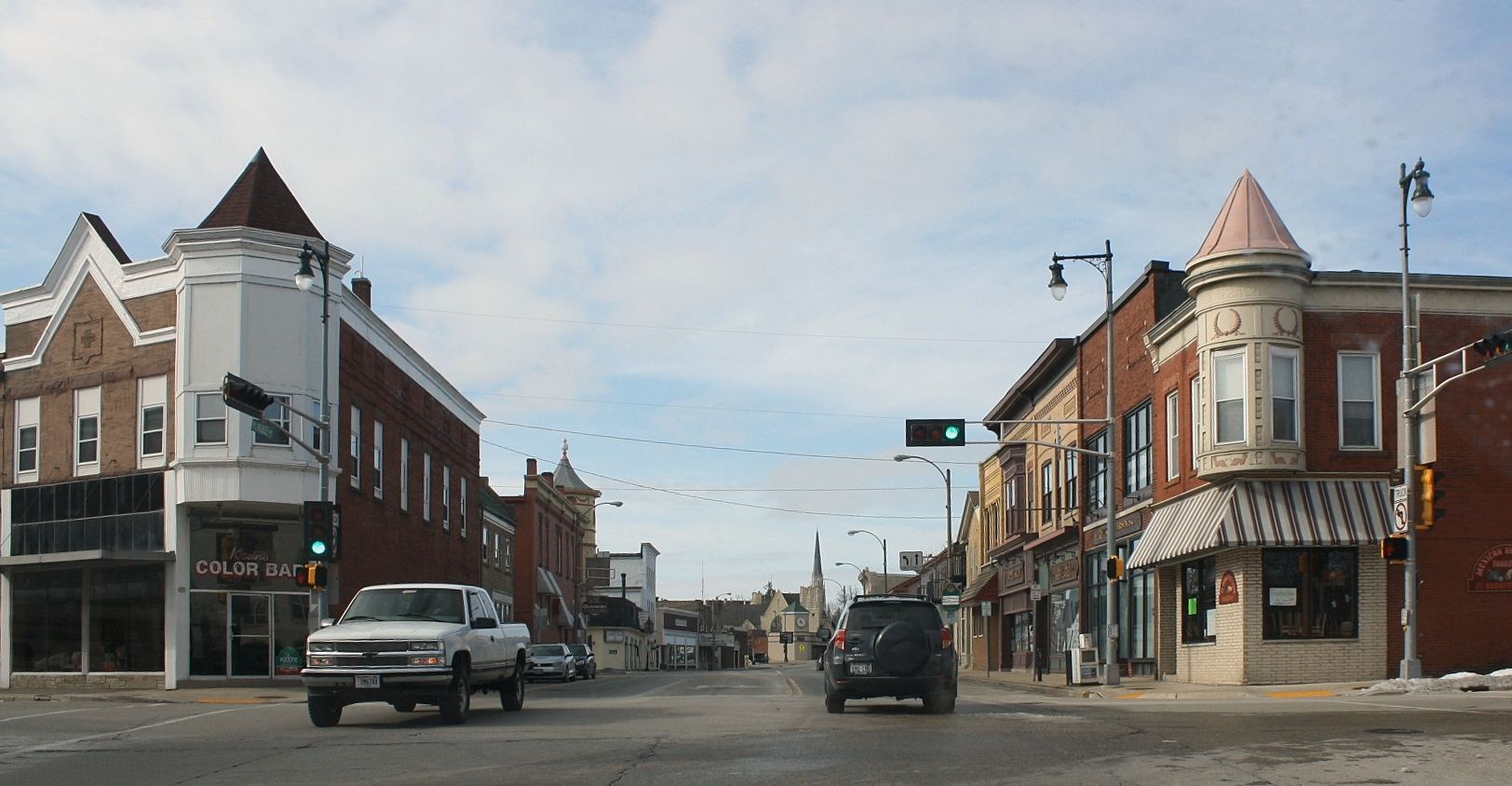
Downtown Historic District in Burlington

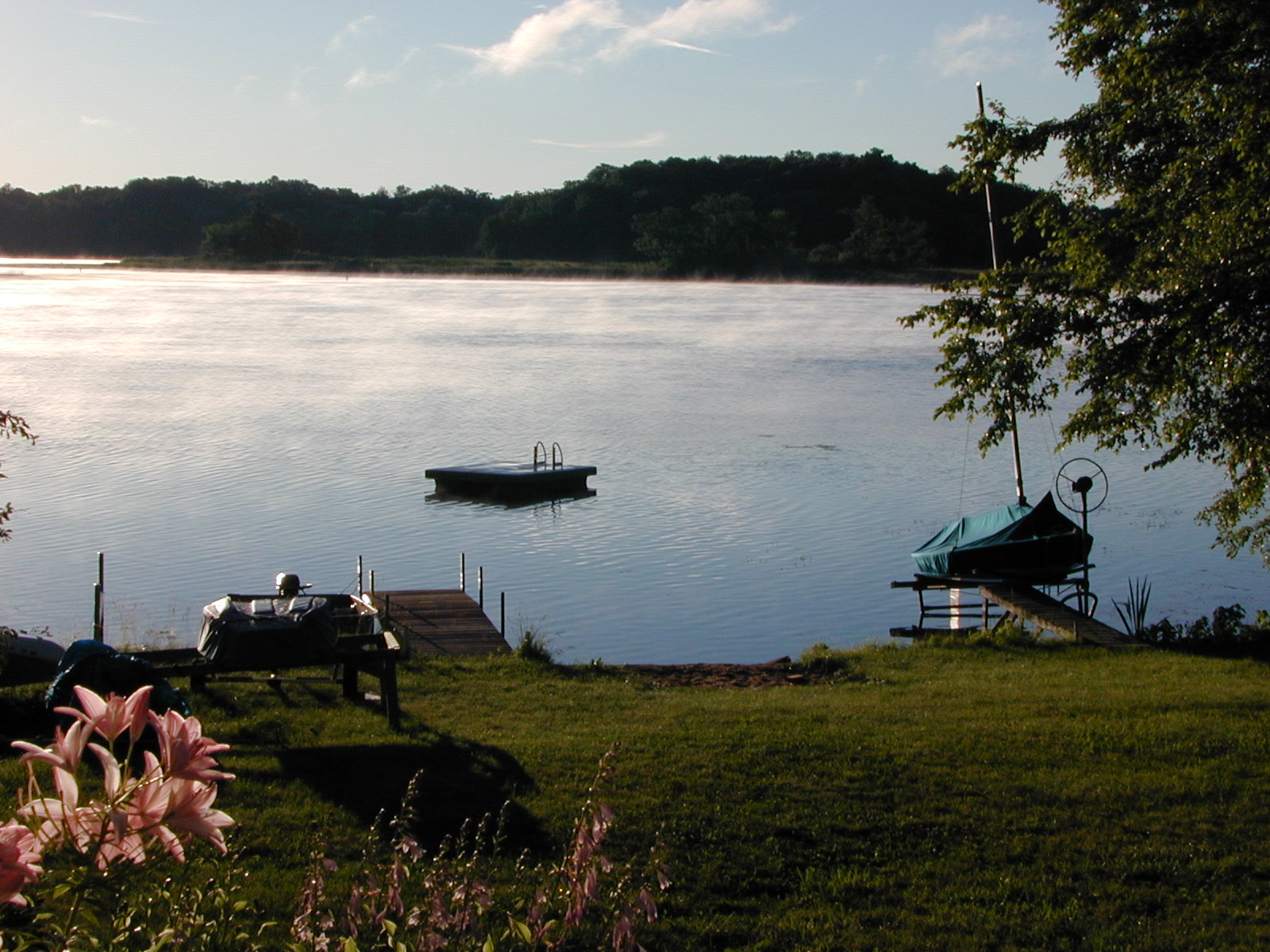
Lake Beulah near East Troy

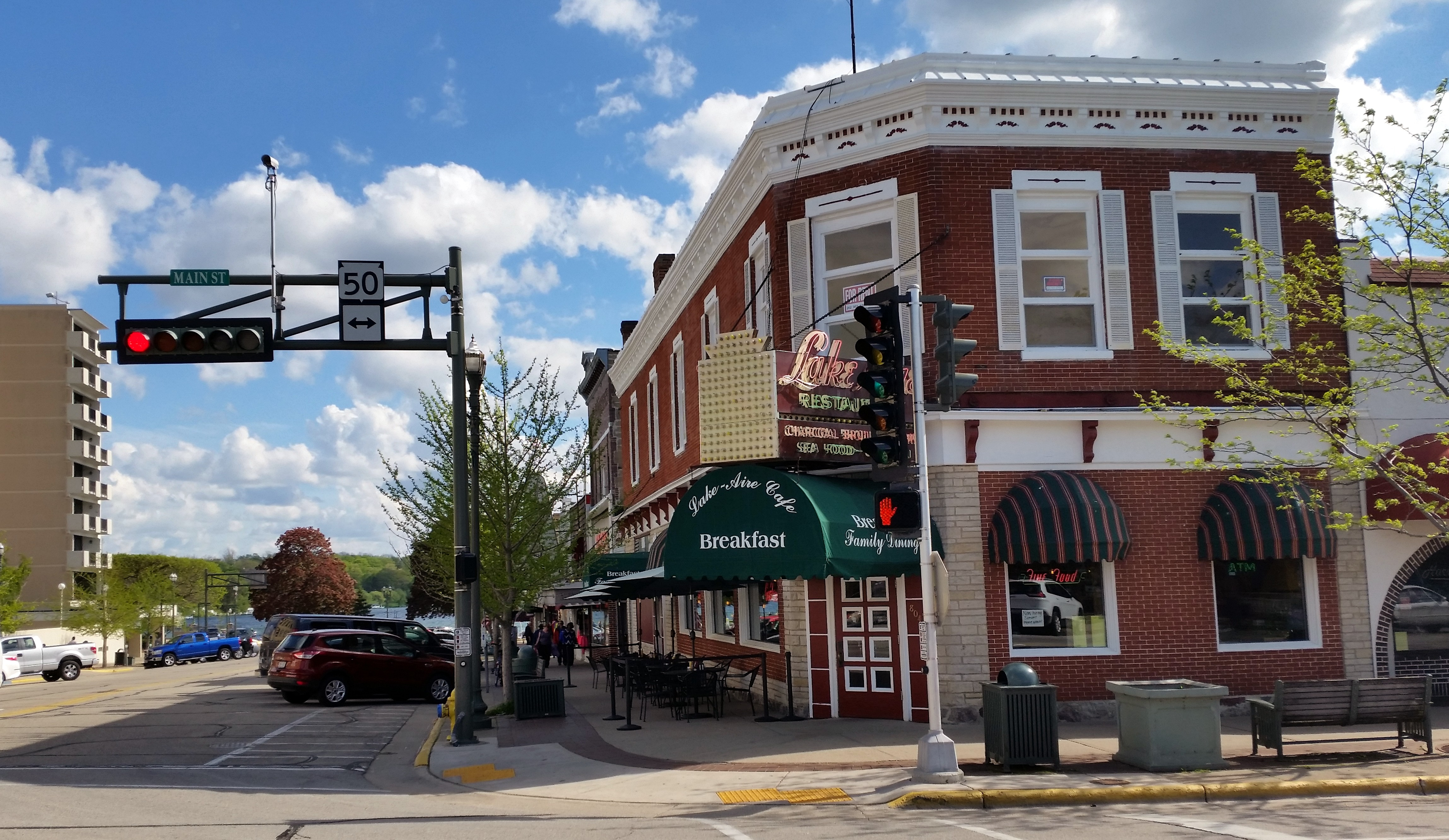
Downtown Lake Geneva

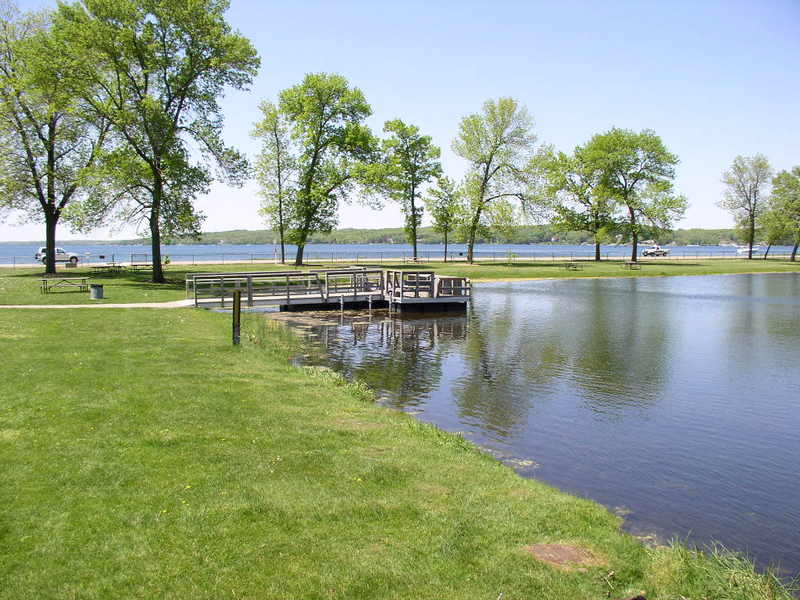
Big Foot Beach State Park

== Past senators ==
Note: the boundaries of districts have changed repeatedly over history. Previous politicians of a specific numbered district have represented a completely different geographic area, due to redistricting.

Previous senators from the district include:

Senator	Party	Notes	Session	Years	District Definition
District created				1848	Washington County
Frederick W. Horn	Dem.		1st	1848	Washington County
Frederick W. Horn	Dem.		2nd	1849	Washington County
Frederick W. Horn	Dem.		3rd	1850	Washington County
Harvey G. Turner	Dem.		4th	1851	Washington County
Harvey G. Turner	Dem.		5th	1852	Washington County
Thomas T. Whittlesey	Dem.		6th	1853	Dane County
Thomas T. Whittlesey	Dem.		7th	1854	Dane County
Hiram Giles	Rep.		8th	1855	Dane County
Hiram Giles	Rep.		9th	1856	Dane County
Hiram Giles	Rep.		10th	1857	Eastern Dane County: Town of Albion; Town of Blooming Grove; Town of Bristol; Town of Burke; Town of Christiana; Town of Cottage Grove; Town of Deerfield; Town of Dunkirk; Town of Dunn; Town of Fitchburg; Town of Medina; Town of Montrose; Town of Oregon; Town of Pleasant Springs; Town of Rutland; Town of Sun Prairie; Town of Verona; Town of Windsor; Town of York
Hiram Giles	Rep.		11th	1858	Eastern Dane County: Town of Albion; Town of Blooming Grove; Town of Bristol; Town of Burke; Town of Christiana; Town of Cottage Grove; Town of Deerfield; Town of Dunkirk; Town of Dunn; Town of Fitchburg; Town of Medina; Town of Montrose; Town of Oregon; Town of Pleasant Springs; Town of Rutland; Town of Sun Prairie; Town of Verona; Town of Windsor; Town of York
William Robert Taylor	Dem.		12th	1859	Eastern Dane County: Town of Albion; Town of Blooming Grove; Town of Bristol; Town of Burke; Town of Christiana; Town of Cottage Grove; Town of Deerfield; Town of Dunkirk; Town of Dunn; Town of Fitchburg; Town of Medina; Town of Montrose; Town of Oregon; Town of Pleasant Springs; Town of Rutland; Town of Sun Prairie; Town of Verona; Town of Windsor; Town of York
William Robert Taylor	Dem.		13th	1860	Eastern Dane County: Town of Albion; Town of Blooming Grove; Town of Bristol; Town of Burke; Town of Christiana; Town of Cottage Grove; Town of Deerfield; Town of Dunkirk; Town of Dunn; Town of Fitchburg; Town of Medina; Town of Montrose; Town of Oregon; Town of Pleasant Springs; Town of Rutland; Town of Sun Prairie; Town of Verona; Town of Windsor; Town of York
Samuel C. Bean	Rep.		14th	1861	Eastern Dane County: Town of Albion; Town of Blooming Grove; Town of Bristol; Town of Burke; Town of Christiana; Town of Cottage Grove; Town of Deerfield; Town of Dunkirk; Town of Dunn; Town of Fitchburg; Town of Medina; Town of Montrose; Town of Oregon; Town of Pleasant Springs; Town of Rutland; Town of Sun Prairie; Town of Verona; Town of Windsor; Town of York
Samuel C. Bean	Rep.		15th	1862	1862–1865 1866–1870 Eastern Dane County: Town of Albion; Town of Blooming Grove; Town of Bristol; Town of Burke; Town of Christiana; Town of Cottage Grove; Town of Deerfield; Town of Dunkirk; Town of Dunn; Town of Medina; Town of Pleasant Springs; Town of Rutland; Town of Sun Prairie; Town of Vienna; Town of Westport; Town of Windsor; Town of York
Willard H. Chandler	Rep.		16th	1863	1862–1865 1866–1870 Eastern Dane County: Town of Albion; Town of Blooming Grove; Town of Bristol; Town of Burke; Town of Christiana; Town of Cottage Grove; Town of Deerfield; Town of Dunkirk; Town of Dunn; Town of Medina; Town of Pleasant Springs; Town of Rutland; Town of Sun Prairie; Town of Vienna; Town of Westport; Town of Windsor; Town of York
Willard H. Chandler	Rep.		17th	1864	1862–1865 1866–1870 Eastern Dane County: Town of Albion; Town of Blooming Grove; Town of Bristol; Town of Burke; Town of Christiana; Town of Cottage Grove; Town of Deerfield; Town of Dunkirk; Town of Dunn; Town of Medina; Town of Pleasant Springs; Town of Rutland; Town of Sun Prairie; Town of Vienna; Town of Westport; Town of Windsor; Town of York
Willard H. Chandler	Natl. Union		18th	1865	1862–1865 1866–1870 Eastern Dane County: Town of Albion; Town of Blooming Grove; Town of Bristol; Town of Burke; Town of Christiana; Town of Cottage Grove; Town of Deerfield; Town of Dunkirk; Town of Dunn; Town of Medina; Town of Pleasant Springs; Town of Rutland; Town of Sun Prairie; Town of Vienna; Town of Westport; Town of Windsor; Town of York
Willard H. Chandler	Natl. Union		19th	1866	1862–1865 1866–1870 Eastern Dane County: Town of Albion; Town of Blooming Grove; Town of Bristol; Town of Burke; Town of Christiana; Town of Cottage Grove; Town of Deerfield; Town of Dunkirk; Town of Dunn; Town of Medina; Town of Pleasant Springs; Town of Rutland; Town of Sun Prairie; Town of Vienna; Town of Westport; Town of Windsor; Town of York
Clement Warner	Natl. Union		20th	1867	1862–1865 1866–1870 Eastern Dane County: Town of Albion; Town of Blooming Grove; Town of Bristol; Town of Burke; Town of Christiana; Town of Cottage Grove; Town of Deerfield; Town of Dunkirk; Town of Dunn; Town of Medina; Town of Pleasant Springs; Town of Rutland; Town of Sun Prairie; Town of Vienna; Town of Westport; Town of Windsor; Town of York
Clement Warner	Rep.		21st	1868	1862–1865 1866–1870 Eastern Dane County: Town of Albion; Town of Blooming Grove; Town of Bristol; Town of Burke; Town of Christiana; Town of Cottage Grove; Town of Deerfield; Town of Dunkirk; Town of Dunn; Town of Medina; Town of Pleasant Springs; Town of Rutland; Town of Sun Prairie; Town of Vienna; Town of Westport; Town of Windsor; Town of York
Nelson Williams	Rep.		22nd	1869	1862–1865 1866–1870 Eastern Dane County: Town of Albion; Town of Blooming Grove; Town of Bristol; Town of Burke; Town of Christiana; Town of Cottage Grove; Town of Deerfield; Town of Dunkirk; Town of Dunn; Town of Medina; Town of Pleasant Springs; Town of Rutland; Town of Sun Prairie; Town of Vienna; Town of Westport; Town of Windsor; Town of York
Nelson Williams	Rep.		23rd	1870	1862–1865 1866–1870 Eastern Dane County: Town of Albion; Town of Blooming Grove; Town of Bristol; Town of Burke; Town of Christiana; Town of Cottage Grove; Town of Deerfield; Town of Dunkirk; Town of Dunn; Town of Medina; Town of Pleasant Springs; Town of Rutland; Town of Sun Prairie; Town of Vienna; Town of Westport; Town of Windsor; Town of York
William M. Colladay	Rep.	Redistricted to 7th district.	24th	1871	1862–1865 1866–1870 Eastern Dane County: Town of Albion; Town of Blooming Grove; Town of Bristol; Town of Burke; Town of Christiana; Town of Cottage Grove; Town of Deerfield; Town of Dunkirk; Town of Dunn; Town of Medina; Town of Pleasant Springs; Town of Rutland; Town of Sun Prairie; Town of Vienna; Town of Westport; Town of Windsor; Town of York
Henry S. Magoon	Rep.	Redistricted from 13th district.	25th	1872	Lafayette County
Francis Campbell	Rep.		26th	1873	Lafayette County
Francis Campbell	Rep.		27th	1874	Lafayette County
Francis Campbell	Rep.		28th	1875	Lafayette County
Francis Campbell	Rep.		29th	1876	Lafayette County
Thomas B. Scott	Rep.	Redistricted from 29th district.	30th	1877	Chippewa, Clark, Lincoln, Taylor, Wood counties
Thomas B. Scott	Rep.	Redistricted from 29th district.	31st	1878	Chippewa, Clark, Lincoln, Taylor, Wood counties
Thomas B. Scott	Rep.	Redistricted from 29th district.	32nd	1879	Chippewa, Clark, Lincoln, Taylor, Wood counties
Thomas B. Scott	Rep.	Redistricted from 29th district.	33rd	1880	Chippewa, Clark, Lincoln, Taylor, Wood counties
Thomas B. Scott	Rep.	Redistricted from 29th district.	34th	1881	Chippewa, Clark, Lincoln, Taylor, Wood counties
Thomas B. Scott	Rep.	Redistricted from 29th district.	35th	1882	Chippewa, Clark, Lincoln, Taylor, Wood counties
Charles M. Webb	Rep.	Resigned Apr. 1883, appointed Wisconsin circuit court judge.	36th	1883–1884	Ashland, Clark, Lincoln, Price, Taylor, Wood counties
Vacant			36th	1883–1884	Ashland, Clark, Lincoln, Price, Taylor, Wood counties
Merritt C. Ring	Rep.	Won 1884 special election.	37th	1885–1886	Ashland, Clark, Lincoln, Price, Taylor, Wood counties
George F. Merrill	Rep.		38th	1887–1888	Ashland, Clark, Lincoln, Price, Taylor, Wood counties
George F. Merrill	Rep.		39th	1889–1890	Ashland, Florence, Forest, Langlade, Lincoln, Oneida, Price, Taylor counties
John T. Kingston	Dem.		40th	1891–1892	Ashland, Florence, Forest, Langlade, Lincoln, Oneida, Price, Taylor counties
John T. Kingston	Dem.		41st	1893–1894	Ashland, Bayfield, Burnett, Douglas, Sawyer, Washburn counties
Thomas B. Mills	Rep.		42nd	1895–1896	Ashland, Bayfield, Burnett, Douglas, Sawyer, Washburn counties
Thomas B. Mills	Rep.		43rd	1897–1898	1896–1901 1902–1911; Burnett, Douglas, Polk counties
Edgar G. Mills	Rep.		44th	1899–1900	1896–1901 1902–1911; Burnett, Douglas, Polk counties
Edgar G. Mills	Rep.		45th	1901–1902	1896–1901 1902–1911; Burnett, Douglas, Polk counties
George Hudnall	Rep.		46th	1903–1904	1896–1901 1902–1911; Burnett, Douglas, Polk counties
George Hudnall	Rep.		47th	1905–1906	1896–1901 1902–1911; Burnett, Douglas, Polk counties
George Hudnall	Rep.		48th	1907–1908	1896–1901 1902–1911; Burnett, Douglas, Polk counties
George Hudnall	Rep.		49th	1909–1910	1896–1901 1902–1911; Burnett, Douglas, Polk counties
Victor Linley	Rep.		50th	1911–1912	1896–1901 1902–1911; Burnett, Douglas, Polk counties
Victor Linley	Rep.		51st	1913–1914	Burnett, Douglas, Washburn counties
Fred A. Baxter	Rep.		52nd	1915–1916	Burnett, Douglas, Washburn counties
Fred A. Baxter	Rep.		53rd	1917–1918	Burnett, Douglas, Washburn counties
Ray J. Nye	Rep.		54th	1919–1920	Burnett, Douglas, Washburn counties
Ray J. Nye	Rep.		55th	1921–1922	Burnett, Douglas, Washburn counties
Vacant (Note: Republican Ole G. Kinney was elected in 1922 but died before taking office.)			56th	1923–1924	Bayfield, Burnett, Douglas, Washburn counties
Marcus A. Kemp	Rep.	Won 1923 special election.	56th	1923–1924	Bayfield, Burnett, Douglas, Washburn counties
Marcus A. Kemp	Rep.	Won 1923 special election.	57th	1925–1926	Bayfield, Burnett, Douglas, Washburn counties
R. Bruce Johnson	Rep.		58th	1927–1928	Bayfield, Burnett, Douglas, Washburn counties
R. Bruce Johnson	Rep.		59th	1929–1930	Bayfield, Burnett, Douglas, Washburn counties
Philip E. Nelson	Rep.		60th	1931–1932	Bayfield, Burnett, Douglas, Washburn counties
Philip E. Nelson	Rep.		61st	1933–1934	Bayfield, Burnett, Douglas, Washburn counties
Philip E. Nelson	Rep.		62nd	1935–1936	Bayfield, Burnett, Douglas, Washburn counties
Philip E. Nelson	Prog.		63rd	1937–1938	Bayfield, Burnett, Douglas, Washburn counties
Philip E. Nelson	Prog.		64th	1939–1940	Bayfield, Burnett, Douglas, Washburn counties
Philip E. Nelson	Prog.		65th	1941–1942	Bayfield, Burnett, Douglas, Washburn counties
Elmer Peterson	Prog.		66th	1943–1944	Bayfield, Burnett, Douglas, Washburn counties
Elmer Peterson	Prog.		67th	1945–1946	Bayfield, Burnett, Douglas, Washburn counties
Arthur Lenroot Jr.	Rep.		68th	1947–1948	Bayfield, Burnett, Douglas, Washburn counties
Arthur Lenroot Jr.	Rep.		69th	1949–1950	Bayfield, Burnett, Douglas, Washburn counties
Arthur Lenroot Jr.	Rep.		70th	1951–1952	Bayfield, Burnett, Douglas, Washburn counties
Arthur Lenroot Jr.	Rep.		71st	1953–1954	Bayfield, Burnett, Douglas, Washburn counties
Richard J. Zaborski	Dem.		72nd	1955–1956	Central Milwaukee County: Wards 4, 8, 16, city of Milwaukee
Richard J. Zaborski	Dem.		73rd	1957–1958	Central Milwaukee County: Wards 4, 8, 16, city of Milwaukee
Richard J. Zaborski	Dem.		74th	1959–1960	Central Milwaukee County: Wards 4, 8, 16, city of Milwaukee
Richard J. Zaborski	Dem.		75th	1961–1962	Central Milwaukee County: Wards 4, 8, 16, city of Milwaukee
Richard J. Zaborski	Dem.		76th	1963–1964	Central Milwaukee County: Wards 4, 8, 16, city of Milwaukee
Richard J. Zaborski	Dem.		77th	1965–1966	Central Milwaukee County: Wards 8, 10, 16, city of Milwaukee
Wayne F. Whittow	Dem.	Resigned in 1976.	78th	1967–1968	Central Milwaukee County: Wards 8, 10, 16, city of Milwaukee
Wayne F. Whittow	Dem.	Resigned in 1976.	79th	1969–1970	Central Milwaukee County: Wards 8, 10, 16, city of Milwaukee
Wayne F. Whittow	Dem.	Resigned in 1976.	80th	1971–1972	Central Milwaukee County: Wards 8, 10, 16, city of Milwaukee
Wayne F. Whittow	Dem.	Resigned in 1976.	81st	1973–1974	Central Milwaukee County: part of the city of Milwaukee; part of the city of West Allis
Wayne F. Whittow	Dem.	Resigned in 1976.	82nd	1975–1976	Central Milwaukee County: part of the city of Milwaukee; part of the city of West Allis
Warren Braun	Dem.	Won 1976 special election.	83rd	1977–1978	Central Milwaukee County: part of the city of Milwaukee; part of the city of West Allis
Warren Braun	Dem.	Won 1976 special election.	84th	1979–1980	Central Milwaukee County: part of the city of Milwaukee; part of the city of West Allis
Warren Braun	Dem.	Won 1976 special election.	85th	1981–1982	Central Milwaukee County: part of the city of Milwaukee; part of the city of West Allis
J. Mac Davis	Rep.	Resigned July 1990, appointed Wisconsin circuit court judge.	86th	1983–1984	Southeast Jefferson County, part of Walworth County, part of Washington County, & western Waukesha County: Jefferson County; Town of Palmyra; Town of Sullivan; Village of Palmyra; Walworth County; Town of La Grange; Town of Whitewater; Washington County; Town of Erin; Waukesha County; Town of Delafield; Town of Eagle; Town of Genesee; Town of Merton; Town of Mukwonago; Town of Oconomowoc; Town of Ottawa; Town of Summit; Town of Waukesha; Village of Chenequa; Village of Dousman; Village of Eagle; Village of Hartland; Village of Lac La Belle; Village of Merton; Village of Mukwonago; Village of North Prairie; Village of Oconomowoc Lake; Village of Wales; City of Delafield; City of Oconomowoc; City of Waukesha; Wards 3-14, town of Pewaukee
J. Mac Davis	Rep.	Resigned July 1990, appointed Wisconsin circuit court judge.	87th	1985–1986	Southeast Jefferson County, part of Washington County, & western Waukesha County: Jefferson County; Town of Concord; Town of Palmyra; Town of Sullivan; Village of Palmyra; Village of Sullivan; Washington County; Town of Richfield; Waukesha County; Town of Delafield; Town of Eagle; Town of Genesee; Town of Merton; Town of Oconomowoc; Town of Ottawa; Town of Pewaukee; Town of Summit; Town of Waukesha; Village of Chenequa; Village of Dousman; Village of Eagle; Village of Hartland; Village of Lac La Belle; Village of Merton; Village of Mukwonago; Village of North Prairie; Village of Oconomowoc Lake; Village of Pewaukee; Village of Wales; City of Delafield; City of Oconomowoc; Wards 3, 5, 6, 7, town of Brookfield; Wards 1, 7-13, town of Lisbon; Wards 1, 2, 3, 5, 6, town of Mukwonago; Wards 12, 13, 24, city of New Berlin; Wards 1, 7, 9-12, 14, 19, 22-31, city of Waukesha
J. Mac Davis	Rep.	Resigned July 1990, appointed Wisconsin circuit court judge.	88th	1987–1988	
J. Mac Davis	Rep.	Resigned July 1990, appointed Wisconsin circuit court judge.	89th	1989–1990	
Joanne Huelsman	Rep.		90th	1991–1992	
Joanne Huelsman	Rep.		91st	1993–1994	Southeast Jefferson County, part of Rock County, part of Walworth County, part of Washington County, & western Waukesha County: Jefferson County; Town of Cold Spring; Town of Concord; Town of Hebron; Town of Palmyra; Town of Sullivan; Village of Palmyra; Village of Sullivan; City of Whitewater; Wards 1, 2, town of Jefferson; Rock County; Town of Lima; City of Milton; Ward 1, town of Milton; Walworth County; Town of Whitewater; Village of Mukwonago; City of Whitewater; Washington County; Town of Erin; Ward 5, town of Richfield; Waukesha County; Town of Delafield; Town of Eagle; Town of Merton; Town of Mukwonago; Town of Ottawa; Town of Summit; Village of Chenequa; Village of Dousman; Village of Eagle; Village of Hartland; Village of Merton; Village of Mukwonago; Village of Nashotah; Village of North Prairie; Village of Wales; City of Delafield; Wards 2-8, town of Brookfield; Wards 1-4, 7, town of Genessee; Wards 2, 8-12, town of Lisbon; Wards 7, 8, town of Pewaukee; Wards 2-5, town of Vernon; Wards 2-5, 7, 8, town of Waukesha; Wards 1-16, 23-27, city of Waukesha
Joanne Huelsman	Rep.		92nd	1995–1996	
Joanne Huelsman	Rep.		93rd	1997–1998	
Joanne Huelsman	Rep.		94th	1999–2000	
Joanne Huelsman	Rep.		95th	2001–2002	
Neal Kedzie	Rep.		96th	2003–2004	Southeast Jefferson County, part of Kenosha County, most of Walworth County, & western Waukesha County: Jefferson County; Town of Cold Spring; Town of Concord; Town of Farmington; Town of Hebron; Town of Palmyra; Town of Sullivan; Village of Johnson Creek; Village of Palmyra; Village of Sullivan; Kenosha County; Town of Wheatland; Walworth County; Town of Bloomfield; Town of Darien; Town of Delavan; Town of Geneva; Town of Lafayetrte; Town of La Grange; Town of Linn; Town of Lyons; Town of Sharon; Town of Spring Prairie; Town of Sugar Creek; Town of Troy; Town of Walworth; Village of Darien; Village of Fontana-on-Geneva Lake; Village of Genoa City; Village of Sharon; Village of Walworth; Village of Williams Bay; City of Delavan; City of Lake Geneva; City of Elkhorn; Waukesha County; Town of Delafield; Town of Eagle; Town of Genesee; Town of Ottawa; Town of Summit; Village of Chenequa; Village of Dousman; Village of Eagle; Village of Hartland; Village of Nashotah; Village of North Prairie; Village of Wales; Village of Oconomowoc Lake; City of Delafield; Wards 1, 2, 4-10, town of Mukwonago; Wards 3, 7, 8, town of Waukesha; Wards 7-13, city of Oconomowoc; Ward 7, city of Pewaukee; Wards 8, 10-15, city of Waukesha
Neal Kedzie	Rep.		97th	2005–2006	
Neal Kedzie	Rep.		98th	2007–2008	
Neal Kedzie	Rep.		99th	2009–2010	
Neal Kedzie	Rep.		100th	2011–2012	
Neal Kedzie	Rep.		101st	2013–2014	Most of Walworth County southwest Waukesha County southern Jefferson County eastern Rock County part of Kenosha County
Stephen Nass	Rep.		102nd	2015–2016	Most of Walworth County southwest Waukesha County southern Jefferson County eastern Rock County part of Kenosha County
Stephen Nass	Rep.		103rd	2017–2018	Most of Walworth County southwest Waukesha County southern Jefferson County eastern Rock County part of Kenosha County
Stephen Nass	Rep.		104th	2019–2020	Most of Walworth County southwest Waukesha County southern Jefferson County eastern Rock County part of Kenosha County
Stephen Nass	Rep.		105th	2021–2022	Most of Walworth County southwest Waukesha County southern Jefferson County eastern Rock County part of Kenosha County
Stephen Nass	Rep.		106th	2023–2024	Most of Walworth County, southern Jefferson County, eastern Rock County, part of Kenosha County
Stephen Nass	Rep.		107th	2025–2026	
