= John E. Johnson (Utica) =

American politician

John E. Johnson (a.k.a. Johannes Johnson, 1829 – after 1909) of Utica, Wisconsin, was an American farmer and politician.

== Family ==
Johnson was born in Norway in 1829, the son of Erick Johnson Ytre Lie (c. 1802–1892) and Martha Larsdatter Johnson (c. 1797 – 1873). His family immigrated from Aurland Municipality, Norway to the United States in 1845. In 1866 he married Martha Venaas (1844–1883), with whom he had five children. Johnson was still living at the family homestead two miles east of Utica with his brother Haakon (1835–1911) in 1909.

== Career ==
Johnson served as a Republican member of the Wisconsin State Assembly for 1869 from the 1st Dane County Assembly district (the Towns of Albion, Dunkirk, Rutland, Dunn, Pleasant Springs, Christiana, Cottage Grove and Blooming Grove), succeeding Nelson Williams (also a Republican), who had successfully run for the Wisconsin State Senate. He was not a candidate for re-election, and was succeeded by fellow Republican Carpus Loveland.

He is not to be confused with the John A. Johnson from Madison who served in 1857 from Dane County, the John Johnson who served in 1874 from Dane County, or the John E. Johnson from Brandon who served four terms in the Assembly in the early 20th century.

== Background ==
A native of Norway, Johnson was 39 when he served in the Assembly. He was assigned to the standing committee on school and university lands.
