= Carpus Loveland =

American politician (1828–1912)

Carpus E. Loveland (December 16, 1828 – November 7, 1912) was an American farmer from Rutland, Wisconsin, who served one term as a Republican member of the Wisconsin State Assembly and held various local offices in his home state of New York and in Wisconsin.

Loveland was born December 16, 1828, in the town of Adams in Jefferson County, New York. He received a public school education, and became a farmer.

== Public office ==
Loveland served as Town Clerk of Adams in 1850. He came to Wisconsin in 1854 and settled in Rutland. After coming to Wisconsin, he served as a supervisor for Rutland in 1857, and was elected Town Chairman (equivalent to mayor) in 1859. He was elected justice of the peace in 1861, and re-elected in 1863; again elected Chairman in 1869. In the 1869 general election he was chosen to represent the first Dane County assembly district (the Towns of Albion, Dunkirk, Rutland, Dunn, Pleasant Springs, Christiana, Cottage Grove and Blooming Grove, with 646 votes to 544 for John M. Estes, an "Independent Republican"., succeeding John E. Johnson, who was not a candidate. He was assigned to the standing committee on privileges and elections. He was not a candidate for re-election in 1870, and was succeeded by fellow Republican Lemuel Oscar Humphrey.

He was an unsuccessful candidate for the Assembly in 1873, losing in the new 4th Dane County Assembly district, with 786 votes to 1,135 for Democrat Michael Johnson. As town chairman he was ex officio a member of the Dane County, Wisconsin Board of Supervisors.

== Family ==
He married Emily L. Colvin before they moved to Wisconsin. Their son, Austin Roscoe Loveland (1854–1909), was born in Rutland; he became postmaster of Oregon, Wisconsin in 1897.
