= Ole K. Roe House =

Historic house in Wisconsin, United States

- U.S. National Register of Historic Places
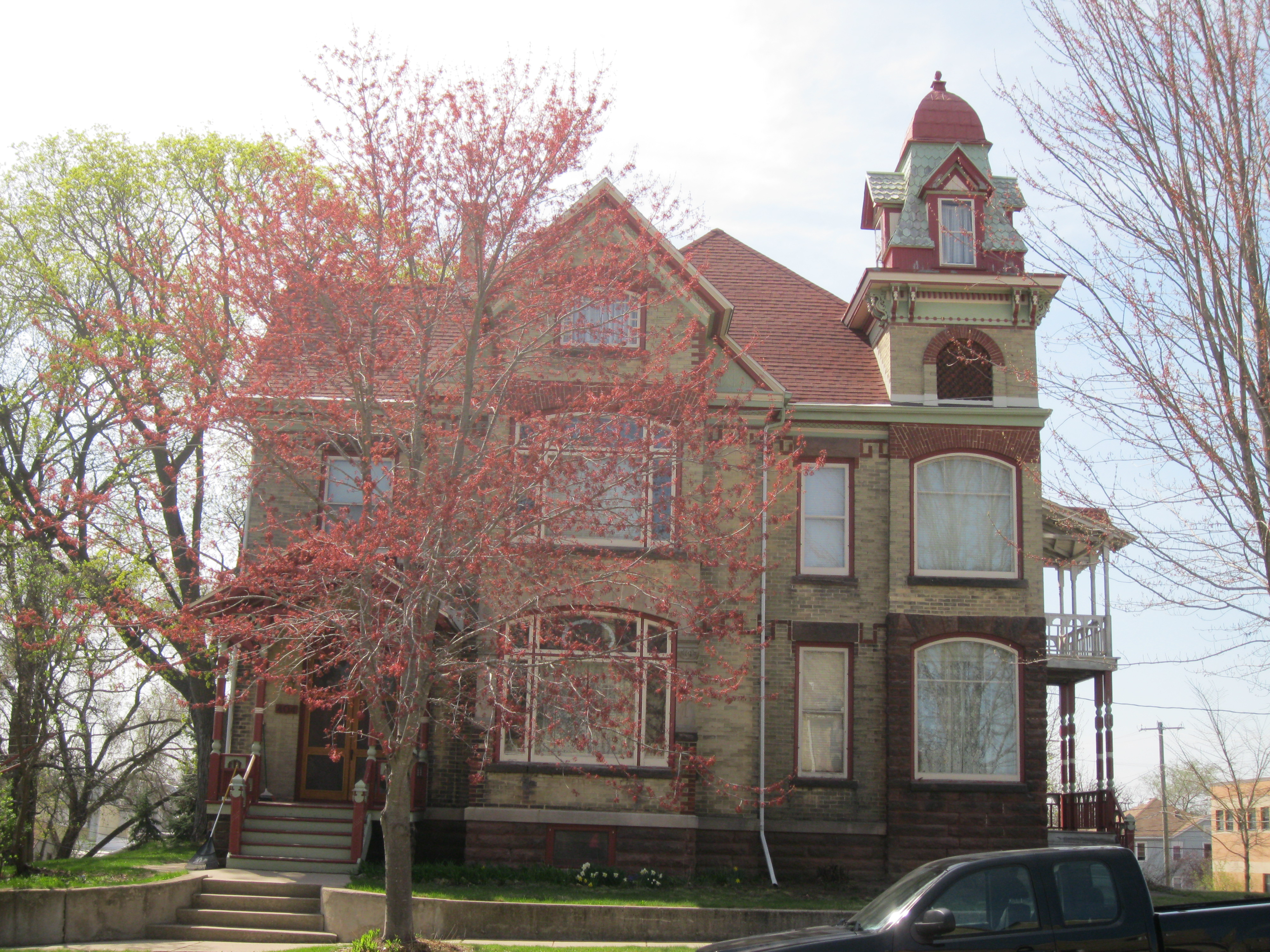
- Ole K. Roe House
- Location: 404 S. 5th St., Stoughton, Wisconsin
- Coordinates: 42°54′56″N 89°13′44″W
- Area: 0.4 acres (0.16 ha)
- Built: 1892
- Architectural style: Queen Anne
- NRHP reference No.: 84003652
- Added to NRHP: September 7, 1984

The Ole K. Roe House is a large Queen Anne-styled house built in 1892 in Stoughton, Wisconsin for one of the city's leading tobacco merchants and a civic leader. In 1984 the house was listed on the National Register of Historic Places.

== History ==
Ole K. Roe was born in 1851 in the town Pleasant Springs, where his parents were the first White settlers. Ole farmed there and dealt in tobacco until 1888, when he moved to Stoughton and went full time into tobacco trading. Over the years he owned three different tobacco warehouses in Stoughton and was one of the prominent dealers in the city, which was one of the centers of tobacco production in the state. In 1890 Ole was elected alderman, in 1896 mayor of Stoughton, and in 1900 a state legislator.

In 1889, a year after moving to Stoughton, Ole bought the lot on which the house stands. He had the prior residence moved, and in 1891 commenced to build what was called by The Stoughton Hub "one of the finest residences in the city." The house is 2.5 stories, with a square corner tower. The walls are brick - the only remaining brick Queen Anne house in Stoughton. They are cream brick, accented with red brick and cut red sandstone. The elaborate tower is topped with a bell cast dome. Many of the windows have rounded tops; some have colored panes, and two have shell motifs and glass jewels. The east porch is the original spindle woodwork design. The two-story stucco porch on the north is from 1912 to 1926, replacing an earlier porch similar to that on the east. Inside are two marble fireplaces, pocket doors, inglenooks, and many door and window moldings are decorated with a tobacco-leaf motif.

In 1905, Ole had a stroke while returning on the train from a business trip to Rice Lake. He died in 1912. His son Carl and his family moved into the house with Roe's wife and the house stayed in the family until the late 1930s.
