= Victor Linley =

20th century American politician

Member of the Wisconsin Senate from the 11th district
- In office January 2, 1911 – January 4, 1915
- Preceded by: George Hudnall
- Succeeded by: Fred A. Baxter

12th Mayor of Superior, Wisconsin
- In office April 1906 – April 1908
- Preceded by: Charles N. O'Hare
- Succeeded by: Frank R. Krumpton

Personal details
- Born: September 5, 1865 Atchison, Kansas, U.S.
- Died: November 19, 1915 (aged 50) Cincinnati, Ohio, U.S.
- Resting place: Calvary Cemetery, Superior, Wisconsin
- Party: Republican
- Spouse: Kathryn McDonough (m. 1898–1915)
- Children: Victor Linley Jr.; (b. 1903; died 1945)
- Profession: Lawyer

Victor Linley Sr. (September 5, 1865 – November 19, 1915) was an American lawyer and Republican politician. He was the 11th mayor of Superior, Wisconsin, and represented northwest Wisconsin as a member of the Wisconsin Senate during the 1911 and 1913 sessions.

== Biography ==
Linley was born on September 5, 1865, in Atchison, Kansas. He was a lawyer by trade. Linley died on November 19, 1915.

== Political career ==
Linley was a member of the Senate during the 1911 and 1913 sessions. Previously, he was Mayor of Superior, Wisconsin from 1906 to 1908. He was a Republican.

Wisconsin Senate
Preceded by George Hudnall	Member of the Wisconsin Senate from the 11th district January 2, 1911 – January 4, 1915	Succeeded by Fred A. Baxter
Political offices
Preceded by Charles N. O'Hare	Mayor of Superior, Wisconsin; April 1906 – April 1908	Succeeded by Frank R. Krumpton
