= Fred A. Baxter =

20th century American politician

15th & 17th Mayor of Superior, Wisconsin
- In office April 1933 – April 1935
- Preceded by: George E. Dietrich
- Succeeded by: Bryn Ostby
- In office April 1918 – April 1929
- Preceded by: Joseph S. Konkel
- Succeeded by: George E. Dietrich

Member of the Wisconsin Senate from the 11th district
- In office January 4, 1915 – January 6, 1919
- Preceded by: Victor Linley
- Succeeded by: Ray J. Nye

Personal details
- Born: April 16, 1868 Watertown, Wisconsin, U.S.
- Died: March 15, 1942 (aged 73) Superior, Wisconsin, U.S.
- Resting place: Greenwood Cemetery, Superior
- Party: Republican
- Spouse: none
- Children: none
- Occupation: General contractor

Fred A. Baxter (April 16, 1868 – March 15, 1942) was an American general contractor and Republican politician from Superior, Wisconsin. He was a member of the Wisconsin Senate, representing the 11th Senate district during the 1915–1916 and 1917–1918 sessions. He was also the 15th and 17th mayor of Superior, serving 13 years in that office.

== Biography ==
Fred Baxter was born in Watertown, Wisconsin, on April 16, 1868. After receiving a basic education, he went to work with his father as a contractor in Watertown. In 1898, the family moved north to Superior, Wisconsin, where his father died and Fred took over the contracting business in partnership with his brother. Many of their early contracts were in railroad construction, and the brothers made substantial profits, at one point employing more than 500 men in their business.

In 1914, he was elected to the Wisconsin Senate, running in the 11th State Senate district. He defeated Democrat R. J. Shields with 58% of the vote.

He was elected mayor of Superior in 1918, and then did not seek re-election to the Senate later that year. He was subsequently re-elected as mayor in 1922 and 1926. His third mayoral term would have lasted until 1930, but in 1928, the voters of Superior elected to change the form of government and a new mayoral election was held in April 1929, in which Baxter was defeated by George E. Dietrich. Baxter challenged Dietrich again in 1931 in an attempt to reclaim his office, but was defeated again. Baxter ran again in 1933, and was elected to a final two-year term as mayor. Baxter ran for re-election in 1935, but was defeated by his 1933 opponent, Bryn Ostby.

Baxter died at his home in Superior on March 15, 1942, after suffering from a bout of pneumonia.

Wisconsin Senate
| Preceded by Victor Linley | Member of the Wisconsin Senate from the 11th district January 4, 1915 – January 6, 1919 | Succeeded by Ray J. Nye |
Political offices
| Preceded by Joseph S. Konkel | Mayor of Superior, Wisconsin; April 1918 – April 1929 | Succeeded by George E. Dietrich |
| Preceded by George E. Dietrich | Mayor of Superior, Wisconsin; April 1933 – April 1935 | Succeeded by Bryn Ostby |
