= William M. Colladay =

19th century American politician

Member of the Wisconsin Senate
- In office January 1, 1872 – January 6, 1873
- Preceded by: Philo Belden
- Succeeded by: John Anders Johnson
- Constituency: 7th Senate district
- In office January 2, 1871 – January 1, 1872
- Preceded by: Nelson Williams
- Succeeded by: Henry S. Magoon
- Constituency: 11th Senate district

Member of the Wisconsin State Assembly
- In office January 2, 1865 – January 1, 1866
- Preceded by: William W. Blackman
- Succeeded by: William D. Potter
- Constituency: Dane 1st district
- In office January 7, 1856 – January 5, 1857
- Preceded by: Samuel G. Abbott
- Succeeded by: Robert P. Main
- Constituency: Dane 3rd district

Personal details
- Born: April 12, 1809 Germantown, Pennsylvania, U.S.
- Died: September 26, 1893 (aged 84) Dunn, Dane County, Wisconsin, U.S.
- Resting place: Riverside Cemetery, Stoughton, Wisconsin
- Party: Republican; Nat'l Union (1860s)
- Spouse: Mary Ann Kirk (m. 1832; died 1876)
- Children: Amanda Colladay^{(b. 1833; died 1834)}; John B. Colladay^{(b. 1836; died 1865)}; Sarah Ann Colladay^{(b. 1838; died 1841)}; Emma Jane (Camp)^{(b. 1840; died 1915)}; George W. Colladay^{(b. 1843; died 1862)}; Theadore A. Colladay^{(b. 1844; died 1881)}; Alva W. Colladay^{(b. 1846; died 1914)}; Forrest Henry Colladay^{(b. 1848; died 1934)}; Elvira A. (Bean)^{(b. 1850; died 1918)}; Alice A. (Keenan)^{(b. 1852; died 1943)}; William E. Colladay^{(b. 1854)}; Dora Aurelia (Moore)^{(b. 1856; died 1943)}; Charles M. Colladay^{(b. 1858; died 1948)}
- Occupation: carpenter, farmer

William McLean Colladay (April 12, 1809 – September 26, 1893) was an American carpenter, farmer, Republican politician, and Wisconsin pioneer. He served in the Wisconsin State Senate and State Assembly, representing eastern Dane County. He was the first permanent American settler in the town of Dunn, Dane County, Wisconsin.

== Biography ==
William M. Colladay was born on April 12, 1809, in Germantown, Pennsylvania. He was raised and educated in Pennsylvania, but traveled to Upper Canada shortly in the 1830s. He soon returned to the United States, moving to Illinois, where he worked for several years as a mail carrier between Chicago and Aurora, Illinois. In the mid-1840s, Colladay moved to the Wisconsin Territory and settled land in what is now the town of Dunn, in Dane County.

In the spring after his arrival, he obtained work as a carpenter in the neighboring settlement of Stoughton, walking the six mile commute each morning and evening. He constructed the first frame house in Stoughton, the first bridge across the Rock River between Madison and Janesville, and the first saw and grist mills in southeast Dane County.

After satisfying the requirements of the Homestead Law, he settled down on his land in Dunn and began cultivating it for farming, which was his principle occupation for the rest of his life. Through his success, he expanded his estate to about 500 acres.

Colladay became involved in local affairs as a justice of the peace, and joined the Republican Party when it was organized in the 1850s. He was elected to the Wisconsin State Assembly twice, serving in the 1856 and 1865 sessions. He was later elected to a two-year term in the Wisconsin State Senate, serving in the 1871 and 1872 sessions. In the Senate, he was originally elected in the 11th Senate district, but in the 1871 redistricting, his district was renumbered as the 7th Senate district, though the boundaries of his district were only slightly changed.

Colladay died on September 26, 1893, at his home at "Colladay's Point" on Lake Kegonsa.

== Personal life and family ==
William M. Colladay was the youngest child of Charles Colladay and his wife Ann (née McLain).

William Colladay married Mary Ann Kirk on May 29, 1832. His wife accompanied him on all of his travels to Canada, Illinois, and finally settling in Wisconsin. They had thirteen children, but two died in infancy. Their seventh child, Alva, was said to be the first white child born in the town of Dunn. Mary Ann Colladay died in 1876.

Three of Colladay's sons volunteered as musicians for the 11th Wisconsin Infantry Regiment during the American Civil War. One of them, George, died of disease in 1862.

Colladay was also active in Freemasonry and the Independent Order of Odd Fellows. As a Mason, he saw to the creation of the Stoughton lodge by walking to Milwaukee and paying the fee to obtain a charter for the new lodge.

== Electoral history ==
=== Wisconsin Senate (1870) ===
Wisconsin Senate, 11th District Election, 1870
Party	Candidate	Votes	%	±%
General Election, November 8, 1870
Republican	William M. Colladay	1,679	55.49%	
Democratic	Jerome Yates	1,347	44.51%	
Plurality		332	10.97%	
Total votes		3,026	100.0%	
Republican hold				

Wisconsin State Assembly
Preceded by Samuel G. Abbott	Member of the Wisconsin State Assembly from the Dane 3rd district January 7, 1856 – January 5, 1857	Succeeded by Robert P. Main
Preceded by William W. Blackman	Member of the Wisconsin State Assembly from the Dane 1st district January 2, 1865 – January 1, 1866	Succeeded by William D. Potter
Wisconsin Senate
Preceded by Nelson Williams	Member of the Wisconsin Senate from the 11th district January 2, 1871 – January 1, 1872	Succeeded by Henry S. Magoon
Preceded by Philo Belden	Member of the Wisconsin Senate from the 7th district January 1, 1872 – January 6, 1873	Succeeded by John Anders Johnson
