= Henry Cullen Adams =

American politician (1850–1906)

Henry C. Adams
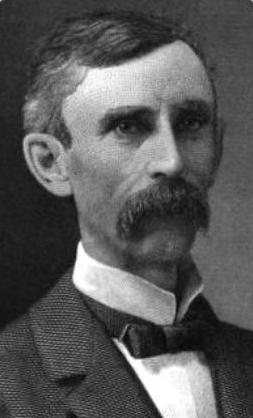

Member of the U.S. House of Representatives from Wisconsin's 2nd district
- In office March 4, 1903 – July 9, 1906
- Preceded by: Herman B. Dahle
- Succeeded by: John M. Nelson

Member of the Wisconsin State Assembly from the Dane 3rd district
- In office January 1, 1883 – January 1, 1887
- Preceded by: Francis Leander Warner
- Succeeded by: Richard D. Frost

Personal details
- Born: Henry Cullen Adams; November 28, 1850 Verona, New York, U.S.
- Died: July 9, 1906 (aged 55) Chicago, Illinois, U.S.
- Resting place: Forest Hill Cemetery, Madison, Wisconsin
- Party: Republican
- Spouses: Anna Burkley Norton; (m. 1878; died 1933)
- Children: Mabel Adams^{(b. 1883; died 1973)}; Carolyn (Chamberlain)^{(b. 1886; died 1965)}
- Parents: Benjamin Franklin Adams (father); Caroline M. (Shephard) Adams (mother)

Henry Cullen Adams (November 28, 1850 – July 9, 1906) was an American farmer, public administrator, and progressive Republican politician from Dane County, Wisconsin. He served the last three years of his life in the U.S. House of Representatives, representing Wisconsin's 2nd congressional district from 1903 until his death in 1906. In Congress, he was best known for his support of pure food laws—which protected the interests of Wisconsin dairy farmers.

== Biography ==
Adams was born in Verona, New York to Hamilton College professor Benjamin Franklin Adams and Caroline Shepard, but moved to his father's farm in Jefferson County, Wisconsin, when he was an infant. The family moved again a few years later to southeastern Dane County, Wisconsin. His father was elected to the Wisconsin State Assembly for that area and served in the Assembly in 1862 and 1872.

Adams attended Albion Academy and then the University of Wisconsin–Madison, but withdrew for health reasons before earning a degree.

=== Early career ===
After marrying Anne Burkley Norton in 1878, he operated a successful dairy and fruit farm and served as president of the Wisconsin Dairymen's Association.

He was elected to the Wisconsin State Assembly in 1882, representing the same geographic area that his father had represented, though the districts had been reapportioned. He was re-elected in 1883 and in 1884—the first year that Assemblymembers were elected to two-year terms. He left office in 1887 and became a member of the Wisconsin Board of Agriculture from 1887 to 95. He also held the offices of Wisconsin Superintendent of Public Property from 1889 to 1891, and Food and Dairy Commissioner from 1898 to 1902.

=== Congress ===
In 1902, Adams was elected to the United States House of Representatives from Wisconsin's 2nd congressional district. He served in the 58th United States Congress and was reelected to the 59th Congress serving until his death (March 4, 1903 - July 9, 1906). He was a progressive Republican and supporter of Robert M. "Fighting Bob" La Follette. In Congress, he worked for passage of the Federal Meat Inspection Act and the Pure Food and Drug Act.

=== Death and burial ===
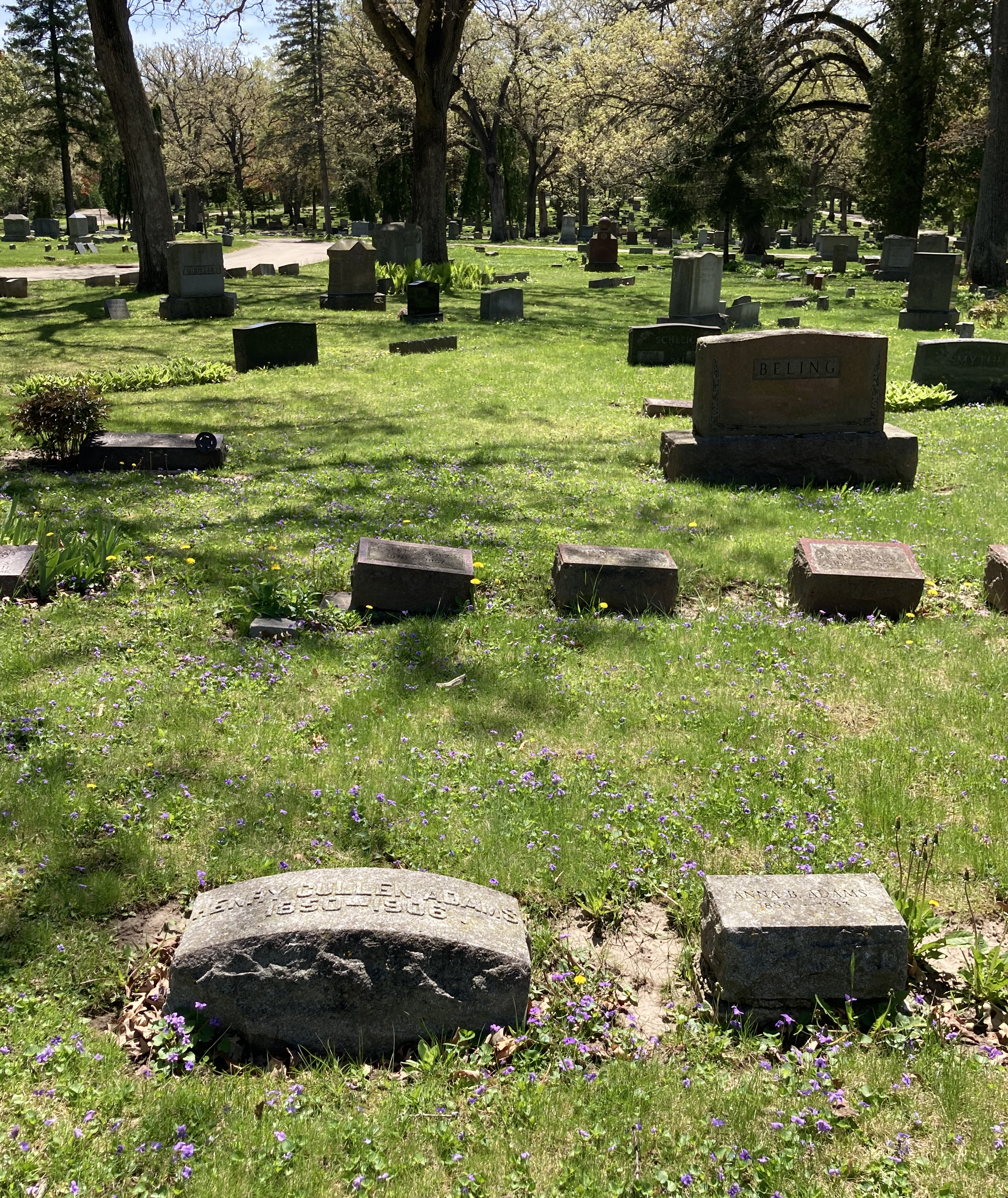
Adams's grave at Forest Hill Cemetery

He died of intestinal illness in 1906 in Chicago, while en route from Washington, D.C., to his home in Wisconsin. He was buried at Forest Hill Cemetery in Madison.

== See also ==
- List of members of the United States Congress who died in office (1900–1949)

== Sources ==
- United States Congress. "Henry Cullen Adams (id: A000037)". Biographical Directory of the United States Congress.
- American National Biography, vol. 1, p. 93.
- Wisconsin Historical Society biography Archived September 29, 2007, at the Wayback Machine
- Henry Cullen Adams, late a representative from Wisconsin, Memorial addresses delivered in the House of Representatives and Senate frontispiece 1907

U.S. House of Representatives
Preceded by Herman B. Dahle	Member of the U.S. House of Representatives from Wisconsin's 2nd congressional district March 4, 1903 – July 9, 1906	Succeeded by John M. Nelson
