= Ole K. Roe =

American politician (1851–1912)

Ole K. Roe (August 24, 1851 – August 26, 1912) was a member of the Wisconsin State Assembly.

== Biography ==
Roe was born to Norwegian immigrants on August 24, 1851, in Pleasant Springs, Wisconsin. On December 26, 1875, he married Toline "Lena" Felland. They had four children. Roe and his family were Lutherans.

After operating a farm in Pleasant Springs, Roe moved to Stoughton, Wisconsin in 1888, where he worked as a tobacco dealer. He died on August 26, 1912.

His former home, now known as the Ole K. Roe House, is listed on the National Register of Historic Places.

== Political career ==
Roe was a member of the Assembly during the 1901 session, representing the 2nd District of Dane County, Wisconsin. Previously, he had been treasurer of Pleasant Springs before being elected as an alderman and later mayor of Stoughton. He was a Republican.
