= Michael Johnson (Wisconsin politician) =

American politician (1832–1908)

Michael Johnson (January 4, 1832 – 11 February 1908) was an American farmer from Springdale, Wisconsin, who served as a member of the Wisconsin State Assembly from Dane County, as well as holding various local offices.

== Background ==
Johnson was born on January 4, 1832, in Sogn, in Bergen Stift, Norway. He moved to Windsor (town), Wisconsin, in 1853. In April 1853, he married Jone Nelson Hone, who died in June 1854. Johnson later moved to Vienna, Wisconsin, before settling in Springdale in 1856, where he bought 148 acres of land. In May of that year, he married Brita Samsonsdatter, born in 1835 in Norway. Brita died 19 April 1864, leaving him with two children. He was married once more, in March 1865, to Betsey T. Lee. They had six children together.

== Public office ==
When first elected to the Assembly in 1873 from the 4th Dane County Assembly district (towns of Blue Mounds, Fitchburg, Madison, Middleton, Montrose, Oregon, Perry, Primrose, Rutland, Springdale, and Verona), Johnson had been a justice of the peace for thirteen years and town treasurer for seven years. He had been elected town chairman in 1872 and re-elected in 1873 (as he would be through 1878; and again in 1881–82). As a town chairman, he was ex officio a member of the Dane County Board of Supervisors; for the 1877–78 term, he was chairman of the board.

Johnson was elected as a Democrat, with 1,135 votes to 786 for Republican former Assemblyman Carpus Loveland (Republican incumbent Hiram Cornwell was not a candidate), and was assigned to the standing committee on roads and bridges. He was re-elected in 1874 as part of the Reform Party (a coalition of Democrats, reform and Liberal Republicans, and Grangers formed in 1873, which secured the election of one Governor of Wisconsin and a number of state legislators) with 1,191 votes to 987 for former Republican Assemblyman Phineas Baldwin, and moved to the committee on assessment and collection of taxes. He was re-elected in 1875 as a Reformer, with 1,155 votes to 987 for Republican Halle Steensland; and moved to the committee on state affairs.

After a redistricting, he was once again re-elected in 1876 as a Reformer from the new 1st Dane County district (Towns of Berry, Black Earth, Blue Mounds, Cross Plains, Dane, Fitchburg, Mazomanie, Middleton, Montrose, Perry, Primrose, Roxbury, Springdale, Springfield, Verona, Vermont and Westport), with 2,681 votes to 1481 for Republican R. Cowdrey. He moved to the committee on state lands. With the Reform Party in dissolution, he did not seek re-election in 1877, and was succeeded by Democrat John Lyle.

== Personal life and later years ==
As of 1880, Johnson's farm in Springdale was 336 acres, with a two-story frame house and various improvements. In addition to farming, he raised livestock.

In 1881, he was the Democratic nominee for Secretary of State of Wisconsin, coming in second in the general election to Ernst Timme, with 70,141 votes to Timme's 83,071, 11,643 for Prohibitionist Edmund Bartlett, and 6,747 for Greenbacker Wilson Hopkins.

When it was proposed that Dane County create a separate insane asylum apart from the county's poor farm, Johnson was appointed as part of the commission which oversaw its construction (it opened in 1883) and became one of its trustees. In 1891–1892, he spent some time doing land appraisal of swampland in Crawford County which belonged to the state's school lands.

He was a presidential elector in 1892, voting for the successful Democratic ticket of Cleveland and Stevenson. In October 1893 the new president appointed Johnson assistant revenue collector for the second district of Wisconsin; he continued in that job until the end of January 1900.

Johnson was an active member of the Norwegian Evangelical Lutheran Church, repeatedly representing his home congregation in the synod; he was elected to the synod's governing council twice, serving for six years. By the time he retired from farming in March 1893, selling his farm in Springdale and moving to Mount Horeb, he had been a justice of the peace for 26 years. He died 11 February 1908 in Mount Horeb.
