= John Lyle (state representative) =

American politician (1835–1907)

John T. Lyle Jr. (May 7, 1835 – April 21, 1907) was an American farmer from Montrose, Wisconsin, who served as a member of the Wisconsin State Assembly and as chairman of his town.

== Background ==
Lyle was born on May 7, 1835, in Houston, Scotland, son of John Lyle and Mary Holmes. He was schooled in Bridge of Weir, and moved to the United States in 1843 with his father and stepmother, who settled in Springdale, Wisconsin, in 1851.

Lyle settled on a 390-acre farm in sections 6, 17, 18 and 20 of the Town of Montrose in early 1864. On December 20 of the same year, he married Christina Stewart, whose family had come to the United States from Scotland in 1842 or 1843 and been among the pioneer settlers of Verona, Wisconsin. Both of them Presbyterians, and they had three children: Margaret, John T., and Catherine.

== Political career ==
Lyle had been a "Lincoln Republican" until 1864, when he became a Democrat. He served as Chairman (similar to Mayor) of Montrose in 1869, 1870, and 1874–1877. In 1872 he ran for the Assembly from the 4th Dane County Assembly district (the Towns of Blue Mounds, Fitchburg, Madison, Middleton, Montrose, Oregon, Perry, Primrose, Rutland, Springdale and Verona), losing to Republican Hiram Cornwell, who received 1,259 votes, against 1,039 for Lyle. In 1877, with the short-lived Reform Party (a coalition of Democrats, reform and Liberal Republicans, and Grangers formed in 1873, which had secured the election of one Governor of Wisconsin and a number of state legislators) in disarray, the incumbent in what was now the 1st Dane County district, Reformer Michael Johnson, did not seek re-election. Lyle was elected with 1,883 votes to 66 for one O. F. Olson, since there was no nominee of any party running against him. He was assigned to the standing committees on state affairs and on charitable and penal institutions. He did not run for re-election in 1878, and was succeeded by fellow Democrat Matthias Theisen.

== Later years ==
From April 29, 1892, to December 15, 1900, a post office was kept on Lyle's farm; while there was no settlement there, there was a Lyle School, and the Lyle name was sometimes used as part of a geographical description in plats. As late as 1896, a John Lyle is listed as a member of the Dane County Board from Montrose (town chairmen were ex officio members of the county board), but it is impossible to tell whether this is the Scottish-born Lyle or his son of the same name. Likewise, one "John Lyle" is listed as running the Lyle Cheese Factory, and being on the board of the Citizens' State Bank, in nearby Belleville, from 1900 to 1908. This was his son John T. Lyle (1868–1959) because Lyle died on April 21, 1907, in Montrose or in New Mexico. Lyle is buried in Verona, Wisconsin.
