= Silas Barber =

American politician

Silas Barber (June 30, 1824 – April 4, 1893) was a member of the Wisconsin State Assembly.

== Biography ==
Barber was born in Berkshire, Vermont on June 30, 1824. There have been different reports as to the year of his birth. On April 27, 1848, Barber married Amelia Hasbrouck. They had three children. In 1851, he settled in Waukesha, Wisconsin. Barber died on April 4, 1893.

== Career ==
Barber was a member of the Assembly during the 1868 and 1875 sessions. Other positions he held include Town Treasurer. He was a Democrat.
