= John H. Tierney =

American politician (1832–1907)

John Hogan Tierney (June 24, 1832 – February 9, 1907) was an American politician and farmer.

Tierney was born in Freshford, County Kilkenny, Ireland and went to the public schools in Ireland. He emigrated to the United States in 1851 and settled in the Town of Westport, Dane County, Wisconsin. He was a farmer. Tierney served as the chairman of the Westport Town Board and on the Dane County Board of Supervisors. He died in Waunakee, Wisconsin.

== Legislative service ==
In 1879 he was elected to the 1st Dane County district of the Wisconsin House of Representatives (the Towns of Berry, Black Earth, Blue Mounds, Cross Plains, Dane, Fitchburg, Mazomanie, Middleton, Montrose, Perry, Primrose, Roxbury, Springdale, Springfield, Verona, Vermont and Westport) as a Democrat, with 1748 votes to 537 for Independent Greenbacker John E. Brumm and 460 for Republican D. H. Eastman, for the 1880 term (incumbent Matthias Theisen, also a Democrat, was not a candidate). He was assigned to the standing committee on privileges and elections. He did not run for re-election, and was succeeded by fellow Democrat Samuel James Coldwell.
