= Waukesha (village), Wisconsin =

Waukesha, Wisconsin
- Village
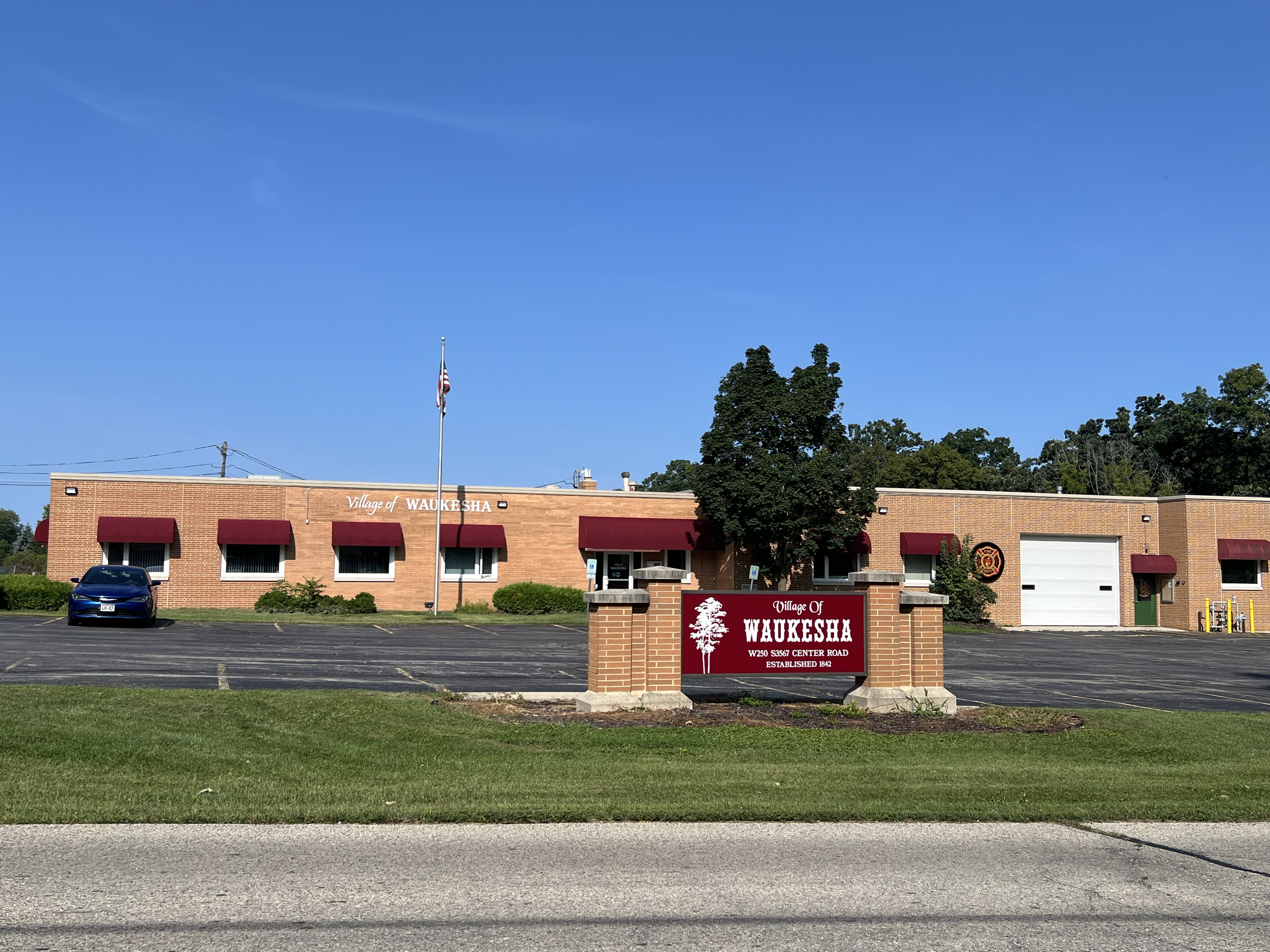
- Village hall

- Location in Waukesha County and the state of Wisconsin.
- Coordinates: 42°58′43″N 88°14′49″W
- Country: United States
- State: Wisconsin
- County: Waukesha

Area
  - Total: 23.0 sq mi (59.5 km^{2})
  - Land: 22.9 sq mi (59.3 km^{2})
  - Water: 0.12 sq mi (0.3 km^{2})
- Elevation: 873 ft (266 m)

Population (2020)
  - Total: 8,457
  - Density: 376/sq mi (145.1/km^{2})
- Time zone: UTC-6 (Central (CST))
  - Summer (DST): UTC-5 (CDT)
- FIPS code: 55-84275
- GNIS feature ID: 1584372
- Website: www.villageofwaukesha.gov

Waukesha is a village in Waukesha County, Wisconsin, United States. The population was 8,457 at the 2020 census. The City of Waukesha is located adjacent to the village.

== History ==
Originally part of the Town of Muskego, the Town of Prairie Village (soon renamed Prairieville) was named after the Native American settlement in that area. The town was renamed in 1847, soon after the new Waukesha County was created from the western portion of Milwaukee County. On January 10, 1852, the settled area once known as Prairieville was separated from the Town of Waukesha, and incorporated as the village (later the city) of Waukesha. The remainder of the town continued to bear the name as well (as is customary in Wisconsin).

On May 12, 2020, the former town of Waukesha incorporated as a village following a referendum where residents voted 9-to-1 in favor of incorporation. While the City of Waukesha sued, challenging the legality of the incorporation, the Village eventually won the fight after the Wisconsin Supreme Court let a lower court ruling stand that upheld the incorporation.

== Geography ==
According to the United States Census Bureau, the village has a total area of 23.0 square miles (59.5 km^{2}), of which 22.9 square miles (59.3 km^{2}) is land, and 0.1 square mile (0.3 km^{2}) (0.44%) is water.

== Demographics ==
Historical population
Census	Pop.	Note	%±
1980	6,668		—
1990	7,566		13.5%
2000	8,596		13.6%
2010	9,133		6.2%
2020	8,457		−7.4%

As of the census of 2000, there were 8,596 people, 2,891 households, and 2,494 families residing in the town. The population density was 375.8 people per square mile (145.1/km^{2}). There were 2,945 housing units at an average density of 128.7 per square mile (49.7/km^{2}). The racial makeup of the town was 97.17% White, 0.28% Black or African American, 0.12% Native American, 1.12% Asian, 0.06% Pacific Islander, 0.70% from other races, and 0.56% from two or more races. 2.00% of the population were Hispanic or Latino of any race.

There were 2,891 households, out of which 42.4% had children under the age of 18 living with them, 79.2% were married couples living together, 5.0% had a female householder with no husband present, and 13.7% were non-families. 11.8% of all households were made up of individuals, and 3.8% had someone living alone who was 65 years of age or older. The average household size was 2.97 and the average family size was 3.23.

In the town, the population was spread out, with 29.6% under the age of 18, 6.0% from 18 to 24, 28.1% from 25 to 44, 28.0% from 45 to 64, and 8.3% who were 65 years of age or older. The median age was 39 years. For every 100 females, there were 101.8 males. For every 100 females age 18 and over, there were 98.9 males.

The median income for a household in the town was $73,984, and the median income for a family was $77,762. Males had a median income of $54,202 versus $31,968 for females. The per capita income for the town was $27,861. About 0.5% of families and 0.7% of the population were below the poverty line, including 1.1% of those under age 18 and none of those age 65 or over.

== Notable people ==
- Silas Barber, Wisconsin State Representative.
- Paul Hamm and Morgan Hamm, Olympic gymnasts, born in Washburn, Wisconsin but grew up here.
- Joe Schobert, linebacker for the Cleveland Browns.
