= Nelson Williams (politician) =

American politician

Member of the Wisconsin Senate from the 11th district
- In office January 4, 1869 – January 2, 1871
- Preceded by: Clement Warner
- Succeeded by: William M. Colladay

Member of the Wisconsin State Assembly from the Dane 1st district
- In office January 6, 1868 – January 4, 1869
- Preceded by: Isaac Williams
- Succeeded by: John E. Johnson

Personal details
- Born: April 2, 1825 Clarenceville, Lower Canada, British North America
- Died: December 30, 1899 (aged 74) Minneapolis, Minnesota, U.S.
- Cause of death: Stomach cancer
- Resting place: Lakewood Cemetery, Minneapolis, Minnesota
- Party: Republican
- Spouses: Emily T. (died 1857); Delette Huldah Stoughton (died 1928)
- Children: Willis Stoughton Williams^{(b. 1862; died 1941)}; Mary (Peck)^{(b. 1864; died 1931)}; Alice (Osborne)^{(b. 1867; died 1920)}; Beatrice (Turner)^{(b. 1870; died 1963)}

Nelson Williams (April 2, 1825 – December 30, 1899) was a Canadian American immigrant and Republican politician. He served two years in the Wisconsin State Senate and one year in the State Assembly, representing Dane County.

== Biography ==
Williams was born in Clarenceville, Lower Canada, in what is now southern Quebec. He was raised and educated there, emigrating to the United States in 1855, and settling at Stoughton, Wisconsin, where he worked in grain trade. He became active in the new Republican Party and, in 1864, he was employed as sergeant-at-arms of the Wisconsin Senate, chosen by the members. He was then retained for the 1865 and 1866 sessions. In 1867, he was appointed to the University of Wisconsin Board of Regents.

Later that year, he was elected to the Wisconsin State Assembly on the Republican ticket, representing southeast Dane County. After his one-year term in the Assembly, he was elected to the Wisconsin State Senate for the 1869 and 1870 sessions.

After the close of the 1870 session, Williams relocated to Minneapolis, Minnesota, where he remained for the rest of his life. In Minneapolis, he co-owned a pharmacy and later became involved in the real estate business. He invested heavily in land around Lake Minnetonka, where he primarily resided, and served a term as Superintendent of the Poor in Minneapolis.

Williams suffered from stomach cancer and died at his home, 912 2nd Avenue, South, in Minneapolis on the morning of December 30, 1899. He was buried in Lakewood Cemetery.

== Personal life and family ==
Williams married his first wife, Emily, while living in Canada, but she died at Stoughton in 1857, at age 25. He then married Delette Huldah Stoughton, the daughter of Luke Stoughton, the founder and namesake of Stoughton. With his second wife, Williams had four children.

Two of Williams' grandchildren, Willis and Ethel Peck, died in the Iroquois Theatre fire in Chicago.

Wisconsin State Assembly
Preceded by Isaac Williams	Member of the Wisconsin State Assembly from the Dane 1st district January 6, 1868 – January 4, 1869	Succeeded by John E. Johnson
Wisconsin Senate
Preceded by Clement Warner	Member of the Wisconsin Senate from the 11th district January 4, 1869 – January 2, 1871	Succeeded by William M. Colladay
