= William Seamonson =

American politician

William Seamonson (February 9, 1840 – April 8, 1903) was a member of the Wisconsin State Assembly.

== Biography ==
Seamonson was born near Skien, Norway, on February 9, 1840 and immigrated to the United States as a child in 1842. The family initially lived in Muskegon, Michigan and then relocated to Pleasant Springs, Wisconsin in 1844. During the American Civil War, he served with the 23rd Wisconsin Volunteer Infantry Regiment of the Union Army, achieving the rank of sergeant. Conflicts he took part in include the Battle of Chickasaw Bayou, the Battle of Arkansas Post, the Battle of Grand Gulf, the Battle of Champion Hill, the Siege of Vicksburg, the Jackson Expedition, the Battle of Bayou Bourbeux, the Battle of Mansfield, the Battle of Pleasant Hill, the Battle of Spanish Fort and the Battle of Fort Blakeley. Afterwards, Seamonson owned farms in Pleasant Springs.

== Personal life and death ==
On November 1, 1865, Seamonson married Ragnild Christophersdotter. They had three children before her death in December 1873. In 1876, Seamonson married Isabelle Tostensdotter Gullikson. They had nine children. Seamonson and his family were Lutherans.

Seamonson relocated to Neillsville, Wisconsin shortly before his death, and he died there on April 8, 1903.

== Political career ==
Seamonson was a member of the Assembly during the 1876 session. Later, he was assistant sergeant-at-arms of the Assembly during the 1878 session. Other positions he held include chairman (similar to mayor) and town treasurer of Pleasant Springs, a member of the county board of Dane County, Wisconsin and delegate to the Republican State Convention in 1871, 1872, and 1875.
