= Mukwonago (town), Wisconsin =

Mukwonago
- Town
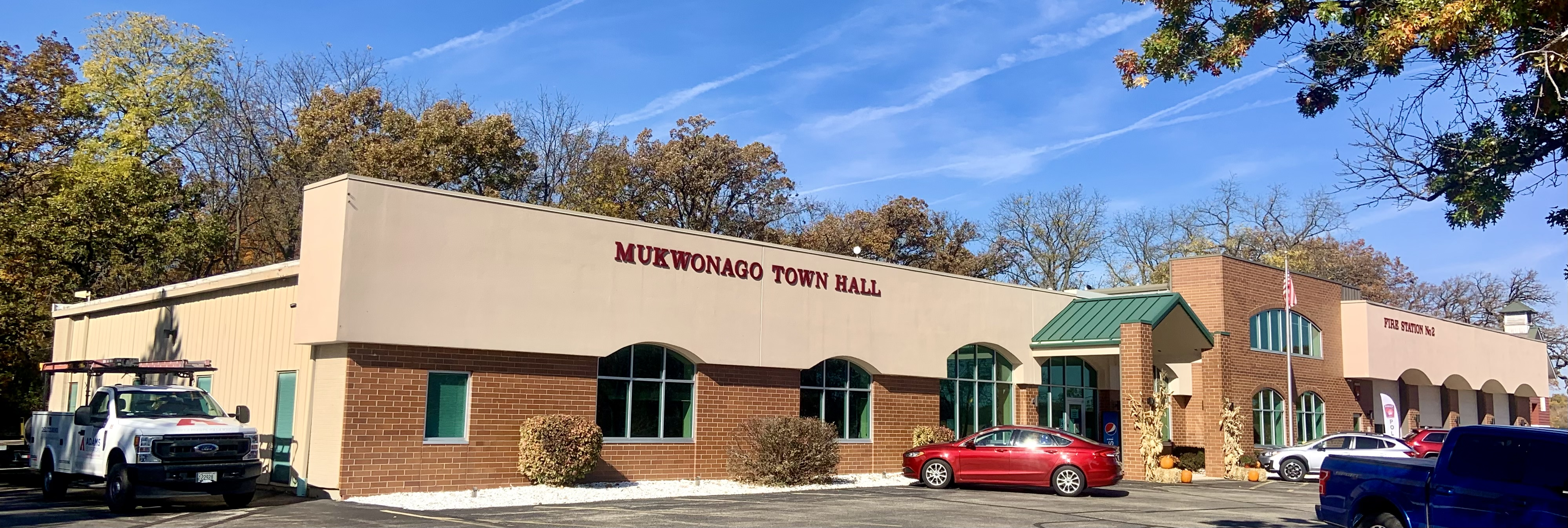
- Town hall

- Location in Waukesha County and the state of Wisconsin.
- Coordinates: 42°51′57″N 88°20′2″W
- Country: United States
- State: Wisconsin
- County: Waukesha

Area
  - Total: 32.0 sq mi (82.8 km^{2})
  - Land: 30.9 sq mi (80.1 km^{2})
  - Water: 1.0 sq mi (2.7 km^{2})

Population (2020)
  - Total: 7,781
  - Density: 252/sq mi (97.1/km^{2})
- Time zone: UTC-6 (Central (CST))
  - Summer (DST): UTC-5 (CDT)
- Area code: 262
- Website: Official website

Mukwonago is a town in Waukesha County, Wisconsin, United States. The population was 7,781 at the 2020 census. The Village of Mukwonago is located mostly within the town. The unincorporated community of Jericho is also located in the town.

== Geography ==
According to the United States Census Bureau, the town has a total area of 32.0 square miles (82.8 km^{2}), of which 30.9 square miles (80.1 km^{2}) is land and 1.0 square miles (2.7 km^{2}) (3.29%) is water.

== Demographics ==
Historical population
Census	Pop.	Note	%±
1980	4,979		—
1990	5,967		19.8%
2000	6,868		15.1%
2010	7,959		15.9%
2020	7,781		−2.2%

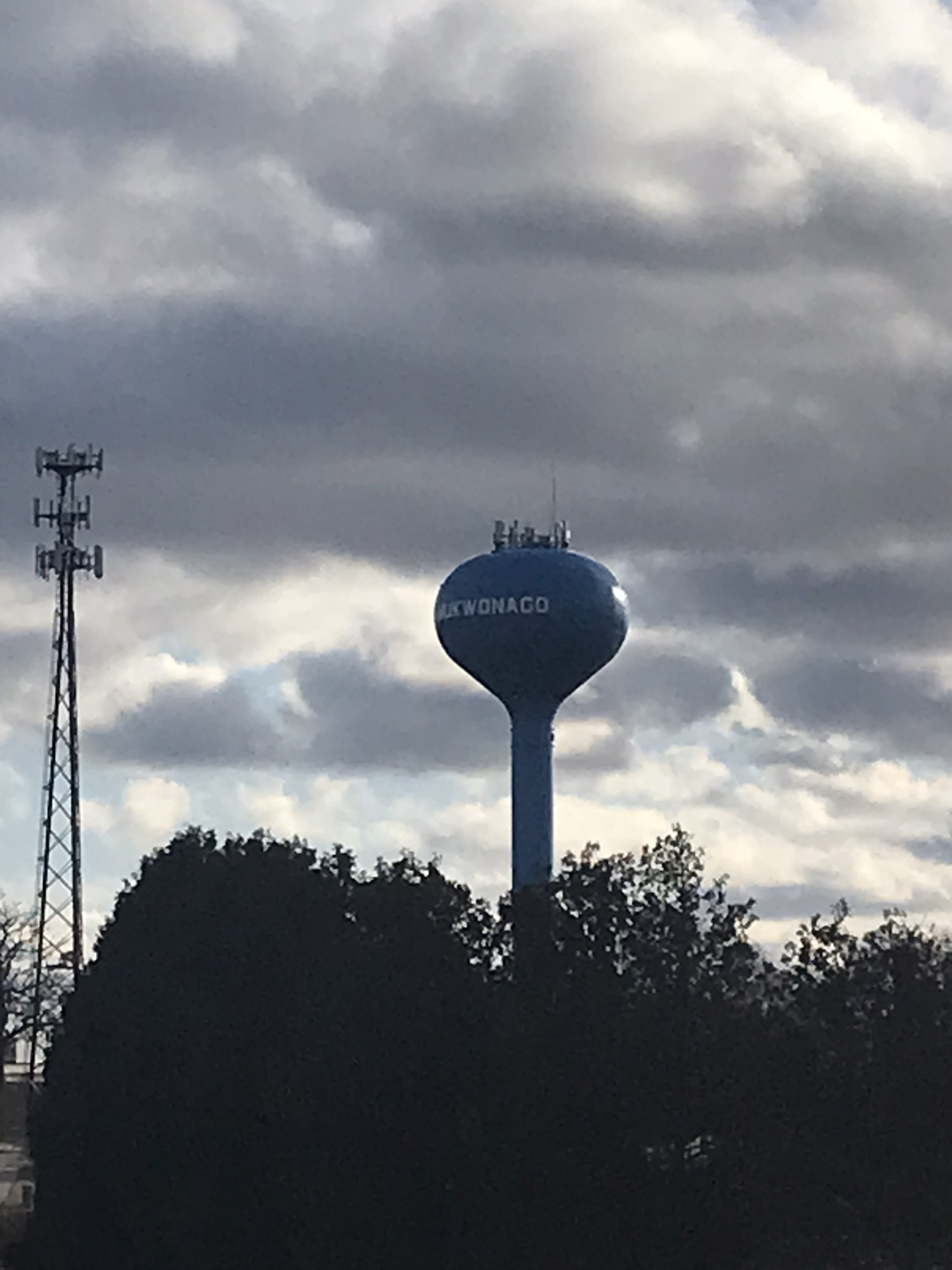
Mukwonago water tower

As of the census of 2000, there were 6,868 people, 2,184 households, and 1,965 families residing in the town. The population density was 222.2 people per square mile (85.8/km^{2}). There were 2,241 housing units at an average density of 72.5 per square mile (28.0/km^{2}). The racial makeup of the town was 97.90% White, 0.10% African American, 0.16% Native American, 0.32% Asian, 0.17% from other races, and 1.34% from two or more races. Hispanic or Latino of any race were 1.50% of the population.

There were 2,184 households, out of which 48.9% had children under the age of 18 living with them, 83.7% were married couples living together, 3.7% had a female householder with no husband present, and 10.0% were non-families. 7.8% of all households were made up of individuals, and 1.8% had someone living alone who was 65 years of age or older. The average household size was 3.14 and the average family size was 3.33.

In the town, the population was spread out, with 31.4% under the age of 18, 6.5% from 18 to 24, 31.0% from 25 to 44, 26.8% from 45 to 64, and 4.4% who were 65 years of age or older. The median age was 37 years. For every 100 females, there were 103.7 males. For every 100 females age 18 and over, there were 103.0 males.

The median income for a household in the town was $75,067, and the median income for a family was $75,944. Males had a median income of $50,610 versus $30,895 for females. The per capita income for the town was $26,071. About 1.3% of families and 1.4% of the population were below the poverty line, including 1.6% of those under age 18 and none of those age 65 or over.
