= Matthias Theisen =

American politician (1833–1923)

Matthias Theisen (sometimes spelled Mathias, August 24, 1833 – March 23, 1923) was an American farmer from Roxbury, Wisconsin, who served as a member of the Wisconsin State Assembly in 1879. Additionally, he chaired the town board (similar to city council) and was Town Treasurer of Roxbury, Wisconsin. He was a Democrat.

== Background ==
Theisen was born on August 24, 1833, in Trimport, in the Rhine Province of the Kingdom of Prussia. In August 1851, his parents Johann (John) Theisen (1805–1881) and Maria Anna (Mary A.) Theisen (1805–1883) emigrated to the United States, bringing Matthias and his brother Nicholas. The family settled on a farm in Section 16 of the Town of Roxbury. Matthias married Elizabeth Coch, also a native of Prussia. As of 1880, the Theisens and their families (including Matthias and Elizabeth's seven children) all still lived on the homestead, by that time 175 acres in extent.

== Public office ==
Theisen had been town treasurer and chairman of the town board for a series of years when he was elected in 1878 from Dane County's 1st Assembly district to succeeded fellow Democrat John Lyle, who was not running for re-election. He received 1,690 votes against 1,217 for Republican John McKenzie, and 442 for Greenbacker L. P. Edwin. He was assigned to the standing committee on agriculture. He did not seek re-election in 1879, and was succeeded by another Democrat, John H. Tierney.

== Later years ==
Theisen was interviewed as part of a 1920 Wisconsin Magazine of History article, and is described as "wonderfully vigorous in mind and body for one of his years"; he was by then 86 years old, and living in Sauk City.
