= Benjamin F. Adams =

American politician from Wisconsin (1822–1902)

Member of the Wisconsin State Assembly from the Dane 1st district
- In office January 1, 1872 – January 1, 1873
- Preceded by: Lemuel O. Humphrey
- Succeeded by: Oliver W. Thonrton
- In office January 1, 1862 – January 1, 1863
- Preceded by: Sereno W. Graves
- Succeeded by: Charles R. Head

Personal details
- Born: Benjamin Franklin Adams; December 4, 1822 Vernon, New York, U.S.
- Died: February 6, 1902 (aged 79) Madison, Wisconsin
- Resting place: Forest Hill Cemetery; Madison, Wisconsin
- Party: Republican
- Spouses: Caroline M. Shephard; (died 1898)
- Children: Henry Cullen Adams^{(b. 1850; died 1906)}
- Education: Hamilton College

Benjamin Franklin Adams (December 4, 1822 – February 6, 1902) was an American farmer and politician. He was a member of the Wisconsin State Assembly for two terms, representing southeastern Dane County.

== Biography ==
Born in Vernon, New York, Adams graduated from Hamilton College in 1845. He taught Greek at Hamilton Academy. Adams moved to the Wisconsin Territory in 1846 and lived in Fort Atkinson, in Jefferson County. Adams was a candidate for Assembly in 1852, but was defeated by former Lieutenant Governor John Edwin Holmes. Adams then settled in the town of Pleasant Springs, in Dane County. He served in the Wisconsin State Assembly as a Republican in 1862 and 1872. He died of pneumonia in Madison, Wisconsin, leaving an estate worth $20,000 to his son, Henry Cullen Adams.

His son, Henry Cullen Adams, also served in the Wisconsin Assembly and was elected to the United States House of Representatives for two terms before dying in office in 1906.
