= John Johnson (Wisconsin politician) =

American politician (1833–1892)

John Johnson (August 7, 1833 – February 15, 1892) was an American politician. An Independent Republican, he served in the Wisconsin State Assembly. He also served as chairman of the York Town Board.

Johnson was born on August 7, 1833, in Ancram, New York. Educated at public schools, he worked as a farmer. He moved to Wisconsin in 1847 and settled at York, except for a short time spent in Dodge County. He held various town offices, and served as chairman of the town board for five years. In the 1873 general election he received 995 votes, as an Independent Republican candidate, to 936 for Samuel C. Head, the Republican nominee), to represent the 1st Dane County Assembly district (Towns of Albion, Bristol, Cottage Grove, Christiana, Deerfield, Dunkirk, Medina, Pleasant Springs, Sun Prairie and York).
