= Verona (town), Wisconsin =

Town of Verona
- Town
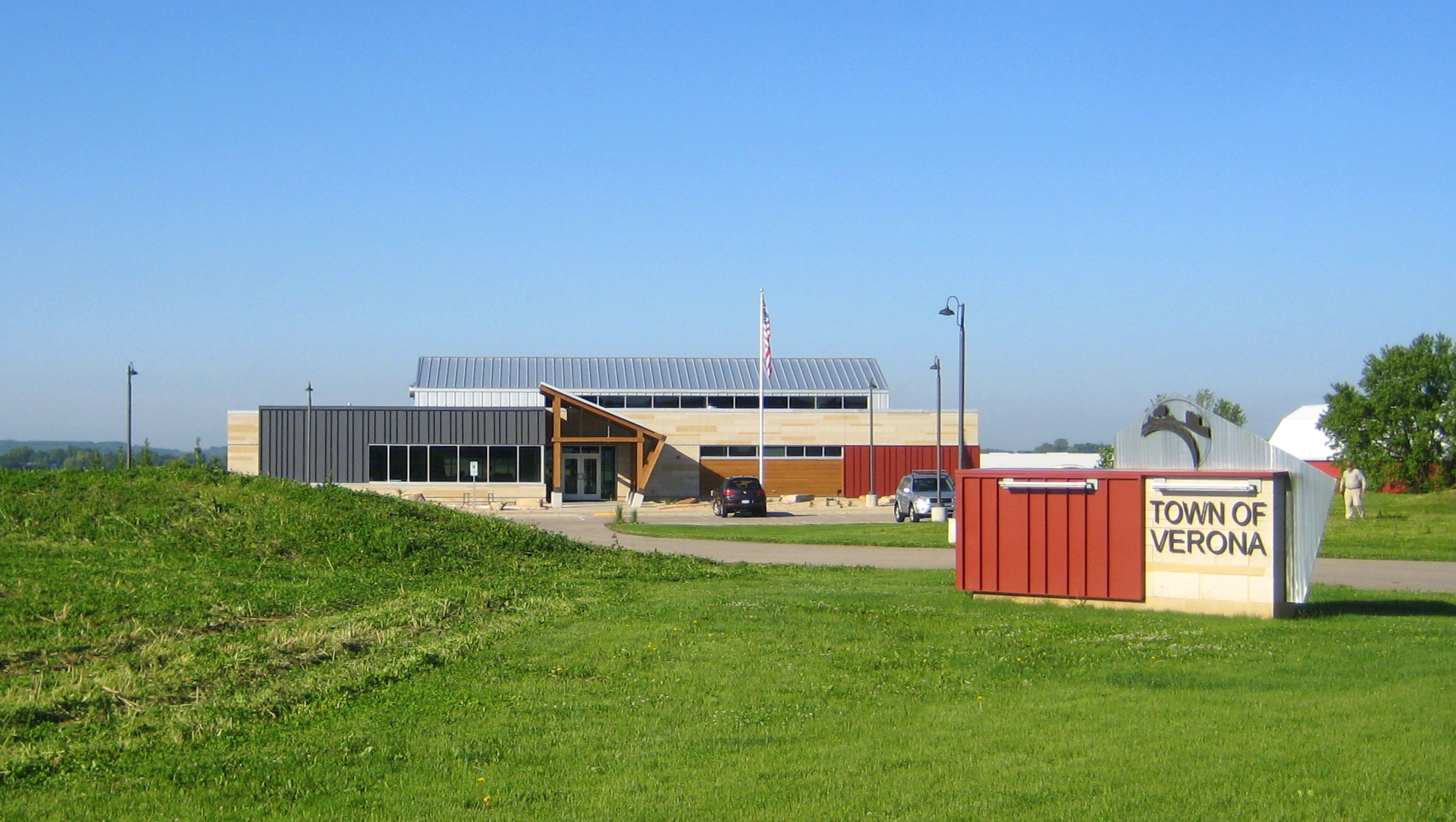
- Verona town hall

- Location in Dane County and the state of Wisconsin.
- Coordinates: 42°59′18″N 89°32′42″W
- Country: United States
- State: Wisconsin
- County: Dane

Area
  - Total: 29.3 sq mi (76.0 km^{2})
  - Land: 29.3 sq mi (75.9 km^{2})
  - Water: 0.039 sq mi (0.1 km^{2})
- Elevation: 974 ft (297 m)

Population (2020)
  - Total: 1,947
  - Density: 74/sq mi (28.4/km^{2})
- Time zone: UTC-6 (Central (CST))
  - Summer (DST): UTC-5 (CDT)
- Area code: 608
- FIPS code: 55-82625
- GNIS feature ID: 1584329

The Town of Verona is located in Dane County, Wisconsin, United States. The population was 1,947 at the 2020 census. The city of Verona and the unincorporated community of Five Points are located in the town.

== Geography ==
According to the United States Census Bureau, the town has a total area of 29.4 square miles (76 km^{2}), of which 29.3 square miles (76 km^{2}) is land and 0.04 square miles (0.10 km^{2}) (0.14%) is water.

== Demographics ==
As of the census of 2000, there were 2,153 people, 758 households, and 601 families residing in the town. The population density was 73.4 people per square mile (28.3 people/km^{2}). There were 774 housing units at an average density of 26.4 units per square mile (10.2 units/km^{2}). The racial makeup of the town was 96.75% White, 0.60% Black or African American, 0.19% Native American, 1.21% Asian, 0.23% from other races, and 1.02% from two or more races. 0.98% of the population were Hispanic or Latino of any race.

There were 758 households, out of which 35.5% had children under the age of 18 living with them, 70.7% were married couples living together, 5.1% had a female householder with no husband present, and 20.7% were non-families. 15.7% of all households were made up of individuals, and 4.0% had someone living alone who was 65 years of age or older. The average household size was 2.69 and the average family size was 3.00.

The population was 25.8% under the age of 18, 4.5% from 18 to 24, 24.8% from 25 to 44, 31.5% from 45 to 64, and 13.4% who were 65 years of age or older. The median age was 43 years. For every 100 females, there were 104.7 males. For every 100 females age 18 and over, there were 101.5 males.

The median income for a household in the town was $69,519, and the median income for a family was $80,000. Males had a median income of $46,688 versus $36,042 for females. The per capita income for the town was $31,405. About 1.5% of families and 2.2% of the population were below the poverty line, including none of those under the age of eighteen or sixty-five or over.

== Notable people ==
- Hiram Cornwell, Wisconsin State Representative, lived in the town
- Rudy W. Roethlisberger, Wisconsin State Representative, lived in the town
