= Frank Smith (Wisconsin politician) =

American politician (1849–1921)

Member of the Wisconsin State Assembly from the Dane 1st district
- In office January 4, 1909 – January 2, 1911
- Preceded by: Elmore Elver
- Succeeded by: Cornelius A. Harper

Personal details
- Born: c. 1849 Ripley, Tennessee, U.S.
- Died: February 13, 1921 (aged 71–72) Madison, Wisconsin, U.S.
- Resting place: Greenwood Cemetery, Brodhead, Wisconsin
- Party: Republican
- Spouse: married
- Education: Chicago College of Dental Surgery
- Profession: Dentist

Military service
- Allegiance: United States
- Branch/service: United States Army
- Years of service: late 1860s

Frank Smith (c. 1849 – February 13, 1921) was an American dentist and Republican politician from Madison, Wisconsin. He was a member of the Wisconsin State Assembly, representing central Dane County during the 1909 session.

== Biography ==
Frank Smith was born in Ripley, Tennessee, in 1849. At age 17, just after the conclusion of the American Civil War, he enlisted in the United States Army and served a three-year term of enlistment. After his honorable discharge, he purchased a farm in Green County, Wisconsin. He remained on the farm for only a few years, then spent four years working as a traveling salesman. Beginning in the late 1870s, he worked for nine years as an engineer for the Wisconsin State Capitol in Madison, Wisconsin.

He then moved to Chicago, where he entered the Chicago College of Dental Surgery, graduating in 1894. He practiced for several years as a dentist in Chicago before returning to Madison in 1901.

In 1902, he was elected to the Madison City Council, running on the Republican ticket. He was re-elected in 1904.

In 1908, he ran for Wisconsin State Assembly under the new Primary election system. He prevailed in the primary over two opponents, including the last Republican representative of the district—Ernest Warner. He went on to win the general election with 43% of the vote, defeating the incumbent Democrat Elmore Elver. He served during the 49th Wisconsin Legislature and ran for re-election in 1910, but was defeated in the Republican primary by Madison physician Cornelius A. Harper.

Smith died at his home in downtown Madison, Wisconsin, on February 3, 1921, after suffering a year of illness.

== Electoral history ==
=== Wisconsin Assembly (1908, 1910) ===
Wisconsin Assembly, Dane 1st District Election, 1908
Party	Candidate	Votes	%	±%
Republican Primary, September 8, 1908
Republican	Frank Smith	1,432	48.61%	
Republican	Ernest Warner	1,130	38.36%	
Republican	H. C. Duke	382	12.97%	
Republican	William J. McKay	2	0.07%	
Plurality		302	10.25%	
Total votes		2,946	100.0%	
General Election, November 3, 1908
Republican	Frank Smith	3,217	43.00%	+8.83%
Democratic	Elmore Elver (incumbent)	2,923	39.07%	+1.69%
Independent	William J. McKay	1,307	17.47%	−10.99%
Social Democratic	William T. Boorman	35	0.47%	
Plurality		294	3.93%	+0.72%
Total votes		7,482	100.0%	+35.62%
Republican gain from Democratic		Swing	7.14%	

Wisconsin Assembly, Dane 1st District Election, 1910
Party	Candidate	Votes	%	±%
Republican Primary, September 6, 1910
Republican	Cornelius A. Harper	2,327	62.67%	
Republican	Frank Smith (incumbent)	1,386	37.33%	−11.28%
Plurality		941	25.34%	+15.09%
Total votes		3,713	100.0%	+26.04%

Wisconsin Senate
Preceded by Elmore Elver	Member of the Wisconsin Senate from the Dane 1st district January 4, 1909 – January 2, 1911	Succeeded by Cornelius A. Harper
