= John Anders Johnson =

19th century American politician

John A. Johnson

Member of the Wisconsin Senate from the 7th district
- In office January 6, 1873 – January 4, 1875
- Preceded by: William M. Colladay
- Succeeded by: George E. Bryant

Member of the Wisconsin State Assembly from the Dane 1st district
- In office January 5, 1857 – January 4, 1858
- Preceded by: Charles R. Head
- Succeeded by: Daniel B. Crandall

Personal details
- Born: April 15, 1832 Telemark, Sweden–Norway
- Died: November 10, 1901 (aged 69) Madison, Wisconsin, U.S.
- Resting place: Forest Hill Cemetery, Madison, Wisconsin
- Party: Republican
- Spouses: Caroline K. Thompson (m. 1856; died 1860); Kaia N. M. Kildahl (m. 1861–1901)
- Children: Caroline Johnson^{(b. 1860; died 1860)}; Frederick A. Johnson^{(b. 1862; died 1908)}; Ella Josephine Johnson^{(b. 1864; died 1866)}; Ida Astella (Fisk)^{(b. 1867; died 1949)}; Carl A. Johnson^{(b. 1870; died 1931)}; Hobart Stanley Johnson^{(b. 1873; died 1942)}; Maurice Ingolf Johnson^{(b. 1876; died 1935)}
- Relatives: Ole C. Johnson (brother)

John Anders Johnson (April 15, 1832 – November 10, 1901) was a Norwegian American immigrant, businessman, and Republican politician. He served in the Wisconsin State Senate and Assembly, representing eastern Dane County.

== Biography ==
Johnson was born in Telemark, Norway, on April 15, 1832, as the eldest of the five children of Anders Johnson (1804–1880) and his wife, Aaste Killing Koven (1808–1893). His family immigrated to the United States in 1844, traveling via New York to reach Milwaukee. In 1852, the family to Pleasant Springs, Wisconsin. He married Karen Kristie Thompson in 1856. They had a daughter before her death in 1860. On October 31, 1861, Johnson married Kaia Nicoline Marie Kildahl. They had six children. He died of a stomach ulcer on November 10, 1901, and was buried at Forest Hill Cemetery.

== Career ==
Johnson was a member of the Assembly in 1857. He served as Clerk of Dane County, Wisconsin, from 1861 to 1869. From 1873 to 1874, he was a member of the Senate. Other positions Johnson held include Town Clerk and Town Chairman of Pleasant Springs and justice of the peace.

Outside politics Johnson owned Fuller & Johnson, a company that produced farm machinery, having previously been a farmer.

== Electoral history ==
Wisconsin Senate, 7th District Election, 1872
Party	Candidate	Votes	%	±%
General Election, November 5, 1872
Republican	John A. Johnson	2,903	53.76%	
Liberal Republican	A. R. Cornwall	2,497	46.24%	
Plurality		406	7.52%	-3.45%
Total votes		5,400	100.0%	+78.45%
Republican hold				

Wisconsin State Assembly
Preceded by Charles R. Head	Member of the Wisconsin State Assembly from the Dane 1st district January 5, 1857 – January 4, 1858	Succeeded by Daniel B. Crandall
Wisconsin Senate
Preceded by William M. Colladay	Member of the Wisconsin Senate from the 7th district January 6, 1873 – January 4, 1875	Succeeded by George E. Bryant
