= Hiram Cornwell =

American politician

Hiram Henry Cornwell (sometimes known as Cornwall; November 23, 1828 – July 9, 1916) was a member of the Wisconsin State Assembly.

Cornwell was born on November 23, 1828. Sources have differed on the exact location. Cornwell later resided in Verona, Wisconsin. He died on July 9, 1916, in Edgeley, North Dakota.

== Assembly career ==
Cornwell was a member of the Assembly during the 1873 session. He was a Republican.
