= York, Dane County, Wisconsin =

Town of York
- Town
- Location in Dane County and the state of Wisconsin
- Coordinates: 43°14′28″N 89°4′24″W
- Country: United States
- State: Wisconsin
- County: Dane

Area
  - Total: 36 sq mi (93 km^{2})
  - Land: 35.9 sq mi (92.9 km^{2})
  - Water: 0.039 sq mi (0.1 km^{2})
- Elevation: 912 ft (278 m)

Population (2020)
  - Total: 697
  - Density: 20/sq mi (7.6/km^{2})
- Time zone: UTC-6 (Central (CST))
  - Summer (DST): UTC-5 (CDT)
- Area code(s): 608/353, 920/274
- FIPS code: 55-89450
- GNIS feature ID: 1584493
- Website: https://townofyorkwi.com/

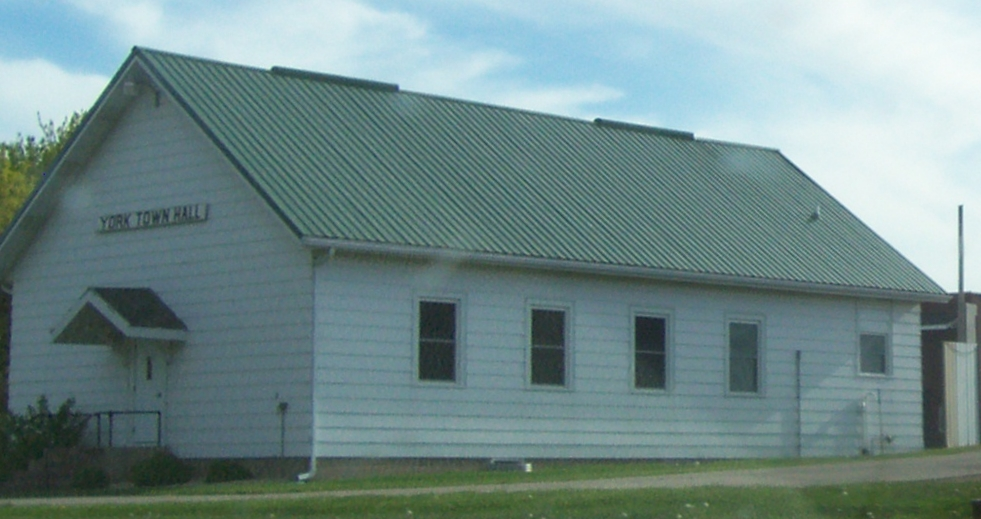
Town hall

The Town of York is located in Dane County, Wisconsin, United States. The population was 697 at the 2020 census. The unincorporated community of York Center is located in the town.

== Geography ==
According to the United States Census Bureau, the town has a total area of 35.9 square miles (93.0 km^{2}), of which 35.9 square miles (92.9 km^{2}) is land and 0.04 square miles (0.1 km^{2}) (0.06%) is water.

== Demographics ==
At the 2000 census, there were 703 people, 252 households and 195 families living in the town. The population density was 19.6 per square mile (7.6/km^{2}). There were 262 housing units at an average density of 7.3 per square mile (2.8/km^{2}). The racial makeup was 98.29% White, 0.28% African American, 0.28% Asian, 0.57% from other races, and 0.57% from two or more races. Hispanic or Latino people of any race were 0.71% of the population.

There were 252 households, of which 31.7% had children under the age of 18 living with them, 70.2% were married couples living together, 3.2% had a female householder with no husband present, and 22.6% were non-families. 17.1% of all households were made up of individuals, and 6.3% had someone living alone who was 65 years of age or older. The average household size was 2.79 and the average family size was 3.10.

The population was 26.3% under the age of 18, 5% from 18 to 24, 29% from 25 to 44, 25% from 45 to 64, and 14.7% who were 65 years of age or older. The median age was 39 years. For every 100 females, there were 106.2 males. For every 100 females age 18 and over, there were 108.9 males.

The median household income was $52,019 and the median family income was $54,375. Males had a median income of $36,484 and females $23,646. The per capita income was $21,805. About 3.2% of families and 7.7% of the population were below the poverty line, including 14.7% of those under age 18 and none of those age 65 or over.
