= Dunn, Dane County, Wisconsin =

Town of Dunn, Wisconsin
- Town
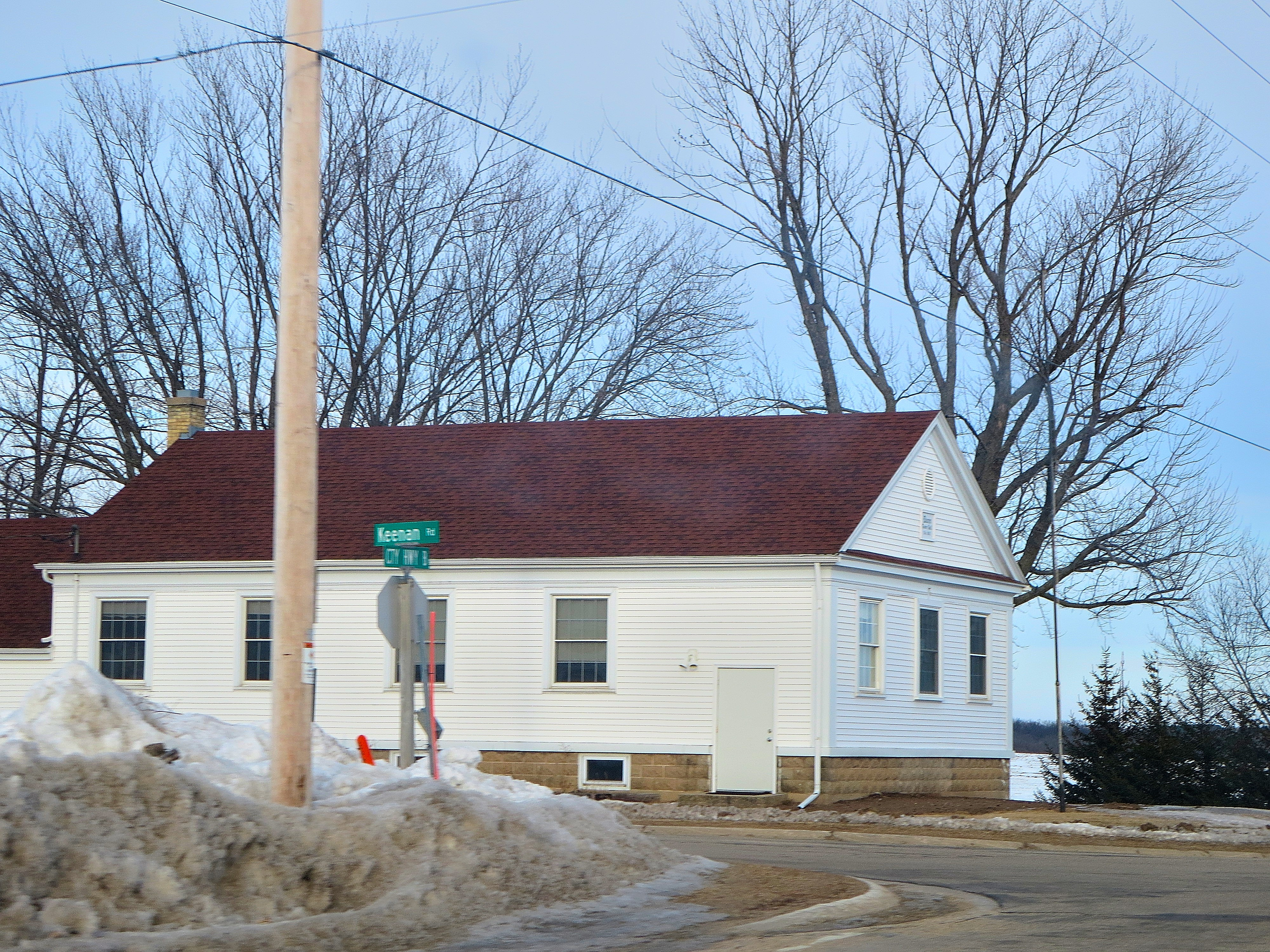
- Town hall

- Location in Dane County and the state of Wisconsin.
- Coordinates: 42°58′47″N 89°18′24″W
- Country: United States
- State: Wisconsin
- County: Dane

Area
  - Total: 34.4 sq mi (89.2 km^{2})
  - Land: 28.6 sq mi (74.2 km^{2})
  - Water: 5.8 sq mi (15.0 km^{2})
- Elevation: 890 ft (270 m)

Population (2020)
  - Total: 4,880
  - Density: 180/sq mi (71/km^{2})
- Time zone: UTC-6 (Central (CST))
  - Summer (DST): UTC-5 (CDT)
- Area code: 608
- FIPS code: 55-21125
- GNIS feature ID: 1583105

Dunn is a town in Dane County, Wisconsin, United States. The population was 4,880 at the 2020 census.

== Geography ==
According to the United States Census Bureau, the town has a total area of 34.4 square miles (89.1 km^{2}), of which 28.6 square miles (74.2 km^{2}) is land and 5.8 square miles (15.0 km^{2}) (16.79%) is water.

== Demographics ==
At the 2000 census there were 5,270 people, 2,079 households, and 1,563 families living in the town. The population density was 184.0 people per square mile (71.0/km^{2}). There were 2,259 housing units at an average density of 78.9 per square mile (30.4/km^{2}). The racial makeup of the town was 97.80% White, 0.21% African American, 0.25% Native American, 0.49% Asian, 0.66% from other races, and 0.59% from two or more races. Hispanic or Latino of any race were 1.75%.

Of the 2,079 households 31.4% had children under the age of 18 living with them, 65.6% were married couples living together, 5.6% had a female householder with no husband present, and 24.8% were non-families. 17.6% of households were one person and 4.5% were one person aged 65 or older. The average household size was 2.53 and the average family size was 2.87.

The age distribution was 23.2% under the age of 18, 5.2% from 18 to 24, 29.8% from 25 to 44, 32.8% from 45 to 64, and 9.0% 65 or older. The median age was 41 years. For every 100 females, there were 105.5 males. For every 100 females age 18 and over, there were 103.3 males.

The median household income was $66,250 and the median family income was $71,228. Males had a median income of $41,497 versus $32,071 for females. The per capita income for the town was $30,881. None of the families and 1.7% of the population were living below the poverty line, including no under eighteens and none of those over 64.
