= Pleasant Springs, Wisconsin =

Town of Pleasant Springs
- Town
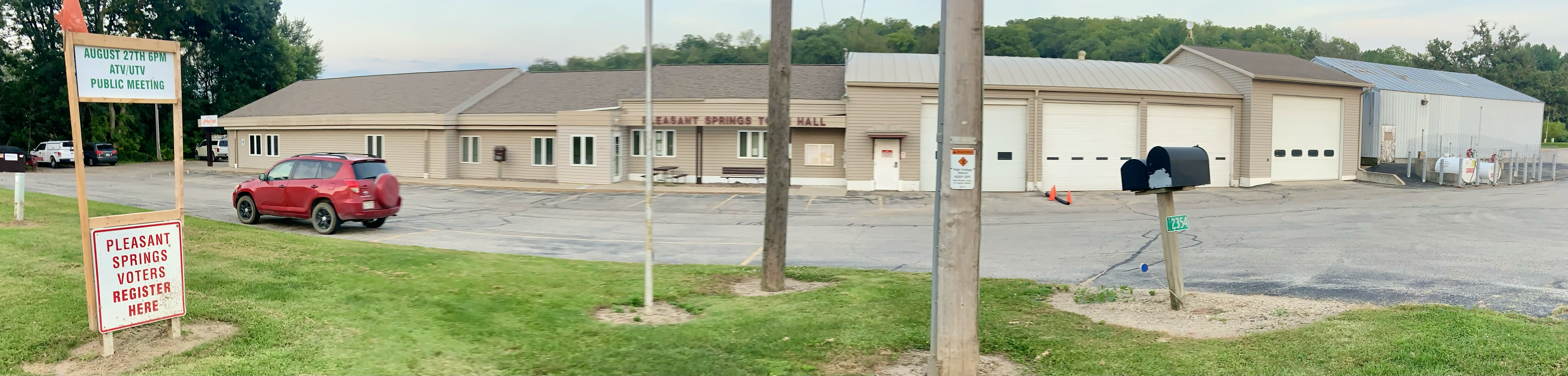
- Town hall

- Location in Dane County and the state of Wisconsin.
- Coordinates: 42°58′39″N 89°12′35″W
- Country: United States
- State: Wisconsin
- County: Dane

Area
  - Total: 35.6 sq mi (92.2 km^{2})
  - Land: 33.4 sq mi (86.4 km^{2})
  - Water: 2.2 sq mi (5.8 km^{2})
- Elevation: 860 ft (262 m)

Population (2020)
  - Total: 3,078
  - Density: 92.3/sq mi (35.6/km^{2})
- Time zone: UTC-6 (Central (CST))
  - Summer (DST): UTC-5 (CDT)
- Area code: 608
- FIPS code: 55-63375
- GNIS feature ID: 1583937
- Website: http://www.pleasantsprings.org

The Town of Pleasant Springs is located in Dane County, Wisconsin, United States. The population was 3,078 at the 2020 census. The unincorporated community of Kegonsa is located in the town. The unincorporated community of Hoffman Corners is also located partially in the town.

== Geography ==
According to the United States Census Bureau, the town has a total area of 35.6 square miles (92.2 km^{2}), of which, 33.4 square miles (86.4 km^{2}) of it is land and 2.2 square miles (5.8 km^{2}) of it (6.27%) is water.

== Demographics ==
At the 2000 census there were 3,053 people, 1,099 households, and 896 families in the town. The population density was 91.5 people per square mile (35.3/km^{2}). There were 1,221 housing units at an average density of 36.6 per square mile (14.1/km^{2}). The racial makeup of the town was 97.94% White, 0.59% African American, 0.66% Asian, 0.13% from other races, and 0.69% from two or more races. Hispanic or Latino of any race were 0.59%.

Of the 1,099 households 37.7% had children under the age of 18 living with them, 74.4% were married couples living together, 4.3% had a female householder with no husband present, and 18.4% were non-families. 12.6% of households were one person and 5.1% were one person aged 65 or older. The average household size was 2.77 and the average family size was 3.05.

The age distribution was 26.0% under the age of 18, 5.7% from 18 to 24, 28.8% from 25 to 44, 29.8% from 45 to 64, and 9.8% 65 or older. The median age was 40 years. For every 100 females, there were 103.0 males. For every 100 females age 18 and over, there were 104.5 males.

The median household income was $68,958 and the median family income was $73,857. Males had a median income of $41,822 versus $30,568 for females. The per capita income for the town was $28,938. About 2.2% of families and 4.1% of the population were below the poverty line, including 7.2% of those under age 18 and 8.5% of those age 65 or over.

== Notable people ==
- Benjamin F. Adams, Wisconsin politician
- Daniel Bechtel, Wisconsin politician
- Henry Huber, Wisconsin politician
- John Anders Johnson, Wisconsin politician
- Ole K. Roe, Wisconsin politician
- William Seamonson, Wisconsin politician
