= 1917 Wisconsin Supreme Court election =

- April 3, 1917

Candidate	Walter C. Owen	Roujet D. Marshall
Popular vote	148,324	138,620
Percentage	51.66%	48.28%
- Owens: 50–60% 60–70% 70–80% Marshall: 50–60% 60–70%
Justice before election
Roujet D. Marshall
Elected Justice
Walter C. Owen

The 1917 Wisconsin Supreme Court election was held on Tuesday, April 3, 1907, to elect a justice to the Wisconsin Supreme Court for a ten-year term. Walter C. Owen (the attorney general of Wisconsin) defeated incumbent justice Roujet D. Marshall. This was only the third instance in the state's history in which an incumbent Supreme Court justice lost an election. Marshall's defeat was largely attributed to a controversial ruling he authored striking down the state's forestry law.

== Background ==
Marshall had held his seat since 1895, when Governor William Upham appointed him to fill a vacancy on the court. He was thereafter elected to the seat three times, first in the special election of 1896, being re-elected in the regular elections held in 1897 and 1907. He faced no opposition in those elections.

== Result ==
Owen defeated Marshall. This was only the third instance in which an incumbent justice lost an election to the state's supreme court (the previous instances being in 1855 and 1908). This has only occurred five further times since (in 1947, 1958, 1967, 2008, and 2020).

Marshall's defeat has been largely attributed to a then-controversial 1915 majority opinion that he had authored regarding the state's Forestry Law (a law championed by the state's progressive). Marshall had found that the violated state's constitution. The law had established a state forest preserve and created a state commission tasked with conservation of lands that had been cleared by lumbering. Contrarily, as attorney general Owen had defended the law before the court.

1917 Wisconsin Supreme Court election
Party	Candidate	Votes	%
General election (April 3, 1917)
Nonpartisan	Walter C. Owen	148,324	51.66
Nonpartisan	Roujet D. Marshall (incumbent)	138,620	48.28
write-ins	scattering	157	0.05
Plurality		9,704	3.38
Total votes		287,101	100
