= Charles E. Estabrook =

American politician (1847–1918)

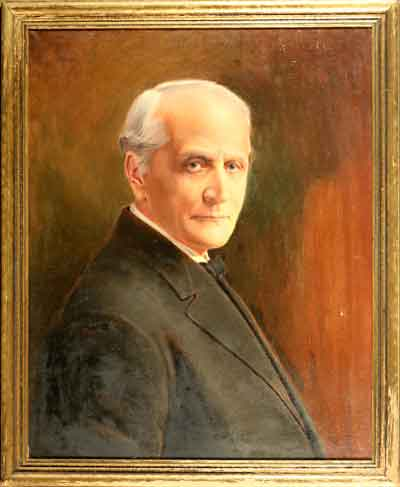

14th Attorney General of Wisconsin
- In office January 3, 1887 – January 5, 1891
- Governor: Jeremiah M. Rusk; William D. Hoard
- Preceded by: Leander F. Frisby
- Succeeded by: James L. O'Connor

Member of the Wisconsin State Assembly from the Milwaukee 13th district
- In office January 6, 1913 – January 4, 1915
- Preceded by: George Klenzendorff
- Succeeded by: Christoph Paulus
- In office January 7, 1907 – January 2, 1911
- Preceded by: Henry Holle
- Succeeded by: George Klenzendorff

Member of the Wisconsin State Assembly from the Manitowoc 3rd district
- In office January 5, 1885 – January 3, 1887
- Preceded by: Wilhelm Albers
- Succeeded by: Reinhardt Rahr
- In office January 3, 1881 – January 1, 1883
- Preceded by: William H. Hemschemeyer
- Succeeded by: Wilhelm Albers

Personal details
- Born: Charles Edward Estabrook; October 31, 1847 Grant County, Wisconsin Territory, U.S.
- Died: December 3, 1918 (aged 71) Milwaukee, Wisconsin, U.S.
- Resting place: Forest Hill Cemetery, Madison, Wisconsin
- Party: Republican
- Spouse: Jennie Hodges (m. 1876–1918)
- Children: Charles Mitchell Estabrook; Margaret Estabrook; Francis H. Estabrook; Mary Estabrook; George M. Estabrook; Benjamin H. Estabrook
- Parent: Edward Estabrook (father)
- Education: Platteville Academy; Platteville Normal School
- Occupation: teacher, lawyer, politician

Military service
- Allegiance: United States
- Branch/service: United States Volunteers; Union Army
- Years of service: 1864–1865
- Rank: Corporal, USV
- Unit: 43rd Reg. Wis. Vol. Infantry
- Battles/wars: American Civil War: Franklin–Nashville Campaign; Battle of Johnsonville; Battle of Nashville

Charles Edward Estabrook (October 31, 1847 – December 3, 1918) was an American educator, lawyer, and Republican politician from the U.S. state of Wisconsin. He was the 14th Attorney General of Wisconsin and served 14 years in the Wisconsin State Assembly, representing first Manitowoc and later Milwaukee. As a young man, he was an enlisted volunteer in the Union Army during the American Civil War. Later, he founded the Wisconsin Historical Commission and published several volumes of history of the Civil War for the Wisconsin Historical Society.

== Early life ==
Estabrook was born near Platteville in Grant County, Wisconsin Territory, on October 31, 1847. His father was an early settler of Grant County after it was acquired from the Meskwaki. Charles worked on his father's farm throughout his childhood, attending the rural public school during the winter months.

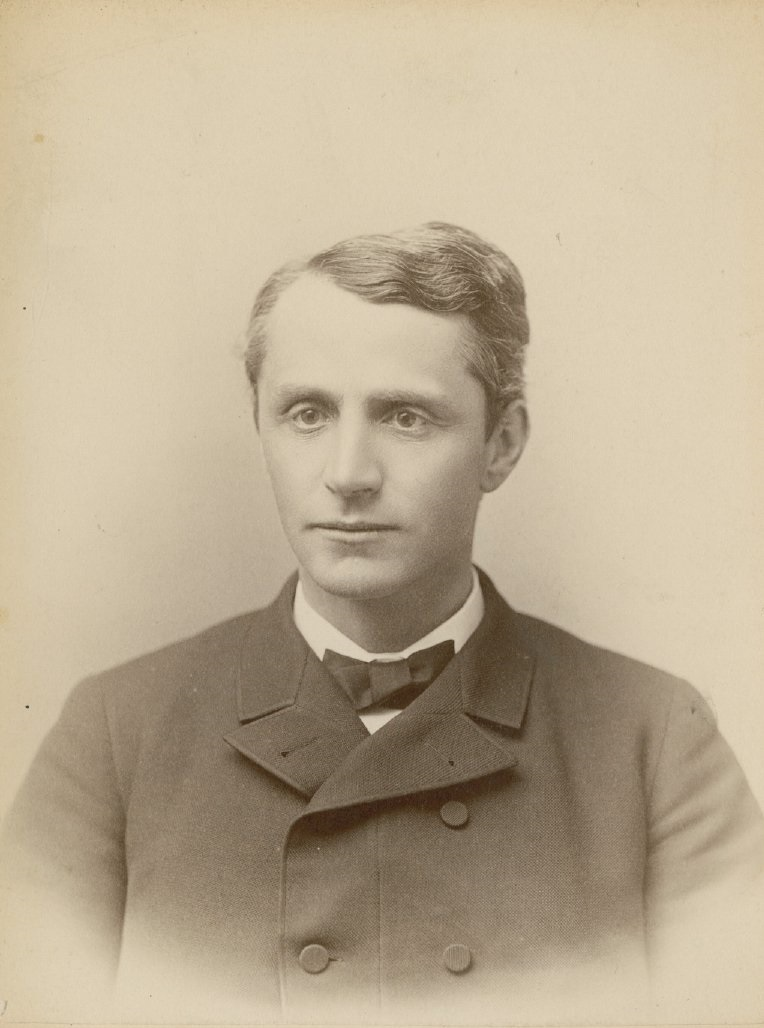
Charles E. Estabrook, c. 1864

== Civil War service ==
At the outbreak of the American Civil War, Charles was just 13 years old, but was enthusiastic about the Union cause and wanted to join the fight. He ultimately was allowed to enlist in the third year of the war, in August 1864, and was assigned to Company B in the newly raised 43rd Wisconsin Infantry Regiment. The regiment was assigned to Tennessee to defend railroad and supply lines, and saw some combat during the Franklin–Nashville Campaign near the end of the war. Estabrook mustered out of the service in July 1865 as a corporal.

== Early career ==
After returning from the Army he attended Platteville Academy and the Platteville Normal School, graduating in 1870. He went to work as a teacher at Platteville and Belmont. In 1871, he moved to Manitowoc, where he continued teaching and was placed in charge of the First Ward public school. While working as a teacher, he had also been studying the law, first under William Carter at Platteville, and then with J. D. Markham at Manitowoc. In January 1874, he was admitted to the State Bar of Wisconsin.

Just a few months after being admitted to the bar, in April 1874, he was elected city attorney of Manitowoc, holding that office until he won election to the Wisconsin State Assembly in 1880.

== Political career ==
In November 1880, he was elected to represent Manitowoc County's 3rd assembly district, then comprising the city of Manitowoc and the towns of Centerville, Manitowoc, Manitowoc Rapids and Newton. He was reelected in 1881, but was not a candidate for reelection in 1882. In these first two years in the Assembly, he was assigned to the standing committees on the judiciary and on education, and was, in 1882, chairman of the Committee on Education.

Estabrook was a delegate to the 1884 Republican National Convention in Chicago, and in the same year was narrowly re-elected to his old seat, with 1,219 votes to 1,215 for Democrat George Franz. He returned to the judiciary committee, and became chairman of the committee on assessment and collection of taxes.

He was elected Attorney General of Wisconsin in 1886, with 131,358 votes to 115,949 for Democrat George W. Bird, 21,740 for Populist John E. Thomas, and 17,247 for Prohibitionist E. W. Chafin (his old Assembly seat fell to Democrat Reinhardt Rahr); and re-elected in 1888, with 176,351 votes to 154,943 for Democrat Timothy E. Ryan, 14,582 for Prohibitionist Charles E. Pike, and 8,709 votes for Union Labor Party candidate Kerellio Shawvan. He was not a candidate for re-election in 1890, and Democrat James L. O'Connor took over as Attorney-General.

In 1893, he was one of the principal instigators of a lawsuit to invalidate the redistricting act which had been passed by the Wisconsin Legislature in 1891. Through his efforts, the legislative map was thrown out by the Wisconsin Supreme Court and redrawn.

Estabrook moved to Milwaukee in 1893 to practice law there. He was elected to the Assembly from the 13th Milwaukee County district (the 13th Ward of the City of Milwaukee) in 1906 to succeed fellow Republican Henry Holle, with 1,224 votes to 905 for Socialist Henry Leetzen and 593 for Democrat Frank Gerski; he was assigned to the committee on cities (of which he was made chairman) and the joint committee on forestry. He was narrowly re-elected in 1908, with 1,280 votes to 1,253 for Democrat Charles Wall and 1029 for Socialist Charles Vogel. He did not run in 1910, and the seat was taken by Socialist George Klenzendorff.

He was elected to the Assembly for the last time in 1912 to succeed Klenzendorff (who did not run for re-election), running as a fusion anti-Socialist candidate on the Democratic ticket, even though there was also a Republican nominee. Estabrook received 1,338 votes, to 924 for Socialist Fred Leviash, 602 for Republican former Assemblyman Christoph Paulus (who had won the Republican primary election), and 41 for Prohibitionist George H. Schultz. He resumed his old post as chairman of what was now called the Committee on Municipalities. He did not run for re-election in 1914, and was succeeded by Republican Christoph Paulus.

He died unexpectedly in Milwaukee on December 3, 1918. Estabrook Park, in Shorewood, Wisconsin, is named after him.

== Legislative legacy ==
In the Assembly, Estabrook assisted in drafting one of the first bills to pass the assembly providing for a bank examiner. He was an early advocates of the idea to abolish special charters for cities, and was a member of the commission which drafted a "general charter" for use by new cities. He wrote or was instrumental in enacting laws providing for farmers' institutes, social centers, a Milwaukee County park commission, and a state park board; the law requiring examinations for admission to the bar; an anti-sweat shop law, and a law regulating tenement houses.

== Personal life and family ==
Charles Estabrook was the son of Edward Estabrook and his wife Margaret Estabrook (née Mitchell). Edward Estabrook was a native of Illinois and became an early settler of Grant County after the land was acquired from the Meskwaki, establishing his farm near Platteville in 1836. Edward Estabrook was also a member of the Wisconsin State Assembly, representing Grant County's 3rd district in the 7th Wisconsin Legislature (1854). Margaret Estabrook died in 1863, and afterward Edward Estarbook moved to Iowa.

Charles Estabrook married Jennie Hodges at Manitowoc on September 7, 1876. Together they had four sons and two daughters, though both daughters died young, in 1893. Two of their sons, Charles N. Estabrook and George A. Estabrook, served as officers in the U.S. Army during World War I.

== Electoral history ==
=== Wisconsin Assembly (1880, 1881) ===
Wisconsin Assembly, Manitowoc 3rd District Election, 1880
Party	Candidate	Votes	%	±%
General Election, November 2, 1880
Republican	Charles E. Estabrook	1,410	60.26%	
Democratic	Adolph Pfening	930	39.74%	
Plurality		480	20.51%	
Total votes		2,340	100.0%	
Republican hold				

Wisconsin Assembly, Manitowoc 3rd District Election, 1881
Party	Candidate	Votes	%	±%
General Election, November 8, 1881
Republican	Charles E. Estabrook (incumbent)	851	53.76%	−6.50%
Democratic	George Pankratz	732	46.24%	
Plurality		119	7.52%	-13.00%
Total votes		1,583	100.0%	-32.35%
Republican hold				

=== Wisconsin Assembly (1884) ===
Wisconsin Assembly, Manitowoc 3rd District Election, 1884
Party	Candidate	Votes	%	±%
General Election, November 4, 1884
Republican	Charles E. Estabrook	1,219	50.08%	+8.80%
Democratic	George Pankratz	1,215	49.92%	
Plurality		4	0.16%	-17.26%
Total votes		2,434	100.0%	+32.57%
Republican gain from Democratic		Swing	17.59%	

=== Wisconsin Attorney General (1886, 1888) ===
Wisconsin Attorney General Election, 1886
Party	Candidate	Votes	%	±%
General Election, November 2, 1886
Republican	Charles E. Estabrook	131,358	45.88%	−7.64%
Democratic	George W. Bird	115,949	40.50%	+1.97%
Labor	John E. Thomas	21,740	7.59%	
Prohibition	E. W. Chafin	17,247	6.02%	+3.42%
	Scattering	22	0.01%	
Plurality		15,409	5.38%	-9.61%
Total votes		286,316	100.0%	-10.07%
Republican hold				

Wisconsin Attorney General Election, 1888
Party	Candidate	Votes	%	±%
General Election, November 6, 1888
Republican	Charles E. Estabrook (incumbent)	176,351	49.73%	+3.85%
Democratic	Timothy E. Ryan	154,943	43.69%	+3.20%
Prohibition	Charles E. Pike	14,582	4.11%	−1.91%
Labor	Kerellio Shawvan	8,709	2.46%	−5.14%
	Scattering	19	0.01%	
Plurality		21,408	6.04%	+0.66%
Total votes		354,604	100.0%	+23.85%
Republican hold				

=== Wisconsin Assembly (1906, 1908) ===
Wisconsin Assembly, Milwaukee 13th District Election, 1906
Party	Candidate	Votes	%	±%
General Election, November 6, 1906
Republican	Charles E. Estabrook	1,224	44.97%	+5.94%
Socialist	Henry F. Leetzen	905	33.25%	−2.74%
Democratic	Frank J. Gerski	593	21.79%	−3.20%
Plurality		319	11.72%	+8.67%
Total votes		2,722	100.0%	-19.52%
Republican hold				

Wisconsin Assembly, Milwaukee 13th District Election, 1908
Party	Candidate	Votes	%	±%
General Election, November 3, 1908
Republican	Charles E. Estabrook (incumbent)	1,280	35.93%	−9.03%
Democratic	Charles F. Wall	1,253	35.18%	+13.39%
Socialist	Charles O. Vogel	1,029	28.89%	−4.36%
Plurality		27	0.76%	-10.96%
Total votes		3,562	100.0%	+30.86%
Republican hold				

=== Wisconsin Assembly (1912) ===
Wisconsin Assembly, Milwaukee 13th District Election, 1912
Party	Candidate	Votes	%	±%
General Election, November 5, 1912
Democratic	Charles E. Estabrook	1,338	46.06%	+15.18%
Socialist	Fred Leviash	924	31.81%	−9.88%
Republican	Christoph Paulus	602	20.72%	−6.71%
Prohibition	George H. Schultz	602	20.72%	
Plurality		414	14.25%	+3.45%
Total votes		2,905	100.0%	-0.99%
Democratic gain from Socialist		Swing	25.06%	

Party political offices
Preceded by Leander F. Frisby	Republican nominee for Attorney General of Wisconsin; 1886, 1888	Succeeded by James O'Neill
Wisconsin State Assembly
Preceded by William H. Hemschemeyer	Member of the Wisconsin State Assembly from the Manitowoc 3rd district January 3, 1881 – January 1, 1883	Succeeded by Wilhelm Albers
Preceded by Wilhelm Albers	Member of the Wisconsin State Assembly from the Manitowoc 3rd district January 5, 1885 – January 3, 1887	Succeeded by Reinhardt Rahr
Preceded by Henry Holle	Member of the Wisconsin State Assembly from the Milwaukee 13th district January 7, 1907 – January 2, 1911	Succeeded by George Klenzendorff
Preceded by George Klenzendorff	Member of the Wisconsin State Assembly from the Milwaukee 13th district January 6, 1913 – January 4, 1915	Succeeded by Christoph Paulus
Legal offices
Preceded by Leander F. Frisby	Attorney General of Wisconsin; January 3, 1887 – January 5, 1891	Succeeded by James L. O'Connor
