= 1907 Wisconsin Supreme Court election =

- April 2, 1907
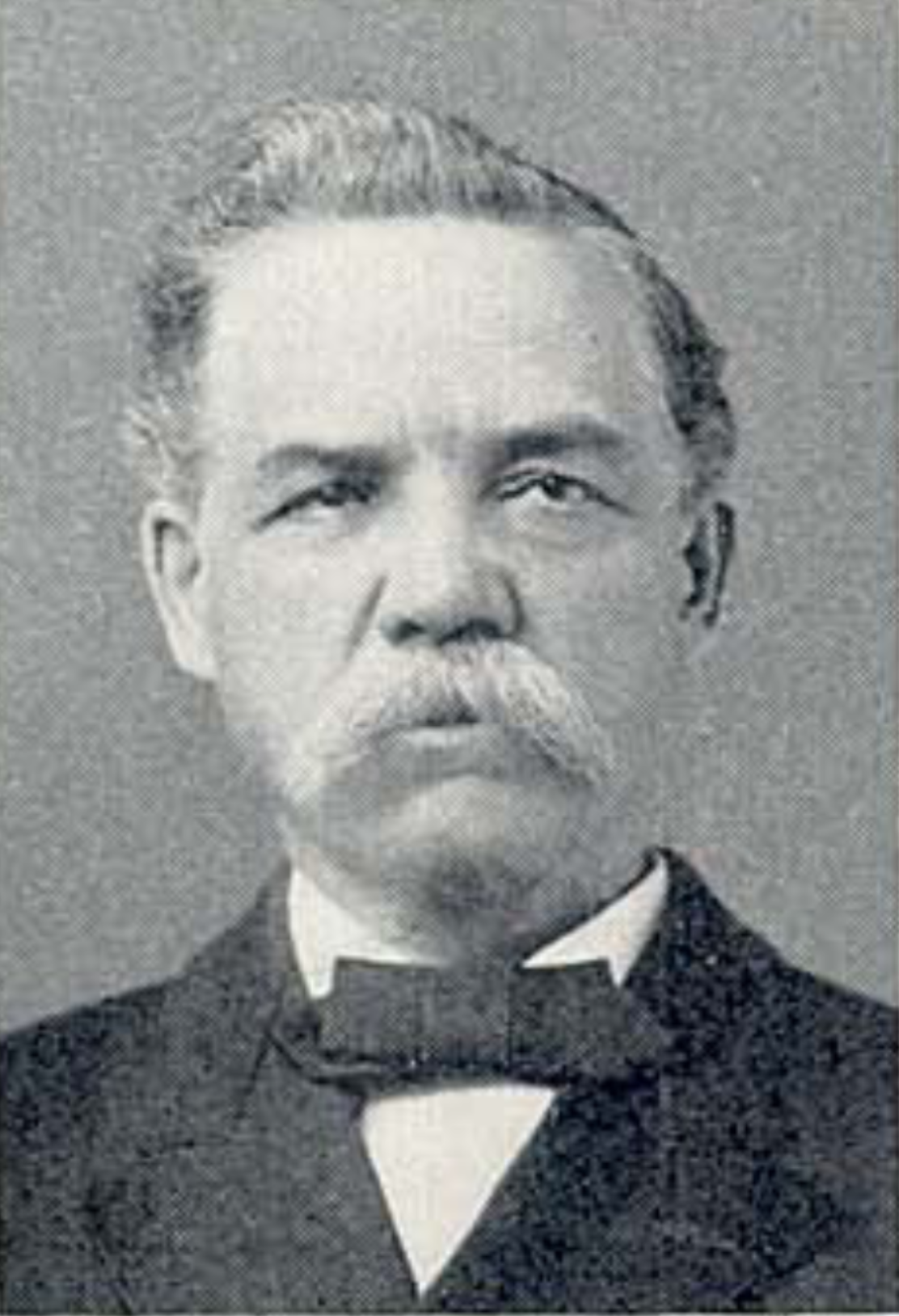

Candidate	Roujet D. Marshall	Henry Townsend Scudder
Popular vote	116,951	55,697
Percentage	67.92%	32.34%
Justice before election
Roujet D. Marshall
Elected Justice
Roujet D. Marshall

The 1907 Wisconsin Supreme Court election was held on Tuesday, April 2, 1907, to elect a justice to the Wisconsin Supreme Court for a ten-year term. Incumbent justice Roujet D. Marshall was re-elected over challenger Henry Townsend Scudder.

== Background ==
Marshall had held his seat since 1895, when Governor William Upham appointed him to fill a vacancy on the court. He was thereafter elected to the seat two times, first in the special election of 1896, being re-elected in the regular election held in 1897. He faced no opposition in either of those elections.

== Result ==
1907 Wisconsin Supreme Court election
Party	Candidate	Votes	%
General election (April 2, 1907)
Nonpartisan	Roujet D. Marshall (incumbent)	116,951	67.92
Nonpartisan	Henry Townsend Scudder	55,697	32.34
write-ins	scattering	153	0.09
Plurality		61,254	35.57
Total votes		172,201	100
