= Levi H. Bancroft =

American politician (1861-1948)

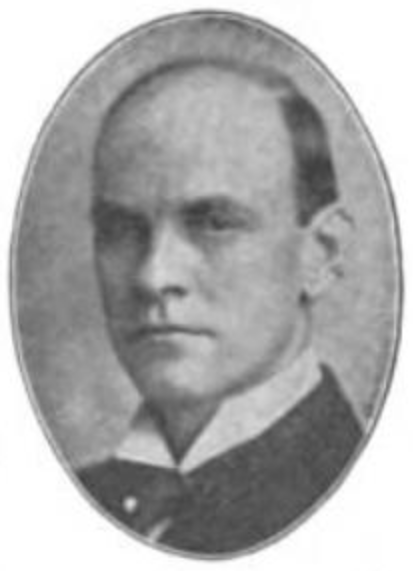

United States Attorney for the Eastern District of Wisconsin
- In office June 15, 1927 – July 1, 1932
- President: Calvin Coolidge; Herbert Hoover
- Preceded by: Roy L. Morse
- Succeeded by: Edward J. Gehl

Wisconsin Circuit Judge for the 5th circuit
- In office April 15, 1920 – June 1921
- Appointed by: Emanuel L. Philipp
- Preceded by: George Clementson
- Succeeded by: Sherman E. Smalley

20th Attorney General of Wisconsin
- In office January 2, 1911 – January 6, 1913
- Governor: Francis E. McGovern
- Preceded by: Frank L. Gilbert
- Succeeded by: Walter C. Owen

43rd Speaker of the Wisconsin State Assembly
- In office January 13, 1909 – January 2, 1911
- Preceded by: Herman Ekern
- Succeeded by: C. A. Ingram

Member of the Wisconsin State Assembly from the Richland County district
- In office January 7, 1907 – January 2, 1911
- Preceded by: J. E. Coffland
- Succeeded by: Chris Monson

District Attorney of Richland County, Wisconsin
- In office January 1, 1887 – January 1, 1889
- Preceded by: Frank W. Burnham
- Succeeded by: M. Murphy

Personal details
- Born: December 26, 1861 Sauk County, Wisconsin, U.S.
- Died: September 5, 1948 (aged 86) Richland Center, Wisconsin, U.S.
- Party: Republican
- Spouse: Myrtle DeLap (m. 1890)
- Education: University of Wisconsin Law School
- Profession: Teacher, lawyer, politician

Military service
- Allegiance: United States
- Branch/service: Wisconsin National Guard
- Years of service: 1907–1913

Levi Horace Bancroft (December 26, 1861 – September 5, 1948) was an American lawyer and progressive Republican politician from Richland County, Wisconsin. He was the 20th attorney general of Wisconsin, the 43rd speaker of the Wisconsin State Assembly, and United States Attorney for the Eastern District of Wisconsin. He also served as a Wisconsin circuit court judge and district attorney.

== Biography ==
Levi H. Bancroft was born on December 26, 1861, to George I. and Helen M. Bancroft; reports have differed on the location. He attended high school in Lone Rock, Wisconsin, and later became a teacher. In 1884, he graduated from the University of Wisconsin Law School. On June 11, 1890, Bancroft married Myrtle DeLap. From 1907 to 1913, he was a judge advocate of what is now the Wisconsin Army National Guard.

He died at his farm near Richland Center on September 5, 1948.

== Political career ==
Bancroft served as the District Attorney of Richland County, Wisconsin, from 1886 to 1888, Richland Center, Wisconsin City Attorney for six years, and City Supervisor. From 1897 to 1902, he was a county judge of Richland County. Bancroft was a delegate to the 1900 Republican National Convention. In addition, he was delegate to a number of State Republican Conventions. He would serve as an Assistant Attorney General. Bancroft was a member of the Wisconsin State Assembly from 1907 to 1910, serving as Speaker in 1909–1910. He did not run for the Assembly in 1910, and was succeeded by fellow Republican Chris Monson.

In 1910, he was elected Attorney General of Wisconsin, with 114,939 votes to 104,551 for Democrat John Doherty; 48,693 for "Progressive Republican" Charles Crownhart, and 39,399 for Social Democrat Gerrit Thorn Jr.

He was a Wisconsin Circuit Court judge. Sources are varied over his length of service. Later, he served as a U.S. Attorney in Wisconsin from 1927 to 1932. From 1934 to 1936, Bancroft was Mayor of Richland Center. He was again a county judge of Richland County from 1938 to 1948.

== See also ==
- List of attorneys general of Wisconsin

Party political offices
Preceded by Frank L. Gilbert	Republican nominee for Attorney General of Wisconsin; 1910	Succeeded by Walter C. Owen
Preceded by John W. Reynolds Sr.	Republican nominee for Attorney General of Wisconsin; 1932	Succeeded by Victor M. Stolts
Wisconsin State Assembly
Preceded by J. E. Coffland	Member of the Wisconsin State Assembly from the Richland County district January 7, 1907 – January 2, 1911	Succeeded by Chris Monson
Preceded by Herman Ekern	Speaker of the Wisconsin State Assembly; January 13, 1909 – January 2, 1911	Succeeded by C. A. Ingram
Legal offices
Preceded by Frank L. Gilbert	Attorney General of Wisconsin; 1911–1913	Succeeded by Walter C. Owen
Preceded by George Clementson	Wisconsin Circuit Judge for the 5th circuit April 15, 1920 – June 1921	Succeeded by Sherman E. Smalley
Preceded by Roy L. Morse	United States Attorney for the Eastern District of Wisconsin; June 15, 1927 – July 1, 1932	Succeeded by Edward J. Gehl
