= 1968 Wisconsin gubernatorial election =

- November 5, 1968
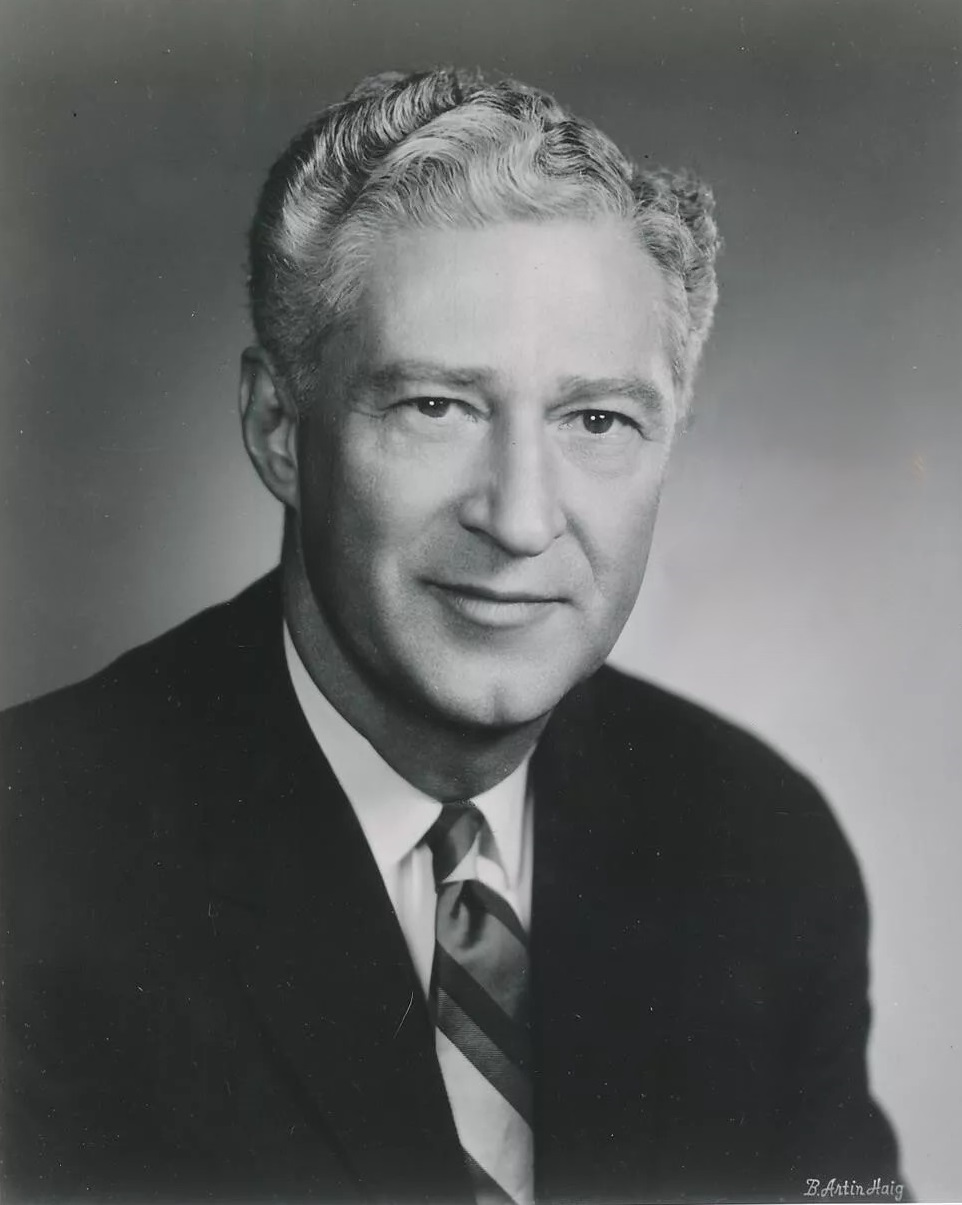

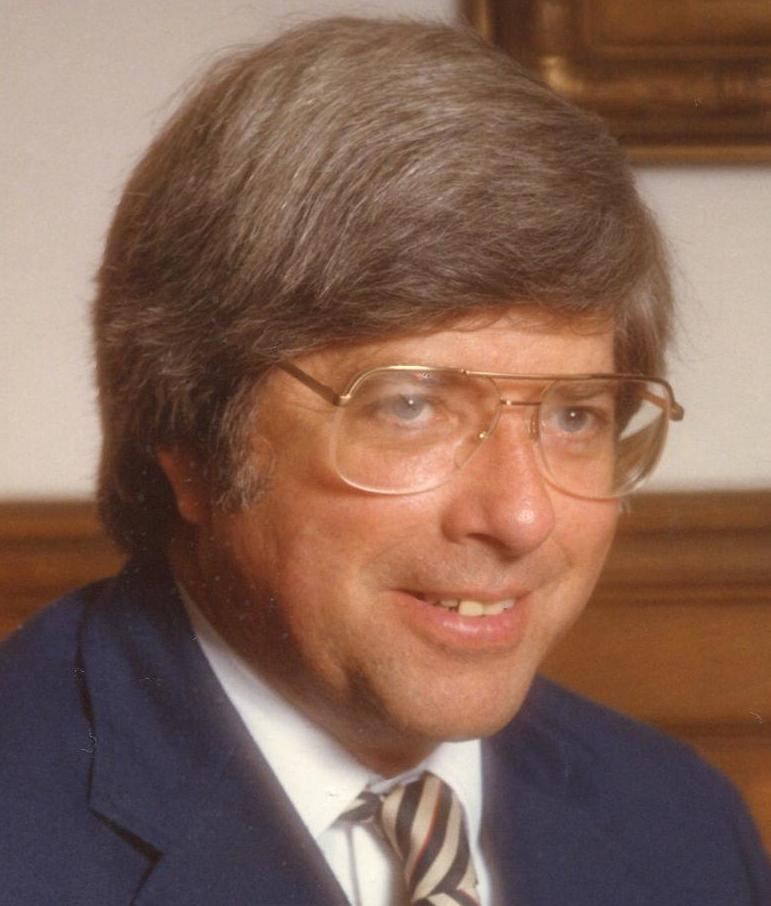
Nominee	Warren P. Knowles	Bronson C. La Follette
Party	Republican	Democratic
Popular vote	893,463	791,100
Percentage	52.88%	46.82%
- Knowles: 50–60% 60–70% 70–80% 80–90% >90% La Follette: 40–50% 50–60% 60–70% 70–80% 80–90% >90% Tie: 50%
Governor before election
Warren P. Knowles
Republican
Elected Governor
Warren P. Knowles
Republican

The 1968 Wisconsin gubernatorial election was held on November 5, 1968. Republican Warren P. Knowles won the election with 53% of the vote, winning his third term as Governor of Wisconsin and defeating Democrat Bronson C. La Follette. This was the last gubernatorial election in Wisconsin where the governor was elected to a two-year term separately from the Lieutenant Governor.

== Primary election ==
The primary election was held on September 10, 1968.

=== Republican party ===
==== Candidates ====
- Warren P. Knowles, incumbent governor

==== Results ====
Republican primary results
Party	Candidate	Votes	%
Republican	Warren P. Knowles (incumbent)	272,504	100.00%
Total votes		272,504	100.00%

=== Democratic party ===
==== Candidates ====
- Bronson C. La Follette, Attorney General of Wisconsin
- Floyd L. Wille

==== Results ====
Democratic primary results
Party	Candidate	Votes	%
Democratic	Bronson C. La Follette	173,458	84.52%
Democratic	Floyd L. Wille	31,778	15.48%
Total votes		205,236	100.00%

== General election ==
=== Candidates ===
- Warren P. Knowles, Republican
- Bronson C. La Follete, Democrat
- Adolf Wiggert, Independent
- Robert Wilkinson, Independent

=== Results ===
1968 Wisconsin gubernatorial election
Party	Candidate	Votes	%	±%
Republican	Warren P. Knowles (incumbent)	893,463	52.88%	−0.62%
Democratic	Bronson C. La Follette	791,100	46.82%	+0.73%
Independent	Adolf Wiggert	3,225	0.19%	−0.21%
Independent	Robert Wilkinson	1,813	0.11%	
	Scattering (Note: These are not listed in the Blue Book but are listed in the Board of Canvassers report.)	137	0.01%	
Majority		102,363	6.06%	
Total votes		1,689,738	100.00%	
Republican hold		Swing	-1.36%	

=== Results by county ===
Knowles was the first Republican to win without carrying Clark County since William E. Smith in 1877. Forest County, Marathon County, Rusk County, and Wood County would not vote for the losing candidate again until 2018.

County	Warren P. Knowles Republican		Bronson C. La Follette Democratic		All Others Various		Margin		Total votes cast
County	#	%	#	%	#	%	#	%	Total votes cast
Adams	1,613	44.63%	1,990	55.06%	11	0.30%	-377	-10.43%	3,614
Ashland	2,835	40.96%	4,056	58.60%	30	0.43%	-1,221	-17.64%	6,921
Barron	7,819	58.05%	5,637	41.85%	13	0.10%	2,182	16.20%	13,469
Bayfield	2,439	43.57%	3,146	56.20%	13	0.23%	-707	-12.63%	5,598
Brown	32,161	57.38%	23,608	42.12%	278	0.50%	8,553	15.26%	56,047
Buffalo	3,062	57.63%	2,246	42.27%	5	0.09%	816	15.36%	5,313
Burnett	2,380	55.16%	1,929	44.70%	6	0.14%	451	10.45%	4,315
Calumet	5,075	50.53%	4,954	49.32%	15	0.15%	121	1.20%	10,044
Chippewa	7,757	47.31%	8,625	52.60%	14	0.09%	-868	-5.29%	16,396
Clark	6,003	49.26%	6,162	50.56%	22	0.18%	-159	-1.30%	12,187
Columbia	9,065	56.32%	7,001	43.50%	30	0.19%	2,064	12.82%	16,096
Crawford	3,744	61.74%	2,313	38.14%	7	0.12%	1,431	23.60%	6,064
Dane	56,260	52.75%	49,758	46.65%	640	0.60%	6,502	6.10%	106,658
Dodge	14,492	56.29%	11,234	43.64%	18	0.07%	3,258	12.66%	25,744
Door	5,504	62.26%	3,321	37.57%	15	0.17%	2,183	24.69%	8,840
Douglas	7,572	41.98%	10,414	57.73%	53	0.29%	-2,842	-15.75%	18,039
Dunn	5,483	53.65%	4,722	46.21%	14	0.14%	761	7.45%	10,219
Eau Claire	13,007	51.87%	12,020	47.93%	51	0.20%	987	3.94%	25,078
Florence	852	51.45%	798	48.19%	6	0.36%	54	3.26%	1,656
Fond du Lac	17,916	55.24%	14,432	44.50%	86	0.27%	3,484	10.74%	32,434
Forest	1,292	42.71%	1,727	57.09%	6	0.20%	-435	-14.38%	3,025
Grant	11,265	67.07%	5,515	32.83%	17	0.10%	5,750	34.23%	16,797
Green	6,787	64.08%	3,799	35.87%	5	0.05%	2,988	28.21%	10,591
Green Lake	4,661	61.20%	2,942	38.63%	13	0.17%	1,719	22.57%	7,616
Iowa	3,920	55.73%	3,102	44.10%	12	0.17%	818	11.63%	7,034
Iron	1,462	45.63%	1,735	54.15%	7	0.22%	-273	-8.52%	3,204
Jackson	3,261	54.83%	2,672	44.93%	14	0.24%	589	9.90%	5,947
Jefferson	12,749	56.64%	9,722	43.20%	36	0.16%	3,027	13.45%	22,507
Juneau	3,957	56.39%	3,045	43.39%	15	0.21%	912	13.00%	7,017
Kenosha	19,243	45.75%	22,701	53.97%	121	0.29%	-3,458	-8.22%	42,065
Kewaunee	4,326	56.95%	3,262	42.94%	8	0.11%	1,064	14.01%	7,596
La Crosse	20,416	64.62%	11,073	35.05%	106	0.34%	9,343	29.57%	31,595
Lafayette	3,986	54.63%	3,305	45.30%	5	0.07%	681	9.33%	7,296
Langlade	3,523	49.82%	3,535	49.99%	13	0.18%	-12	-0.17%	7,071
Lincoln	4,603	49.83%	4,619	50.00%	16	0.17%	-16	-0.17%	9,238
Manitowoc	13,611	43.78%	17,344	55.79%	133	0.43%	-3,733	-12.01%	31,088
Marathon	16,430	43.41%	21,297	56.27%	118	0.31%	-4,867	-12.86%	37,845
Marinette	7,477	50.96%	7,167	48.84%	29	0.20%	310	2.11%	14,673
Marquette	2,290	60.39%	1,495	39.43%	7	0.18%	795	20.97%	3,792
Menominee	239	34.44%	452	65.13%	3	0.43%	-213	-30.69%	694
Milwaukee	195,502	47.35%	214,717	52.28%	1,518	0.37%	-20,515	-4.92%	410,737
Monroe	7,237	62.53%	4,323	37.35%	13	0.11%	2,914	25.18%	11,573
Oconto	5,469	52.41%	4,951	47.45%	15	0.14%	518	4.96%	10,435
Oneida	5,247	50.69%	5,094	49.21%	10	0.10%	153	1.48%	10,351
Outagamie	22,748	53.72%	19,469	45.97%	130	0.31%	3,279	7.74%	42,347
Ozaukee	13,437	64.99%	7,185	34.75%	55	0.27%	6,252	30.24%	20,677
Pepin	1,536	53.73%	1,321	46.20%	2	0.07%	215	7.52%	2,859
Pierce	6,045	60.35%	3,955	39.48%	17	0.17%	2,090	20.86%	10,017
Polk	6,467	57.58%	4,757	42.36%	7	0.06%	1,710	15.23%	11,231
Portage	6,921	40.29%	10,194	59.34%	64	0.37%	-3,273	-19.05%	17,179
Price	3,261	50.86%	3,139	48.96%	12	0.19%	122	1.90%	6,412
Racine	32,348	51.38%	30,335	48.18%	279	0.44%	2,013	3.20%	62,962
Richland	4,010	58.35%	2,856	41.56%	6	0.09%	1,154	16.79%	6,872
Rock	28,190	57.06%	21,125	42.76%	89	0.18%	7,065	14.30%	49,404
Rusk	2,731	46.76%	3,095	52.99%	15	0.26%	-364	-6.23%	5,841
Sauk	8,657	54.29%	7,244	45.43%	44	0.28%	1,413	8.86%	15,945
Sawyer	2,751	60.18%	1,815	39.71%	5	0.11%	936	20.48%	4,571
Shawano	7,625	58.13%	5,479	41.77%	14	0.11%	2,146	16.36%	13,118
Sheboygan	20,019	50.68%	19,260	48.76%	218	0.55%	759	1.92%	39,497
St. Croix	7,752	55.77%	6,137	44.15%	11	0.08%	1,615	11.62%	13,900
Taylor	2,642	39.15%	4,091	60.63%	15	0.22%	-1,449	-21.47%	6,748
Trempealeau	4,862	52.62%	4,368	47.27%	10	0.11%	494	5.35%	9,240
Vernon	6,136	60.23%	4,045	39.71%	6	0.06%	2,091	20.53%	10,187
Vilas	3,410	59.92%	2,267	39.83%	14	0.25%	1,143	20.08%	5,691
Walworth	15,941	66.06%	8,155	33.79%	35	0.15%	7,786	32.27%	24,131
Washburn	2,606	52.35%	2,365	47.51%	7	0.14%	241	4.84%	4,978
Washington	13,075	58.44%	9,249	41.34%	48	0.21%	3,826	17.10%	22,372
Waukesha	55,219	63.53%	31,498	36.24%	195	0.22%	23,721	27.29%	86,912
Waupaca	10,130	64.40%	5,577	35.45%	24	0.15%	4,553	28.94%	15,731
Waushara	4,266	67.88%	2,019	32.12%	0	0.00%	2,247	35.75%	6,285
Winnebago	25,713	56.25%	19,776	43.26%	224	0.49%	5,937	12.99%	45,713
Wood	11,973	49.07%	12,364	50.67%	62	0.25%	-391	-1.60%	24,399
Total	893,463	52.88%	791,100	46.82%	5,175	0.31%	102,363	6.06%	1,689,738

==== Counties that flipped from Democratic to Republican ====
- Marinette

==== Counties that flipped from Republican to Democratic ====
- Bayfield
- Chippewa
- Clark
- Langlade
- Lincoln
- Marathon
- Wood
