= Attorney General O'Connor =

Attorney General O'Connor may refer to:

- Charles O'Connor (judge) (1854–1928), Attorney-General for Ireland
- James O'Connor (Irish judge) (1872–1931), Attorney-General for Ireland
- James L. O'Connor (1858–1931), Attorney General of Wisconsin
- Kenneth O'Connor (1896–1985), Attorney General of Nyasaland, Attorney General of the Malayan Union, and Attorney General of Kenya

== See also ==
- Herbert O'Conor (1896–1960), Attorney General of Maryland
- James Conner (general) (1829–1883), Attorney General of South Carolina
- Clare E. Connors (born 1974), Attorney General of Hawaii
