= Attorney General Estabrook =

Attorney General Estabrook may refer to:

- Charles E. Estabrook (1847–1918), Attorney General of Wisconsin
- Experience Estabrook (1813–1894), Attorney General of Wisconsin
