= C. A. Ingram =

American lawyer and legislator

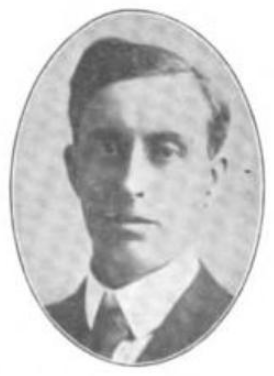

44th Speaker of the Wisconsin State Assembly
- In office January 11, 1911 – January 6, 1913
- Preceded by: Levi H. Bancroft
- Succeeded by: Merlin Hull

Member of the Wisconsin State Assembly from the Buffalo–Pepin district
- In office January 7, 1907 – January 6, 1913
- Preceded by: Fred J. Bohri
- Succeeded by: James Allison

Personal details
- Born: March 19, 1867 Waubeek, Wisconsin, U.S.
- Died: December 9, 1937 (aged 70) Durand, Wisconsin, U.S.
- Resting place: Forest Hill Cemetery, Durand, Wisconsin
- Party: Republican
- Spouse: Irmina Lloyd (m. 1890–1937)
- Children: 4
- Education: University of Wisconsin–Madison; University of Wisconsin Law School
- Profession: Lawyer

Charles Adain Ingram (March 19, 1867 – December 9, 1937) was an American lawyer and progressive Republican politician from Pepin County, Wisconsin. He served as the 44th speaker of the Wisconsin State Assembly, and represented Buffalo and Pepin counties in the Assembly for three terms.

== Biography ==
Born in Waubeek, Wisconsin, Ingram graduated from University of Wisconsin–Madison and then taught school. Ingram then graduated from University of Wisconsin Law School and then practiced law and was in the publication business. Ingram was district attorney of Pepin County, Wisconsin, and then served in the Wisconsin State Assembly 1907-1913 as a Progressive Republican and served as speaker of the Wisconsin Assembly in the 1911 session. He then went back to his law firm and publication business.

He died in Durand, Wisconsin, on December 9, 1937.

Wisconsin State Assembly
| Preceded by Fred J. Bohri | Member of the Wisconsin State Assembly from the Buffalo–Pepin district January 7, 1907 – January 6, 1913 | Succeeded by James Allison |
| Preceded by Levi H. Bancroft | Speaker of the Wisconsin State Assembly; January 11, 1911 – January 6, 1913 | Succeeded by Merlin Hull |
