= Waubeek =

Waubeek may refer to:

- Waubeek, Iowa, an unincorporated community in Linn County, Iowa
- Waubeek, Wisconsin, an incorporated community of 300 persons in Pepin County, Wisconsin
- Waubeek Mound, a mountain in Pepin County, Wisconsin
- Wawbeek, Alabama, a community in Alabama
