= Walter C. Owen =

American judge

The Honorable Walter C. Owen

Justice of the Wisconsin Supreme Court
- In office January 7, 1918 – April 15, 1934
- Preceded by: Roujet D. Marshall
- Succeeded by: Theodore G. Lewis

21st Attorney General of Wisconsin
- In office January 6, 1913 – January 7, 1918
- Governor: Francis E. McGovern; Emanuel L. Philipp
- Preceded by: Levi H. Bancroft
- Succeeded by: Spencer Haven

Member of the Wisconsin Senate from the 10th district
- In office January 7, 1907 – January 6, 1913
- Preceded by: James A. Frear
- Succeeded by: George B. Skogmo

Personal details
- Born: Walter Cecil Owen; September 26, 1868 Trenton, Pierce County, Wisconsin, U.S.
- Died: April 15, 1934 (aged 65) St. Petersburg, Florida, U.S.
- Resting place: Forest Hill Cemetery, Madison, Wisconsin
- Party: Republican
- Spouse: Alta Louella Otis
- Education: University of Wisconsin
- Occupation: Judge, politician

Walter Cecil Owen (September 26, 1868 – April 15, 1934) was an American jurist and Republican politician. He served the last 16 years of his life on the Wisconsin Supreme Court (1918–1934) and was the 21st Attorney General of Wisconsin (1913–1918). Earlier, he served six years in the Wisconsin State Senate, representing Pierce and St. Croix counties.

== Biography ==
Born in Trenton, Pierce County, Wisconsin, Owen received his law degree from the University of Wisconsin. He served in the Wisconsin State Senate and was Wisconsin Attorney General for three terms. In 1917, Owen was elected to the Wisconsin Supreme Court. After his election to the court, he resigned as attorney general in order to join the court. After being sworn-in as a justice in 1918, he served on the court until his death (having won re-election without opposition in 1927.

He died in St. Petersburg, Florida, on April 15, 1934.

Party political offices
Preceded by Levi H. Bancroft	Republican nominee for Attorney General of Wisconsin; 1912, 1914, 1916	Succeeded by John J. Blaine
Wisconsin Senate
Preceded by James A. Frear	Member of the Wisconsin Senate from the 10th district January 7, 1907 – January 6, 1913	Succeeded by George B. Skogmo
Legal offices
Preceded by Levi H. Bancroft	Attorney General of Wisconsin; January 6, 1913 – January 7, 1918	Succeeded by Spencer Haven
Preceded by Roujet D. Marshall	Justice of the Wisconsin Supreme Court; January 7, 1918 – April 15, 1934	Succeeded by Theodore G. Lewis
