= Myron P. Lotto =

American politician

Member of the Wisconsin Senate from the 2nd district
- In office 1969–1973
- Preceded by: Robert W. Warren
- Succeeded by: Tom Petri

Personal details
- Born: April 7, 1925 Green Bay, Wisconsin
- Died: October 31, 2017 (aged 92) Green Bay, Wisconsin
- Party: Republican
- Profession: Farmer

Myron P. Lotto (April 7, 1925 – October 31, 2017) was an American politician. He was a member of the Wisconsin State Senate, representing Wisconsin's 2nd Senate District from 1969 to 1973. He was a member of the Republican Party.

Lotto was born in Green Bay, Wisconsin, and went to local public and parochial schools. He graduated from Central Catholic High School. He attended St. Norbert College from 1942 to 1943. Lotto was a farmer. He was director of the Brown County Fair Association, a member of the Knights of Columbus and a member of the Holy Name Speakers Bureau. He was a town clerk for the town of Ledgeview from 1949 to 1955 and town chairman from 1955 to 1967. He was also on the Brown County, Wisconsin, Board of Supervisors. Lotto served in the Wisconsin State Guard. He died on October 31, 2017.
