= Emmett R. Hicks =

American lawyer (1854–1925)

17th Attorney General of Wisconsin
- In office January 2, 1899 – January 5, 1903
- Preceded by: William H. Mylrea
- Succeeded by: Lafayette M. Sturdevant

Personal details
- Born: March 7, 1854 Waukau, Wisconsin, U.S.
- Died: October 27, 1925 (aged 71) Oshkosh, Wisconsin, U.S.
- Cause of death: Traffic collision
- Resting place: Omro Cemetery, Omro, Wisconsin
- Party: Republican
- Spouse: Cynthia M. Reed (m. 1880–1925)
- Children: Bert Reed Hicks^{(b. 1886; died 1912)}; Luther Reuben Hicks^{(b. 1891; died 1912)}; William E. Hicks^{(b. 1896; died 1968)}
- Education: University of Wisconsin
- Profession: Lawyer

Emmett Reuben Hicks (March 7, 1854 – October 27, 1925) was an American lawyer and Republican politician from Oshkosh, Wisconsin. He was the 17th attorney general of Wisconsin, serving from 1899 to 1903. Earlier, he also served as chairman of the Winnebago County Board of Supervisors.

== Biography ==
Emmett Hicks was born in Waukau, Wisconsin, in Winnebago County. Shortly after his birth, he moved with his parents to nearby Omro, Wisconsin, where he was raised and educated, graduating from Omro High School in 1870. After completing his primary education, Hicks taught school in Omro for three years before attending the University of Wisconsin in Madison, Wisconsin, where he earned his bachelor's degree in 1876. He subsequently entered the law course at the University of Wisconsin, earning his LL.B. in 1880.

After completing his legal education, Hicks began a law practice in Oshkosh, Wisconsin. He served as Wisconsin Attorney General from 1899 to 1903 as a Republican.

Hicks died in Oshkosh when he was run over twice by the same car while crossing the street.

== Electoral history ==
=== Wisconsin Attorney General (1898, 1900) ===
Wisconsin Attorney General Election, 1898
| Party | Candidate | Votes | % | ±% |
|---|---|---|---|---|
General Election, November 8, 1898
| Republican | Emmett R. Hicks | 180,169 | 55.33% | −4.67pp |
| Democratic | Harry Holder Grace | 125,504 | 38.54% | +0.67pp |
| Populist | Lester Woodward | 7,968 | 2.45% | +0.92pp |
| Prohibition | Wesley Mott | 7,573 | 2.33% | +2.02pp |
| Social Democratic | Richard Elsner | 2,608 | 0.80% | |
| Socialist Labor | Julius Andreesen | 1,560 | 0.48% | +0.19pp |
| | Scattering | 234 | 0.07% | |
| Plurality | | 54,665 | 16.79% | -5.34pp |
| Total votes | | 325,616 | 100.0% | -26.46% |
| Republican hold | | | | |

Wisconsin Attorney General Election, 1900
| Party | Candidate | Votes | % | ±% |
|---|---|---|---|---|
General Election, November 6, 1900
| Republican | Emmett R. Hicks (incumbent) | 263,486 | 59.74% | +4.41pp |
| Democratic | George C. Cooper | 160,130 | 36.31% | −2.24pp |
| Prohibition | Eugene W. Chafin | 10,168 | 2.31% | −0.02pp |
| Social Democratic | Richard Elsner | 6,737 | 1.53% | +0.73pp |
| Socialist Labor | N. E. Hanson | 509 | 0.12% | −0.36pp |
| Plurality | | 103,356 | 23.44% | +6.65pp |
| Total votes | | 441,030 | 100.0% | +35.44% |
| Republican hold | | | | |

Party political offices
| Preceded by William H. Mylrea | Republican nominee for Attorney General of Wisconsin; 1898, 1900 | Succeeded by Lafayette M. Sturdevant |
Legal offices
| Preceded by William H. Mylrea | Attorney General of Wisconsin; 1899–1903 | Succeeded by Lafayette M. Sturdevant |
