= Chandlers Valley, Pennsylvania =

Unincorporated community in Pennsylvania, US

- Unincorporated community
- Location within Pennsylvania
- Coordinates: 41°56′03″N 79°18′13″W
- Country: United States
- State: Pennsylvania
- County: Warren
- Elevation: 1,506 ft (459 m)
- Time zone: UTC-5 (Eastern (EST))
  - Summer (DST): UTC-4 (EDT)
- ZIP code: 16312
- Area code: 814
- GNIS feature ID: 1171556

Chandlers Valley is an unincorporated community in Warren County, Pennsylvania, United States. Chandlers Valley has a post office with ZIP code 16312.

== Climate ==
Climate data for CHANDLERS VALLEY 1SE, PA (1991-2020 normals) (Records 2004-Present)
Month	Jan	Feb	Mar	Apr	May	Jun	Jul	Aug	Sep	Oct	Nov	Dec	Year
Record high °F (°C)	65 (18)	73 (23)	80 (27)	85 (29)	91 (33)	93 (34)	98 (37)	91 (33)	92 (33)	85 (29)	76 (24)	65 (18)	98 (37)
Mean daily maximum °F (°C)	30.7 (−0.7)	33.5 (0.8)	42.7 (5.9)	56.7 (13.7)	68.4 (20.2)	76.9 (24.9)	80.4 (26.9)	78.7 (25.9)	72.6 (22.6)	59.6 (15.3)	46.5 (8.1)	35.6 (2.0)	56.9 (13.8)
Daily mean °F (°C)	22.0 (−5.6)	22.9 (−5.1)	31.3 (−0.4)	43.3 (6.3)	54.2 (12.3)	63.0 (17.2)	66.8 (19.3)	65.4 (18.6)	59.1 (15.1)	47.8 (8.8)	37.1 (2.8)	27.9 (−2.3)	45.1 (7.3)
Mean daily minimum °F (°C)	13.2 (−10.4)	12.3 (−10.9)	19.9 (−6.7)	29.9 (−1.2)	40.1 (4.5)	49.2 (9.6)	53.2 (11.8)	52.2 (11.2)	45.6 (7.6)	36.0 (2.2)	27.6 (−2.4)	20.2 (−6.6)	33.3 (0.7)
Record low °F (°C)	−21 (−29)	−32 (−36)	−25 (−32)	8 (−13)	22 (−6)	30 (−1)	37 (3)	38 (3)	27 (−3)	19 (−7)	2 (−17)	−14 (−26)	−32 (−36)
Average precipitation inches (mm)	3.73 (95)	2.47 (63)	3.36 (85)	4.17 (106)	4.39 (112)	4.61 (117)	5.52 (140)	4.09 (104)	4.22 (107)	4.33 (110)	3.97 (101)	4.01 (102)	48.87 (1,241)
Average snowfall inches (cm)	31.4 (80)	26.5 (67)	12.7 (32)	6.7 (17)	0.1 (0.25)	0.0 (0.0)	0.0 (0.0)	0.0 (0.0)	0.0 (0.0)	0.6 (1.5)	9.7 (25)	28.0 (71)	115.7 (294)
Average precipitation days (≥ 0.01 in)	21.2	17.3	15.5	16.3	14.4	14.2	13.1	12.6	11.3	16.5	15.5	19.4	187.3
Average snowy days (≥ 0.1 in)	13.4	11.7	6.3	2.8	0.1	0.0	0.0	0.0	0.0	0.4	3.9	10.2	48.8
Source: NOAA

== Notable people ==
- Rob Buck, founding member of the alternative rock band 10,000 Maniacs
- Lafayette M. Sturdevant (1856–1923), Wisconsin Attorney General, was born in Chandlers Valley.
