= Lafayette M. Sturdevant =

American politician (1856–1923)

18th Attorney General of Wisconsin
- In office January 5, 1903 – January 7, 1907
- Governor: Robert M. La Follette; James O. Davidson
- Preceded by: Emmett R. Hicks
- Succeeded by: Frank L. Gilbert

Member of the Wisconsin State Assembly from the Clark County district
- In office January 2, 1899 – January 5, 1903
- Preceded by: Joseph C. Marsh
- Succeeded by: William S. Irvine

Personal details
- Born: Lafayette Monroe Sturdevant; September 17, 1856 Chandlers Valley, Pennsylvania, U.S.
- Died: August 25, 1923 (aged 66) Quincy, Illinois, U.S.
- Party: Republican
- Occupation: Politician, lawyer

Lafayette Monroe Sturdevant (September 17, 1856 – August 25, 1923) was an American politician and lawyer who served as the 18th Attorney General of Wisconsin from 1903 to 1907.

== Formative years ==
Born in Chandlers Valley, Pennsylvania in Warren County, Sturdevant and his family settled in Clark County, Wisconsin. There, Sturdevant taught school and studied law.

== Career ==
After being admitted to the Wisconsin bar in 1878, he practiced law and was elected District Attorney of Clark County. In 1899–1903, he served in the Wisconsin State Assembly and was Wisconsin Attorney General from 1903–1907. After serving as private counsel to Wisconsin Governor James O. Davidson, Sturdevant resumed his law practice.

== Death ==
Sturdevant died suddenly in a hospital in Quincy, Illinois, while visiting family and friends.

== Notes ==
Legal offices
Preceded by Emmett R. Hicks	Attorney General of Wisconsin; 1903–1907	Succeeded by Frank L. Gilbert
