= Robert W. Warren =

American judge (1925–1998)

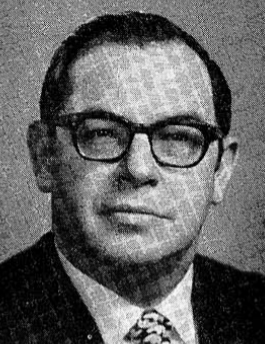

Senior Judge of the United States District Court for the Eastern District of Wisconsin
- In office August 1, 1991 – August 20, 1998

Judge of the United States Foreign Intelligence Surveillance Court of Review
- In office October 30, 1989 – May 18, 1996
- Appointed by: William Rehnquist
- Preceded by: John A. Field Jr.
- Succeeded by: Laurence Silberman

Chief Judge of the United States District Court for the Eastern District of Wisconsin
- In office August 31, 1986 – August 1, 1991
- Preceded by: John W. Reynolds Jr.
- Succeeded by: Terence T. Evans

Judge of the United States District Court for the Eastern District of Wisconsin
- In office August 27, 1974 – August 1, 1991
- Nominated by: Richard Nixon
- Appointed by: Gerald Ford
- Preceded by: Robert Emmet Tehan
- Succeeded by: Rudolph T. Randa

37th Attorney General of Wisconsin
- In office January 6, 1969 – August 27, 1974
- Governor: Warren P. Knowles; Patrick Lucey
- Preceded by: Bronson La Follette
- Succeeded by: Victor A. Miller

Member of the Wisconsin Senate from the 2nd district
- In office January 1965 – January 1969
- Preceded by: Leo P. O'Brien
- Succeeded by: Myron P. Lotto

Personal details
- Born: Robert Willis Warren; August 30, 1925 Raton, New Mexico
- Died: August 20, 1998 (aged 72) Milwaukee, Wisconsin
- Resting place: Mount Olive Cemetery; Sturgeon Bay, Wisconsin
- Party: Republican
- Spouse: Laverne Voagen (m. 1948–1998; died 2011)
- Children: Cheryl W. (Sensenbrenner); Treva W. (Livesey); Tara; Iver E. Gregg A. Lyle D.
- Parents: George R. Warren (father); Clara D. (Jolliffe) Warren (mother)
- Education: Macalester College (B.A.); University of Minnesota (M.A.); University of Wisconsin Law School (J.D.)

Military service
- Allegiance: United States
- Branch/service: United States Army
- Years of service: 1943–1946
- Unit: 95th Infantry Division
- Battles/wars: World War II
- Awards: Purple Heart

Robert Willis Warren (August 30, 1925 – August 20, 1998) was a United States district judge for the Eastern District of Wisconsin. He had previously served as attorney general of Wisconsin and represented Brown and Calumet Counties in the Wisconsin State Senate.

== Education and career ==
Born in Raton, New Mexico, Warren received a Bachelor of Arts degree from Macalester College in 1950, a Master of Arts from the University of Minnesota in 1951, and a Juris Doctor from the University of Wisconsin Law School in 1956. He was in the United States Army, 95th Infantry, from 1943 to 1946. He served in Europe during World War II and was wounded in France, receiving a Purple Heart. He became a foreign affairs officer in the United States Department of State from 1951 to 1953. Warren practiced law in Elkhorn, Wisconsin, from 1956 to 1957, and then moved to Green Bay, where he practiced law from 1957 to 1959. He was an assistant district attorney of Brown County, Wisconsin, from 1959 to 1961, and became district attorney from 1961 to 1965. Warren was a member of the Wisconsin State Senate from 1965 to 1969. From 1969 until his resignation in 1974, he was attorney general of Wisconsin.

== Federal judicial service ==
Warren was nominated by President Richard Nixon on August 8, 1974, to a seat on the United States District Court for the Eastern District of Wisconsin vacated by Judge Robert Emmet Tehan. He was confirmed by the United States Senate on August 22, 1974, and received his commission on August 27, 1974. He served as chief judge from 1986 to 1991. He was appointed a judge of the United States Foreign Intelligence Surveillance Court of Review by Chief Justice William Rehnquist in 1989, serving until 1996. He assumed senior status on August 1, 1991. His service terminated on August 20, 1998, due to his death in Milwaukee.

Party political offices
Preceded by Louis J. Ceci	Republican nominee for Attorney General of Wisconsin; 1968, 1970	Succeeded by Gerald Lorge
Legal offices
Preceded by Bronson La Follette	Attorney General of Wisconsin; 1969–1974	Succeeded by Victor A. Miller
Preceded by Robert Emmet Tehan	Judge of the United States District Court for the Eastern District of Wisconsin; 1974–1991	Succeeded by Rudolph T. Randa
Preceded by John W. Reynolds Jr.	Chief Judge of the United States District Court for the Eastern District of Wisconsin; 1986–1991	Succeeded by Terence T. Evans
Preceded by John A. Field Jr.	Judge of the United States Foreign Intelligence Surveillance Court of Review; 1989–1996	Succeeded by Laurence Silberman
