= Frank L. Gilbert =

20th century American politician

19th Attorney General of Wisconsin
- In office January 7, 1907 – January 2, 1911
- Governor: James O. Davidson
- Preceded by: Lafayette M. Sturdevant
- Succeeded by: Levi H. Bancroft

County Judge of Dane County, Wisconsin
- In office January 6, 1927 – June 1, 1927
- Appointed by: Fred R. Zimmerman
- Preceded by: Albert G. Zimmerman
- Succeeded by: George Kroncke

District Attorney of Dane County, Wisconsin
- In office January 1, 1903 – January 1, 1907
- Preceded by: Matthew S. Dudgeon
- Succeeded by: Vroman Mason

Personal details
- Born: March 3, 1864 Arena, Wisconsin, U.S.
- Died: October 10, 1930 (aged 66) Madison, Wisconsin, U.S.
- Resting place: Forest Hill Cemetery, Madison
- Party: Republican
- Spouse: Mary L. Kylen (m. 1899–1930)
- Profession: Lawyer

Frank L. Gilbert (March 3, 1864 – October 10, 1930) was an American lawyer and judge from Dane County, Wisconsin. He was the 19th attorney general of Wisconsin, and served as a county judge and district attorney of Dane County. His name was frequently abbreviated as F. L. Gilbert.

== Biography ==
A Republican, Gilbert was born on March 3, 1864, in Arena, Wisconsin. He entered law school at age 32 and passed the bar exam in 1897. He served as district attorney of Dane County from 1902 to 1907, after which he served as the state's attorney general. He was appointed county judge for Dane County in 1927 by Governor Fred R. Zimmerman. After that he served on the state's conservation commission and practiced law in Madison. He died in Madison, Wisconsin, following an operation for appendicitis.

Party political offices
Preceded by Lafayette M. Sturdevant	Republican nominee for Attorney General of Wisconsin; 1906, 1908	Succeeded by Levi H. Bancroft
Legal offices
Preceded by Matthew S. Dudgeon	District Attorney of Dane County, Wisconsin; January 1, 1903 – January 1, 1907	Succeeded by Vroman Mason
Preceded by Lafayette M. Sturdevant	Attorney General of Wisconsin; January 7, 1907 – January 2, 1911	Succeeded by Levi H. Bancroft
Preceded by Albert G. Zimmerman	County Judge of Dane County, Wisconsin; January 6, 1927 – June 1, 1927	Succeeded by George Kroncke
