= 1897 Wisconsin Supreme Court election =

- April 6, 1897
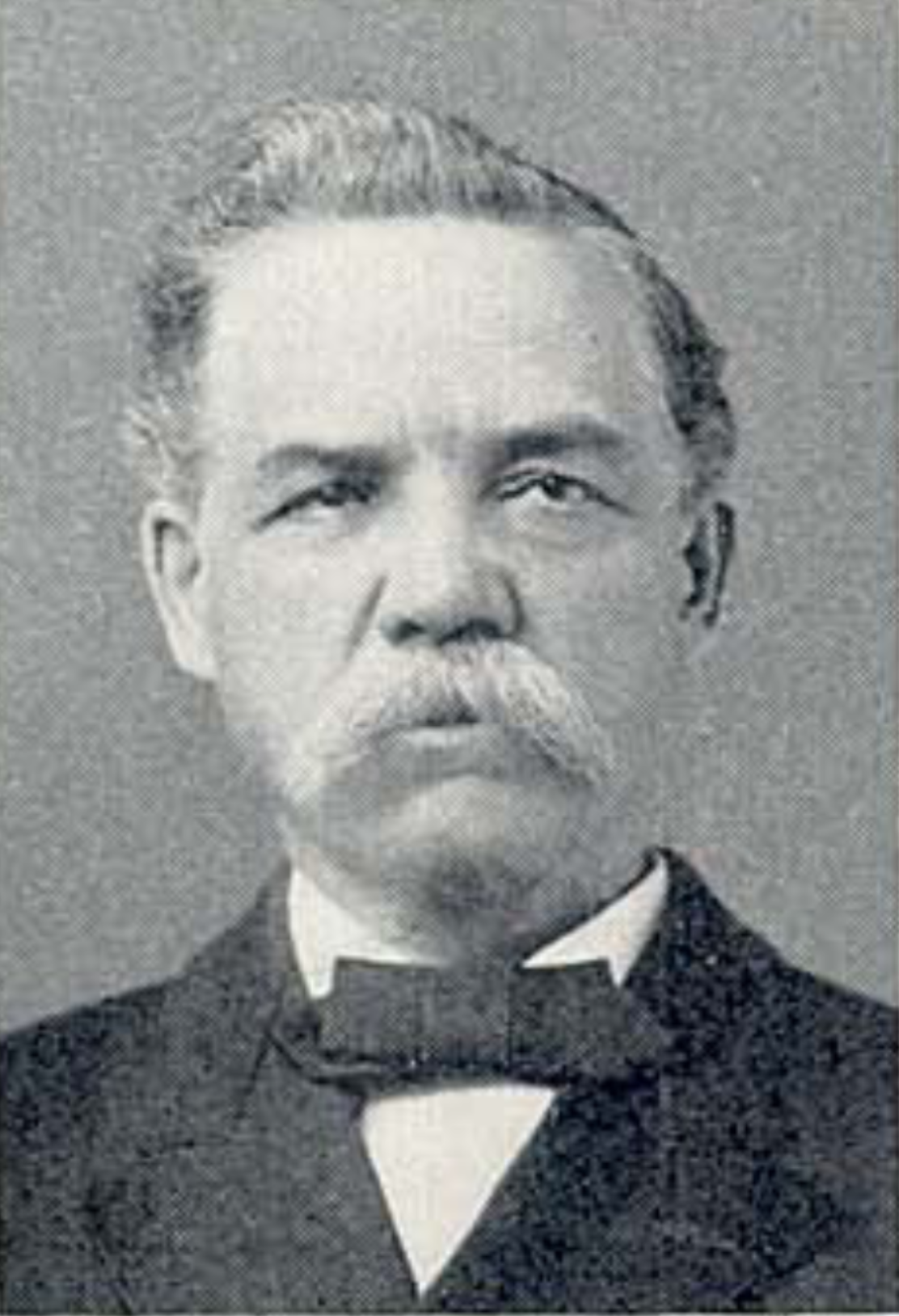
Candidate	Roujet D. Marshall
Popular vote	119,397
Percentage	99.85%
Justice before election
Roujet D. Marshall
Elected Justice
Roujet D. Marshall

The 1897 Wisconsin Supreme Court election was held on Tuesday, April 6, 1897, to elect a justice to the Wisconsin Supreme Court for a ten-year term. Incumbent justice Roujet D. Marshall, who was unopposed.

== Background ==
Marshall had held his seat since 1895, when Governor William Upham appointed him to fill a vacancy on the court. He was thereafter elected in a special election held in 1896. He faced no opposition in either of those elections.

== Result ==
1897 Wisconsin Supreme Court election
Party	Candidate	Votes	%
General election (April 6, 1897)
Nonpartisan	Roujet D. Marshall (incumbent)	119,397	99.85
write-ins	scattering	153	0.13
Blank ballots		2,709	–
Total votes		119,572	100
