= Don Hanaway =

20th-century American politician

The Honorable Don Hanaway
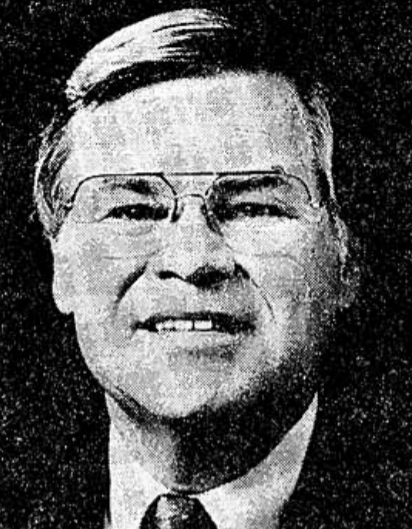

40th Attorney General of Wisconsin
- In office January 3, 1987 – January 7, 1991
- Governor: Tommy Thompson
- Preceded by: Bronson La Follette
- Succeeded by: Jim Doyle

Wisconsin Circuit Judge for the Brown Circuit, Branch 4
- In office July 1991 – September 7, 1995
- Appointed by: Tommy Thompson
- Preceded by: John Jaekels
- Succeeded by: William C. Griesbach

Member of the Wisconsin Senate from the 2nd district
- In office July 11, 1979 – January 3, 1987
- Preceded by: Tom Petri
- Succeeded by: Robert Cowles

27th Mayor of De Pere, Wisconsin
- In office April 1972 – April 1974
- Preceded by: Roger H. Rebman
- Succeeded by: Robert P. DeGroot

Personal details
- Born: December 25, 1933 Stevens Point, Wisconsin, U.S.
- Died: September 7, 1995 (aged 61) Green Bay, Wisconsin, U.S.
- Resting place: Allouez Catholic Cemetery and Chapel Mausoleum; Green Bay, Wisconsin
- Party: Republican
- Spouse: Jo Ann
- Children: 4
- Education: University of Wisconsin–Madison; University of Wisconsin Law School
- Profession: attorney, judge

Military service
- Allegiance: United States
- Branch/service: United States Army
- Years of service: 1954–1956

Donald J. Hanaway (December 25, 1933 – September 7, 1995) was an American lawyer, jurist, and Republican politician from De Pere, Wisconsin. He was the 40th attorney general of Wisconsin, serving from 1987 to 1991, and subsequently served the last four years of his life as a Wisconsin circuit court judge in Brown County. Earlier in his career, he was the 27th mayor of De Pere (1972–1974) and served eight years in the Wisconsin Senate (1979–1987).

== Biography ==
Hanaway was born in Stevens Point, Wisconsin. He graduated from the University of Wisconsin–Madison School of Commerce in 1958, and received his juris doctor from the University of Wisconsin Law School in 1961. He had previously served in the United States Army from 1954 to 1956.

Before being elected Attorney General, Hanaway served as a Brown County Assistant District Attorney from 1962 to 1964, and later as a special prosecutor in Brown County from 1967 to 1968. He also served concurrently as the De Pere city attorney from 1965 to 1972, and again from 1976 to 1979. In between those stints as city attorney, he served as mayor of De Pere from 1972 to 1974.

Hanaway was elected as a Republican in a special election to the Wisconsin State Senate in July 1979. He was re-elected to the State Senate's 2nd District in 1980, and again in 1984. He served as an assistant minority leader from 1981 to 1982.

In 1986, Hanaway ran for attorney general, defeating incumbent Bronson La Follette. He served one term, being defeated for re-election by Jim Doyle in 1990.

Hanaway went on to serve as a Brown County Circuit Judge from 1991 until his death in 1995. Hanaway died from cancer at a hospital in Green Bay, Wisconsin. He and his wife, Jo Ann, had four children.

== Electoral history ==
- 1990 Race for state Attorney General
  - Jim Doyle (D), 51%
  - Don Hanaway (R) (inc.), 47%

== Notes ==
Party political offices
Preceded by Marc Gumz	Republican nominee for Attorney General of Wisconsin; 1986, 1990	Succeeded by Jeff Wagner
Wisconsin Senate
Preceded by Tom Petri	Member of the Wisconsin Senate from the 2nd district July 11, 1979 – January 3, 1987	Succeeded by Robert Cowles
Political offices
Preceded by Roger H. Rebman	Mayor of De Pere, Wisconsin; April 1972 – April 1974	Succeeded by Robert P. DeGroot
Legal offices
Preceded by Bronson La Follette	Attorney General of Wisconsin; 1987–1991	Succeeded by Jim Doyle
Preceded by John Jaekels	Wisconsin Circuit Judge for the Brown Circuit, Branch 4 July 1991 – September 7, 1995	Succeeded by William C. Griesbach
