= George Klenzendorff =

US architect and politician

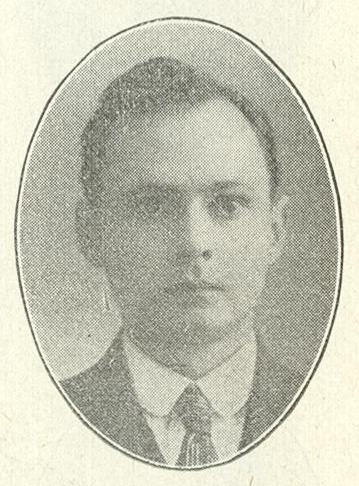
Klenzendorff's official State Assembly portrait, 1911

George Erwin Klenzendorff (January 23, 1883 – June 2, 1959) was a German-American architect from Milwaukee, Wisconsin, who served one term as a Socialist member of the Wisconsin State Assembly.

== Background ==
Klenzendorff was born in Rosenberg, West Prussia, in the German Empire on January 23, 1883. He attended schools in different parts of Germany up to 1893, when he and his parents emigrated to the United States, coming directly to Milwaukee. After graduating from the Milwaukee Public Schools, he attended a local business college for one year and studied art for three years under what his official biography described as "the direction of Milwaukee's foremost artists." In 1903 he began an apprenticeship in the office of a local architect.

== Legislative service ==
In 1910, Klenzendorff was elected to the 13th Milwaukee County assembly district (the 13th Ward of the City of Milwaukee) to succeed Republican Charles E. Estabrook, who did not run for re-election. Klenzendorff received 1,123 votes to 906 for Democrat Leander J. Pierson and 805 for Republican Louis H. Jeske. He was assigned to the joint committee on finance and to the standing committee on parks, playgrounds, and city planning.

In 1912, Klenzendorff did not run for re-election, and the seat was reclaimed by Estabrook (now running as a fusion anti-Socialist candidate on the Democratic ticket, even though there was also a Republican nominee).

== After the legislature ==
Klenzendorff returned to private architectural practice, except for a brief period in 1937–1938 working for the United States Department of Agriculture.

He died in 1959 in Milwaukee.
