= George Thompson (Wisconsin politician) =

American politician (1918–1982)

George G. Thompson
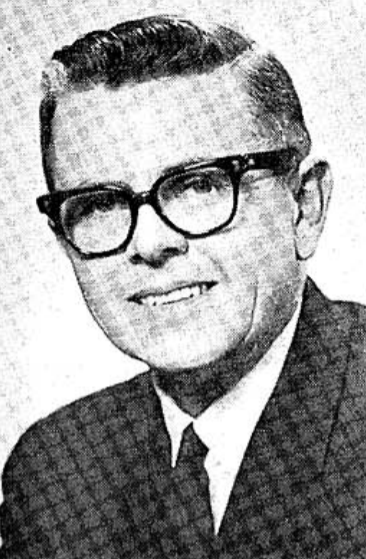

35th Attorney General of Wisconsin
- In office January 7, 1963 – January 4, 1965
- Governor: John W. Reynolds Jr.
- Preceded by: John W. Reynolds, Jr.
- Succeeded by: Bronson La Follette

Personal details
- Born: July 6, 1918 Saint Paul, Minnesota, US
- Died: November 11, 1982 (aged 64) Springfield, Massachusetts, US
- Party: Republican
- Profession: Lawyer

George Ellsworth Grinde Thompson (July 6, 1918 – November 11, 1982) was an American politician who served as the 35th Attorney General of Wisconsin from 1963 to 1965.

Thompson was born on July 6, 1918 in Saint Paul, Minnesota, the son of George Thompson and Hilda Christine Grinde. He received his public education in Hudson, Wisconsin. George Thompson attended the University of Wisconsin–River Falls 1936–37, and then St. Olaf College, Northfield, Minnesota, where he received his B.A. degree in 1940. He then attended the University of Wisconsin–Madison, where he received an M.A. degree in 1941 and an LL.B. degree in 1947. He was a practicing attorney from 1947 until his death. A World War II veteran, he served in the United States Army 1942–45. George Thompson served as a police and fire commissioner for La Crosse, Wisconsin 1952–54, and was then elected La Crosse County, Wisconsin District Attorney 1955–1961. Thompson then taught law at Ohio Northern University and Western New England University. Thompson died on 11 November 1982 in a hospital in Springfield, Massachusetts from a long illness.

Party political offices
Preceded by Stewart G. Honeck	Republican nominee for Attorney General of Wisconsin; 1960, 1962, 1964	Succeeded by Louis J. Ceci
Legal offices
Preceded by John W. Reynolds, Jr.	Attorney General of Wisconsin; 1963–1965	Succeeded by Bronson La Follette
