= Spencer Haven =

American politician (1868–1938)

22nd Attorney General of Wisconsin
- In office January 7, 1918 – January 6, 1919
- Governor: Emanuel L. Philipp
- Preceded by: Walter C. Owen
- Succeeded by: John J. Blaine

Personal details
- Born: January 16, 1868; Floyd, Iowa, U.S.
- Died: December 20, 1938 (aged 70)
- Political party: Republican
- Education: Iowa State College (BS); University of Wisconsin Law School
- Occupation: Politician

Spencer Haven (January 16, 1868 – December 20, 1938) was an American politician who served as the 22nd Attorney General of Wisconsin from 1918 to 1919.

Haven was born in Floyd, Iowa, on January 16, 1868. He graduated in 1890 with a B.S. degree from Iowa State College. He attended law school at the University of Wisconsin–Madison, and was admitted to the state bar in 1895.

Haven was Attorney General from 1918 to 1919. Previously, he had been a member of the Republican State Central Committee from 1905 to 1906.

Haven died on December 20, 1938.

Legal offices
Preceded by Walter C. Owen	Attorney General of Wisconsin; 1918–1919	Succeeded by John J. Blaine
