= William H. Mylrea =

American politician (1853–1916)

16th Attorney General of Wisconsin
- In office January 7, 1895 – January 2, 1899
- Preceded by: James L. O'Connor
- Succeeded by: Emmett R. Hicks

Personal details
- Born: William Henry Mylrea; January 1, 1853 Rochester, New York, U.S.
- Died: September 11, 1916 (aged 63) Wausau, Wisconsin, U.S.
- Party: Republican
- Education: Lawrence College
- Occupation: Politician, lawyer

William Henry Mylrea (January 1, 1853 – September 11, 1916) was an American politician and lawyer who served as the 16th Attorney General of Wisconsin from 1895 to 1899.

Born in Rochester, New York, he moved to what is now Wisconsin Dells, Wisconsin, as a child. After attending Lawrence College, Myrlea was admitted to the Wisconsin bar. He then moved to Wausau, Wisconsin, to practice law and to work in the insurance, lumber, real estate business. He served as Marathon County, Wisconsin, District Attorney in 1886. He served as Wisconsin Attorney General from 1895 to 1899 as a Republican. He died at his home in Wausau after two years of illness.

Legal offices
Preceded by James L. O'Connor	Attorney General of Wisconsin; 1895–1899	Succeeded by Emmett R. Hicks
