= Victor A. Miller =

American politician

38th Wisconsin Attorney General
- In office October 8, 1974 – November 25, 1974
- Governor: Patrick J. Lucey
- Preceded by: Robert W. Warren
- Succeeded by: Bronson La Follette

Personal details
- Born: August 27, 1916 Eaton, Wisconsin
- Died: July 18, 1984 (aged 67)
- Party: Democratic Party of Wisconsin
- Education: Marquette University (BA); Marquette University (JD)
- Profession: Lawyer

Victor Andrew Miller (August 27, 1916 – July 18, 1984) was interim Attorney General of Wisconsin from October 8 until November 25, 1974.

== Background ==
Born in the Town of Eaton, Manitowoc County, Wisconsin, Miller received his bachelor's degree from Marquette University, in 1938, and his Juris Doctor degree from Marquette University Law School in 1940. Miller practiced law in Manitowoc, Wisconsin. He was appointed by Governor Patrick J. Lucey to fill a vacancy upon the resignation of Robert W. Warren, and resigned when Governor Lucey appointed Bronson La Follette, who had been elected Attorney General of Wisconsin in the 1974 election. Miller lived in St. Nazianz, Wisconsin.
