= Bronson La Follette =

American politician

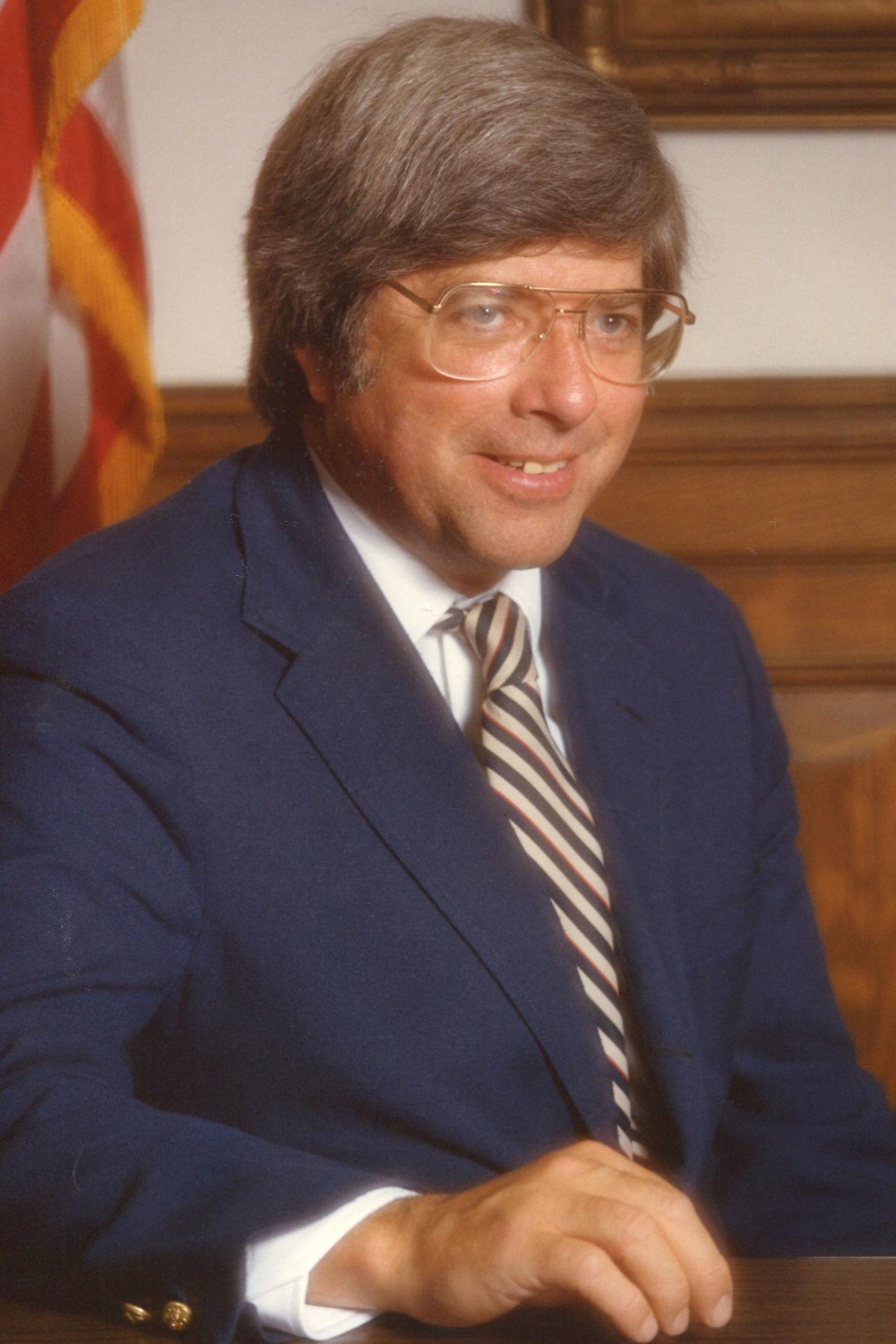
- 1980s portrait photograph of La Follette

36th and 39th Attorney General of Wisconsin
- In office January 3, 1975 – January 3, 1987
- Governor: Patrick J. Lucey; Martin J. Schreiber; Lee S. Dreyfus; Anthony S. Earl
- Preceded by: Victor A. Miller
- Succeeded by: Don Hanaway
- In office January 3, 1965 – January 3, 1969
- Governor: Warren P. Knowles
- Preceded by: George Thompson
- Succeeded by: Robert W. Warren

Personal details
- Born: Bronson Cutting La Follette; February 2, 1936 Washington, D.C., U.S.
- Died: March 15, 2018 (aged 82) Madison, Wisconsin, U.S.
- Party: Democratic
- Spouse: Barbara La Follette
- Children: 2
- Parent: Robert M. La Follette Jr. (father)
- Relatives: Robert M. La Follette, Sr. (grandfather); Philip La Follette (uncle); Doug La Follette (third cousin); La Follette family
- Education: University of Wisconsin, Madison (BA, JD)
- Profession: Lawyer

Bronson Cutting La Follette (February 2, 1936 – March 15, 2018) was an American Democratic lawyer and politician. He was the 36th and 39th Attorney General of the state of Wisconsin and was an unsuccessful candidate for Governor of Wisconsin in 1968.

== Family ==
Born in Washington, D.C., he was the son of U.S. Senator Robert M. La Follette Jr. and the grandson of U.S. Senator Robert M. "Fighting Bob" La Follette, both of Wisconsin. He was named in memory of former U.S. Senator Bronson Cutting of New Mexico, a close family friend who died in an airplane crash in 1935.

== Biography ==
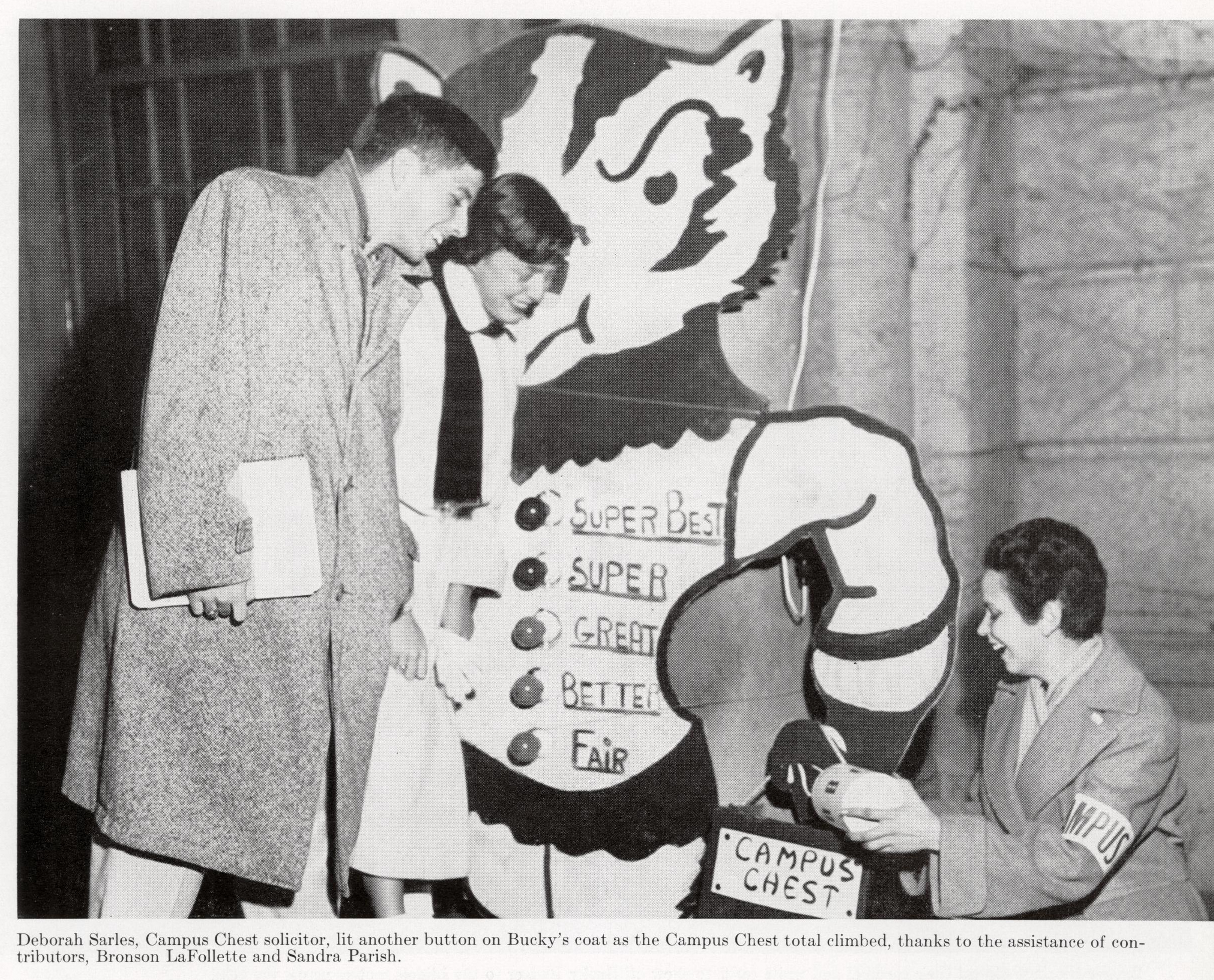
La Follette (standing, left) in the University of Wisconsin–Madison yearbook, 1956

La Follette went to Landon School in Bethesda, Maryland. He received a bachelor of arts degree in political science from the University of Wisconsin–Madison in 1958 and a University of Wisconsin Law School Juris Doctor degree in 1960. He worked in private practice until 1962, when he was appointed an Assistant U.S. Attorney for the Western District of Wisconsin by U.S. Attorney General Robert F. Kennedy.

In 1964 he was elected Wisconsin Attorney General and served for two consecutive two-year terms, and later three consecutive four-year terms from 1975 to 1987. He challenged the incumbent Republican Governor Warren P. Knowles in the 1968 Wisconsin gubernatorial election and lost. He ran for and was again elected Attorney General in 1974. Despite a 1981 conviction for drunk driving, he was re-elected in 1982, and in the process became the first candidate for Wisconsin statewide office to receive one million votes. After his 1986 defeat following an ethics investigation, he retired from public service and lived in Madison.

== Death ==
La Follette died on March 15, 2018, at the age of 82 at the University of Wisconsin Hospital, in Madison, Wisconsin.

Governor Scott Walker said in a statement: "Tonette and I send our prayers to the family of former Wisconsin Attorney General Bronson La Follette. He was a dedicated public servant for several decades."

== See also ==
- La Follette family

== Electoral history ==
=== Wisconsin Attorney General (1964, 1966) ===
Wisconsin Attorney General Election, 1964
Party	Candidate	Votes	%	±%
Primary Election
Republican	George Thompson (incumbent)	299,771	48.60%	
Democratic	Bronson C. La Follette	225,521	36.56%	
Democratic	William H. Evans	91,487	14.83%	
Total votes		'616,779'	'100.0%'	
General Election
Democratic	Bronson C. La Follette	882,318	54.32%	
Republican	George Thompson (incumbent)	741,917	45.68%	
Total votes		'1,624,235'	'100.0%'	
Democratic gain from Republican				

Wisconsin Attorney General Election, 1966
Party	Candidate	Votes	%	±%
Primary Election
Democratic	Bronson C. La Follette (incumbent)	232,176	55.45%	
Republican	Louis J. Ceci	186,499	44.55%	
Total votes		'418,675'	'100.0%'	
General Election
Democratic	Bronson C. La Follette (incumbent)	609,216	53.56%	
Republican	Louis J. Ceci	528,202	46.44%	
Total votes		'1,137,418'	'100.0%'	
Democratic hold				

=== Wisconsin Governor (1968) ===
Wisconsin Gubernatorial Election, 1968
Party	Candidate	Votes	%	±%
Primary Election
Republican	Warren P. Knowles (incumbent)	272,504	57.04%	
Democratic	Bronson C. La Follette	173,458	36.31%	
Democratic	Floyd L. Wille	31,778	6.65%	
Total votes		'477,740'	'100.0%'	
General Election
Republican	Warren P. Knowles (incumbent)	893,463	52.88%	
Democratic	Bronson C. La Follette	791100	46.82%	
Independent	Adolf Wiggert	3,225	0.19%	
Independent	Robert Wilkinson	1,813	0.11%	
Total votes		'1,689,601'	'100.0%'	
Republican hold				

=== Wisconsin Attorney General (1974-1986) ===
Wisconsin Attorney General Election, 1974
Party	Candidate	Votes	%	±%
Primary Election
Republican	Gerald Lorge	143,337	30.64%	
Democratic	Bronson C. La Follette	132,538	28.33%	
Democratic	Anthony S. Earl	106,041	22.67%	
Democratic	Thomas M. Jacobson	50,678	10.83%	
Republican	Edward Nager	35,165	7.52%	
Total votes		'467,759'	'100.0%'	
General Election
Democratic	Bronson C. La Follette	669,968	58.10%	
Republican	Gerald Lorge	483,232	41.90%	
Total votes		'1,153,200'	'100.0%'	
Democratic hold				

Wisconsin Attorney General Election, 1978
Party	Candidate	Votes	%	±%
Primary Election
Democratic	Bronson C. La Follette (incumbent)	232,057	51.96%	
Republican	William Mattka	213,651	47.84%	
Constitution	Thomas J. Bergen	903	0.20%	
Total votes		'446,611'	'100.0%'	
General Election
Democratic	Bronson C. La Follette (incumbent)	868,829	61.28%	
Republican	William Mattka	533,943	37.66%	
Constitution	Thomas J. Bergen	15,045	1.06%	
Total votes		'1,417,817'	'100.0%'	+22.95%
Democratic hold				

Wisconsin Attorney General Election, 1982
Party	Candidate	Votes	%	±%
Primary Election
Democratic	Bronson C. La Follette (incumbent)	433,513	99.24%	
Libertarian	James S. Hoffert	1,510	0.35%	
Constitution	Gene D. Lineham	1,435	0.33%	
Republican	Marcus Gumz	327	0.07%	
Republican	William Belter	28	0.01%	
Total votes		'436,813'	'100.0%'	
General Election
Democratic	Bronson C. La Follette (incumbent)	1,062,322	96.40%	
Libertarian	James S. Hoffert	27,004	2.45%	
Constitution	Gene D. Lineham	12,643	1.15%	
Total votes		'1,101,969'	'100.0%'	-22.28%
Democratic hold				

Wisconsin Attorney General Election, 1986
Party	Candidate	Votes	%	±%
Primary Election
Democratic	Bronson C. La Follette (incumbent)	217,185	48.38%	
Republican	Donald J. Hanaway	174,519	38.88%	
Republican	Bartley G. Mauch	56,200	12.52%	
Labor–Farm	Dennis L. Boyer	967	0.22%	
Total votes		'436,813'	'100.0%'	
General Election
Republican	Donald J. Hanaway	751,208	51.96%	
Democratic	Bronson C. La Follette (incumbent)	664,181	45.94%	
Labor–Farm	Dennis L. Boyer	30,455	2.11%	
Total votes		'1,101,969'	'100.0%'	+31.21%
Republican gain from Democratic				

Party political offices
Preceded by William H. Evans	Democratic nominee for Attorney General of Wisconsin; 1964, 1966	Succeeded by Richard Dickson Cudahy
Preceded by Patrick Lucey	Democratic nominee for Governor of Wisconsin; 1968	Succeeded by Patrick Lucey
Preceded by Thomas M. Jacobson	Democratic nominee for Attorney General of Wisconsin; 1974, 1978, 1982, 1986	Succeeded by Jim Doyle
Legal offices
Preceded by George Thompson	Attorney General of Wisconsin; 1965 – 1969	Succeeded by Robert W. Warren
Preceded by Victor A. Miller	Attorney General of Wisconsin; 1975 – 1987	Succeeded by Don Hanaway
