= Chris Monson =

American politician

Chris Monson was a member of the Wisconsin State Assembly, elected in 1910. Other positions he held include town clerk of Akan, Wisconsin, postmaster of Five Points, Richland County, Wisconsin and justice of the peace. He was a Republican. Monson was born in Akan on August 25, 1875.
