= Fred J. Bohri =

American businessman and politician

Fred John Bohri (August 20, 1870 – April 9, 1934) was an American businessman and politician.

Born in Fountain City, Buffalo County, Wisconsin, Bohri graduated from the Winona High School in Winona, Minnesota. He married Augusta Schuster (1871–1954) in 1897. He was a merchant and grain dealer. Bohri also involved with the First State Bank of Fountain City serving as president, vice president, and cashier. Bohri served on the Fountain City Common Council and was mayor of the city. He also served as treasurer of the Fountain City School Board and served on the Buffalo County Board of Supervisors. Bohri served in the Wisconsin State Assembly in 1905 and was active in the Republican Party. In 1934, Bohri died in a hospital in Rochester, Minnesota following surgery. He was 63 years old.
