= William H. Hemschemeyer =

American politician

William H. Hemschemeyer was a member of the Wisconsin State Assembly.

== Biography ==
Hemschemeyer was born in Stolzenau, then in Prussia. Reports have differed on the date. During the American Civil War, he enlisted with the 26th Wisconsin Volunteer Infantry Regiment of the Union Army. He would later achieve the rank of captain. Hemschemeyer died on November 18, 1894.

== Political career ==
Hemschemeyer was a member of the Assembly in 1879 and 1880. Other positions he held include alderman and city clerk of Manitowoc, Wisconsin. In 1868, he was a candidate for Sheriff of Manitowoc County, Wisconsin. He was a Republican.
