= Wilhelm Albers =

American politician (1840–1904)

Member of the Wisconsin State Assembly
- In office 1883–1883

Personal details
- Born: Wilhelm Theodor Albers; May 22, 1840 Kingdom of Bavaria
- Died: January 21, 1904 (aged 63) Sheboygan County, Wisconsin, U.S.
- Party: Democratic

Wilhelm Theodor Albers (May 22, 1840 – January 21, 1904) was a Bavarian-born American politician. He was a member of the Wisconsin State Assembly.

In 1859, he moved to St. Louis, Missouri, United States. During the American Civil War, he served with the 12th Iowa Volunteer Infantry Regiment of the Union Army, achieving the rank of captain. Albers later moved to Centerville, Manitowoc County, Wisconsin. From 1875 to 1882 he was a school principal in Hika, Wisconsin. He died on January 21, 1904, in Sheboygan County, Wisconsin.

== Political career ==
Albers was a member of the Assembly in 1883. Other positions he held include town clerk of Centerville. He was a Democrat.
