= Reinhardt Rahr =

American politician

Reinhardt Rahr (April 22, 1859 – October 18, 1921) was an American businessman and brewer.

Born in Manitowoc, Wisconsin, Rahr served an apprenticeship with a manufacturing chemist, in Chicago, Illinois, and attended classes at the Chicago College of Pharmacy graduating in 1877. He then graduated from University of Michigan in 1881. Rahr was in the beer and malt business in Manitowoc, Wisconsin and was also involved with the banking business. Rahr served on the Manitowoc Common Council. In 1886, he was elected mayor of Manitowoc. In 1887, Rahr was elected to the Wisconsin State Assembly and was a Democrat. Rahr died of a heart ailment at his home in Manitowoc, Wisconsin.
