= Waubeek, Wisconsin =

- Town
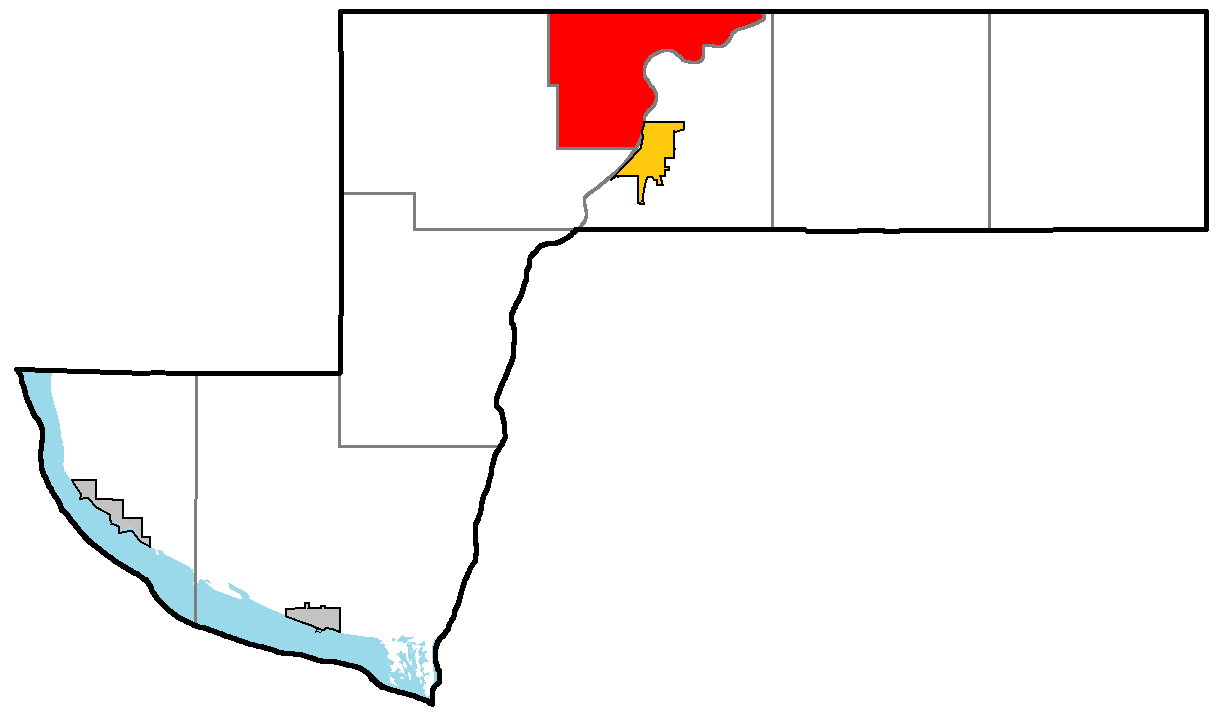
- Location of Waubeek, Pepin County

- Location of Pepin County, Wisconsin
- Coordinates: 44°39′8″N 91°59′3″W
- Country: United States
- State: Wisconsin
- County: Pepin

Area
  - Total: 12.8 sq mi (33.2 km^{2})
  - Land: 12.0 sq mi (31.1 km^{2})
  - Water: 0.81 sq mi (2.1 km^{2})
- Elevation: 801 ft (244 m)

Population (2020)
  - Total: 423
  - Density: 35.2/sq mi (13.6/km^{2})
- Time zone: UTC-6 (Central (CST))
  - Summer (DST): UTC-5 (CDT)
- Area codes: 715 & 534
- FIPS code: 55-84100
- GNIS feature ID: 1584369
- Website: https://townofwaubeek.wi.gov/

Waubeek (/ˈwɔːbiːk/ WAW-beek) is a town in Pepin County, Wisconsin, United States. The population was 423 at the 2020 census.

== Geography ==
According to the United States Census Bureau, the town has a total area of 12.8 square miles (33.2 km^{2}), of which, 12.0 square miles (31.1 km^{2}) of it is land and 0.8 square miles (2.1 km^{2}) of it (6.39%) is water.

== Demographics ==
As of the census of 2000, there were 364 people, 129 households, and 103 families residing in the town. The population density was 30.3 people per square mile (11.7/km^{2}). There were 130 housing units at an average density of 10.8 per square mile (4.2/km^{2}). The racial makeup of the town was 99.18% White and 0.82% Asian. Hispanic or Latino of any race were 0.27% of the population.

There were 129 households, out of which 38.8% had children under the age of 18 living with them, 75.2% were married couples living together, 3.9% had a female householder with no husband present, and 19.4% were non-families. 14.7% of all households were made up of individuals, and 6.2% had someone living alone who was 65 years of age or older. The average household size was 2.82 and the average family size was 3.17.

In the town, the population was spread out, with 28.8% under the age of 18, 6.0% from 18 to 24, 28.3% from 25 to 44, 29.1% from 45 to 64, and 7.7% who were 65 years of age or older. The median age was 38 years. For every 100 females, there were 123.3 males. For every 100 females age 18 and over, there were 110.6 males.

The median income for a household in the town was $49,125, and the median income for a family was $55,781. Males had a median income of $29,750 versus $21,563 for females. The per capita income for the town was $24,352. None of the families and 2.2% of the population were living below the poverty line, including no under eighteens and 17.2% of those over 64.

== Notable people ==
- C. A. Ingram, member of Wisconsin State Assembly
