= Henry Holle =

American politician

Henry Holle was a member of the Wisconsin State Assembly.

== Biography ==
Holle was born on October 12, 1859, in Milwaukee, Wisconsin. In 1890, he became a deputy sheriff of Milwaukee County, Wisconsin. He became Undersheriff in 1892.

== Assembly career ==
Holle was elected to the Assembly in 1904. He was a Republican.
