= George B. Skogmo =

American politician

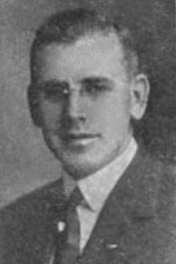

Member of the Wisconsin State Senate
- In office 1912–1924
- Constituency: 10th District

Personal details
- Born: August 1880 Whalan, Minnesota, US
- Died: August 31, 1968 (aged 88) Oconomowoc, Wisconsin, US
- Party: Republican

George B. Skogmo (1880–1968) was a member of the Wisconsin State Senate.

== Biography ==
Skogmo was born in Whalan, Minnesota in August 1880; sources have differed on the exact date. In 1902, he graduated from River Falls High School in River Falls, Wisconsin. He died in Oconomowoc, Wisconsin on August 31, 1968.

== Career ==
Skogmo was elected to the Senate from the 10th District in 1912, 1916 and 1920. Additionally, he was City Treasurer of River Falls from 1910 to 1912. He was a Republican.
