= Sherman E. Smalley =

American politician

Sherman E. Smalley (June 25, 1866 – August 21, 1958) was an American jurist and lawyer.

Born in Marengo, Illinois, Smalley went to school in Grant County, Wisconsin and to a law school in Detroit, Michigan. He then practiced law in Cuba City, Wisconsin. Smalley served as town clerk and on the Cuba City Village Board. In 1903 and 1905, Smalley served in the Wisconsin State Assembly and was a Republican. Smalley then served as Wisconsin Circuit Court judge for Grant County, Wisconsin from 1921 until his retirement in 1943. He was charged with and acquitted of corruption in 1921. Smalley died in Cuba City, Wisconsin.
