= Christoph Paulus =

American politician

Christoph Paulus (April 17, 1852 – April 9, 1915) was a member of the Wisconsin State Assembly during the 1895 and 1915 sessions. He was a Republican. In between, he was Postmaster of the Wisconsin State Senate from 1897 to 1907. Paulus was born on April 17, 1852, in Milwaukee, Wisconsin.
