= James L. O'Connor =

American politician (1859–1931)

15th Attorney General of Wisconsin
- In office January 5, 1891 – January 7, 1895
- Governor: George Wilbur Peck
- Preceded by: Charles E. Estabrook
- Succeeded by: William H. Mylrea

District Attorney of Dane County, Wisconsin
- In office January 5, 1885 – January 7, 1889
- Preceded by: Robert M. La Follette
- Succeeded by: John L. Erdall

Personal details
- Born: June 3, 1859 Hartford, Wisconsin, U.S.
- Died: August 19, 1931 Milwaukee, Wisconsin, U.S.
- Resting place: Holy Cross Cemetery, Milwaukee
- Party: Democratic
- Spouse: Annie Lincoln Wood (m. 1889–1931)
- Children: Arthur J. O'Connor^{(b. 1891; died 1967)}; Clarence W. O'Connor^{(b. 1895; died 1970)}; Jerome O'Connor
- Education: University of Wisconsin Law School
- Profession: lawyer

James L. O'Connor (June 3, 1859 – August 19, 1931) was an American lawyer and Democratic politician. He was the 15th Attorney General of Wisconsin (1891–1895).

He was born in Hartford, Wisconsin and graduated from University of Wisconsin Law School. O'Connor served as city attorney for Madison, Wisconsin, and then district attorney of Dane County, Wisconsin. After serving as Wisconsin Attorney General, O'Connor moved to Milwaukee, Wisconsin, where he continued to practice law.

== Electoral history ==
Wisconsin Attorney General Election, 1890
Party	Candidate	Votes	%	±%
General Election, November 4, 1890
Democratic	James L. O'Connor	159,716	52.44%	+8.75%
Republican	James O'Neill	126,310	41.47%	−8.26%
Prohibition	Byron E. Van Kuren	11,282	3.70%	−0.41%
Labor	Michael Shiel	7,108	2.33%	−0.12%
	Scattering	147	0.05%	
Plurality		33,406	10.97%	+4.93%
Total votes		304,563	100.0%	-14.11%
Democratic gain from Republican				

Wisconsin Attorney General Election, 1892
Party	Candidate	Votes	%	±%
General Election, November 8, 1892
Democratic	James L. O'Connor (incumbent)	177,147	47.95%	−4.49%
Republican	James O'Neill	169,444	45.86%	+4.39%
Prohibition	F. A. Watkins	13,196	3.57%	−0.13%
Populist	M. W. Stevens	9,675	2.62%	
Plurality		7,703	2.08%	-8.88%
Total votes		369,462	100.0%	+21.31%
Democratic hold				

Wisconsin Attorney General Election, 1894
Party	Candidate	Votes	%	±%
General Election, November 6, 1894
Republican	William H. Mylrea	197,709	53.31%	+7.45%
Democratic	James L. O'Connor (incumbent)	137,483	37.07%	−10.87%
Populist	Carl Runge	24,445	6.59%	+3.97%
Prohibition	Charles W. Lomas	11,214	3.02%	−0.55%
Plurality		60,226	16.24%	+14.16%
Total votes		370,851	100.0%	+0.38%
Republican gain from Democratic				

Party political offices
Preceded by Timothy E. Ryan	Democratic nominee for Attorney General of Wisconsin; 1890, 1892, 1894	Succeeded by Henry I. Weed
Legal offices
Preceded by Charles E. Estabrook	Attorney General of Wisconsin; January 5, 1891 – January 7, 1895	Succeeded by William H. Mylrea
