= List of Wisconsin attorneys general =

Chief law officer of the state of Wisconsin

Attorney General of Wisconsin
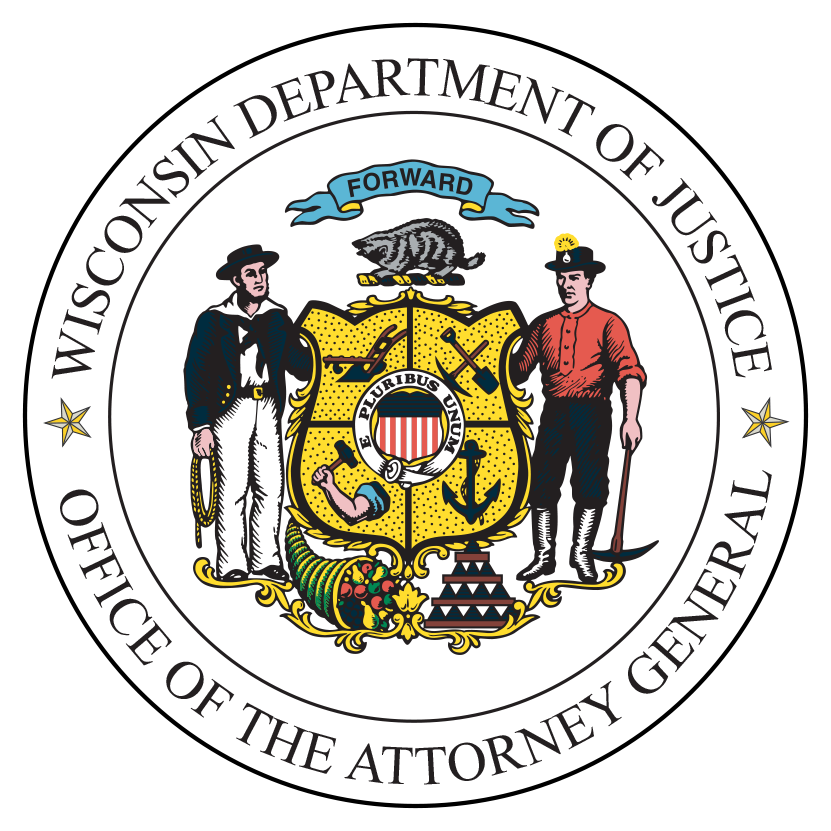
- Seal of the attorney general of Wisconsin

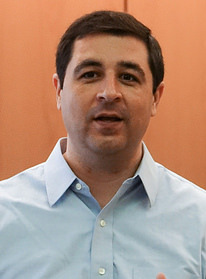
- Incumbent; Josh Kaul since January 7, 2019
- Wisconsin Department of Justice
- Style: Mr. or Madam Attorney General (informal); The Honorable (formal)
- Seat: Wisconsin State Capitol; Madison, Wisconsin
- Appointer: General election
- Term length: Four years, no term limits
- Constituting instrument: Constitution of Wisconsin, Article VI
- Inaugural holder: James S. Brown
- Formation: June 7, 1848 (178 years ago)
- Salary: US$148,000
- Website: www.doj.state.wi.us

The attorney general of Wisconsin is a constitutional officer of the U.S. state of Wisconsin, the chief law enforcement officer of Wisconsin, and the head of the Wisconsin Department of Justice. It is part of Wisconsin's administrative branch as defined in Article VI of the Constitution of Wisconsin. The attorney general is elected to four-year terms by statewide partisan election in non-presidential election years. If a vacancy occurs, the governor of Wisconsin is empowered to appoint a replacement to serve the remainder of the unexpired term; there are no term limits for this office.

Forty-five individuals have held the office of attorney general since Wisconsin achieved statehood in 1848. The incumbent is Josh Kaul, a Democrat; he was elected in 2018 and re-elected in 2022.

== Election and term of office ==
The attorney general is elected in a partisan general election held on Election Day in November of even-numbered non-presidential election years, for a four-year term which starts on the first Monday of the January following the election. There is no limit to the number of terms an attorney general may serve. From 1848 to 1968, the attorney general was elected to a two-year term in the November general election. Since 1970, following ratification of a constitutional amendment in April 1967, the attorney general has been elected to a four-year term.

In the event of a vacancy in the office of the attorney general, the governor of Wisconsin may appoint a replacement to fill the remainder of the term. The attorney general may be removed from office through an impeachment trial or by recall election. They may also choose to resign from office. In Wisconsin's history, six attorneys general have resigned, none have ever been recalled or impeached.

== Powers and duties ==
The powers of the attorney general are largely defined in chapters 15 and 165 of the Wisconsin State Statutes. Section 15.25 establishes the Wisconsin Department of Justice and assigns the attorney general as the head of that department. Section 165.015 defines the primary powers and duties of the attorney general, but other powers and duties of the attorney general can be found throughout chapter 165. By law, the attorney general is the chief law officer of the state of Wisconsin. Amongst other duties, the attorney general has charge and conduct for the state of all suits instituted for and against the government of Wisconsin, certifies all bonds issued by the state, protects the School Trust Funds managed by the Wisconsin Board of Commissioners of Public Lands, and provides written opinions on questions of law to either house of the Wisconsin Legislature or the head of any state agency.

In accordance with Article X, Section 7, of the Wisconsin Constitution, the attorney general is also a member of the Wisconsin Board of Commissioners of Public Lands; the same is also a member of, or designates members to, the Claims Board, Crime Victims Rights Board, Group Insurance Board, Joint Survey Committee on Tax Exemptions, Judicial Council, Law Enforcement Standards Board, Public Records Board, and the Board of Directors of the state Insurance Security Fund.

== List of attorneys general of Wisconsin ==
This is a list of attorneys general for Wisconsin, from before statehood to present.

Number of attorneys general of Wisconsin by party affiliation
Party	Attorneys
Republican	28
Democratic	16
Progressive	1

=== Wisconsin Territory ===
Before statehood, the Wisconsin Territory also had several attorneys general appointed by the governor of the territory.

Image	Name	Took office	Left office	Territorial governor
	Henry S. Baird	1836	1839	Henry Dodge
	Horatio N. Wells	1839	1841	Henry Dodge
	Mortimer M. Jackson	1842	1844	James Doty
	William Pitt Lynde	1844	1845	Nathaniel P. Tallmadge
	Mortimer M. Jackson	1845	1846	Henry Dodge
	A. Hyatt Smith	1846	1848	Henry Dodge

=== State of Wisconsin ===
Democratic Republican Progressive

#	Image	Name	Party	Took office	Left office
1		James S. Brown (1824–1878)	Democratic	June 7, 1848	January 7, 1850
2		S. Park Coon (1820–1883)	Democratic	January 7, 1850	January 5, 1852
3		Experience Estabrook (1813–1894)	Democratic	January 5, 1852	January 2, 1854
4		George Baldwin Smith (1823–1879)	Democratic	January 2, 1854	January 7, 1856
5		William Rudolph Smith (1787–1868)	Democratic	January 7, 1856	January 4, 1858
6		Gabriel Bouck (1828–1904)	Democratic	January 4, 1858	January 2, 1860
7		James Henry Howe (Note: Resigned from office.) (1827–1893)	Republican	January 2, 1860	October 7, 1862
8		Winfield Smith (Note: Appointed to fill unexpired term.) (1827–1899)	Republican	October 7, 1862	January 1, 1866
9		Charles R. Gill (1830–1883)	Republican	January 1, 1866	January 3, 1870
10		Stephen Steele Barlow (1818–1900)	Republican	January 3, 1870	January 5, 1874
11		A. Scott Sloan (1820–1895)	Liberal Republican	January 5, 1874	January 7, 1878
12		Alexander Wilson (1833–1888)	Republican	January 7, 1878	January 2, 1882
13		Leander F. Frisby (Note: Some sources record Leander Frisby's surname as "Frisbie".) (1825–1889)	Republican	January 2, 1882	January 3, 1887
14		Charles E. Estabrook (1847–1918)	Republican	January 3, 1887	January 5, 1891
15		James L. O'Connor (1858–1931)	Democratic	January 5, 1891	January 7, 1895
16		William H. Mylrea (1853–1916)	Republican	January 7, 1895	January 2, 1899
17		Emmett R. Hicks (1854–1925)	Republican	January 2, 1899	January 5, 1903
18		Lafayette M. Sturdevant (1856–1923)	Republican	January 5, 1903	January 7, 1907
19		Frank L. Gilbert (1864–1930)	Republican	January 7, 1907	January 2, 1911
20		Levi H. Bancroft (1861–1948)	Republican	January 2, 1911	January 6, 1913
21		Walter C. Owen (1868–1934)	Republican	January 6, 1913	January 7, 1918
22		Spencer Haven (1868–1938)	Republican	January 7, 1918	January 6, 1919
23		John J. Blaine (1875–1934)	Republican	January 6, 1919	January 3, 1921
24		William J. Morgan (1883–1983)	Republican	January 3, 1921	January 1, 1923
25		Herman L. Ekern (1872–1954)	Republican	January 1, 1923	January 3, 1927
26		John W. Reynolds Sr. (1876–1958)	Republican	January 3, 1927	January 2, 1933
27		James E. Finnegan (1892–1966)	Democratic	January 2, 1933	January 4, 1937
28		Orland Steen Loomis (1893–1942)	Progressive	January 4, 1937	January 2, 1939
29		John E. Martin (1891–1968)	Republican	January 2, 1939	June 1, 1948
vacant				June 1, 1948	June 5, 1948
30		Grover L. Broadfoot (1892-1962)	Republican	June 5, 1948	November 12, 1948
31		Thomas E. Fairchild (1912–2007)	Democratic	November 12, 1948	January 1, 1951
32		Vernon W. Thomson (1905–1988)	Republican	January 1, 1951	January 7, 1957
33		Stewart G. Honeck (1906–1999)	Republican	January 7, 1957	January 5, 1959
34		John W. Reynolds Jr. (1921–2002)	Democratic	January 5, 1959	January 7, 1963
35		George Thompson (1918–1992)	Republican	January 7, 1963	January 4, 1965
36		Bronson La Follette (1936–2018)	Democratic	January 4, 1965	January 6, 1969
37		Robert W. Warren (1925–1998)	Republican	January 6, 1969	October 8, 1974
38		Victor A. Miller (1916–1984)	Democratic	October 8, 1974	November 25, 1974
39		Bronson La Follette (1936–2018)	Democratic	November 25, 1974	January 5, 1987
40		Don Hanaway (1933–1995)	Republican	January 5, 1987	January 7, 1991
41		Jim Doyle (born 1945)	Democratic	January 7, 1991	January 6, 2003
42		Peggy Lautenschlager (1955–2018)	Democratic	January 6, 2003	January 3, 2007
43		J.B. Van Hollen (born 1966)	Republican	January 3, 2007	January 5, 2015
44		Brad Schimel (born 1965)	Republican	January 5, 2015	January 7, 2019
45		Josh Kaul (born 1981)	Democratic	January 7, 2019	Incumbent

== See also ==
- Wisconsin Board of Commissioners of Public Lands
