= 1896 Wisconsin Supreme Court special election =

1897 Wisconsin Supreme Court election
- April 7, 1896
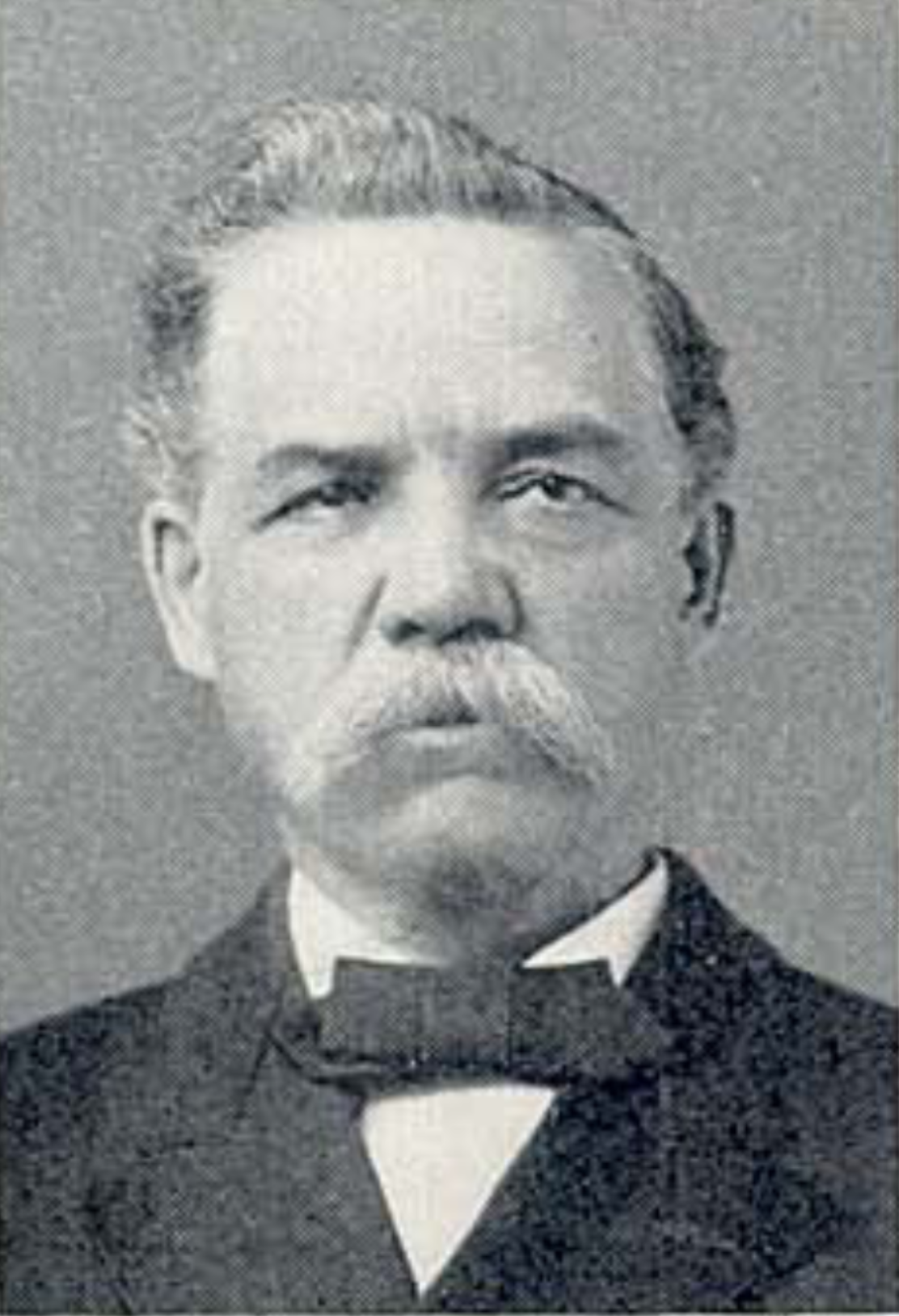
Candidate	Roujet D. Marshall
Popular vote	161,208
Percentage	99.74%
Justice before election
Roujet D. Marshall
Elected Justice
Roujet D. Marshall

The 1897 Wisconsin Supreme Court election was held on Tuesday, April 7, 1896, to elect a justice to the Wisconsin Supreme Court for a ten-year term. Incumbent justice Roujet D. Marshall (who had been appointed the previous year to fill a vacancy) was re-elected, unopposed.

== Background ==
Marshall had held his seat since 1895, when Governor William Upham appointed him to fill a vacancy on the court.

== Result ==
1897 Wisconsin Supreme Court election
Party	Candidate	Votes	%
General election (April 7, 1897)
Nonpartisan	Roujet D. Marshall (incumbent)	161,208	99.74
write-ins	scattering	411	0.25
Total votes		161,619	100
Blank ballots		2,813	–
defective ballots	–	177	–
