= Roujet D. Marshall =

American judge (1847–1922)

The Honorable Roujet D. Marshall
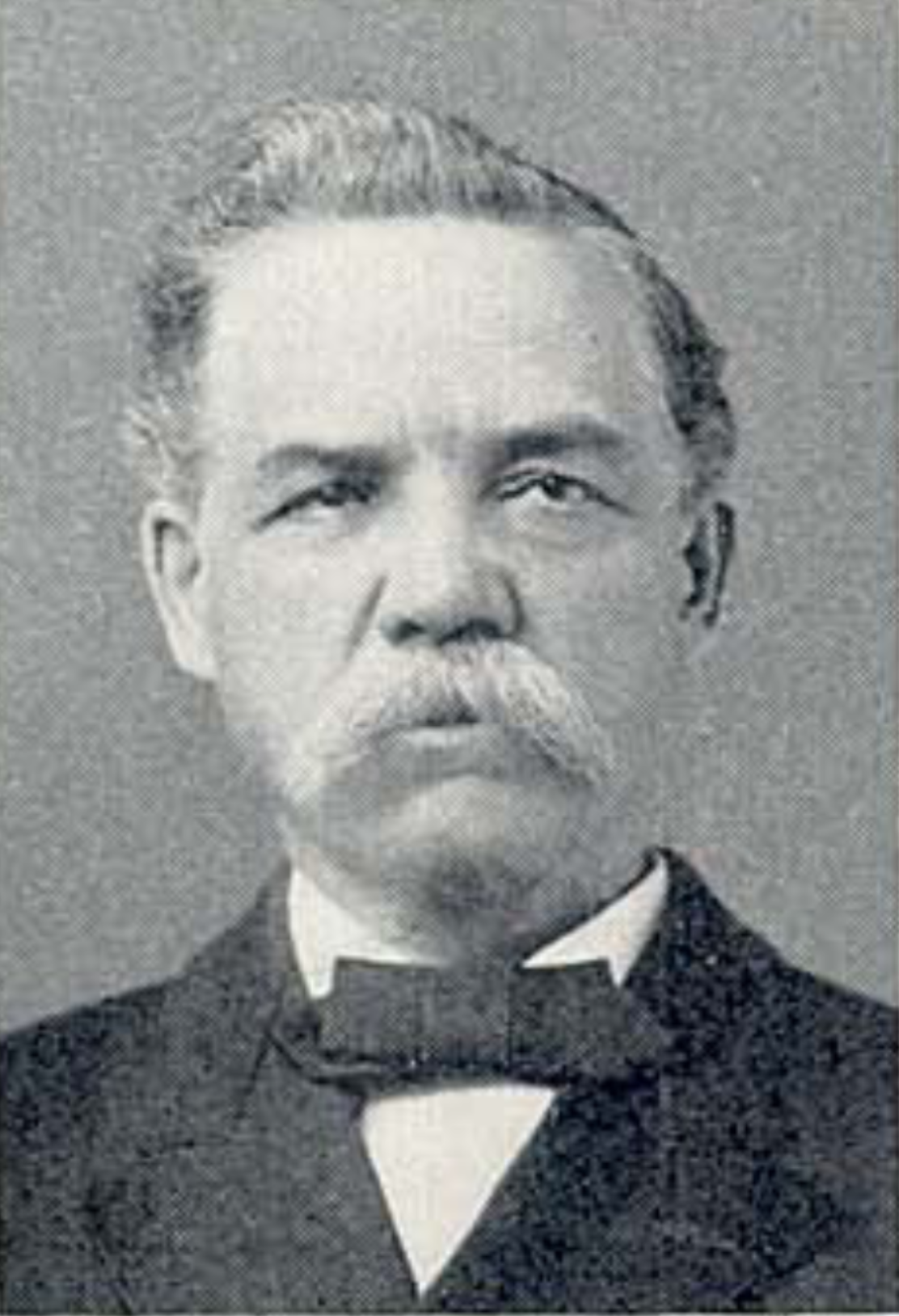

Justice of the Wisconsin Supreme Court
- In office August 5, 1895 – January 7, 1918
- Appointed by: William H. Upham
- Preceded by: Harlow S. Orton
- Succeeded by: Walter C. Owen

Wisconsin Circuit Court Judge for the 11th circuit
- In office January 1, 1889 – August 5, 1895
- Preceded by: Solon H. Clough
- Succeeded by: Aad J. Vinje

Personal details
- Born: December 27, 1847 Nashua, New Hampshire, U.S.
- Died: May 22, 1922 (aged 74)
- Resting place: Forest Hill Cemetery, Madison, Wisconsin
- Spouse: Mary E. Jenkins

Roujet DeLisle Marshall (December 27, 1847 – May 22, 1922) was an American lawyer and judge. He served 22 years as a justice of the Wisconsin Supreme Court (1895–1918).

He was named after the writer of the French national anthem, La Marseillaise, Claude Joseph Rouget de Lisle.

== Early life ==
Born in Nashua, New Hampshire, in 1847 to farming parents, Marshall's family moved to Wisconsin in 1854 when he was 7. In the early 1860s however, his father was disabled, and Marshall had to take on most of the work on the farm while continuing his schooling and eventually attending college.

After reading a biography of Constitutional lawyer William Wirt, he was inspired to go into law.

Marshall was admitted to the bar in 1871, and worked with a lawyer in Sauk County, N.W. Wheeler. Wheeler soon moved to Chippewa Falls and Marshall joined him. Northern Wisconsin was then part of a vast white pine forest stretching across northern North America; Wisconsin’s portion of the forest was systematically logged out from about 1830 to 1910. In the 1870s the lumber industry was at its peak and Chippewa Falls was one of the centers of logging activity in the state, along with Eau Claire and Oshkosh.

The town and its lawyers followed a casual, frontier-oriented culture; but Marshall, who believed devoutly in order and hard work, followed a different path. “The members of the bar, as a rule,” he said, “were a lot of good fellows who readily turned aside from the business of their profession at most any time during business hours to enjoy a social game of cards with more or less drinks by the side, I was regarded as a drudge and not in any sense a mixer.”

== Frederick Weyerhaeuser and the Chippewa Pool ==
In 1876 Frederick Weyerhaeuser, an Illinois-based lumber baron who had substantial holdings in northwest Wisconsin, hired Marshall to handle his legal business in the region. Groups of lumbermen based in Eau Claire and Chippewa Falls were then competing for control of the region’s timber. Throughout the 1870s they battled each other for control of the region’s rivers and for preferential treatment from the legislature. In the late 1870s Weyerhaeuser expanded his holdings and gained control of the Chippewa Falls group. In early 1880, a time when American businesses were consolidating and trying to achieve monopoly control in many different fields, the Eau Claire group approached Weyerhaeuser about a cooperative arrangement. At Weyerhaeuser’s request Marshall prepared a charter for a cartel, known as the Chippewa Pool, under which both groups would share their facilities in order to gather logs and ship them downriver to Midwestern lumber markets. Weyerhaeuser would manage the cartel, and each group would receive an agreed-upon percentage of the cartel's profits.

The cartel dominated the northwest Wisconsin market for the remainder of the lumber era. Marshall's role in forming it, and his association with Weyerhaeuser brought him legal and political prominence and made him a wealthy man. Marshall, a self-made man, firmly believed that anyone could succeed through hard work and temperate habits. He achieved his success in an era that believed in minimizing constraints on entrepreneurialism and exploitation of natural resources, and he defended those beliefs throughout his life.

== Judicial Service ==
In 1888 Marshall was elected circuit judge for an area comprising the northwest corner of Wisconsin, and he soon gained a reputation as a hardworking, no-nonsense judge. “Decisive, uncompromising, domineering, his arrogance is born of the impatience of strength and not that of weakness,” said one observer; “[h]is capacity for work appears to be unlimited.” Marshall soon expressed interest in advancing to Wisconsin's Supreme Court. After passing up two opportunities because he believed the prevailing political conditions were not right, he secured nearly unanimous support from the state’s bar for a vacancy that occurred in 1895 and Governor William Upham appointed him to the Court, albeit with some reluctance.

== Marshall and Progressive Reforms ==
Marshall served on Wisconsin’s Supreme Court throughout the Progressive era. During that era many state courts struck down reform laws sponsored by the Progressives, using the substantive due process doctrine. Under the doctrine, courts gave little deference to legislative policy decisions: they protected individual liberty and property rights and individuals’ rights to contract freely against governmental interference and interpreted government’s power to promote the public welfare narrowly. Between 1897 and 1908, Marshall and his colleagues struck down several reform laws including a Beloit school board ordinance requiring all students to be vaccinated for smallpox; a state law prohibiting “yellow dog” contracts (which required workers to agree not to join a union as a condition of employment) and a state law to improve tenement housing in Milwaukee.

Marshall was not hostile to all Progressive reforms. He strongly supported the movement for workers compensation laws that arose at the end of the nineteenth century, even though such laws would make employers absolutely liable for workers’ injuries. Marshall believed that the existing system of allowing workers to sue their employers in court, with the chance of a large award or no award at all, was inefficient. Workers compensation would provide more predictability and security for both sides: workers would be guaranteed recovery but their benefits would be limited and fixed in a statutory schedule. “Why should not the sacrifices of all be taken at once as the burdens of all,” he asked, “not scattering by the way human wrecks to float as derelicts for a time, increasing the [social] cost?” Marshall actively promoted the workers compensation movement in Wisconsin and helped draft the state’s compensation statute, which was enacted in 1911.

== Constitutional Debate with Chief Justice Winslow ==
During the late Progressive era Marshall and John Winslow, the Court's chief justice, engaged in a continuing debate over the proper interpretation of the federal and state constitutions in light of changing social needs. Marshall argued that "preservation of liberty is given precedent [even] over the establishment of government" and that courts must ensure that reform laws did not infringe it. A reform law, he said, cannot "be conclusively legitimate merely because it promotes, however trifling in degree, public health, comfort, or convenience." Winslow and Marshall continued their debate in a series of cases in which Winslow's philosophy ultimately prevailed:

- Kiley (1909). In Kiley v. Chicago, Milwaukee, St. Paul & Pacific Railroad Co. (1909) a majority of the Court, including Winslow, upheld a 1907 law providing liberalized rules of recovery for railroad workers. Marshall, who dissented, believed the law was too broad because it applied to all workers, not just train operators and line workers who assumed physical risks that office workers did not. He also complained that his colleagues "evince[d] want of comprehension of our system of government ... [and] the broad scope of these constitutional limitations" on restriction of individual and corporate liberty and property rights.
- In Borgnis v. Falk Co. (1911), the Supreme Court upheld Wisconsin's new workers compensation law over objections that it violated employers' liberty and property rights by forcing them to pay benefits even where they were not at fault. Winslow argued that constitutions must be interpreted flexibly in order to meet changing social conditions: "When an eighteenth century constitution forms the charter of liberty of a twentieth century government," he asked, "must its general provisions be construed and interpreted by an eighteenth century mind in the light of eighteenth century conditions and ideals? Clearly not. This were to command the race to halt in its progress, to stretch the state upon a veritable bed of Procrustes." Marshall agreed that the workers compensation law was constitutional but he disagreed with Winslow's philosophy. If the constitution is to efficiently endure, the idea that it is capable of being re-squared, from time to time, to fit new legislative or judicial notions of necessities," he said, "... must be combated whenever and wherever advanced."
- In the Forestry Case (1915), the court struck down a law that authorized the state to spend money to acquire land in northern Wisconsin, once the site of a huge white-pine forest that had been cut down by loggers during the nineteenth century, and turn it back into forest. Marshall held that the law violated a clause in Wisconsin's constitution that prohibited state financing of "works of internal improvement," and he argued that the law impermissibly interfered with private property and liberty rights. Winslow believed the law was invalid because of technical defects but he disagreed with Marshall that reforestation was an "internal improvement," and affirmed that land conservation was a matter of public welfare that the state could undertake.
- In 1911 Wisconsin Progressives enacted a law creating an Industrial Commission and giving it comprehensive power to regulate workplace conditions affecting safety. The law was the first in the nation to create an agency with such broad powers. In State v. Lange Canning Co. (1916), Marshall and all of his colleagues except Winslow initially voted to strike down a portion of the law directing the agency to establish maximum working hours for women; they reasoned that the legislature had impermissibly delegated its policymaking powers to unelected agency officials. Winslow dissented, and when the state asked for a rehearing he was able to persuade his colleagues, including Marshall, to change their minds. The Court now upheld the law, agreeing with Winslow that the legislature had set policy by requiring that workplaces be safe, and that when the Commission set women's working hours it was merely making a determination of fact as to what hours best promoted safety.

Marshall was defeated for reelection in 1917 largely because his decision in the forestry case was unpopular. By the time Winslow died in 1920, his philosophy of flexible constitutionalism and adaptation to modern conditions was generally accepted in Wisconsin. Several years later Walter Owen, the justice who replaced Marshall, stated for the Supreme Court that "It is thoroughly established in this country that the rights preserved to the individual by ... constitutional provisions are held in subordination to the rights of society."

Legal offices
Preceded by Solon H. Clough	Wisconsin Circuit Court Judge for the 11th circuit January 1, 1889 – August 5, 1895	Succeeded by Aad J. Vinje
Preceded by Harlow S. Orton	Justice of the Wisconsin Supreme Court; August 5, 1895 – January 7, 1918	Succeeded by Walter C. Owen
