= Senator Risser =

Senator Risser may refer to:

- Fred Risser (Progressive politician) (1900–1971), Wisconsin State Senate
- Fred Risser (born 1927), Wisconsin State Senate
