= Milwaukee Public Library =

Public library system in Milwaukee, Wisconsin, U.S.

- Location: 814 W. Wisconsin Ave., Milwaukee, Wisconsin, U.S.
- Established: 1878
- Branches: 14

Collection
- Size: 2,587,412 (2011)

Access and use
- Population served: 594,833

Other information
- Director: Joan Johnson
- Website: www.mpl.org

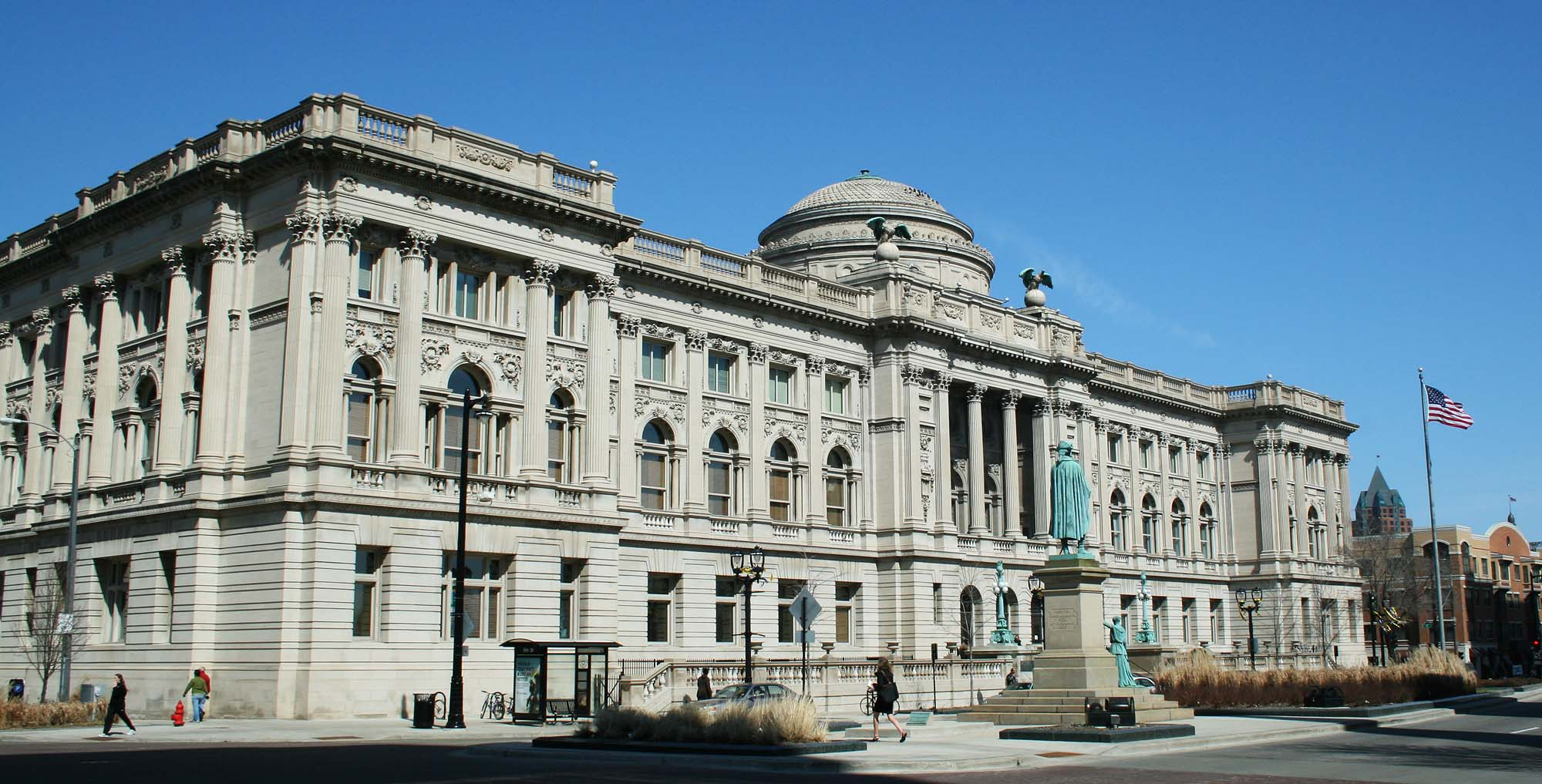
Milwaukee Central Library

Milwaukee Public Library (MPL) is the public library system in Milwaukee, Wisconsin, United States, consisting of a central library and 13 branches, all part of the Milwaukee County Federated Library System. MPL is the largest public library system in Wisconsin.

== History ==
The Milwaukee Public Library can trace its lineage back to 1847 when the Young Men's Association started a subscription library that collected dues from its members. The group rented space for its library in a number of locations over the years and expanded into sponsoring a lecture series with such important speakers as Horace Mann, Horace Greeley and Ralph Waldo Emerson.

In 1878, the city-sponsored library began when the state legislature authorized Milwaukee to establish a public library. At that time, it took over the association's rented quarters and the group's collection of 10,000 volumes, many in German.

On October 3, 1898, after several moves and several fires, the library moved into a new, block-long limestone building at what is now 814 W. Wisconsin Avenue. The building was shared with the Milwaukee Public Museum until the museum moved to its own building on West Wells Street in the mid-1960s.

The library system expanded by establishing book depositories at locations around the city, first in grocery stores, then in rented store buildings. On June 16, 1910, the South Division branch opened in its own building at what is now 931 W. Madison Street.

In 1929, when it still shared the space with the museum, the Library was home to a lion named Simba, who lived in the taxidermy department on the fourth floor. Simba "The Library Lion" was also known to play on the roof.

In 1957, an addition to the Central Library building was opened on the Wells Street side. It included four fireproof levels of shelving below ground level.

In the 1960s, the library system began a program to replace the storefront libraries and the outdated South Division branch and build new branch buildings throughout the city. Today, there are 12 neighborhood libraries, each of which serves a population of about 50,000.

On July 29, 2020, the Good Hope Library opened; it is the most recently built branch library. The Good Hope branch replaced the Mill Road branch, which closed permanently in March 2020. Other recent branch library renovations or replacements include East Library, which re-opened in a new building to the public on November 22, 2014; the Tippecanoe neighborhood branch, which was renovated in 2015; and the Mitchell Street branch, which opened on October 7, 2017, in the historic Hills Building on the city's near-south side. The Mitchell Street branch replaced the Forest Home branch, which closed permanently in 2017.

== Central Library ==
The Central Library is the headquarters for the Milwaukee Public Library System. Designated a Milwaukee Landmark in 1969, the building remains one of Milwaukee's most monumental public structures.

Today, the Central Library occupies almost the entire building with 3 exceptions: the headquarters for the Milwaukee County Federated Library System; the Wisconsin Talking Book and Braille Library; and Audio & Braille Literacy Enhancement.

== Branches ==
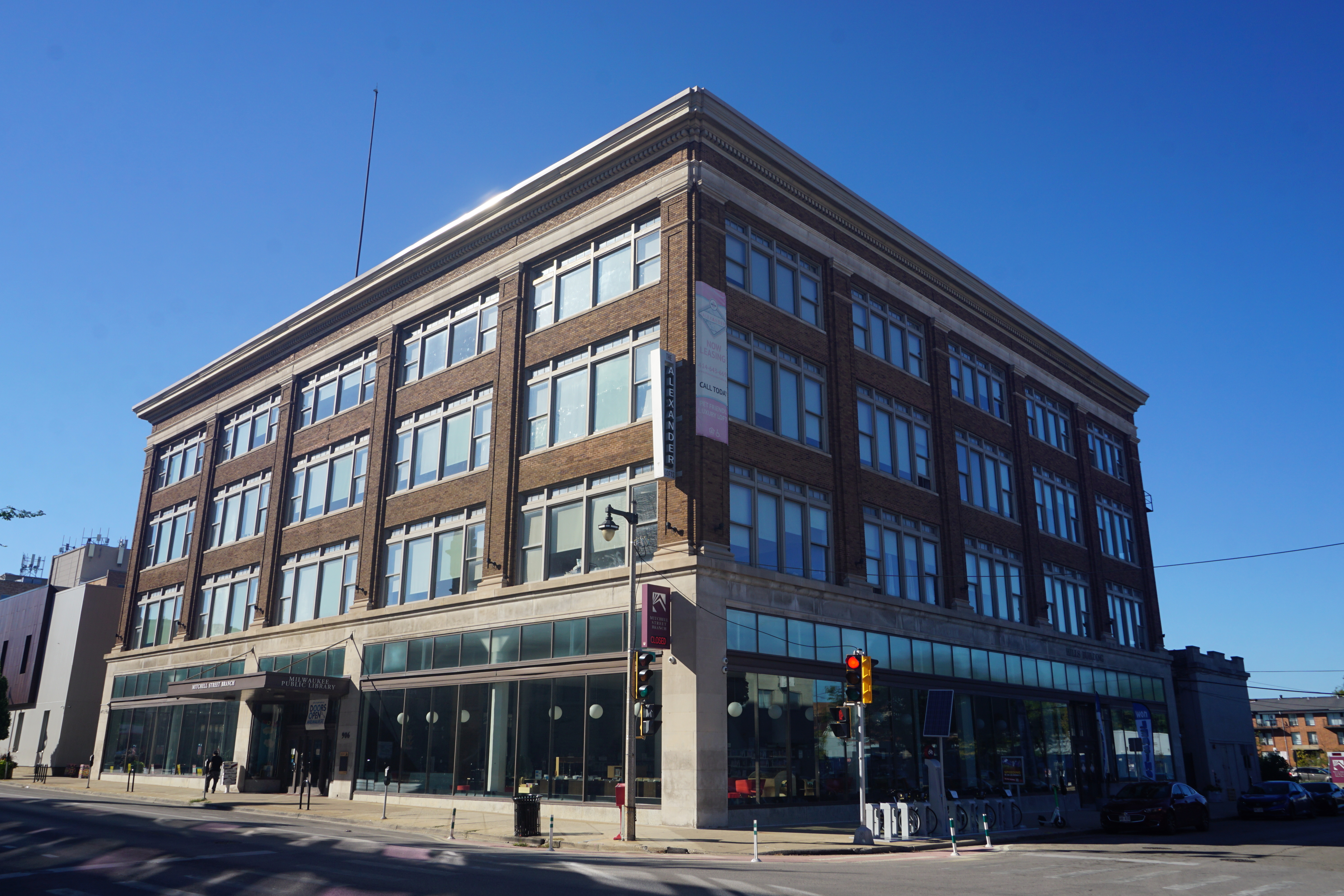
Mitchell Street Branch

- Atkinson
- Bay View
- Capitol
- Center Street
- East
- Good Hope
- Martin Luther King
- Mitchell Street
- MPL Express at Silver Spring
- Tippecanoe
- Villard Square Library
- Washington Park
- Zablocki

== Directors ==
- 1878–1880: Henry Baetz
- 1880–1892: Klas A. Linderfelt
- 1892–1896: Theresa West Elmendorf
- 1896–1911: George W. Peckham
- 1911–1920: Charles E. Mclenegan
- 1920–1941: Matthew S. Dudgeon
- 1941–1975: Richard Krug
- 1975–1983: Henry Bates
- 1983–1991: Donald Sager
- 1991–2006: Kathleen Huston
- 2006–2020: Paula Kiely
- since 2020: Joan Johnson
