= Edward Nager =

American politician (1927–2021)

Edward Nager (July 22, 1927 - March 18, 2021) was an American lawyer and politician who served six terms as a Democratic member of the Wisconsin State Assembly from Madison, Wisconsin.

== Background ==
Nager was born in New York City on July 22, 1927. He graduated from that city's Bronx High School of Science, served in the Army Air Force from 1945 to 1947, then earned a B.S. in government from the City College of New York in 1950. He earned his LL.B. at the University of Wisconsin Law School in Madison in 1955 and went to work as an attorney. He worked as an Assistant Dane County district attorney from 1960 to 1962.

== Public service ==
Nager was elected to the Assembly in 1962, succeeding fellow Democrat Fred Risser, who was (successfully) seeking a seat in the State Senate. He was re-elected from 1964 to 1972 and served as a member of the Madison city planning commission from 1965 to 1968.

He did not run for re-election in 1974 (he was succeeded by fellow Democrat David Clarenbach), choosing instead to run for Attorney General of Wisconsin. He came in fourth in a four-way primary election whose winner was Bronson La Follette and which also included Anthony Earl, later Governor of Wisconsin.

His legislative papers are in the archives of the Wisconsin Historical Society.

== After the legislature ==
He continued to practice law in Madison, and in 2005 celebrated his 50th year as an attorney.
