= Ernest Warner =

20th century American politician

Member of the Wisconsin State Assembly from the Dane 1st district
- In office January 2, 1905 – January 7, 1907
- Preceded by: Matthew S. Dudgeon
- Succeeded by: Elmore Elver

Personal details
- Born: Ernest Noble Warner; July 23, 1868 Windsor, Wisconsin, U.S.
- Died: July 8, 1930 (aged 61) Madison, Wisconsin, U.S.
- Cause of death: Traffic collision
- Resting place: Forest Hill Cemetery, Madison, Wisconsin
- Spouse: Lillian Dale Baker (m. 1894; died 1924)
- Children: John Clement Warner^{(b. 1896; died 1956)}; Elizabeth (Risser)^{(b. 1900; died 1977)}
- Parent: Clement Warner (father)
- Relatives: Fred Risser (grandson)
- Education: University of Wisconsin–Madison
- Profession: lawyer

Ernest Noble Warner (July 23, 1868 – July 8, 1930) was an American educator, lawyer, and progressive Republican politician. He served one term in the Wisconsin State Assembly, representing Madison. He was the son of Union Army colonel Clement Warner, and the grandfather of Wisconsin state senator Fred A. Risser. Warner Park in Madison is named after him.

== Early life and education ==
Warner was born on his parents' farm in Windsor, Wisconsin, on July 23, 1868, the son of Col. Clement Warner and Eliza Warner (née Noble). Clement Warner was at that time a state senator, and later served a term in the Assembly. Ernest attended the district public school. He graduated from Madison High School in 1885, and the University of Wisconsin–Madison's modern classics course in 1889. He graduated from the University of Wisconsin Law School in 1892.

== Career ==
He taught a country school for one term while attending the University of Wisconsin, and was principal of Mazomanie High School for one year after graduation. He was admitted to the State Bar of Wisconsin in July 1891 and took up law practice in Madison.

Warner was the Republican nominee for district attorney of Dane County in 1892 but lost. He was a law examiner in the Wisconsin Department of Justice from 1899 to 1903 and secretary of the Dane County Republican campaign committee from 1902 to 1904.

In 1904, Warner was elected to the Wisconsin State Assembly from Dane County's 1st Assembly district (the Towns of Blooming Grove, Dunn, Madison and Pleasant Springs, and the city of Madison) to succeed fellow Republican Matthew S. Dudgeon, receiving 3,761 votes to 2,926 for Democrat Joseph C. Schubert. He served as floor leader for the Progressive faction of the Wisconsin Republican Assemblymen, shepherding through Progressive bills for civil service reform and for primary elections.

He did not run for re-election in 1906, and was succeeded in the Assembly by Democrat Elmore Elver.

Warner long continued in the practice of law, eventually forming a partnership with Fred E. Risser. Risser married Warner's daughter, Elizabeth, and served three terms in the State Senate as a member of the short-lived Wisconsin Progressive Party.

== Personal life ==
On July 5, 1894, he married Lillian Dale Baker, a classmate at Madison High School and also at the University of Wisconsin. They maintained a family farm, Merrill Springs Farm, at a location which was then outside Madison.

Lillian Warner died on May 23, 1924. Ernest Warner, who had been president of the Madison Park and Pleasure Drive Association since 1912, died after an automobile accident in July 1930. Within two weeks of his death, the Ernest N. Warner Memorial Park Committee was formed to raise $20,000 to buy the beach that later became Warner Park as a memorial.
