= Harold Groves =

American politician

Harold M. Groves
- Born: October 3, 1897; Lodi, Wisconsin, US
- Died: December 2, 1969 (aged 72)

Academic background
- Education: University of Wisconsin–Madison
- Doctoral advisor: John R. Commons

Academic work
- Institutions: University of Wisconsin–Madison
- Doctoral students: Joseph A. Pechman

Harold Martin Groves (October 3, 1897 – December 2, 1969) was a member of the Wisconsin State Assembly and the Wisconsin State Senate.

== Biography ==
Groves was born on October 3, 1897, in Lodi, Wisconsin. He attended the University of Wisconsin–Madison and Harvard Law School. From 1927 to 1968, he was a member of the faculty of the University of Wisconsin–Madison. Groves died on December 2, 1969.

== Political career ==
Groves was a member of the Senate from 1932 to 1936, at which time he was succeeded by Fred Risser. Previously, he was a member of the Assembly from 1930 to 1932. He was affiliated with the Wisconsin Progressive Party. One of his achievements in Wisconsin was the passage of the first unemployment compensation law in the United States, dubbed the Groves Law, in the early 1930s.
