= State Museum of Pennsylvania =

The State Museum of Pennsylvania
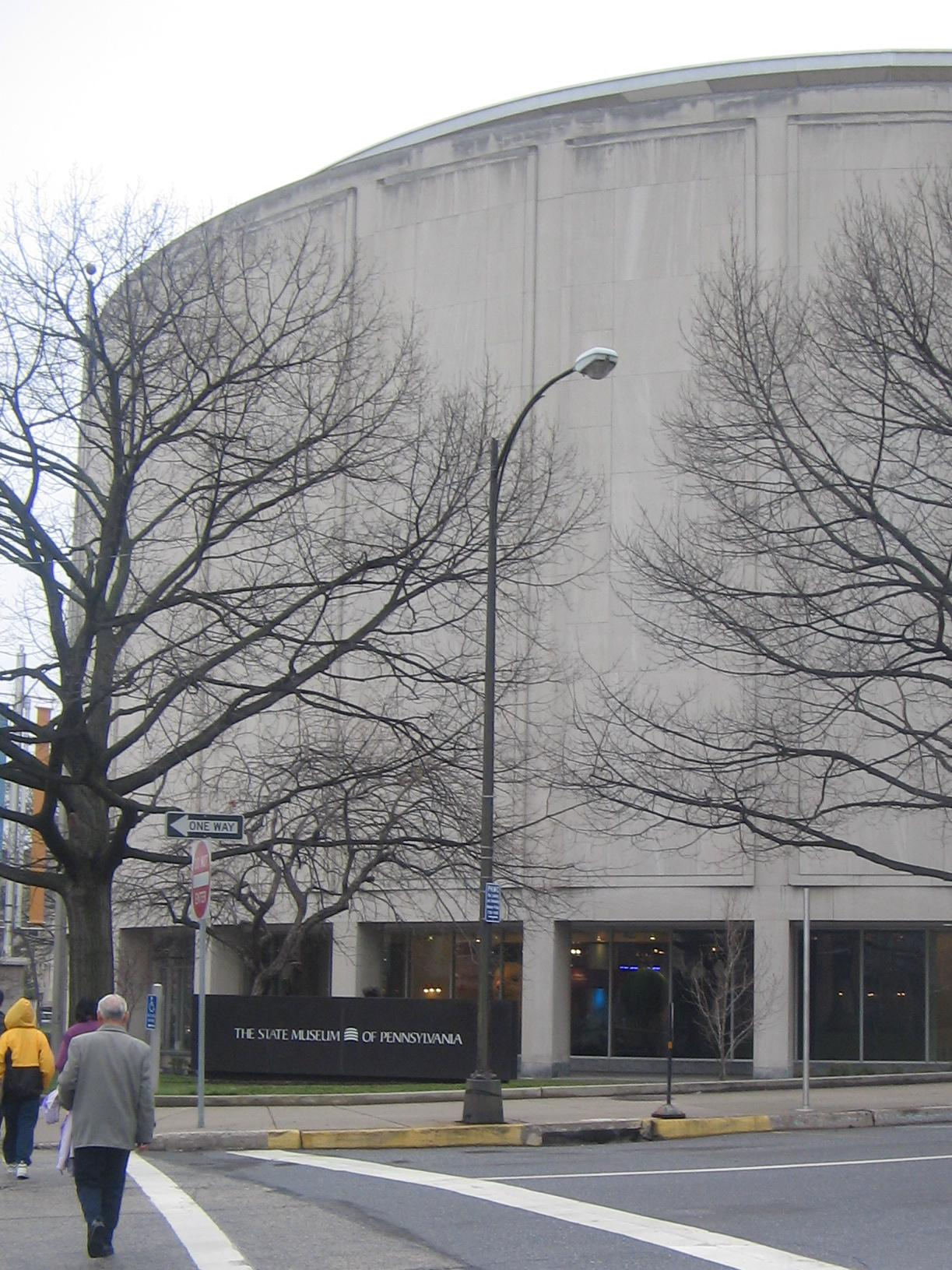
- (Pictured March 2007) The State Museum of Pennsylvania at 300 North Street in Harrisburg, PA
- Former name: William Penn Memorial Museum
- Established: March 28, 1905
- Location: 300 North Street, Harrisburg, Pennsylvania, 17120 U.S.
- Coordinates: 40.265672°N 76.885812°W
- Type: History museum
- Collections: Pennsylvania cultural and natural history
- Collection size: 3 million
- Public transit access: North 3rd Street & North Street, CAT
- Parking: Metered parking
- Website: statemuseumpa.org

Association of Science-Technology Centers
- astc.org

The State Museum of Pennsylvania is a non-profit history museum at 300 North Street in downtown Harrisburg, Pennsylvania, United States. It is run by the Pennsylvania Historical and Museum Commission to preserve and interpret the Commonwealth's history and culture. It is a part of the Pennsylvania State Capitol Complex.

== History ==
On March 28, 1905, Governor Samuel W. Pennypacker signed legislation establishing the museum for "the preservation of objects illustrating the flora and fauna of the state, and its mineralogy, geology, archeology, arts and history." The State Museum of Pennsylvania mission statement was influenced by the many other state museums that were already established, including those in New York (New York State Museum), Illinois (Illinois State Museum), and Indiana (Indiana State Museum).

Later in 1905, Pennypacker signed Act 481, giving the museum $20,000 in startup funding for its creation. On March 1, 1907, the museum staff and collection moved into the Executive Office Building. It became part of the Pennsylvania Historical and Museum Commission in 1945 and moved to its present building in 1964. It is located in the Capitol Complex at the corner of North and Third streets and adjacent to the Pennsylvania State Capitol. The building, designed by the Harrisburg architectural firm of Lawrie and Green, is round, and the museum exhibits are on its ground, first, second, and third floors. The museum staff's offices and those of the Pennsylvania Historical and Museum Commission are on the fourth and fifth floors.

In 2014, the building was listed on the National Register of Historic Places.

In August 2026, the museum closed for comprehensive renovations until 2029.

== Exhibits ==
The museum's central hall features a large statue of William Penn, who founded the Province of Pennsylvania in 1681 during the British colonial era.

The museum includes a multi-media planetarium, as well as four floors of exhibits and displays covering Pennsylvania history from prehistoric times through current events. Visitation averages 315,000 people annually. Among the features are an extensive collection of artifacts and exhibitions related to the American Civil War including Peter Rothermel's massive Battle of Gettysburg: Pickett's Charge, and an extensive collection of industrial and technological innovations, including artwork, paintings, dioramas, and other audio-visuals aid in the interpretation.

There are over three million objects in the museum's collections. The museum has many exhibits that showcase Pennsylvania history. The state museum divided its exhibits into three categories; permanent, changing, and online.
