= Matthew S. Dudgeon =

American politician (1871–1949)

Matthew Dudgeon
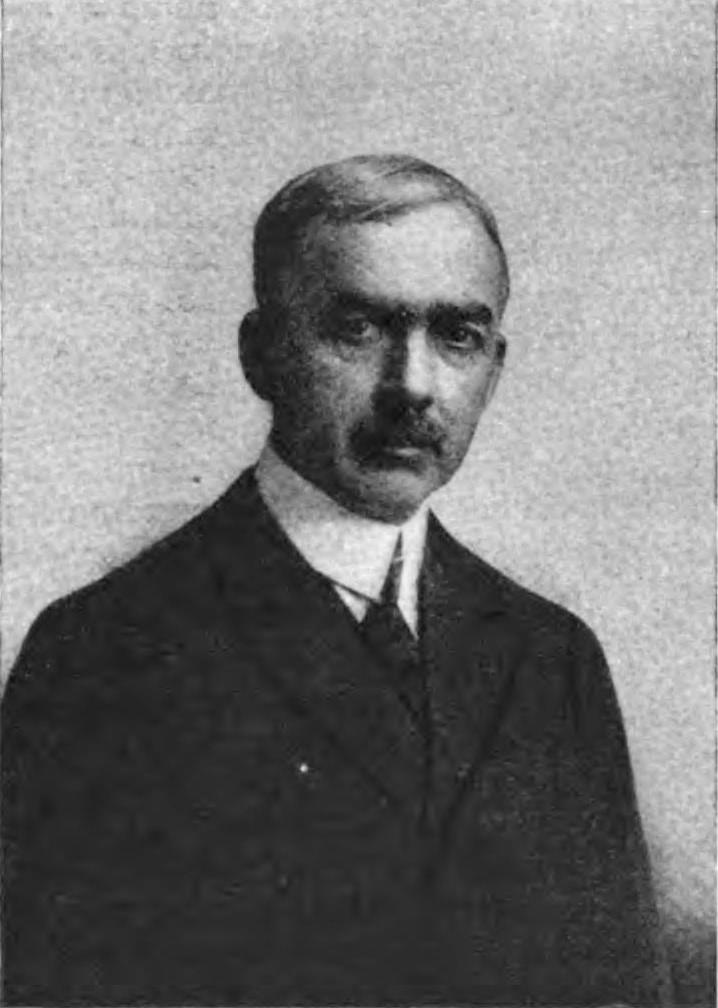

Member of the Wisconsin State Assembly from the Dane 1st district
- In office January 5, 1903 – January 2, 1905
- Preceded by: E. Ray Stevens
- Succeeded by: Ernest Warner

District Attorney of Dane County, Wisconsin
- In office January 2, 1899 – January 5, 1903
- Preceded by: Andrew W. Anderson
- Succeeded by: Frank L. Gilbert

Personal details
- Born: June 18, 1871 Madison, Wisconsin, U.S.
- Died: July 26, 1949 (aged 78) Milwaukee, Wisconsin, U.S.
- Resting place: Forest Hill Cemetery, Madison, Wisconsin
- Party: Republican

Military service
- Allegiance: United States
- Branch/service: United States Volunteers
- Years of service: 1898
- Unit: 1st Reg. Wis. Vol. Infantry
- Battles/wars: Spanish–American War

Matthew Simpson Dudgeon (June 18, 1871 – July 26, 1949) was director of the Milwaukee Public Library from 1920 to 1941. Earlier, he was a member of the Wisconsin State Assembly, representing Madison in the 1903 session, and served four years as district attorney of Dane County, Wisconsin.

== Biography ==
Matthew Dudgeon was born in Madison, Wisconsin. He served as director of the Milwaukee Public Library and president of the Wisconsin Library Association and was inducted into the Wisconsin Library Hall of Fame in 2009. Dudgeon died in Milwaukee in 1949.

== Political career ==
Dudgeon was elected to the Assembly in 1902. Previously, he served two terms as district attorney of Dane County, Wisconsin. He was a Republican.

Wisconsin State Assembly
Preceded by E. Ray Stevens	Member of the Wisconsin State Assembly from the Dane 1st district January 5, 1903 – January 2, 1905	Succeeded by Ernest Warner
Legal offices
Preceded by Andrew W. Anderson	District Attorney of Dane County, Wisconsin; January 2, 1899 – January 5, 1903	Succeeded by Frank L. Gilbert
