= Bass Otis =

American painter (1784–1861)

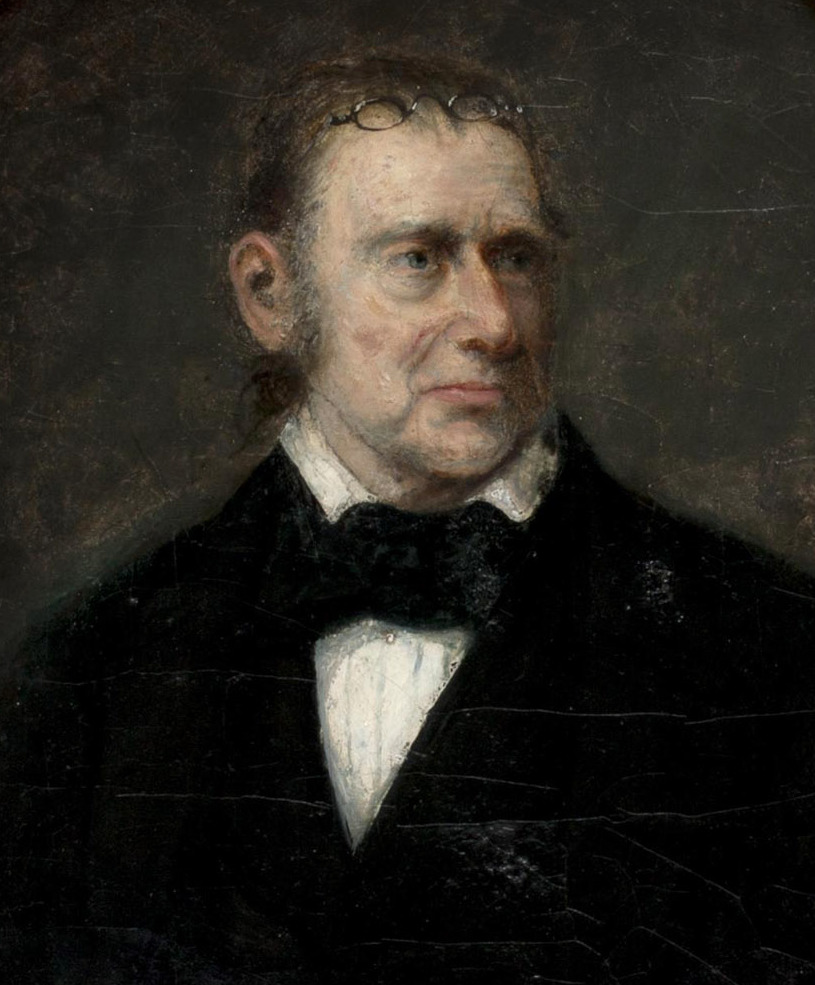
Self-portrait, 1860

Bass Otis (July 17, 1784 – November 3, 1861) was an American painter. He painted hundreds of portraits including many of the best known Americans of his day, and produced the first American lithograph in 1819.

== Career ==
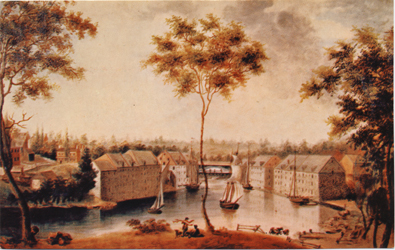
Brandywine flour mills painted by Bass Otis about 1840

Otis patented the perspective protractor in 1815. With Philadelphia publisher Joseph Delaplaine, he began painting portraits for "Delaplaine's Repository of the Lives and Portraits of Distinguished American Characters". In 1816, Otis painted portraits of Thomas Jefferson, James Madison and Dolley Madison. In total, Otis painted twenty-four portraits for the "Repository", though only the Jefferson portrait was published before the end of the project in 1818. Some of the remaining portraits were exhibited in Delaplaine’s Philadelphia gallery, which became part of Rubens Peale's New York museum. Otis produced the first American lithograph, which was published in the July 1819 issue of Analectic Magazine, together with an article on the lithographic process.

Otis's notebooks, dated between 1819 and 1826, record over 300 portraits painted, including portraits of artist John Neagle, the Reverend Shepard Kosciusko Kollock, Victor Marie du Pont, John Greenleaf Whittier, Senator John C. Frémont, and the Reverend James Abercrombie. He painted a famous postmortem portrait of Philadelphia financier Stephen Girard. Other well-known sitters included author James Fenimore Cooper, Thomas Garrett, and U.S. President William Henry Harrison.

Otis primarily worked in Philadelphia, but also worked in Boston (1837, 1846–58) and in Wilmington, Delaware (1839, 1840s) and in Providence, Rhode Island (1858–61). His students included Henry Inman, Peter F. Rothermel and John Neagle.

== Gallery ==
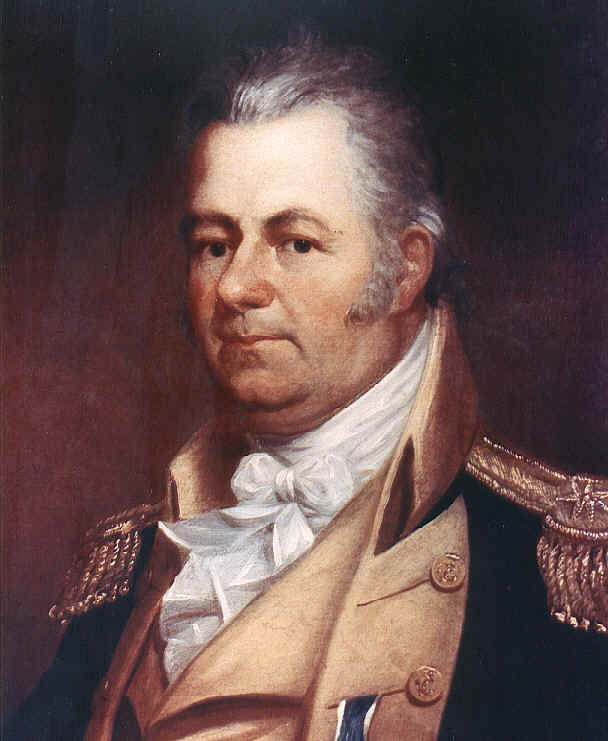
Portrait of Thomas Tuxtun, 1817.

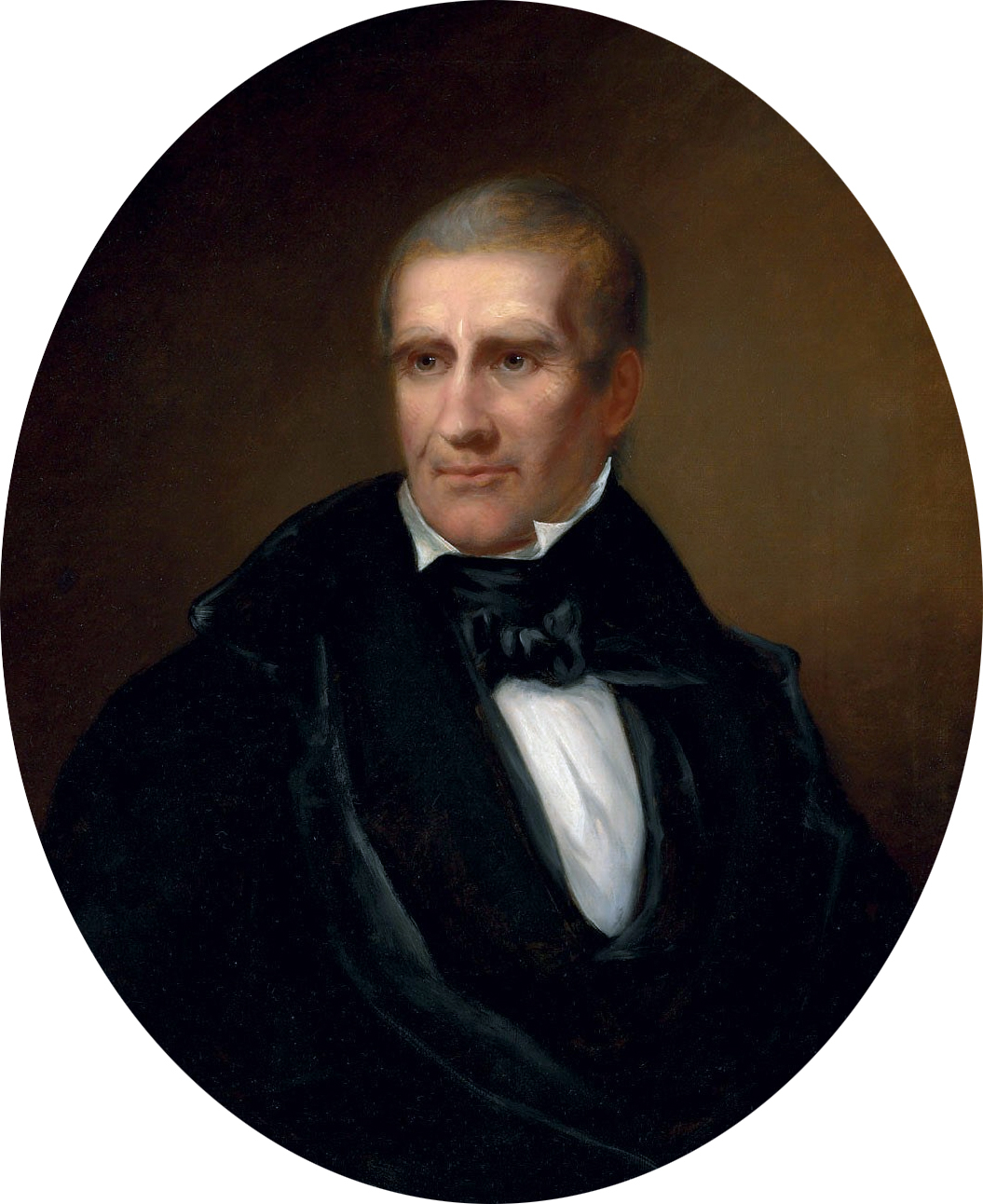
Portrait of President William Henry Harrison, 1841

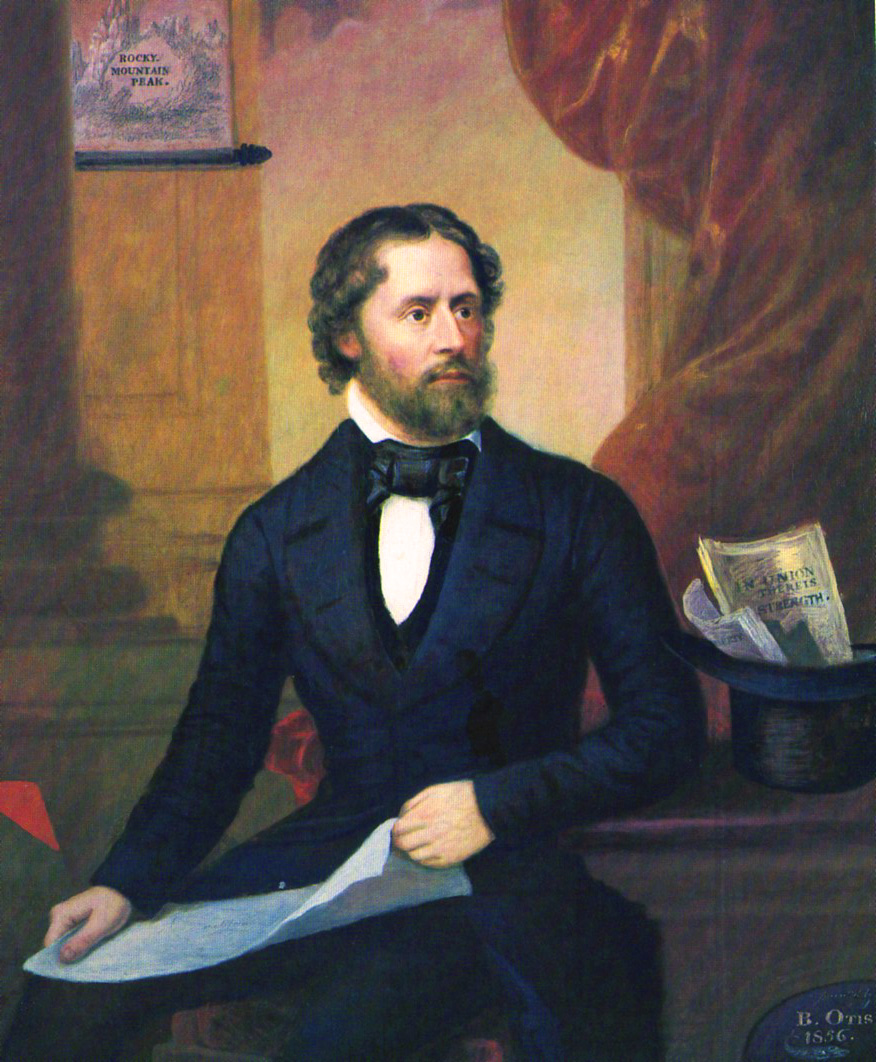
Portrait of John C. Fremont, 1856.
