= 36th Wisconsin Infantry Regiment =

Union Army infantry regiment

- Flag of Wisconsin
- Active: March 23, 1864 – July 12, 1865
- Country: United States
- Allegiance: Union
- Branch: Infantry
- Size: Regiment
- Engagements: American Civil War: Overland Campaign; Battle of Spotsylvania Court House; Battle of North Anna; Battle of Totopotomoy Creek; Battle of Cold Harbor; Siege of Petersburg; Second Battle of Petersburg; Battle of Jerusalem Plank Road; First Battle of Deep Bottom; Second Battle of Deep Bottom; Second Battle of Ream's Station; Battle of Boydton Plank Road; Battle of Hatcher's Run; Appomattox campaign; Battle of Lewis's Farm; Third Battle of Petersburg; Battle of High Bridge; Battle of Cumberland Church; Battle of Appomattox Court House

Commanders
- Colonel: Frank A. Haskell
- Colonel: John A. Savage Jr.
- Colonel: Harvey M. Brown
- Colonel: Clement Warner
- Captain: Austin Cannon
- Captain: George A. Fisk

The 36th Wisconsin Infantry Regiment was a volunteer infantry regiment that served in the Union Army during the American Civil War. Their entire service was spent in II Corps, with the Army of the Potomac in the eastern theater of the war.

== Service ==
The 36th Wisconsin was organized at Camp Randall in Madison, Wisconsin, and mustered into federal service on March 23, 1864.

The regiment was mustered out on July 12, 1865.

== Casualties ==
The 36th Wisconsin suffered 7 officers and 150 enlisted men killed or fatally wounded in action and 3 officers and 182 enlisted men who died of disease, for a total of 342 fatalities.

Salisbury Prison, otherwise known as Camp Lee North Carolina. Many men from the 36th Wisconsin were sent there. Due to the conditions they experienced many died. The camp dug 13 trenches to dispose of the dead that is now a National Cemetery. The 36th had many buried in those mass graves.

== Commanders ==
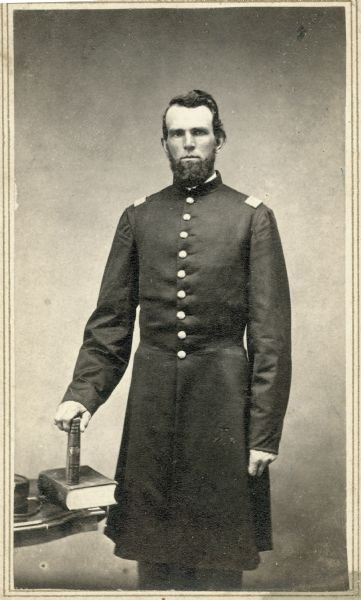
Colonel Clement Warner.

- Colonel Frank A. Haskell (March 23, 1864 – June 3, 1864) — Killed in action at the Battle of Cold Harbor, previously served in the 6th Wisconsin Infantry Regiment.
- Colonel John A. Savage Jr. (June 3, 1864 – June 18, 1864) — Killed in action at the Second Battle of Petersburg.
- Colonel Harvey M. Brown (June 18, 1864 – October 27, 1864) — Wounded at the Second Battle of Petersburg at the same place Colonel Savage was killed, only held nominal command of the regiment.
- Colonel Clement Warner (October 27, 1864 – July 12, 1865) — Entered service as captain of Co. B, wounded at Second Battle of Deep Bottom, lost an arm, but returned to command the regiment through the end of the war.
  - Captain Austin Cannon was in operational command of the regiment from the time of Colonel Warner's injury on August 14, 1864, until the return of Captain George A. Fisk, who was senior captain.
  - Captain George A. Fisk was in operation command of the regiment from September 1864 until Colonel Warner returned to active duty in December 1864.

== Notable people ==
- John W. Thomas was a private in Co. K. He later became a Wisconsin state senator and the 8th Wisconsin railroad commissioner.
- George Weeks served as first lieutenant of Co. B., promoted to captain after the war, later became a politician.

== See also ==
- List of Wisconsin Civil War units
- Wisconsin in the American Civil War
