= Frank A. Haskell =

Union Army officer

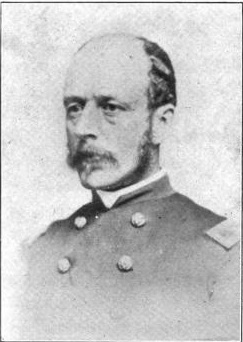
- Born: July 13, 1828; Tunbridge, Vermont
- Died: June 3, 1864 (aged 35); Cold Harbor, Virginia
- Burial place: Silver Lake Cemetery; Portage, Wisconsin
- Military career
- Allegiance: United States
- Branch: United States Army; Union Army
- Service years: 1861–64
- Rank: Colonel
- Commands: 36th Reg. Wis. Vol. Infantry; 1st Brig., 2nd Div., II Corps
- Conflicts: American Civil War: Second Battle of Bull Run; Battle of South Mountain; Battle of Antietam; Battle of Fredericksburg; Chancellorsville Campaign; Second Fredericksburg; Battle of Gettysburg; Overland Campaign; Battle of Cold Harbor†
- Other work: Lawyer, author

Franklin Aretas Haskell (July 13, 1828 – June 3, 1864) was an American lawyer and Union Army officer during the American Civil War. He spent much of the war as a top aide to General John Gibbon, as Gibbon ascended the ranks from brigade to division to corps command. On the third day of the Battle of Gettysburg, their corps bore the brunt of the pivotal Confederate assault; Haskell personally rallied the troops of Gibbon's division after Gibbon was wounded. Gibbon later commented that "I have always thought that to him, more than to any one man, are we indebted for the repulse of Lee's assault."

In 1864, Haskell was promoted to colonel and given his own command, but he died just a few months later at the Battle of Cold Harbor. Before his death, Haskell wrote a famous account of the Battle of Gettysburg that was published posthumously.

== Early life ==
Haskell was born at Tunbridge, Vermont, to Aretas and Anna E. Folsom Haskell. He moved to Wisconsin to study law in the office of his brother Harrison. He graduated from Dartmouth College in 1854 and returned to Madison, Wisconsin, to practice law. During this period, Haskell became the drill master of a militia company.

== Civil War ==
When the Civil War began, Haskell enlisted in Col. Lysander Cutler's 6th Wisconsin Infantry of Brig. Gen. Rufus King's Brigade. This brigade would eventually be known as the Iron Brigade. He served as adjutant for the regiment with the rank of first lieutenant until April 1862, when he was made aide-de-camp for Brig. Gen. John Gibbon, the new Commander of the Iron Brigade. While with the Iron Brigade, Haskell saw action during the Northern Virginia Campaign and the Maryland Campaign. When Gibbon was promoted to command of the 2nd Division, I Corps, Haskell went with him and remained his aide. This division saw action at the Battle of Fredericksburg. After Gibbon suffered a wound at Fredericksburg, he took time off to recuperate and was replaced in command of his division. He was later given command of the 2nd Division, II Corps and again Haskell remained his aide. This division saw action during the Chancellorsville Campaign.

== Gettysburg ==
Gibbon's Division headed north toward Pennsylvania during the Gettysburg campaign and was in Taneytown, Maryland, when the Battle of Gettysburg began. Gibbon was given temporary command of II Corps after I Corps Commander Maj. Gen. John F. Reynolds was killed and Maj. Gen. George G. Meade ordered II Corps Commander Maj. Gen. Winfield S. Hancock to Gettysburg to assume command. Haskell and II Corps did not arrive on the battlefield until July 2, 1863. There they took part in the defense of Cemetery Ridge, the area around the Nicholas Codori Farm, and supported III Corps, commanded by Daniel E. Sickles, in their defense of the Peach Orchard. In his recollections of the Battle, Haskell was highly critical of Sickles as a soldier and a person as well as his move forward that led to his III Corps being attacked by the Confederates.

That night, Gibbon took part in a council of war called by Meade which Haskell recorded in his recollections of the Battle. On July 3, Gibbon was back in command of his division and Haskell was by his side. Late that morning, Gibbon hosted a meal for much of the Union high command which Haskell also recorded for posterity. Shortly after the luncheon broke up Confederate artillery began to shell the area where Gibbon's men were positioned. Gibbon's position bore the brunt of the Confederate attack known as Pickett's Charge. Haskell rallied Gibbon's men after the Confederates had breached the stone wall and Gibbon had been wounded. Hancock, Gibbon, Brig. Gen.William Harrow, Col. Norman J. Hall, and Col. A.F. Devereux (19th Mass.) commended Haskell for his performance, with Gibbon later writing that "I have always thought that to him, more than to any one man, are we indebted for the repulse of Lee's assault."

A few weeks after the Battle, Haskell wrote the account of what he had experienced at Gettysburg to his brother Harrison in Portage, Wisconsin. At the time, Harrison could not even get a newspaper to publish the account. Haskell's account would be published in 1898 as a book called The Battle of Gettysburg. This account was hailed by Bruce Catton as "One of the genuine classics of Civil War literature."

Gibbon and Haskell returned to Gettysburg in November 1863 to attend the dedication of the Soldiers' National Cemetery and witnessed President Abraham Lincoln's Gettysburg Address after recreating their role in the battle for some tourists on Cemetery Ridge.

== Death ==
On February 9, 1864, Haskell was appointed colonel of the 36th Wisconsin Infantry Regiment. On June 3, he assumed command of the 1st Brigade, 2nd Division, II Corps, when its commander Col. Henry Boyd McKeen was killed during the Battle of Cold Harbor. Shortly after taking command he was shot through the temple and killed while leading a charge. A distraught Gibbon cried out: "My God! I have lost my best friend, and one of the best soldiers in the Army of the Potomac has fallen!" Gibbon wrote to his wife that he had planned to promote "poor Haskell" to field command after the battle.

== Haskell's Battle of Gettysburg in popular culture ==
Haskell's writings were instrumental in influencing the direction of Peter Rothermel's 1870 painting of Pickett's Charge.

Haskell's account is reprinted in volume 43, "American Historical Documents", of The Harvard Classics.

In The Killer Angels, the novel by Michael Shaara, part 4 ("Friday, July 3, 1863"), chapter 3 ("Chamberlain"), Col. Joshua Lawrence Chamberlain goes to see Gen. Sykes, his corps commander, where there is a lunch for the senior commanders, and is finally taken some chicken by Lt. Haskell himself. That lunch is from Haskell's account.

In The Civil War, the documentary by Ken Burns, the subtitle of Episode 5, "The Universe of Battle", comes from Haskell's account, where, shortly after the lunch, he and Gen. Gibbon are sitting, watching the great cannonade of the third day. During "Gettysburg: The Third Day", Garrison Keillor reads a relevant excerpt.
