= Battle of Gettysburg: Pickett's Charge =

Painting by Peter Rothermel

- Artist: Peter F. Rothermel
- Year: 1870
- Medium: oil on canvas
- Dimensions: 490 cm × 980 cm (192 in × 384 in)
- Location: State Museum of Pennsylvania, Harrisburg, Pennsylvania

Battle of Gettysburg: Pickett's Charge is an oil-on-canvas painting by the American painter Peter F. Rothermel from 1870. The painting depicts Pickett's Charge, the climactic moment of the Battle of Gettysburg in which Confederate general George Pickett led a frontal assault on entrenched Union forces with disastrous results. Depicting what is considered the high-water mark of the Confederacy, the painting was commissioned by Pennsylvania governor Andrew Gregg Curtin and is currently on display in the State Museum of Pennsylvania.

== Historical context ==
In his annual message to the Pennsylvania legislature in January 1866, governor Andrew Curtin proposed commissioning a painting of the Battle of Gettysburg for display in the city library of Harrisburg. Later that year, a legislative committee selected Peter Rothermel for the project, contracting him to produce five panels depicting key moments from the battle. Rothermel spent multiple years researching the subject, interviewing veterans, and making repeated visits to Gettysburg to survey the terrain before beginning the work. The largest of the panels, Battle of Gettysburg: Pickett's Charge displays the climax of the battle, and measures 16 feet tall by 32 feet wide. This single painting required over a year and a half to complete, during which Rothermel arranged for multiple figures from the war sit for their likenesses, including General George Meade.

Upon completion, the painting was deemed too large for installation in the state library. It was first on exhibited at the Pennsylvania Academy of Fine Arts in Philadelphia, then relocated to a purpose-built hall at Tenth and Chestnut streets. It subsequently toured the country visiting Boston, Chicago, and Pittsburgh, before moving back to Philadelphia for display in Memorial Hall during the 1876 Centennial Exposition. Finally, upon completion of the new library and State Department buildings in 1894, it was moved to back to the state capitol. Originally displayed in the state library, it was moved in 1964 to the Civil War wing of the State Museum of Pennsylvania.

The painting remains the largest single-panel painting by an American artist in the 19th century.

== Composition and analysis ==
Peter Rothermel was tasked with the difficult commission of portraying a three-day battle across just five paintings. The largest, to be "of a size not less than thirty feet in length and fifteen feet in height", was to be the centerpiece of the commission, and would demand the most attention. This enormous painting also had to balance historical accuracy with a fitting sense of valor for the soldiers involved. After considering the scope of the battle, and the many skirmishes spread across six thousand acres, Rothermel chose Pickett's Charge as the dramatic focus of the main painting. He chose to depict the battle as an ordinary soldier's fight, avoiding particular emphasis on the well-known generals involved in the charge. To this end, Rothermel relied extensively on the testimony of multiple sources who were present during the battle, but due to the fog of war he was unable to rely on any individual's memory. However, Rothermel found Frank A. Haskell's recollection of the battle most aligned with Meade's, and this testimony most directly influenced the outcome of the final composition.

While General George Meade is pictured in the image, the general later admitted to not being on the field during the repulse of the Confederate charge. Rothermel's reason for Meade's inclusion was due to the painting feeling "incomplete" without the "hero of Gettysburg" being present. This "compression of time and space" to include the battle's hero only drew minor concern from contemporary reviewers.
