= Analectic Magazine =

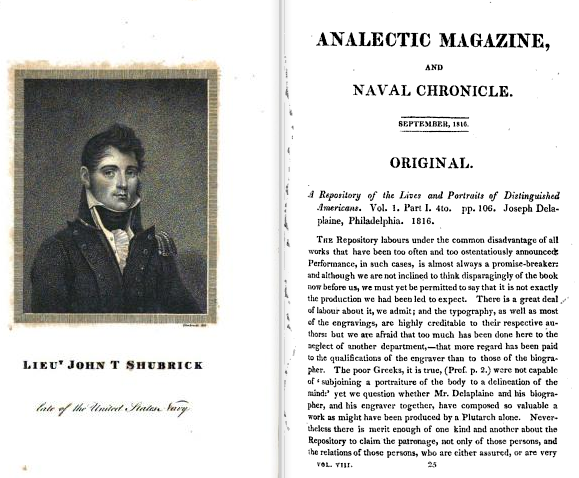
- Analectic Magazine, 1816
- Founder: Moses Thomas
- First issue: January 1813; 213 years ago
- Final issue: 1820
- Country: United States
- Based in: Philadelphia, Pennsylvania, U.S.
- Language: English
- OCLC: 1481055

The Analectic Magazine (1813–1820) was published in Philadelphia by Moses Thomas, and later, by James Maxwell. Washington Irving served as editor 1813-1814. The magazine was described as "comprising original reviews, biography, analytical abstracts of new publications, translations from French journals, and selections from the most esteemed British reviews." Some issues contained reprinted articles from the British press, and there were extensive book reviews. "The first lithograph ever made in America is in this magazine for July 1819. It represents a woodland scene — a flowing stream and a single house upon the bank. It was made by Bass Otis." Editor Maxwell became ill in 1820 and publication ceased.

Readers included U.S. president Thomas Jefferson. The National Archives has letters between Jefferson and James Maxwell detailing Jefferson's subscription to Analectic Magazine. A sampling of assorted topics includes:

- An Essay on the Life, Writings, and Opinions of Mr. de Malesherbes; addressed to my children: by the Count de Boissy d'Anglas, peer of France, member of the Royal Academy of Inscriptions and Belles-Lettres, and grand officer of the Royal order of the legion of honour, 2 vols. octavo. Paris and London. (1820).
- Rand's System of Penmanship, with Instructions, &c. Philadelphia, published by the author. (1819).
- Notes on the Missouri River, and some of the Native Tribes in its Neighborhood.-By a Military Gentleman attached to the Yellowstone Expedition in 1819. (1820).
- Sismondi on Prejudices: Prejudices of Memory. Translated from the French. (1820).
- "Defence of Fort M'Henry" by Francis Scott Key, the poem that became the lyrics of "The Star-Spangled Banner" (November 1814)
