= Fred Risser =

American politician (born 1927)

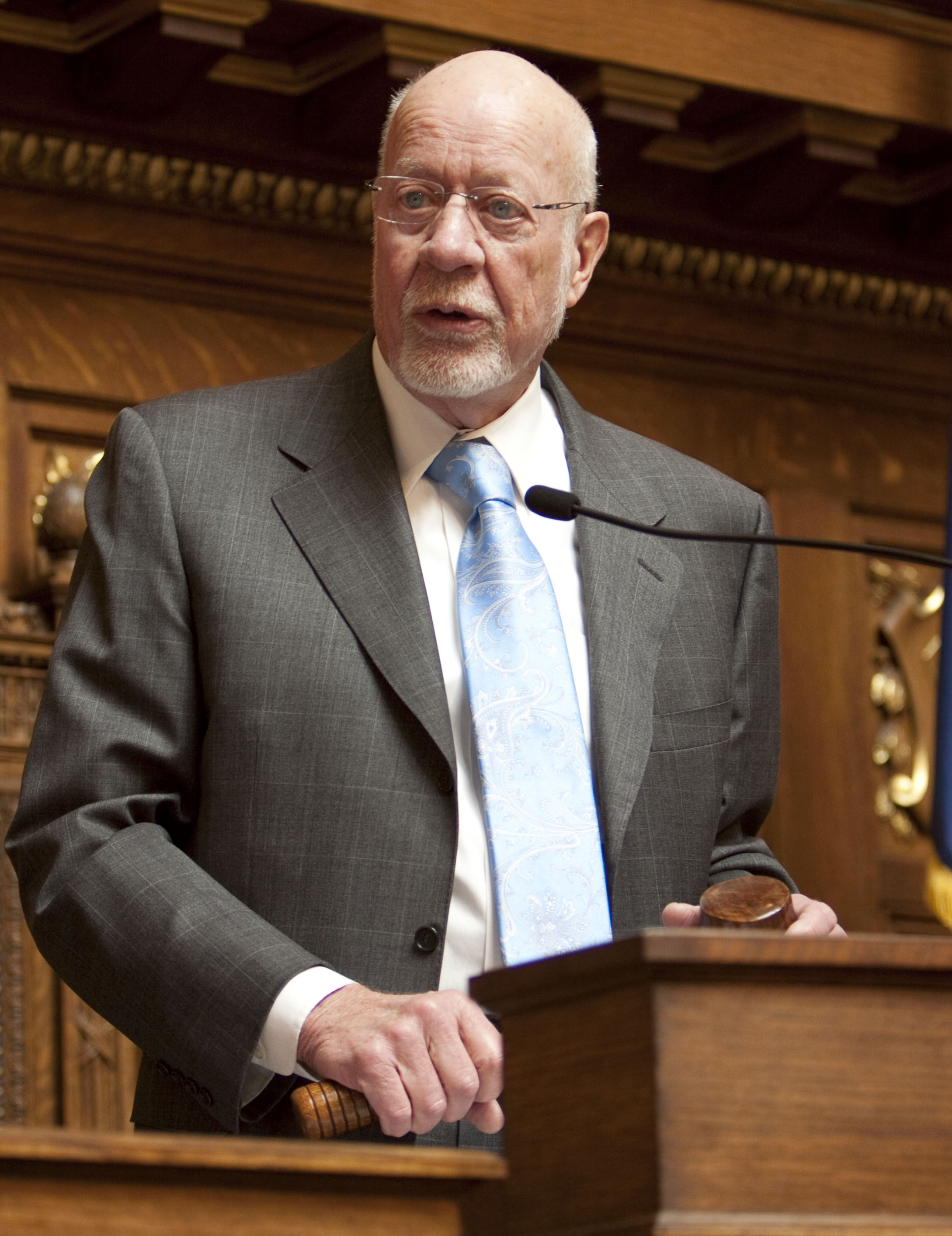
- Risser in 2009

Member of the Wisconsin Senate from the 26th district
- In office December 1, 1962 – January 4, 2021
- Preceded by: Horace W. Wilkie
- Succeeded by: Kelda Roys

President of the Wisconsin Senate
- In office July 17, 2012 – January 7, 2013
- Preceded by: Michael G. Ellis
- Succeeded by: Michael G. Ellis
- In office January 8, 2007 – January 3, 2011
- Preceded by: Alan Lasee
- Succeeded by: Michael G. Ellis
- In office January 4, 1999 – January 6, 2003
- Preceded by: Brian Rude
- Succeeded by: Alan Lasee
- In office July 9, 1996 – April 21, 1998
- Preceded by: Brian Rude
- Succeeded by: Brian Rude
- In office May 1, 1979 – January 9, 1995
- Preceded by: Russell Olson
- Succeeded by: Brian Rude

President pro tempore of the Wisconsin Senate
- In office January 6, 1975 – May 1, 1979
- Preceded by: Robert P. Knowles
- Succeeded by: Vacant until 1983; William A. Bablitch (1983)

Member of the Wisconsin State Assembly from the Dane 2nd district
- In office January 7, 1957 – December 1, 1962
- Preceded by: Ivan A. Nestingen
- Succeeded by: Edward Nager

Personal details
- Born: May 5, 1927 (age 99) Madison, Wisconsin, U.S.
- Party: Democratic
- Spouse(s): Betty Risser (died.) Nancy Risser
- Parent: Fred E. Risser (father)
- Relatives: Ernest Warner (grandfather); Clement Warner (great-grandfather)
- Education: University of Oregon (BA, LLB)
- Profession: Legislator

Military service
- Allegiance: United States
- Branch/service: United States Navy
- Years of service: 1945–1946
- Battles/wars: World War II

Fred Alan Risser (born May 5, 1927) is a retired American politician and attorney from Madison, Wisconsin. A member of the Democratic Party, Risser represented Madison in the Wisconsin Senate from 1957 to 2021. He holds the record as the longest-serving state legislator in American history, having served a total of 64 years (six years in the Wisconsin State Assembly and 58 years in the state Senate). Over his many years in the Senate, he also served more than 24 years as president of the Wisconsin Senate.

Risser is the fourth generation of his family to serve in the Wisconsin Legislature. His father, Fred E. Risser, served 12 years in the Wisconsin Senate as a member of the short-lived Wisconsin Progressive Party.

== Early life, education and career ==
Risser was born in Madison, Wisconsin on May 5, 1927 into a prolific Wisconsin political family. Risser's father (Fred E. Risser), grandfather (Ernest Warner), and great-grandfather (Clement Warner) were all Wisconsin legislators representing part or all of Dane County, although none were Democrats. Risser's father was a member of the State Senate for 12 years.

Risser served in the United States Navy during World War II from 1945 to 1946. He was sworn into the Navy shortly before his high school graduation and Victory in Europe Day. He was a medic and served in Newport, Rhode Island, and the Panama Canal Zone.

Risser used the G.I. Bill to attend college, attending the University of Wisconsin–Madison and Carleton College before transferring to the University of Oregon. He received a Bachelor of Arts from Oregon in 1950 and a Bachelor of Laws from the University of Oregon School of Law in 1952. Risser became a member of the State Bar of Wisconsin and the Oregon State Bar and practiced law in Wisconsin.

== Wisconsin Legislature ==
A Democrat, Risser served for six years in the Wisconsin Assembly (1957–1963) and 58 years in the Wisconsin Senate (1963–2021). He represented most of the city of Madison, including the campus of the University of Wisconsin–Madison.

By 2019, Risser was the only World War II veteran serving as a state legislator in the United States. At the time of his 2021 retirement, Risser was the longest-tenured state legislator in the history of the United States. He is known as a progressive, and has passed legislation allowing contraceptives to be sold to unmarried persons and banning smoking in indoor establishments. Risser has never lost an election.

=== Wisconsin Assembly ===
Risser was first elected to the Wisconsin State Assembly in 1956, succeeding fellow Democrat Ivan A. Nestingen (who had resigned in April of that year after he was elected mayor of Madison). He was re-elected in 1958 and 1960. Risser left the Assembly in 1963 after being elected to the state Senate in 1962. He was succeeded in the Wisconsin Assembly by fellow Democrat Edward Nager.

=== Wisconsin Senate ===
Risser was elected to the state Senate in a 1962 special election triggered by the appointment of Horace W. Wilkie to the Wisconsin Supreme Court. He was elected to a full term in 1964. He rose through the ranks quickly, becoming the minority leader in 1967 due to his intense study of parliamentary procedure. After the Democrats gained the Senate majority in the 1974 election, Risser was elected as president pro tempore beginning in the 1975 session. He continued as president pro tempore until a state constitutional amendment in 1979 separated the offices of Lieutenant Governor of Wisconsin and President of the Senate. When the amendment was certified on May 1, 1979, Risser was elected president of the Senate and the office of president pro tempore became defunct for a number of years. Risser held the office of president of the Senate continuously for the next 16 years, until Democrats lost the majority in the 1994 election. He was returned to the office of president every time the Democrats held the majority in the subsequent 20 years. Risser served as Senate Majority Leader for 25 years.

==== 2011 Wisconsin protests ====
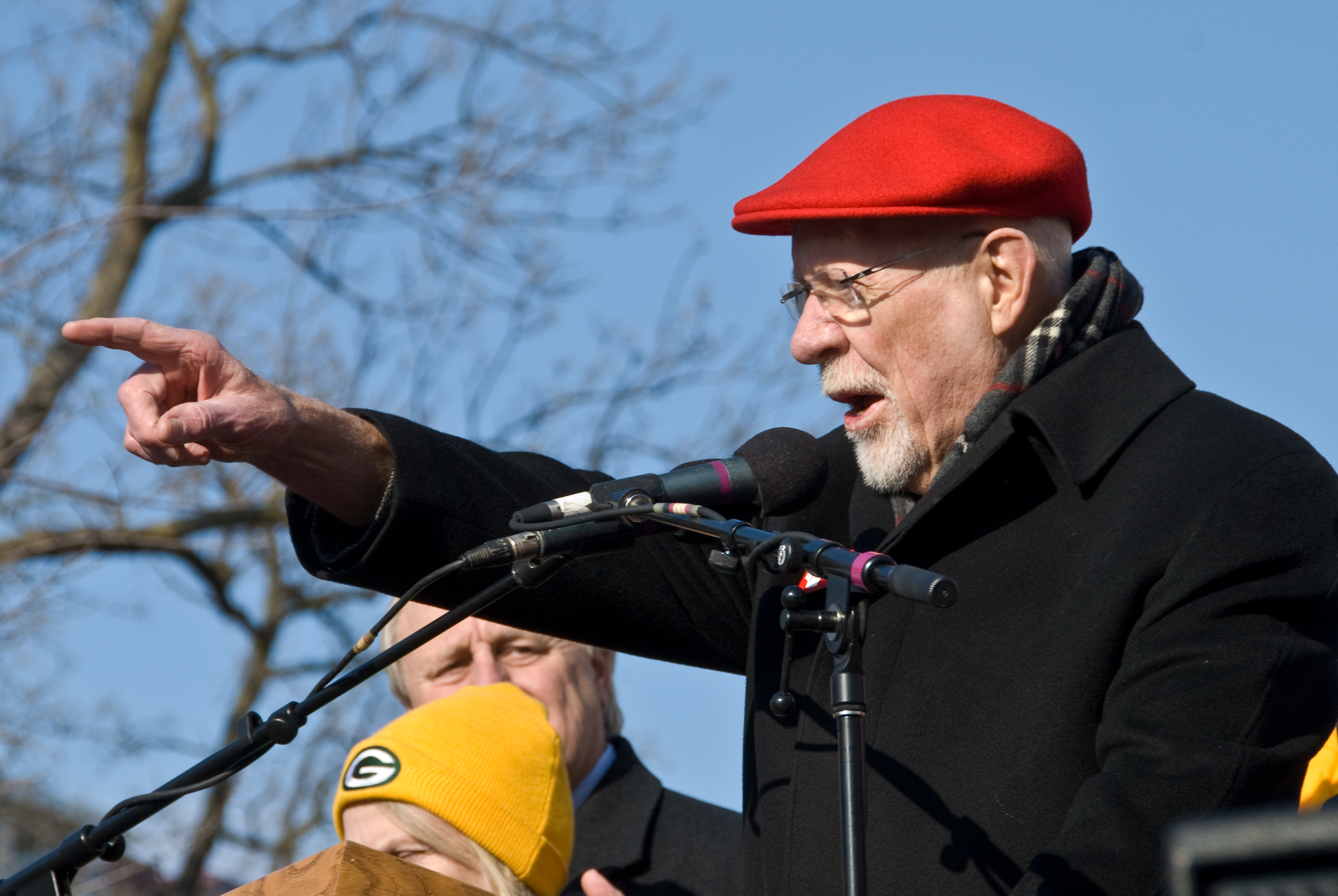
Risser speaking at the March 12, 2011, protest outside of the Wisconsin State Capitol

During the 2011 protests in Wisconsin, Risser, along with the 13 other Democratic State Senators, left the state to deny the State Senate a quorum on Governor Scott Walker's "Budget Repair" legislation.

==== Retirement ====
On March 26, 2020, Risser announced that he would not run for re-election in November 2020. He left office in 2021 at the age of 93.

== Other political involvement ==
Risser was a delegate to both the 1960 Democratic National Convention and the 1964 Democratic National Convention. He served as chair of Wisconsin's presidential electors during the 1964 presidential election.

== Personal life ==
Risser's first wife, Betty, died after 21 years of marriage. Risser is married to Nancy Risser, a retired Spanish teacher. He has three children and several grandchildren.

Wisconsin State Assembly
Preceded by Ivan A. Nestingen	Member of the Wisconsin State Assembly from the Dane 2nd district January 7, 1957 – December 1, 1962	Succeeded by Edward Nager
Wisconsin Senate
Preceded by Horace W. Wilkie	Member of the Wisconsin Senate from the 26th district December 1, 1962 – January 4, 2021	Succeeded by Kelda Roys
Preceded by Robert P. Knowles	President pro tempore of the Wisconsin Senate; 1975 – 1979	Succeeded by William A. Bablitch (1983)
Preceded by Russell Olson	President of the Wisconsin Senate; 1979 – 1995	Succeeded by Brian Rude
Preceded by Brian Rude	President of the Wisconsin Senate; 1996 – 1998	Succeeded by Brian Rude
Preceded by Brian Rude	President of the Wisconsin Senate; 1999 – 2003	Succeeded by Alan Lasee
Preceded by Alan Lasee	President of the Wisconsin Senate; 2007 – 2011	Succeeded by Michael Ellis
Preceded by Michael Ellis	President of the Wisconsin Senate; 2012 – 2013	Succeeded by Michael Ellis
