= Peter F. Rothermel =

American painter

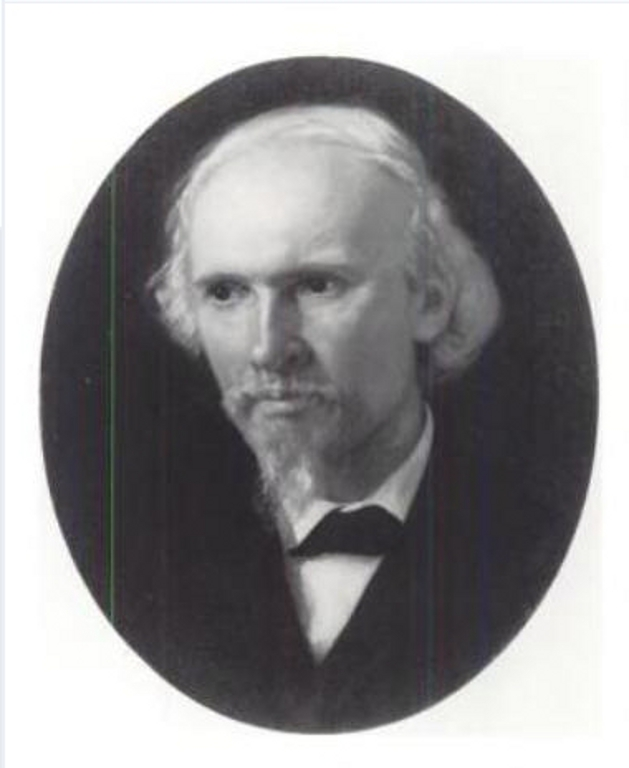
- Rothermel in c. 1885
- Born: July 8, 1812; Nescopeck, Pennsylvania, U.S.
- Died: August 15, 1895 (aged 78); Linfield, Pennsylvania, U.S.
- Education: John Rubens Smith; Bass Otis
- Known for: History painter
- Notable work: Battle of Gettysburg: Pickett's Charge; Patrick Henry Before the Virginia House of Burgesses (1851); The Battle of Gettysburg (1871)
- Movement: Romanticism

Peter Frederick Rothermel (July 8, 1812 – August 15, 1895) was an American painter.

== Early life and education ==
Rothermel was born in Nescopeck, Pennsylvania on July 8, 1812, although various sources give his birth year as 1813, 1814, and 1817. The artist's gravestone in Philadelphia gives the date as 1812. He had a common-school education, and studied land surveying. At age 20, he moved to Philadelphia and became a sign painter. Then at age 22, he took up the study of art. He was instructed in drawing by John Rubens Smith, and subsequently became a pupil of Bass Otis in Philadelphia.

== Career ==
In 1844, his work, De Soto discovering the Mississippi, was purchased by the Art Union and marked his first success as an artist. He served as vice president of the Artists' Fund Society in 1844 and as director of the Pennsylvania Academy of Fine Arts from 1847 to 1855.

During 1856-1859 he was in Europe, residing for about two years in Rome, and visiting also the principal cities in England, France, Germany, Belgium, and Italy. On his return to the United States, he returned to Philadelphia and was elected a member of the Pennsylvania Academy of Fine Arts, where he also taught notable artists of that era, including Charles Lewis Fussell.

He specialized in portraits and dramatic historical paintings. His most famous paintings include Patrick Henry Before the Virginia House of Burgesses (1851), now at the Red Hill Patrick Henry National Memorial, and a massive oil painting of the Battle of Gettysburg titled Battle of Gettysburg: Pickett's Charge that hangs in the State Museum of Pennsylvania. This latter work was commissioned by Gettysburg lawyer David McConaughy. Another of his more popular historical works is Columbus Before the Queen, painted in 1844. He was elected as a member to the American Philosophical Society in 1873.

In 1877, he moved from Philadelphia to Grassmere, his country estate near present-day Linfield, Pennsylvania, where he resided until his death. His estate still exists today on Limerick Center Road; it is now a residential site. Rothermel's son, Peter F. Rothermel, Jr., was District Attorney of Philadelphia.

== Gallery of works ==
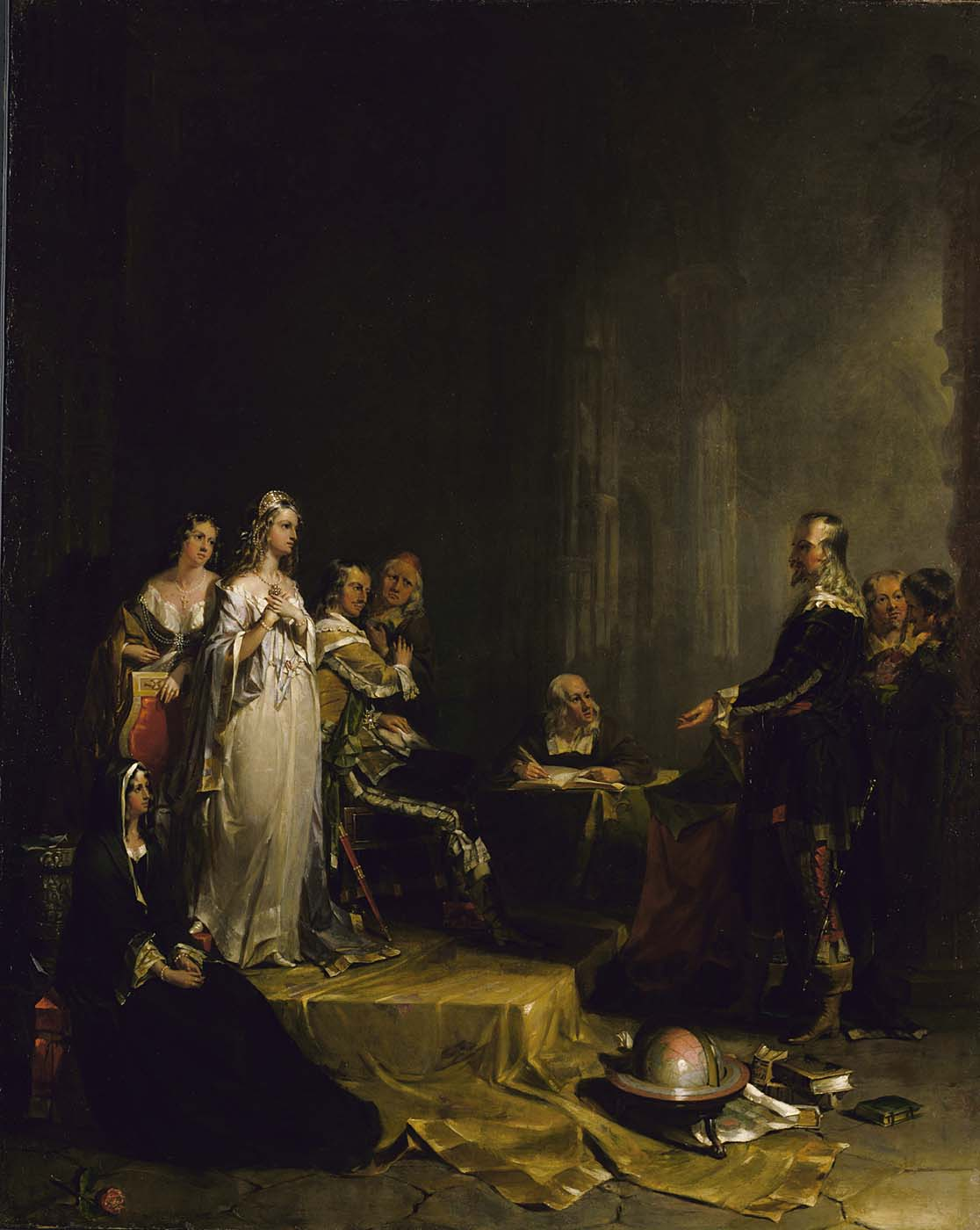
Columbus Before the Queen, 1841

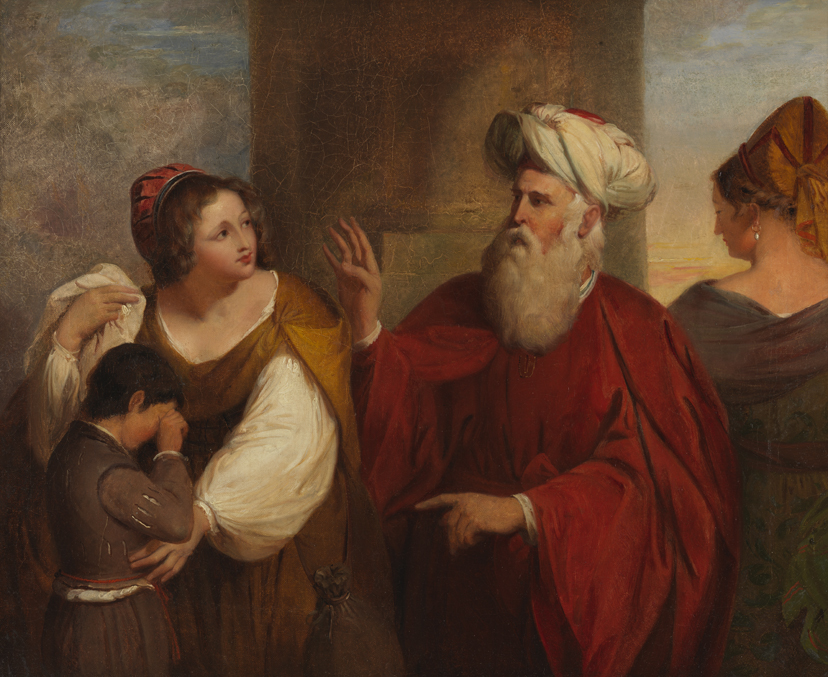
Abraham Casting Out Hagar and Ishmael, 1845

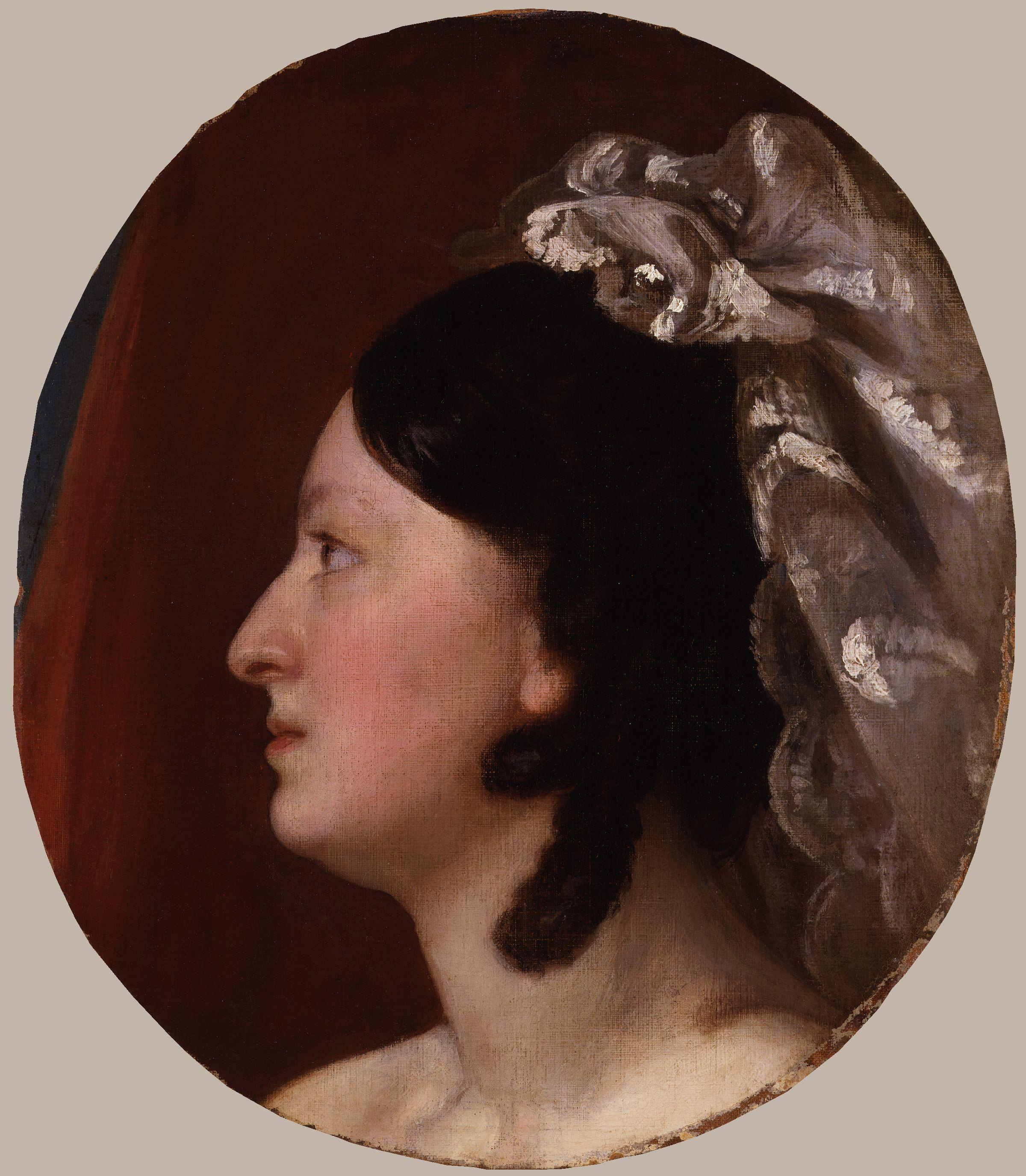
Frances Anne Kemble, 1849

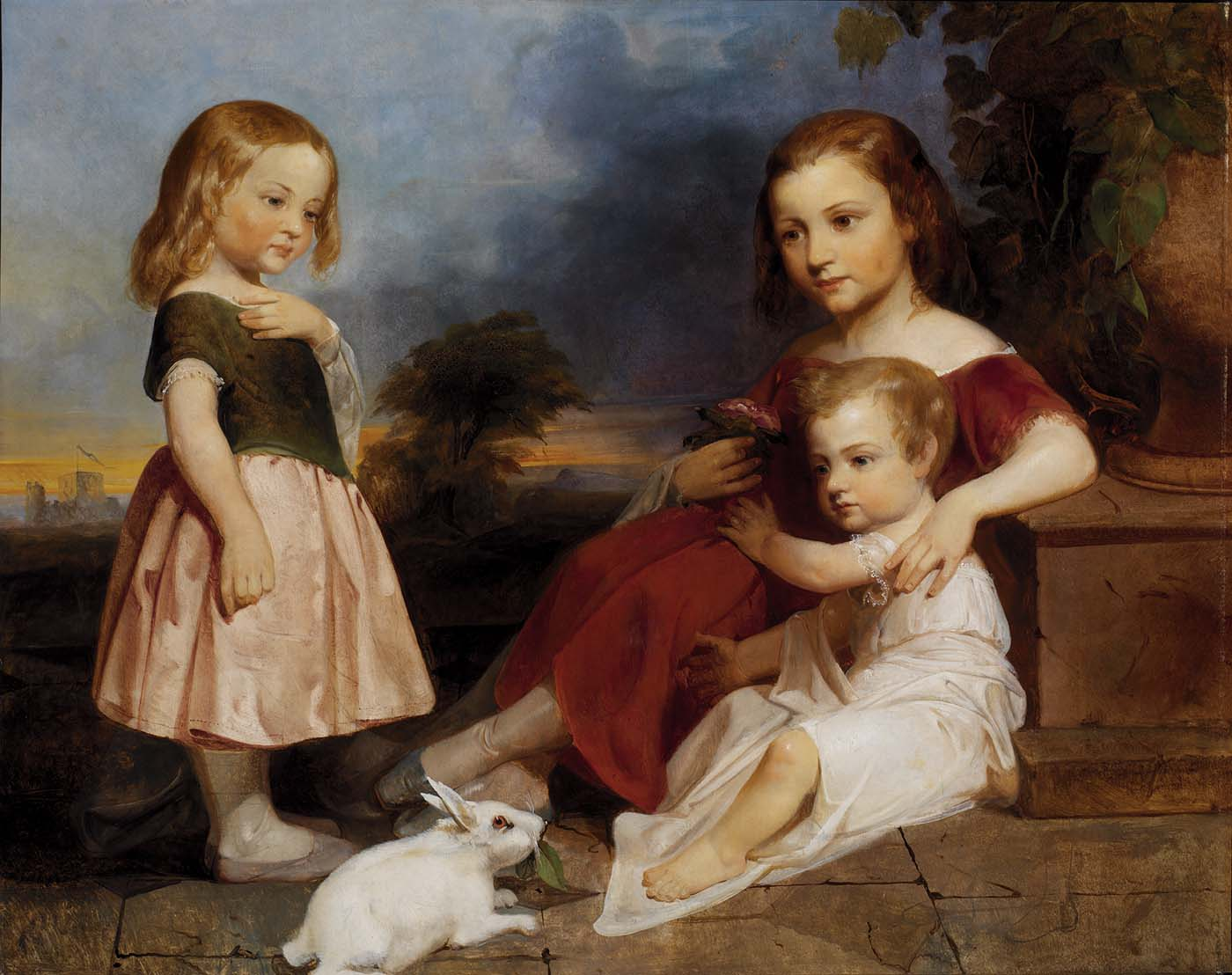
Portrait of the Downer Children, 1850

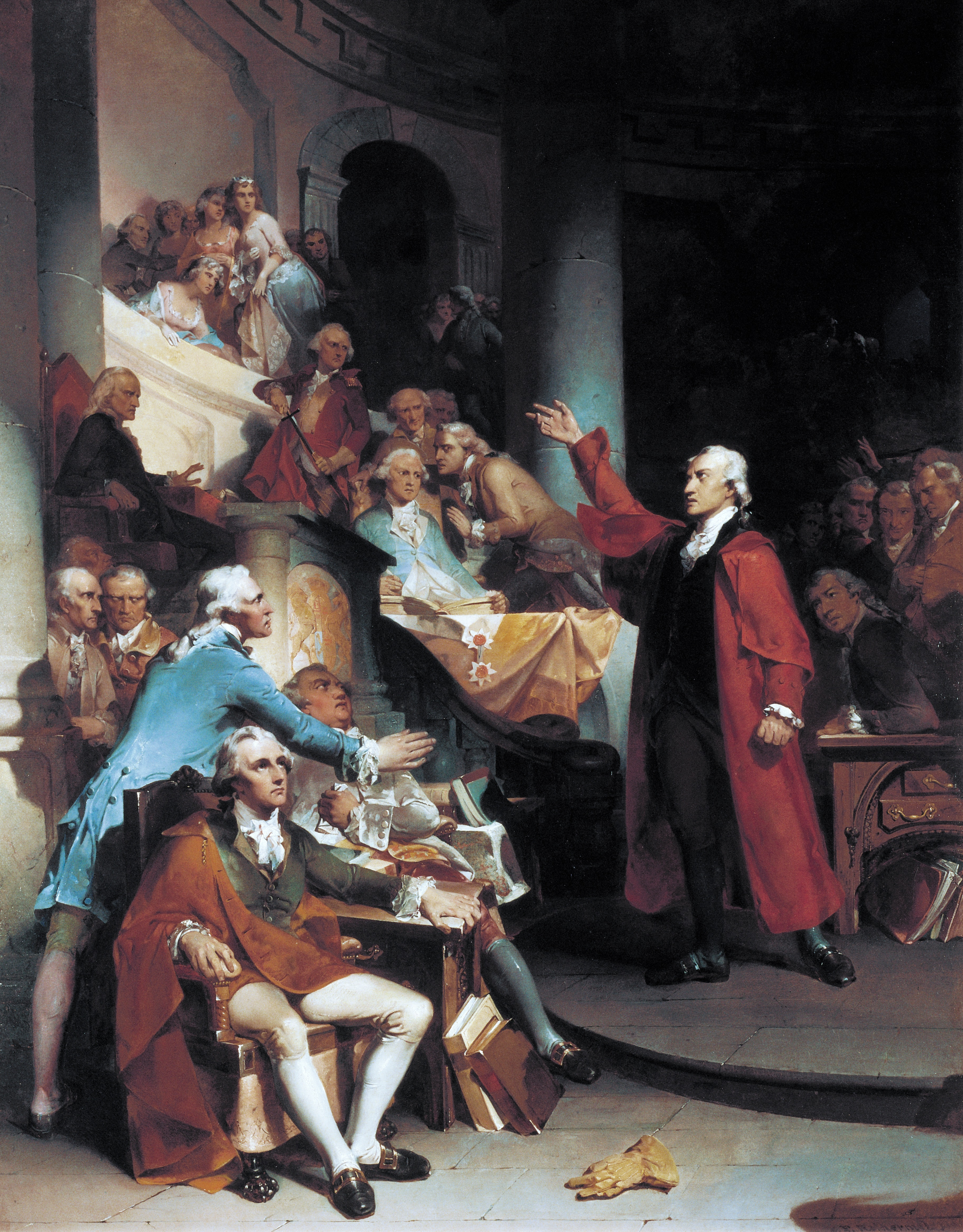
Patrick Henry Before the Virginia House of Burgesses, 1851

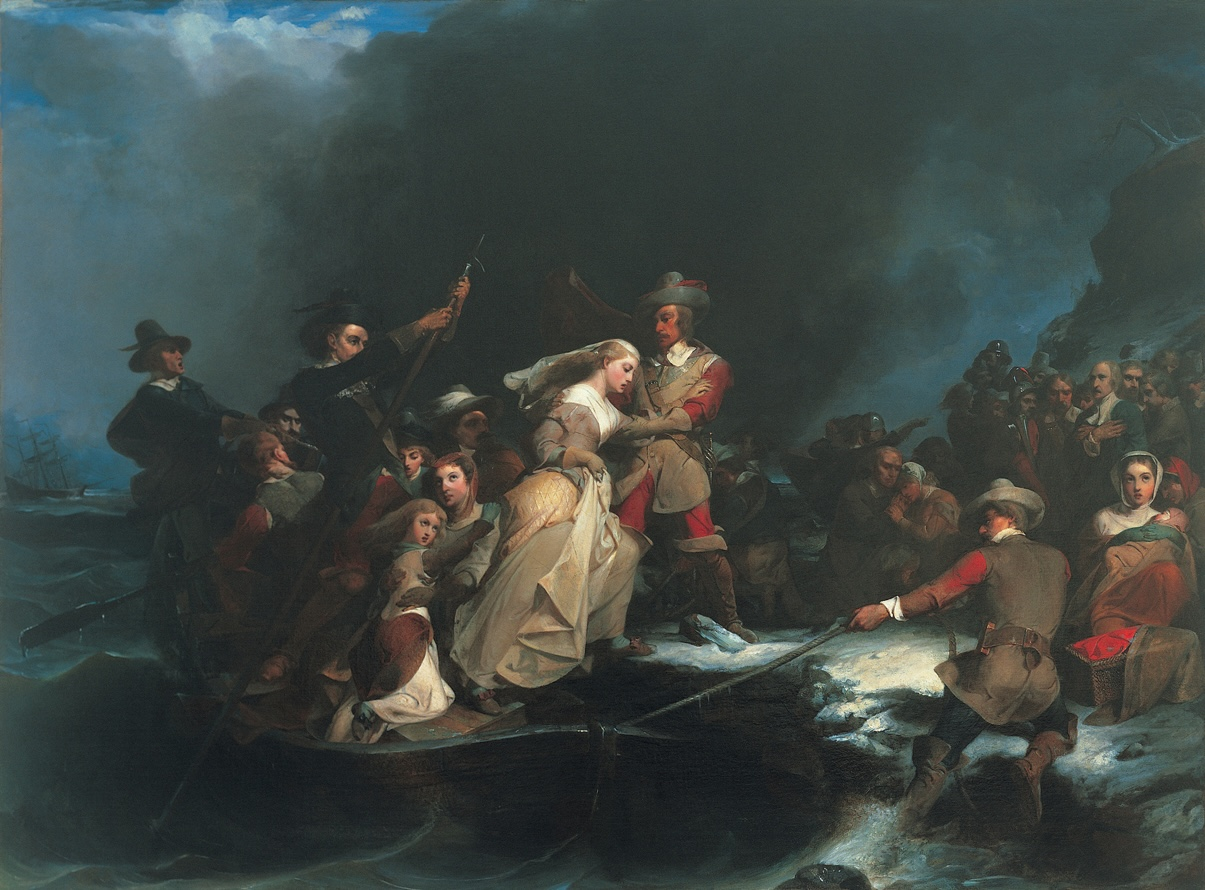
The Landing of the Pilgrims at Plymouth Rock, 1620, 1854

The United States Senate, A.D. 1850, ca. 1855

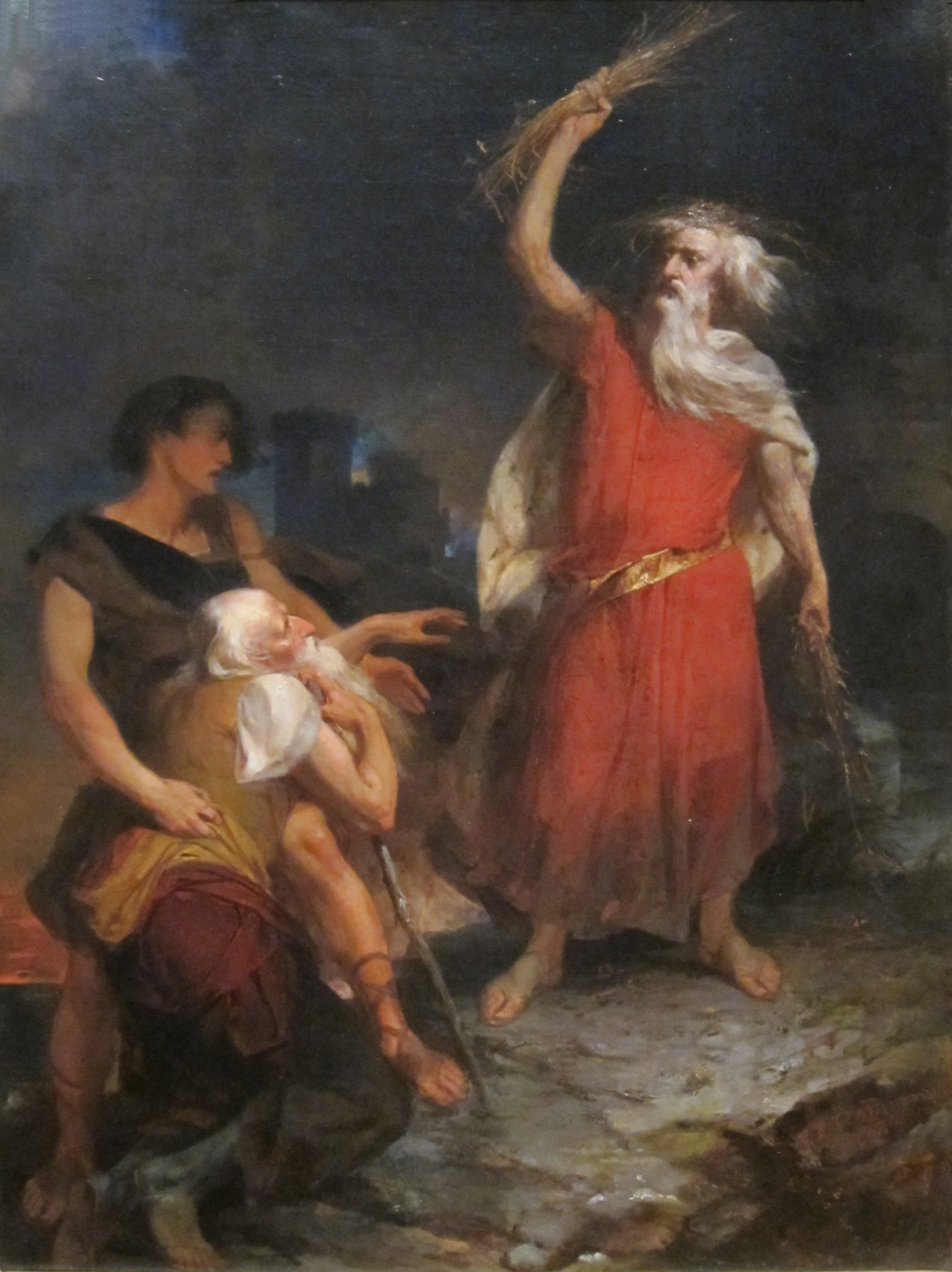
The King and the Beggar, 1856

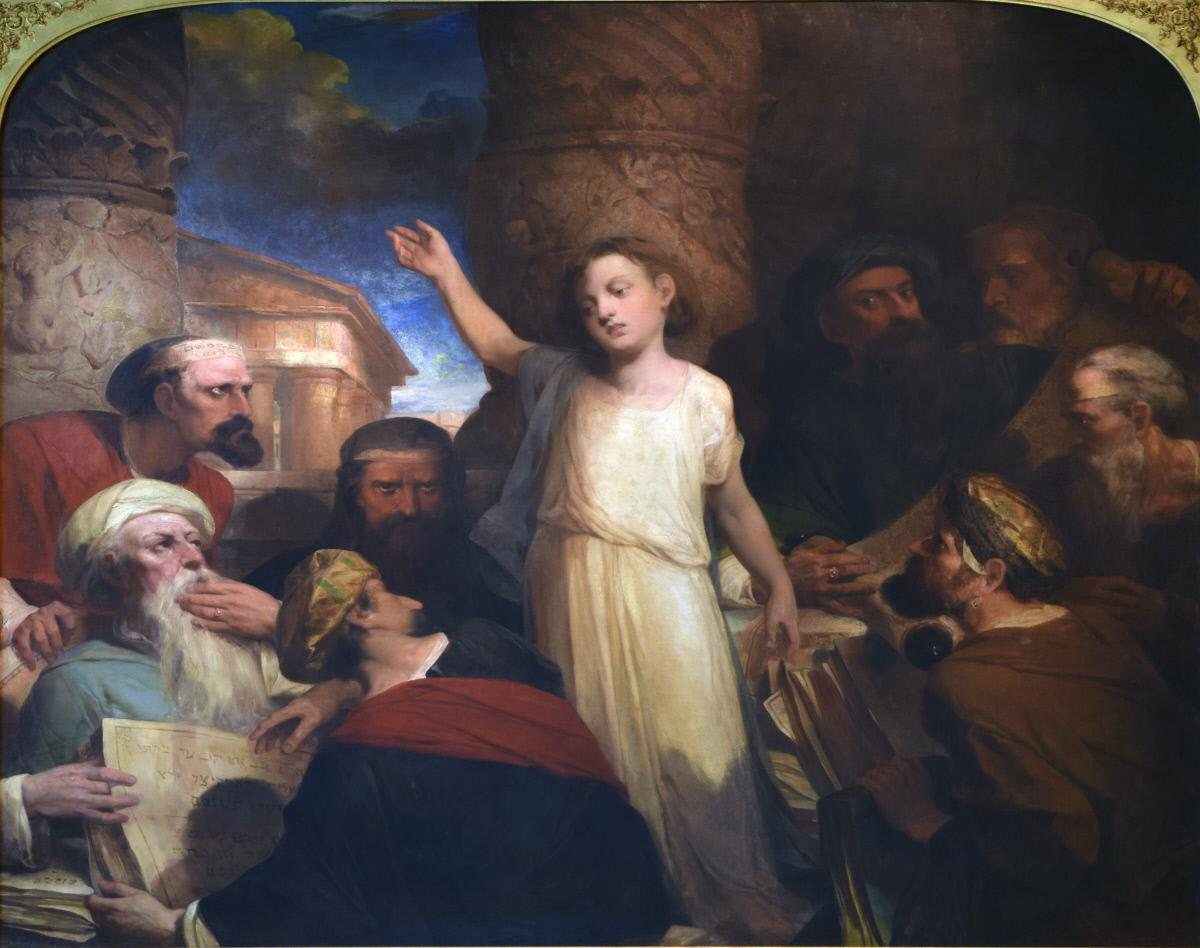
Christ Among the Doctors, 1861

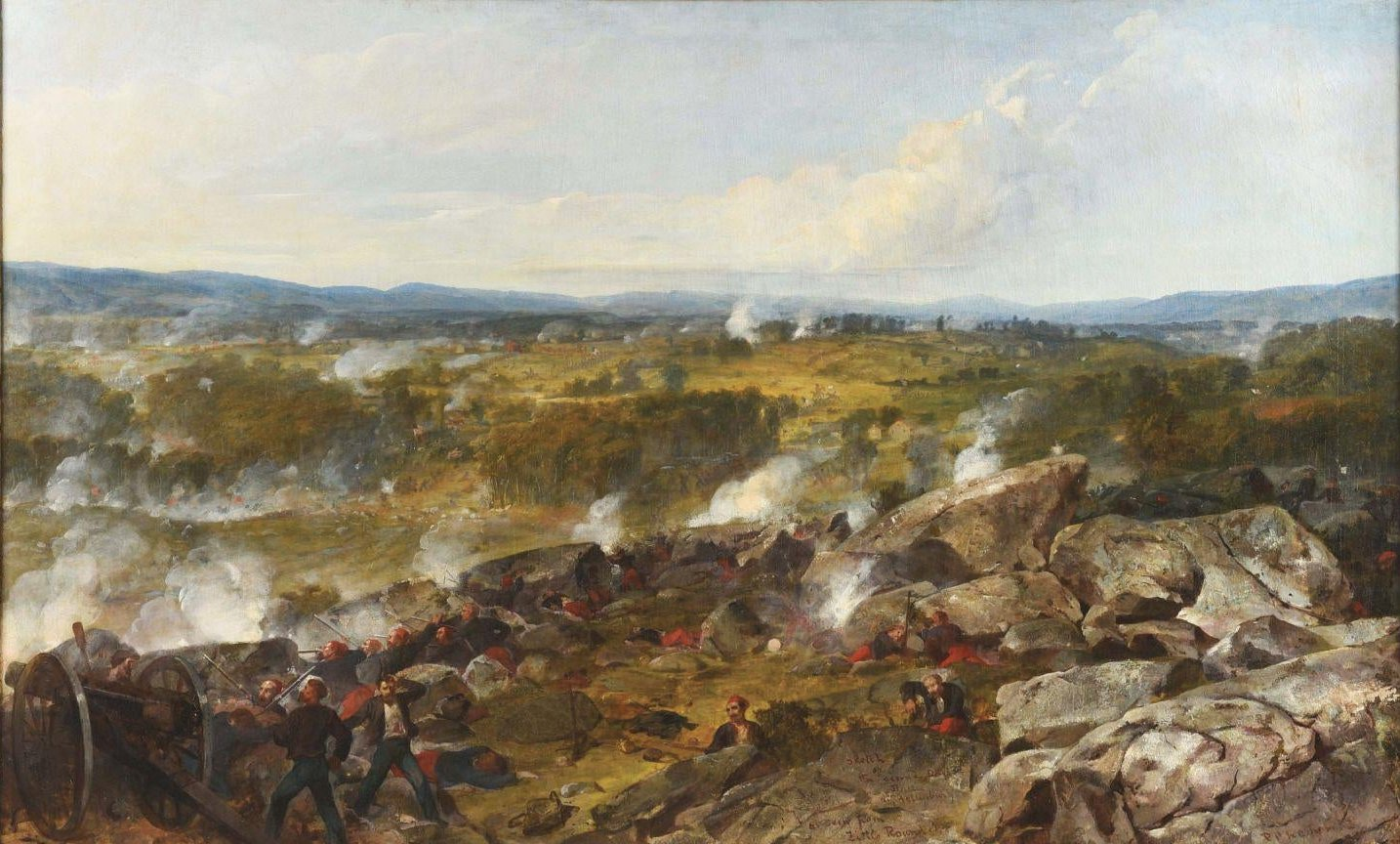
The Battle of Gettysburg, 1870

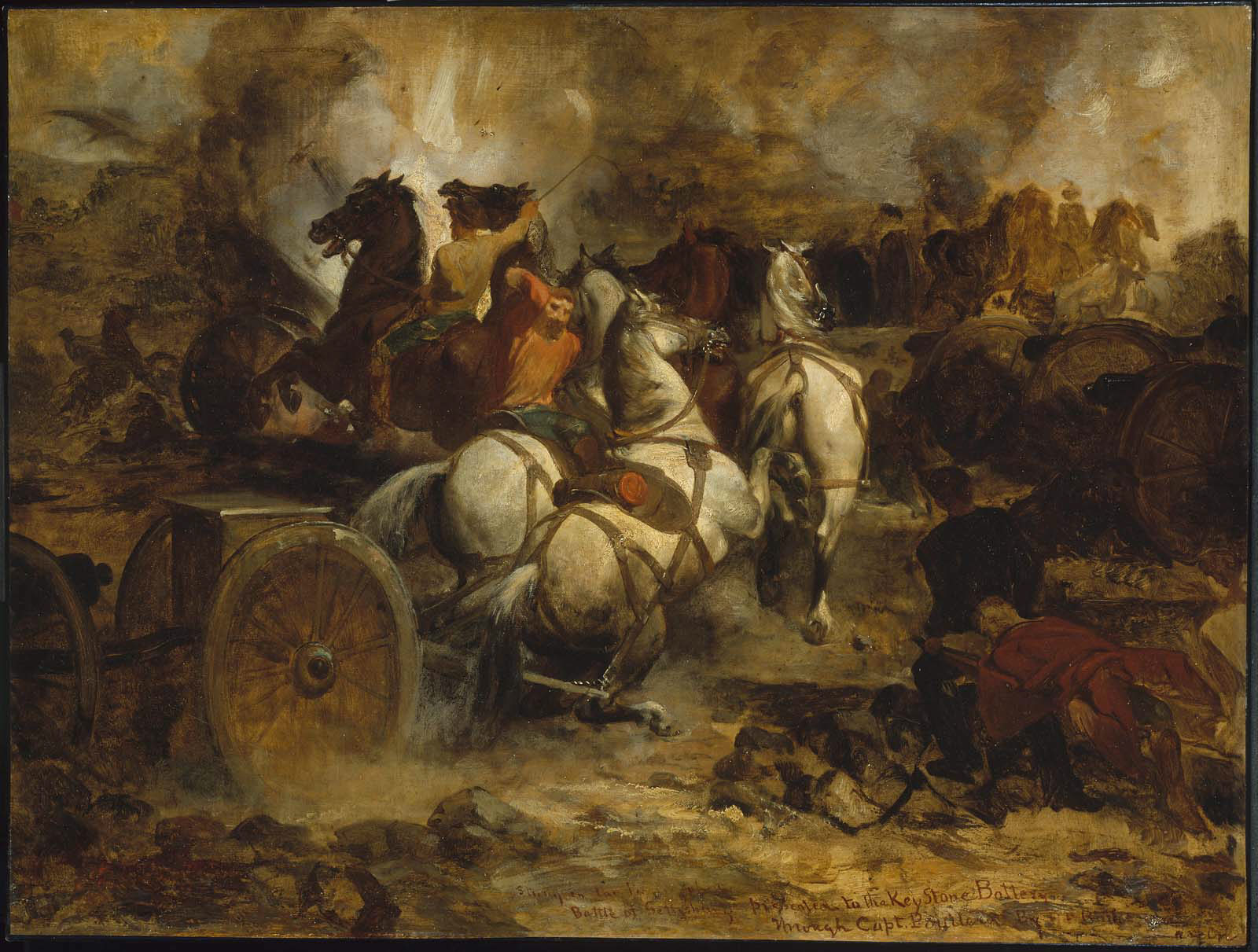
Preliminary study for The Battle of Gettysburg: Pickett's Charge, 1871

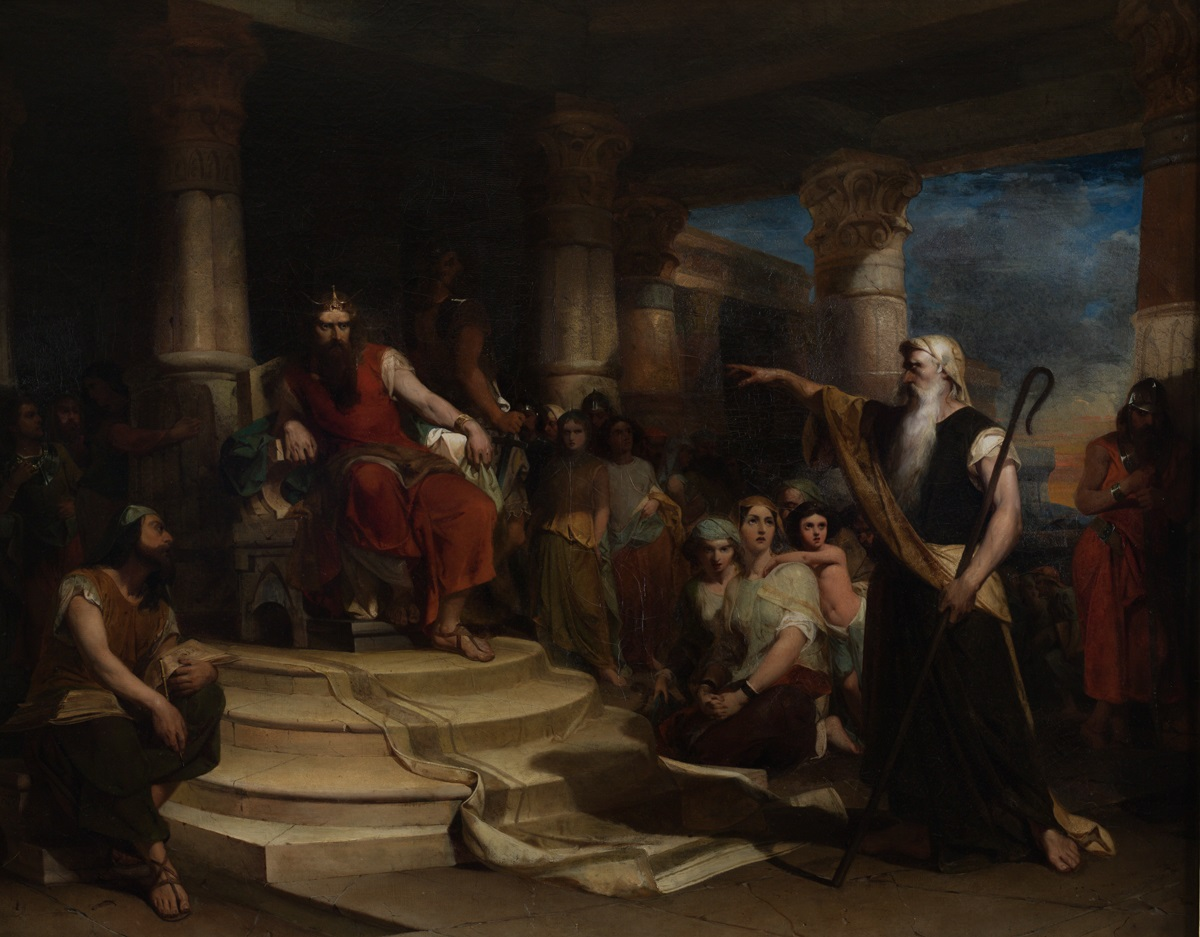
Thou Art the Man, 1884

== Other works ==
Other works of Rothermel include:

- Christabel
- Katherine and Petruchio
- De Soto discovering the Mississippi (1844)
- Embarkation of Columbus
- Christian Martyrs in the Colisseum
- A series of paintings illustrative of William H. Prescott's History of the Conquest of Mexico (about 1850)
- The Virtuoso (1855)
- Vandyke and Rubens (1856)
- St. Agnes (1858)
- Paul at Ephesus
- Paul before Agrippa
- St. Paul preaching on Mars Hill to the Athenians
- Trial of Sir Henry Vane
- The Landsknecht (1876)
- Bacchantes (1884)
