= Fred Risser (Progressive politician) =

20th century American politician

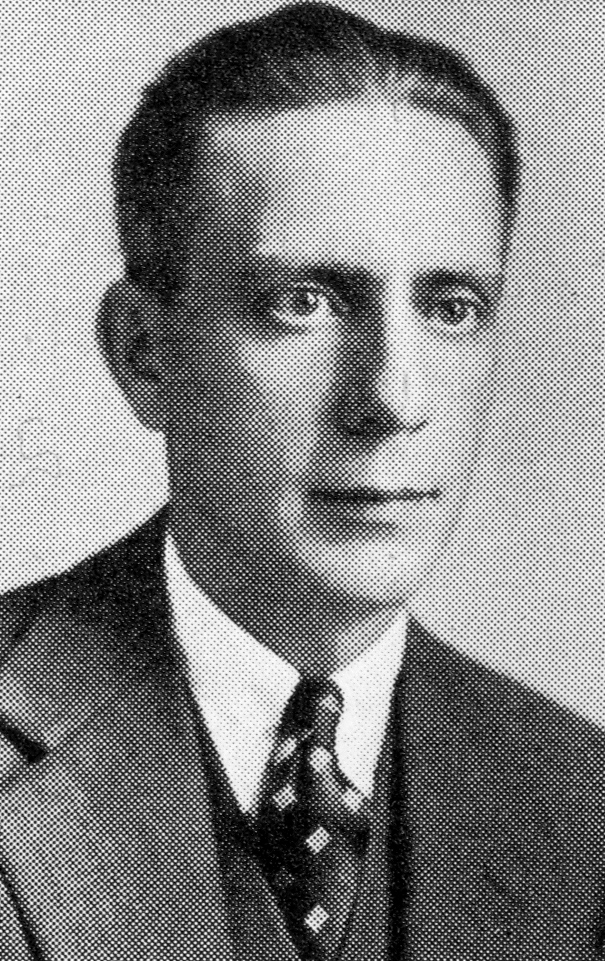

Member of the Wisconsin Senate from the 26th district
- In office January 4, 1937 – January 3, 1949
- Preceded by: Harold Groves
- Succeeded by: Gaylord Nelson

District Attorney of Dane County, Wisconsin
- In office January 7, 1929 – January 7, 1935
- Preceded by: Glenn D. Roberts
- Succeeded by: Lyall T. Beggs

Personal details
- Born: Frederic Emanuel Risser; January 15, 1900 Buffalo, Buffalo County, Wisconsin, U.S.
- Died: September 1, 1971 (aged 71) Madison, Wisconsin, U.S.
- Resting place: Forest Hill Cemetery, Madison, Wisconsin
- Party: Republican; Progressive (1934–1946)
- Spouse: Elizabeth Warner (m. 1926–1971)
- Children: Fred A. Risser^{(b. 1927)}; Andrew W. Risser^{(b. 1929; died 1973)}
- Education: University of Wisconsin–Madison (B.A.); University of Wisconsin Law School (LL.B.)
- Profession: lawyer

Frederic Emanuel Risser (January 15, 1900 – September 1, 1971) was an American lawyer and Progressive politician. He served twelve years as a member of the Wisconsin State Senate from Dane County. He was the father of Wisconsin state senator Fred A. Risser, the longest-serving legislator in American history.

== Early life and education ==
Risser was born in Buffalo, Wisconsin on January 15, 1900. After he graduated from Winona High School in Winona, Minnesota, he spent two years on his father's farm. He then enrolled at the University of Wisconsin–Madison, where he received his bachelor's degree in 1923 and his LL.B. in 1925.

== Career ==
He taught at Beaver Dam High School for one year, and in 1925 became a practicing attorney in Madison, Wisconsin, entering the law firm of and eventually forming a partnership with former state legislator Ernest Warner. From 1925 to 1930, he lectured on business law at Madison College.

=== Wisconsin Senate ===
Before his election to the Senate in 1936, Risser had served as town clerk of the Town of Madison from 1927 to 1928; treasurer of the Highlands Mendota Beach School from 1930 to 1937; was three times elected district attorney of Dane County as a Republican, and in 1933 was president of the Wisconsin District Attorney's Association. From 1925 to 1930 he lectured on business law at Madison Area Technical College.

In 1936, Risser was elected to the 26th Senate District (Dane County) by a wide margin in the general election, after winning a plurality in a three-way Progressive Party primary (Progressive incumbent Harold Groves was not a candidate). He was re-elected in 1940 and 1944; but by 1948 the Wisconsin Progressives had merged back into the Republican Party, and (after having to face a challenge in the Republican primary from a non-Progressive), Risser was defeated for re-election in a four-way race by Gaylord Nelson.

After leaving the Senate, Risser continued to practice law.

Risser was a delegate to the 1952 Republican National Convention from Wisconsin's 2nd congressional district, arriving at the convention pledged to Earl Warren.

Rissler died on September 1, 1971.

== Personal life ==
Fred Risser married Elizabeth Warner, the daughter of his senior law partner Ernest Warner.

Their son, Fred A. Risser, went on to serve six years in the Wisconsin State Assembly (1957–1962) and 58 years in the Wisconsin State Senate (1962–2021), making him the longest-serving state legislator in American history.

== Electoral history ==
=== Wisconsin Senate (1936–1948) ===
Year	Election	Date	Elected				Defeated				Total	Plurality
1936	Primary	Sep. 15	Fred Risser	Progressive	4,820	45.66%	Gena Thompson	Prog.	3,149	29.83%	10,557	1,671
1936	Primary	Sep. 15	Fred Risser	Progressive	4,820	45.66%	H. Paul Harris	Prog.	2,588	24.51%	10,557	1,671
1936	General	Nov. 3	Fred Risser	Progressive	32,591	69.86%	Robert Caldwell	Rep.	14,058	30.14%	46,649	18,533
1940	Primary	Sep. 17	Fred Risser (inc.)	Progressive	11,704	72.23%	Darrell MacIntyre	Prog.	4,499	27.77%	16,203	7,205
1940	General	Nov. 5	Fred Risser (inc.)	Progressive	35,952	60.80%	Arthur May	Rep.	18,338	31.01%	59,130	17,614
1940	General	Nov. 5	Fred Risser (inc.)	Progressive	35,952	60.80%	George P. Gaffney	Dem.	4,840	8.19%	59,130	17,614
1944	General	Nov. 7	Fred Risser (inc.)	Progressive	25,488	45.88%	Anthony J. Fiore	Rep.	20,018	36.04%	55,549	5,470
1944	General	Nov. 7	Fred Risser (inc.)	Progressive	25,488	45.88%	George Schlotthauer	Dem.	9,813	17.67%	55,549	5,470
1944	General	Nov. 7	Fred Risser (inc.)	Progressive	25,488	45.88%	John Sikkema	Soc.	230	0.41%	55,549	5,470
1948	Primary	Sep. 21	Fred Risser (inc.)	Republican	17,672	70.33%	Anthony J. Fiore	Rep.	7,456	29.67%	25,128	10,216
1948	General	Nov. 2	Gaylord Nelson	Democratic	30,398	50.85%	Fred Risser (inc.)	Rep.	28,729	48.06%	59,777	1,669
1948	General	Nov. 2	Gaylord Nelson	Democratic	30,398	50.85%	Nathan Sadowsky	Soc.	360	0.60%	59,777	1,669
1948	General	Nov. 2	Gaylord Nelson	Democratic	30,398	50.85%	Lawrence G. Grab	Prog.	290	0.49%	59,777	1,669

Wisconsin Senate
Preceded by Harold Groves	Member of the Wisconsin Senate from the 26th district January 4, 1937 – January 3, 1949	Succeeded by Gaylord Nelson
Legal offices
Preceded by Glenn D. Roberts	District Attorney of Dane County, Wisconsin; January 7, 1929 – January 7, 1935	Succeeded by Lyall T. Beggs
