= National Register of Historic Places listings in Iowa County, Wisconsin =

Location of Iowa County in Wisconsin

This is a list of the National Register of Historic Places listings in Iowa County, Wisconsin. It is intended to provide a comprehensive listing of entries in the National Register of Historic Places that are located in Iowa County, Wisconsin. The locations of National Register properties for which the latitude and longitude coordinates are included below may be seen in a map.

There are 41 properties and districts listed on the National Register in the county.

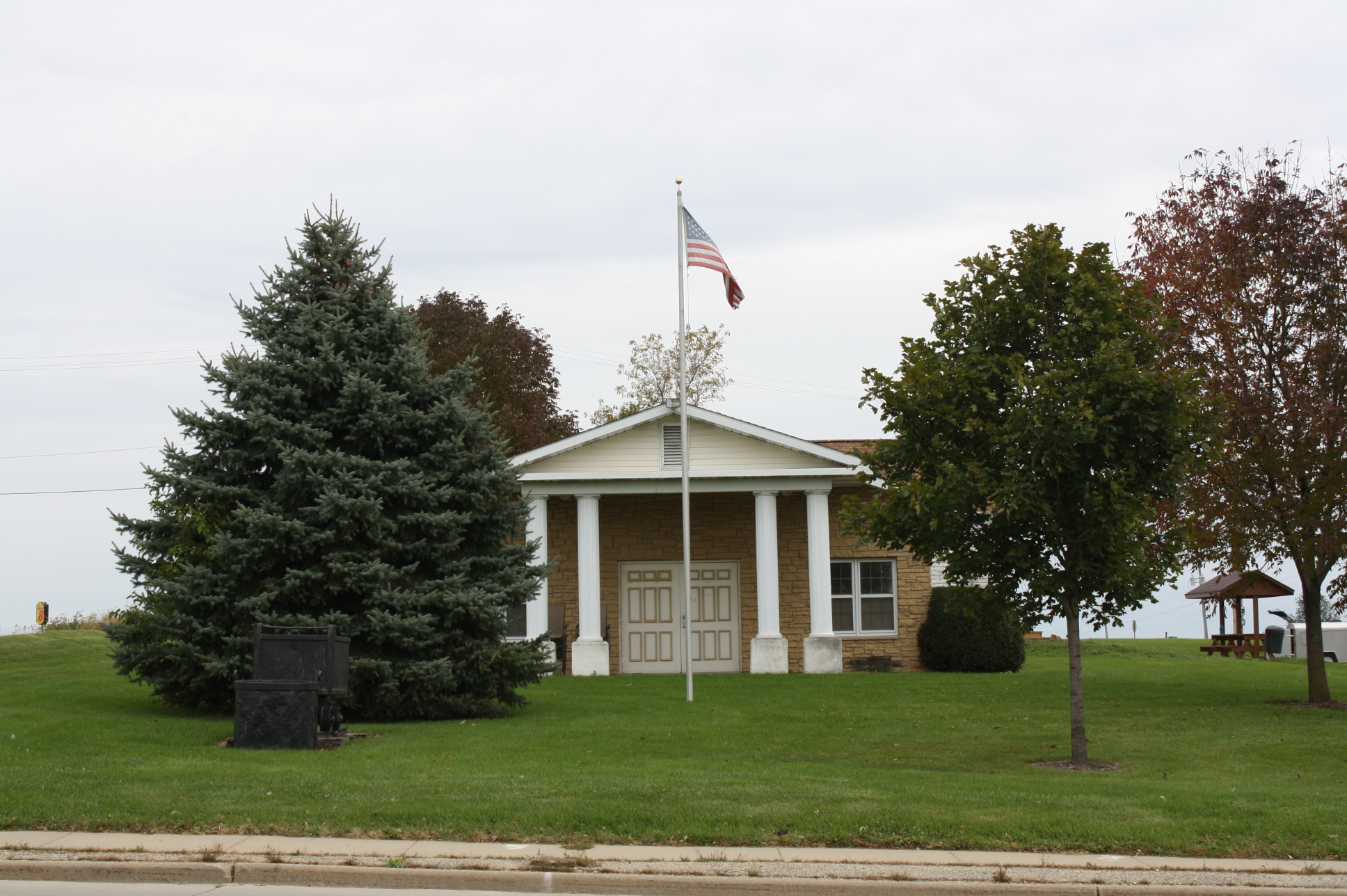
Iowa County Historical Society building in Dodgeville

This National Park Service list is complete through NPS recent listings posted July 10, 2026.

== Current listings ==
	Name on the Register	Image	Date listed	Location	City or town	Description
1	Archeological Site No. 47Ia167	Archeological Site No. 47Ia167	August 21, 1992 (#92001026)	Address Restricted	Brigham	
2	Archeological Site No. 47Ia168	Archeological Site No. 47Ia168	August 21, 1992 (#92001025)	Address Restricted	Brigham	
3	William Henry Brisbane House	William Henry Brisbane House	September 13, 1990 (#90001458)	Reimann Rd., .6 mi. S of US 14; 43°09′12″N 89°54′33″W	Arena	Unusual (for Wisconsin) 2.5 story Gothic Revival-styled I-house, built in 1868 for Brisbane, a former South Carolina slave owner who became a nationally prominent abolitionist.
4	Carden Rockshelter	Carden Rockshelter	August 5, 1993 (#93000808)	Address Restricted	Brigham	
5	Cassidy Farmhouse	Cassidy Farmhouse	September 29, 1986 (#86002297)	Off WI K N of US 18/151; 43°01′26″N 89°53′23″W	Barneveld	2-story Greek Revival-styled house with walls of locally-quarried limestone, built in 1860. Henry and Sarah Cassidy were early settlers in Barneveld.
6	DNR No. 4 Rockshelter	DNR No. 4 Rockshelter	January 30, 1991 (#90002156)	Address Restricted	Brigham	
7	DNR No. 5 Archeological Site	DNR No. 5 Archeological Site	May 21, 1992 (#92000592)	Address Restricted	Brigham	
8	Dodge Mining Camp Cabin	Dodge Mining Camp Cabin	September 1, 2005 (#05000952)	205 E. Fountain St. 42°57′32″N 90°07′44″W	Dodgeville	Settlement-era log cabin built in 1827, possibly by Henry Dodge, who led one of the first lead-mining parties into the area. Remodeled in the 1840s with clapboard siding and trim.
9	Drohman Cabin		September 28, 1981 (#81000037)	Helena Rd. 43°10′42″N 90°01′04″W	Arena	1.5-story cabin built around 1850, with some walls built of hand-hewn oak logs joined by dovetail notches - a German style. Other walls are wattle-and-daub, which is very unusual in Wisconsin. Moved from Madison in 1989.
10	Gottschall Site (47Ia80)	Gottschall Site (47Ia80)	June 30, 1983 (#83003399)	Address Restricted	Highland	Sandstone rockshelter where rituals were performed from at least 500 B.C. to 1100 A.D. Artifacts include a painted sandstone head and a rock painting which seems to depict Red Horn, a Ho-Chunk hero.
11	Grove Street Historic District	Grove Street Historic District	September 29, 1986 (#86002313)	304-316 Grove St. 43°00′59″N 89°53′58″W	Barneveld	Group of six modest homes and landscaping which survived the Barneveld tornado of 1984, giving a sample of how Barneveld looked before the disaster. They are the 1901 Osborn house (pictured at left), the 1901 Peterson house, the 1910 Doescher house, the 1910 Manteufel house, the 1910 Carden house, and the 1925 Vollen bungalow.
12	Harris House	Harris House	September 29, 1986 (#86002299)	202 W. Wood St. 43°00′57″N 89°53′54″W	Barneveld	Queen Anne home with unusual lintels above the windows, built around 1890 by the owner of the local lumberyard, in hopes of renting rooms to visitors to a local mineral spring.
13	Hole-in-the-Wall No. 1 Cave	Hole-in-the-Wall No. 1 Cave	January 30, 1991 (#90002157)	Address Restricted	Brigham	
14	Hyde Chapel	Hyde Chapel	October 13, 1988 (#88002002)	1 mi. S of CTH H on CTH T 43°04′16″N 89°57′56″W	Ridgeway	Wooden Greek Revival-styled rural church built in 1862 by English and Welsh settlers. Also the cemetery, with burials older than the building.
15	Ihm House	Ihm House	September 29, 1986 (#86002301)	203 N. Garfield St. 43°00′59″N 89°53′44″W	Barneveld	Ornate Queen Anne cottage built around 1891 by Fred Lampop, who owned a livery stable and farm machine business.
16	Iowa County Courthouse	Iowa County Courthouse	February 1, 1972 (#72000053)	SW corner of Iowa and Chapel Sts. 42°57′41″N 90°07′51″W	Dodgeville	Temple-style Greek Revival courthouse, designed by Ernest Wiesen of Mineral Point and built in 1859 of locally-quarried limestone by Cornish stoneworkers. Additions followed in 1893, 1927, etc. Oldest continuously used courthouse in Wisconsin.
17	Iowa Street Historic District	Iowa Street Historic District	September 6, 1996 (#96000991)	Roughly, Iowa St. from Division St. to Diagonal St. 42°57′40″N 90°07′49″W	Dodgeville	Dodgeville's old downtown, including the 1859 Greek Revival Iowa County Courthouse, the 1888 Italianate-styled Ford hardware store, the 1901 Queen Anne Auditorium (opera house), the 1919 Neoclassical-styled First National Bank, the 1922 Commercial Craftsman Pollard harness shop, and the 1940 Art Deco Commonwealth Telephone Company.
18	David J. and Maggie Jones House	David J. and Maggie Jones House	May 19, 1994 (#94000447)	201 E. Swayne St. (now 1121 Professional Dr.); 42°58′18″N 90°07′41″W	Dodgeville	Italianate-styled frame house built in 1878 for J.C. Hocking, Cornish immigrant, miner and businessman. Occupied from 1879 by David J. Jones, Welsh immigrant, Civil War veteran, miner, and real estate speculator.
19	Kittleson House	Kittleson House	September 29, 1986 (#86002304)	104 W. Wood St. 43°00′59″N 89°53′50″W	Barneveld	American Foursquare house with Queen-Anne-ish decorative shinglework in the dormers, built in 1911 for William Dagenhardt, who owned a warehouse.
20	Linden High School	Linden High School	November 4, 1993 (#93001168)	344 E. Main St. 42°54′56″N 90°16′07″W	Linden	2-story brick high school designed by H.T. Liebert of Antigo in German Renaissance Revival style and built by Thomas Cretney of Ridgeville in 1913, when zinc-mining was booming in Linden. Grades 1-8 resided on the first floor, high school on the 2nd, and a science lab on 3rd. Razed in 1995.
21	Linden Methodist Church	Linden Methodist Church	October 19, 1978 (#78000099)	Main and Church Sts. 42°55′03″N 90°16′26″W	Linden	Limestone-block church designed by Thomas Blake and built by Cornish masons for the Methodist congregation in 1851. In 1870 they added a pine and walnut balcony around three walls inside, and around 1877 the steeple.
22	Mayland Cave	Mayland Cave	December 22, 1978 (#78000100)	Address Restricted	Dodgeville	
23	McCoy Rock Art Site	McCoy Rock Art Site	April 19, 1991 (#91000467)	Address Restricted	Moscow	
24	Mineral Point Hill	Mineral Point Hill	October 26, 1972 (#72000054)	Roughly bounded by WI 23, Copper, Dodge, and Shake Rag Sts. 42°51′36″N 90°10′16″W	Mineral Point	Hill across from Shake Rag Street where most of Mineral Point's lead was mined from 1830 to 1855. Also the site of the Merry Christmas zinc mine, opened around 1906.
25	Mineral Point Historic District	Mineral Point Historic District	July 30, 1971 (#71000037)	Roughly bounded by Ross, Shake Rag, 9th, and Bend Sts. 42°51′54″N 90°10′37″W	Mineral Point	Historic part of the early lead-mining community and Wisconsin's 3rd oldest city, including limestone cottages on Shake Rag Street built by Cornish lead miners in the 1830s and 40s, the 1838 Greek Revival Odd Fellows Hall, the 1839 Greek Revival Moses Strong house, the 1845 Gothic Revival Trinity Episcopal church, the 1849 Boomtown style Washburn and Woodman Bank, the c. 1850 Federal style Wade house, the 1856 Depot, and the 1878 Mineral Springs Brewery.
26	Old Rock School	Old Rock School	December 18, 1978 (#78000101)	914 Bequette St. 42°58′07″N 90°07′59″W	Dodgeville	2-story school built of coursed limestone rubble by Cornish immigrant Thomas Carkeek in 1853 - one of Dodgeville's first two permanent schools. Converted to a residence in 1882, and restored to historical form around 1970.
27	Pendarvis	Pendarvis	January 25, 1971 (#71000038)	114 Shake Rag St. 42°51′50″N 90°10′21″W	Mineral Point	Three cottages of early lead-miners, built of local limestone in the 1840s, facing the hill where they mined. Pendarvis is the name of one, which resembles a Cornish cottage. Restored starting in 1935, and now a historical museum.
28	Plum Grove Primitive Methodist Church	Plum Grove Primitive Methodist Church	April 27, 1995 (#95000505)	Co. Rd. BB, 0.7 mi. S of jct. with US 18/151; 42°58′04″N 90°01′11″W	Ridgeway	Small Gothic Revival-style church, built in 1882 by a Methodist faction which split off over whether an organ should accompany the choir. Re-used as a community hall in 1934.
29	Pulaski Presbyterian Church Complex	Pulaski Presbyterian Church Complex	May 22, 2013 (#13000313)	6757 County Road P 43°08′26″N 90°24′14″W	Pulaski	Wooden Gothic Revival-styled church, built in 1874 by the rural Presbyterian congregation to replace an earlier log church. Also the wooden schoolhouse built in 1901.
30	Rainbow Cave		June 23, 1995 (#95000761)	Address Restricted	Barneveld	Includes a human (female?) figure in dark pigment carrying something represented by a stack of five grooves in the sandstone.
31	Roberts House	Roberts House	September 1, 1988 (#86002311)	302 Front St. 43°01′04″N 89°53′47″W	Barneveld	1.5-story bungalow designed and built around 1920 by John Lewis.
32	Roethlisberger House	Roethlisberger House	September 29, 1986 (#86002312)	205 N. Grove St. 43°00′53″N 89°53′54″W	Barneveld	Gabled-ell house with Queen Ann-styled windows and decorative shingles, probably constructed in the 1880s.
33	Sawle Mound Group Archeological District	Sawle Mound Group Archeological District	June 7, 1991 (#91000672)	Address Restricted	Arena	
34	Shiprock Rockshelter	Shiprock Rockshelter	May 21, 1992 (#92000591)	Address Restricted; 43°08′45″N 90°17′21″W	Pulaski	
35	Shot Tower	Shot Tower	April 3, 1973 (#73000080)	SE of Spring Green in Tower Hill State Park; 43°09′01″N 90°02′48″W	Spring Green	Reconstructed 1831 shot tower where regionally mined lead was manufactured into lead shot.
36	Spensley Farm	Spensley Farm	April 14, 1997 (#97000330)	1126 WI QQ, E of jct. with WI 39; 42°52′07″N 90°12′04″W	Mineral Point	Center of operations of British immigrant James Spensley, including the site of his lead-smelting furnace, his Italianate-styled limestone house built in the 1850s, the barn where he bred cattle, his spring house, and ruins of various other structures.
37	Spring Green Restaurant	Spring Green Restaurant	February 8, 2024 (#100009939)	5607 County Highway C 43°08′38″N 90°03′34″W	Wyoming	Frank Lloyd Wright designed his Riverview Terrace to serve as a restaurant for visitors to Taliesen. Construction started in 1957, paused after Wright's death in 1959, and resumed in 1966 under direction of William Wesley Peters. It operated from 1967 to 1993 as Spring Green Restaurant, when it became the Frank Lloyd Wright Visitor Center.
38	Taliesin	Taliesin	April 14, 1973 (#73000081)	2 mi. S of Spring Green on WI 23; 43°08′26″N 90°04′22″W	Spring Green	Home, studio and farm complex of architect Frank Lloyd Wright, built in 1911 and rebuilt and modified after fires and Wright's new ideas. Includes Wright's home, the 1902 Hillside Home School, the 1938 Midway Farms, and the 1896 Romeo and Juliet Windmill.
39	Thomas Stone Barn	Thomas Stone Barn	March 29, 2001 (#01000299)	7777 WI 18-151; 43°00′29″N 89°55′23″W	Brigham	Largely intact barn built around 1881 for Welshman Walter Thomas, with high limestone walls and gable roof, originally built for sheltering stock and hay, and later adapted for dairying.
40	Unity Chapel	Unity Chapel	July 18, 1974 (#74000092)	S of Spring Green off WI 23; 43°07′57″N 90°03′39″W	Spring Green	1886 Shingle style chapel designed by Joseph Lyman Silsbee, with assistance from his protege Frank Lloyd Wright, for Wright's Unitarian minister uncle Jenkin Lloyd Jones.
41	Wyoming Valley School	Wyoming Valley School	June 14, 2016 (#16000377)	6306 WI 23; 43°07′07″N 90°06′49″W	Wyoming	Two-room grade school, designed by Frank Lloyd Wright and built in 1957 in the valley where Wright spent summers as a boy. Now serves as a local cultural center.

== See also ==
- List of National Historic Landmarks in Wisconsin
- National Register of Historic Places listings in Wisconsin
- Listings in neighboring counties: Dane, Grant, Green, Lafayette, Richland, Sauk
