= Drohman Cabin =

Historic house in Wisconsin, United States

- U.S. National Register of Historic Places
- Location: off Helena Road, Arena, Iowa County, Wisconsin
- Coordinates: 43°10′42″N 90°1′4″W
- Built: about 1850
- NRHP reference No.: 81000037
- Added to NRHP: September 28, 1981

The Drohman Cabin is a 1 1/2-story log cabin built about 1850 in Madison, Wisconsin, United States. The main structure was made of hand-hewn oak logs joined by German-style dovetail joints. Interior walls are wattle-and-daub, which is unusual in Wisconsin. It was listed on the National Register of Historic Places in 1981. In 1989, it was moved near the Wisconsin River and Helena, Wisconsin, in Iowa County.
