= Plum Grove Primitive Methodist Church =

Historic church in Wisconsin, United States

- U.S. National Register of Historic Places
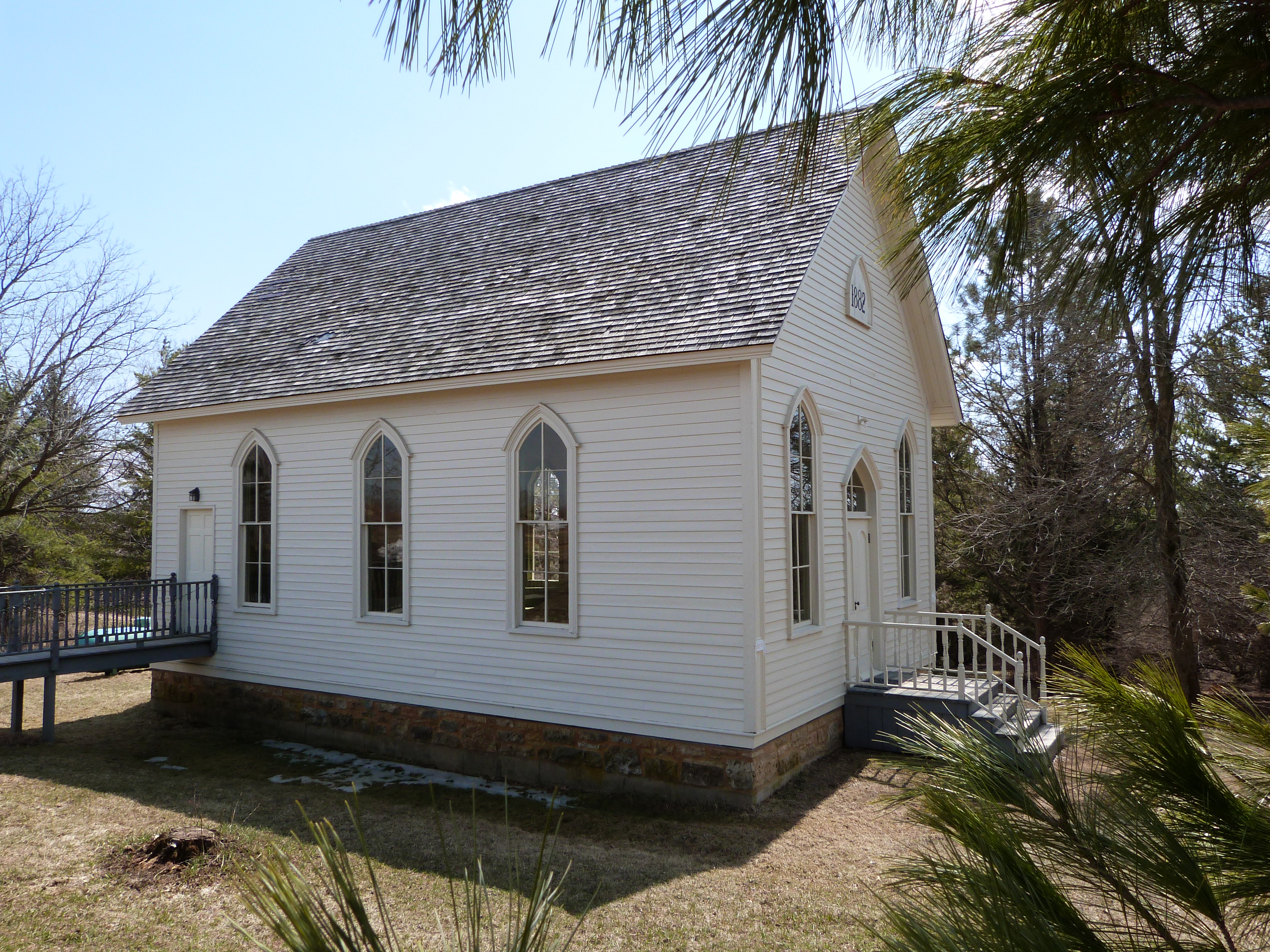

- Location within Wisconsin
- Location: Co. Rd. BB; Ridgeway, Wisconsin
- Coordinates: 42°58′04″N 90°01′11″W
- Built: 1882
- Architectural style: Gothic Revival
- NRHP reference No.: 95000505
- Added to NRHP: April 27, 1995

The Plum Grove Primitive Methodist Church is a historic church on County Trunk Highway BB in Ridgeway, Wisconsin. The church was built in 1882 for a newly formed Methodist congregation, an outgrowth of the large Methodist community in Mineral Point. In the 19th century, both Mineral Point and Iowa County as a whole had a large Cornish immigrant population who came to the area to work in its lead and zinc mines; as the immigrants were predominantly Methodist, they build many new Methodist churches for their congregations. The Plum Grove church is a one-story Gothic Revival wood frame structure with board siding, an arched entrance and windows, and a gable roof. The church changed its affiliation to the Congregational Church in 1913, and regular services in the 1882 building stopped around the same time. The Plum Grove community converted the building to a community center in the 1930s and used it for local events until the 1970s.

The church was added to the National Register of Historic Places in 1995.

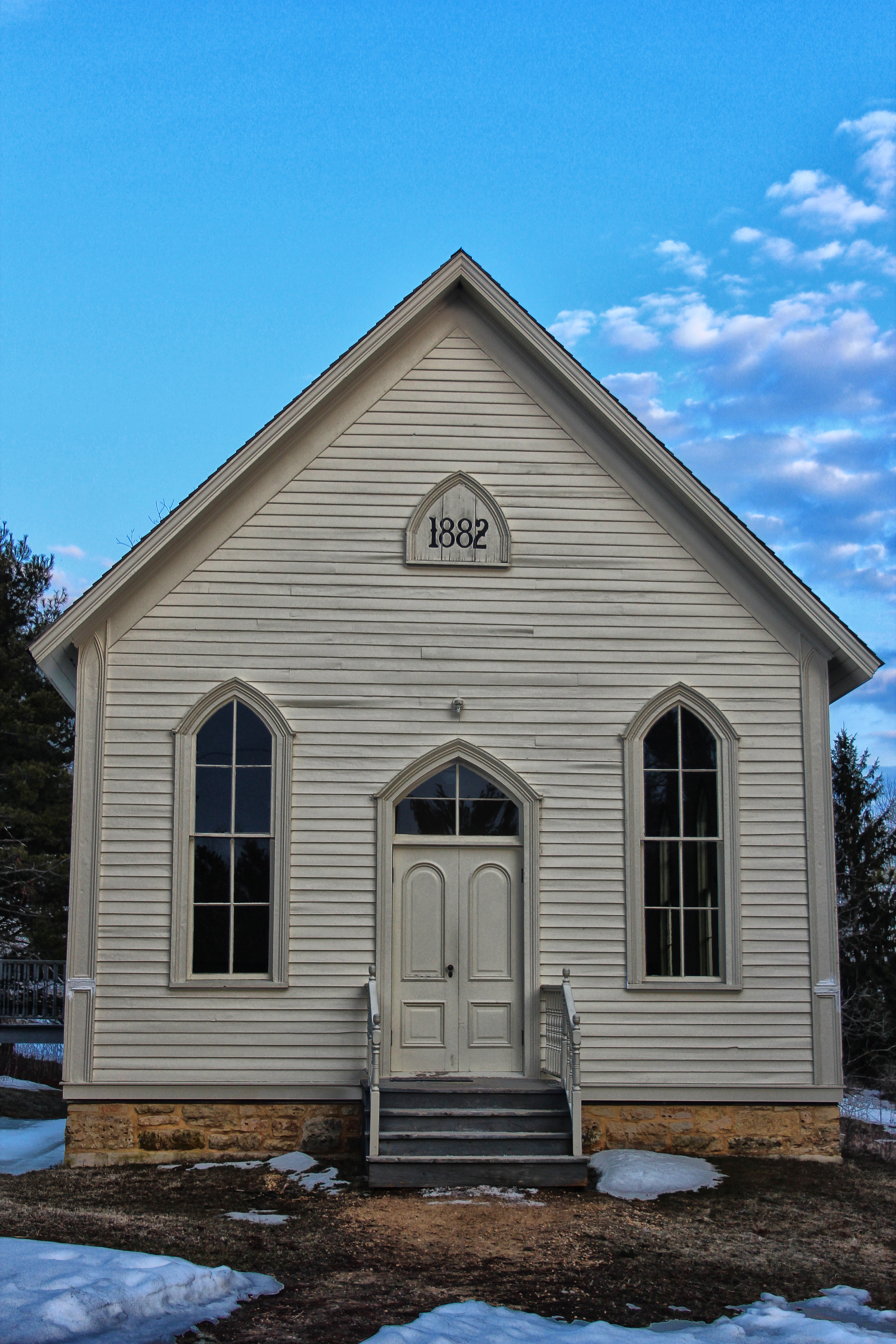
Front view in 2013
