= Thomas Grant Cretney =

American politician

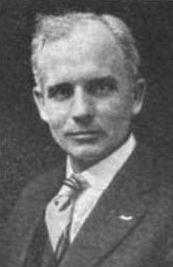

Member of the Wisconsin State Assembly
- In office 1915

Personal details
- Born: August 20, 1870 Ridgeway, Wisconsin, US
- Died: April 16, 1938 (aged 67) Madison, Wisconsin, US
- Party: Republican
- Occupation: Businessman, politician

Thomas Grant Cretney (August 20, 1870 – April 16, 1938) was an American politician and businessman.

== Biography ==
Born in the town of Ridgeway, Iowa County, Wisconsin, Cretney was a building contractor and President of the State Bank of Arena. Cretney was also in the real estate business and had invented and patented a system of traffic signs. Cretney served as president of the village of Ridgeway. In 1915, Cretney served in the Wisconsin State Assembly as a Republican. He then moved to Madison, Wisconsin and served as sergeant at arms in the Wisconsin Assembly. Cretney died in Madison after a long illness, leaving an estate valued at $13,500.
