= Hyde, Wisconsin =

- Unincorporated community
- Location within Wisconsin Location within the United States
- Coordinates: 43°04′24″N 89°58′54″W
- Country: United States
- State: Wisconsin
- County: Iowa
- Town: Ridgeway
- Elevation: 787 ft (240 m)
- Time zone: UTC-6 (Central (CST))
  - Summer (DST): UTC-5 (CDT)
- Area code: 608
- GNIS feature ID: 1577653

Hyde is an unincorporated community located in the town of Ridgeway, Iowa County, Wisconsin, United States. Hyde is located on County Highway H, 5 miles (8.0 km) north of the village of Ridgeway. The community was named for William Hyde, who opened a saw mill in the area in 1856.
