= Hyde Chapel =

- U.S. National Register of Historic Places
- U.S. Historic district
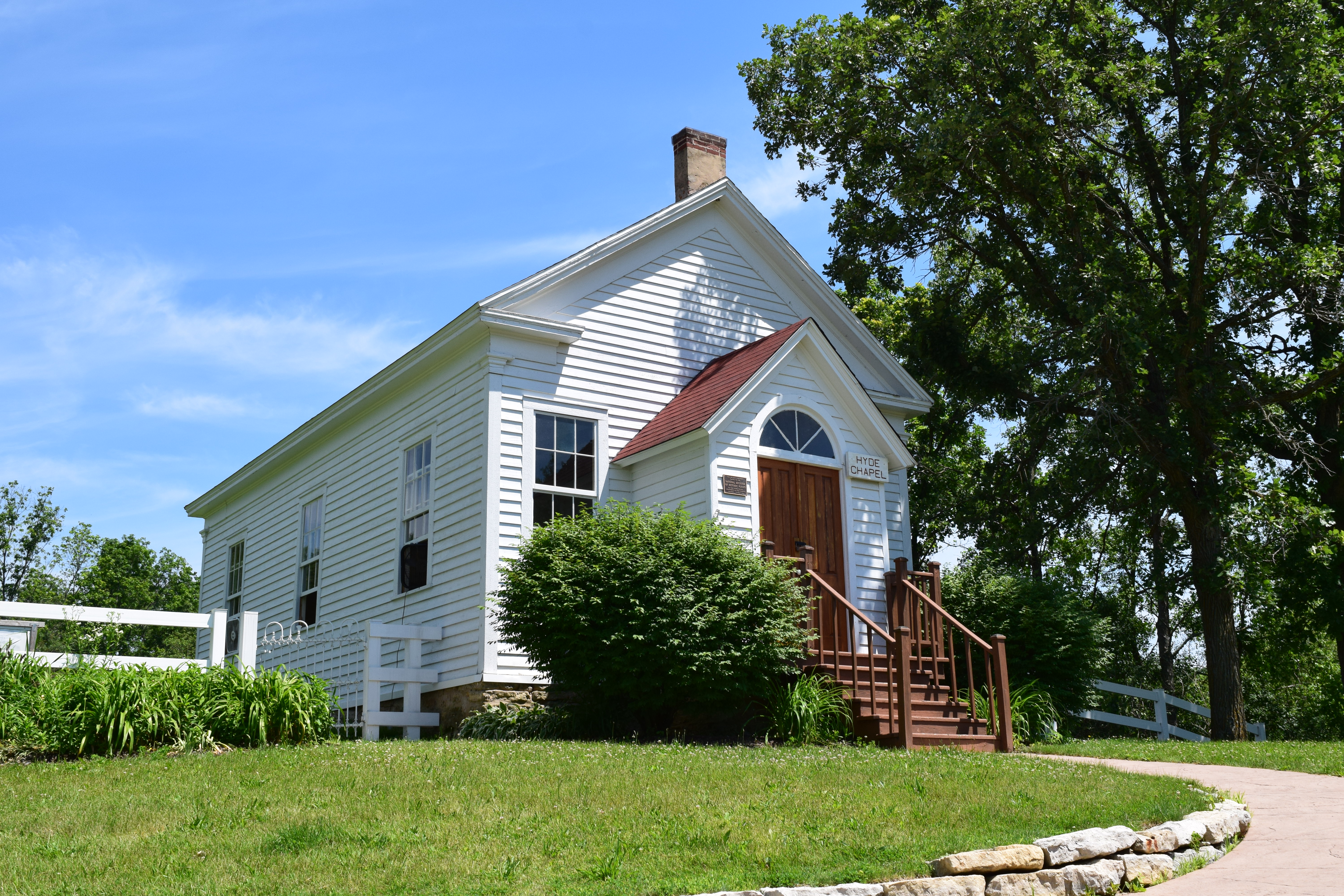

- Location within Wisconsin Location within the United States
- Location: 1 mi. S of CTH H on CTH T, Ridgeway, Wisconsin
- Coordinates: 43°4′16″N 89°57′56″W
- Area: 4 acres (1.6 ha)
- Built: 1862
- Architectural style: Greek Revival
- NRHP reference No.: 88002002
- Added to NRHP: October 13, 1988

Hyde Chapel is located in Ridgeway, Wisconsin. Originally a place of worship for Congregationalists, it also become open to Lutherans, Baptists, Methodists and Catholics. It was added to the National Register of Historic Places in 1988. Today, an active Hyde Community Association preserves the structure and the spirit of this tiny country Chapel. Meetings are held at the Chapel in the Spring and Fall where members, friends and family gather for indoor and outdoor clean-up projects followed by a pot-luck luncheon. In December an annual holiday party is celebrated. The public is always welcome. http://www.hydechapel.com/
