= Linden Methodist Church =

Historic church in Wisconsin, United States

- U.S. National Register of Historic Places
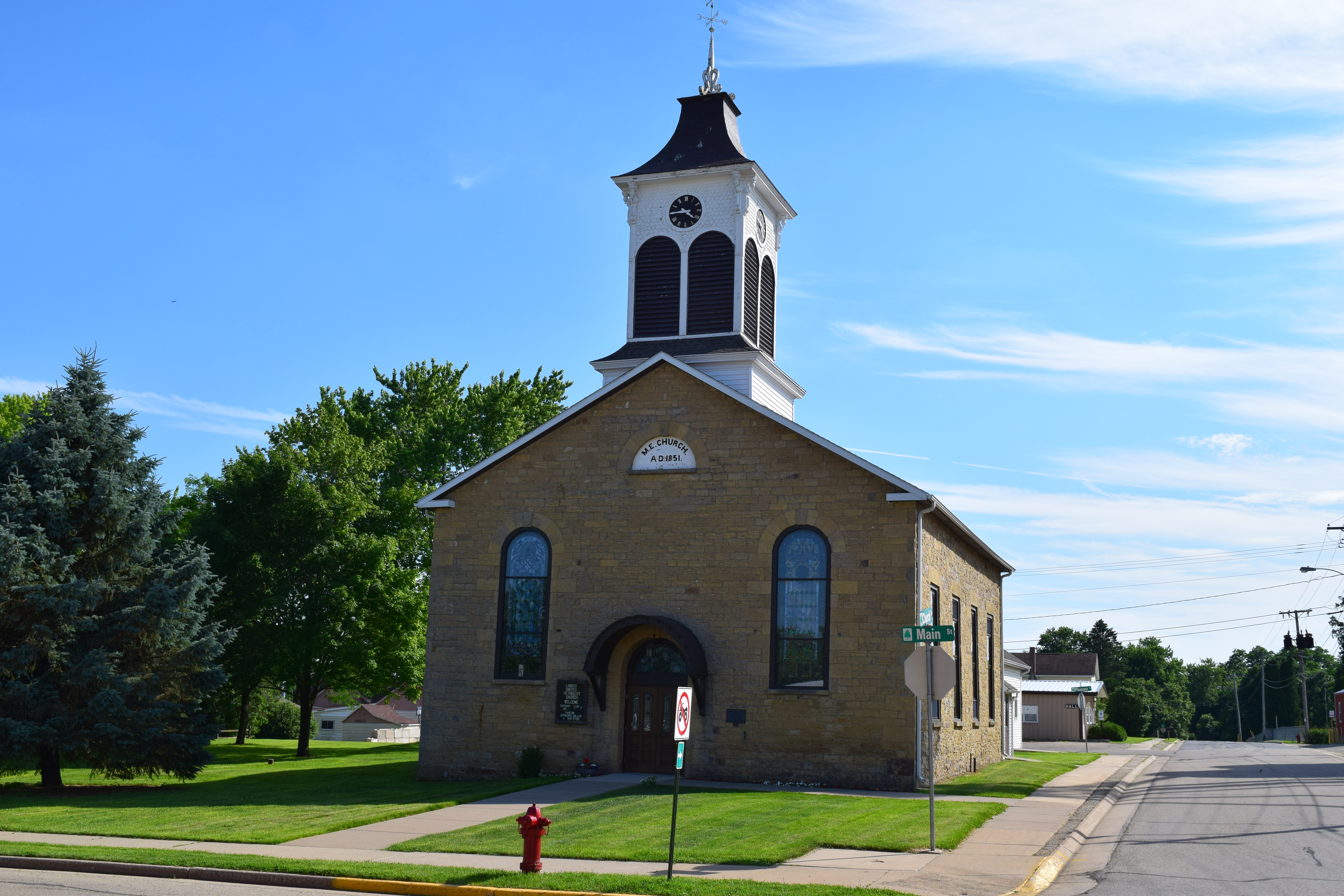

- Location within Wisconsin Location within the United States
- Location: Main and Church Sts., Linden, Wisconsin
- Coordinates: 42°55′3″N 90°16′26″W
- Area: 0.2 acres (0.081 ha)
- Built: 1851
- Architect: Thomas Blake
- NRHP reference No.: 78000099
- Added to NRHP: October 19, 1978

The Linden Methodist Church is a historic church building at the corner of Main and Church Streets in Linden, Wisconsin. Linden's Methodist congregation formed in 1834, only a few years after Linden was established as a mining community. It built a wooden church in 1836 and replaced it with a rock building in 1840, but by 1851 it had outgrown its second building as well. The 1851 church building is a limestone structure measuring 40 by 50 feet (12 by 15 m); like most contemporary churches in the area, the limestone was quarried locally by Cornish American masons. The church includes an arched entrance and stained glass windows on each side. The congregation placed a Victorian-style steeple atop the church in 1877-78.

The church was added to the National Register of Historic Places on October 19, 1978.
