= Pulaski Presbyterian Church Complex =

Historic church in Wisconsin, United States

- U.S. National Register of Historic Places
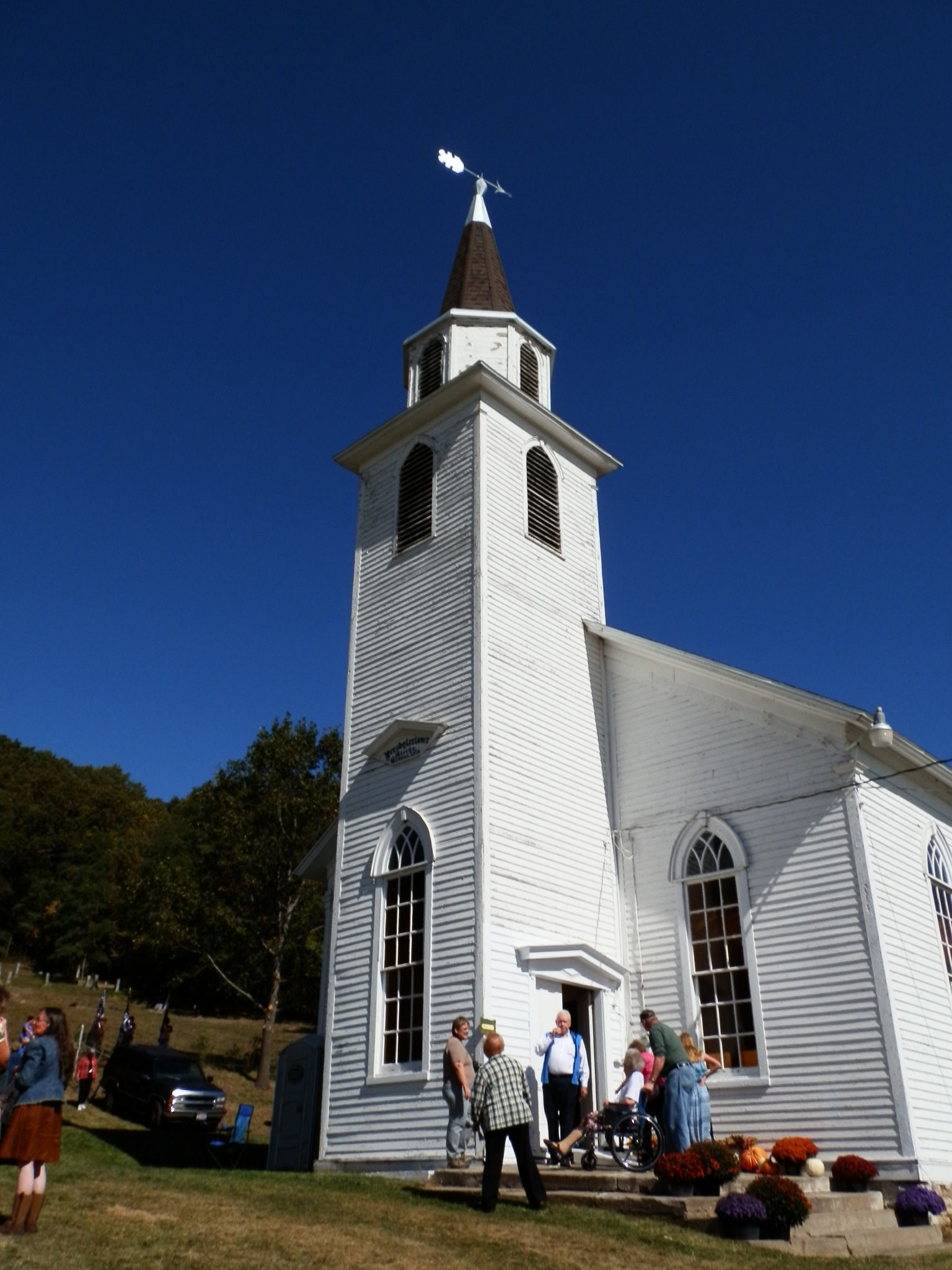
- Pulaski Presbyterian Church
- Location: 6757 Cty Hwy P Pulaski (town), Wisconsin
- Coordinates: 43.14038°N 90.40389°W
- Built: 1874/1901
- Architectural style: Gothic Revival/Vernacular
- NRHP reference No.: 13000313
- Added to NRHP: May 22, 2013

The Pulaski Presbyterian Church Complex is located in the Town of Pulaski, Wisconsin.

The Presbyterian church was built in 1874 to replace the previously used one. An affiliated schoolhouse was built on the site in 1901. The complex was added to the State Register of Historic Places in 2012 and to the National Register of Historic Places the following year.

The Schoolhouse Annex building, separated from the church building, may be considered a one-room schoolhouse.
