= Thomas Stone Barn =

- U.S. National Register of Historic Places
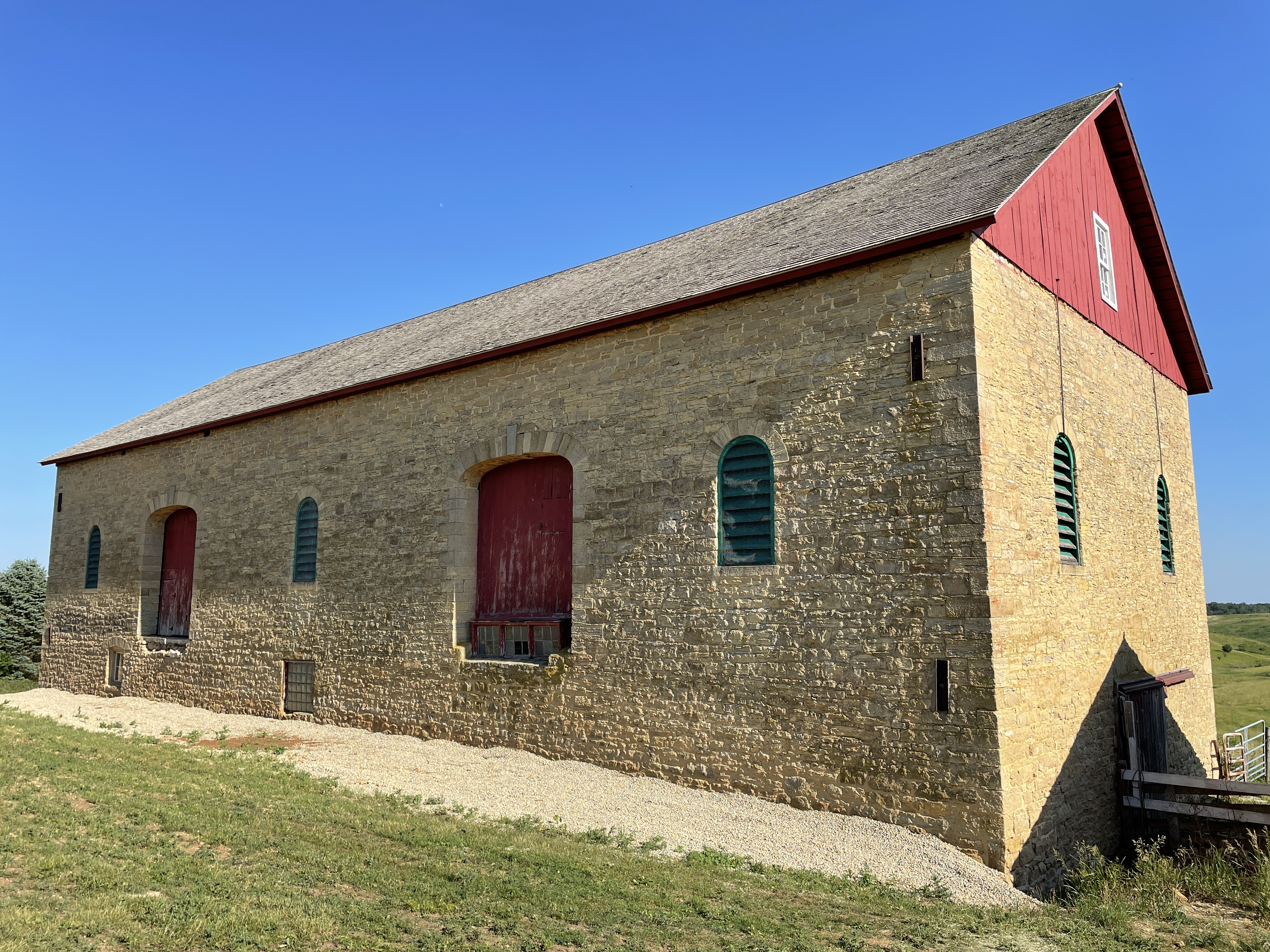
- Thomas Stone Barn
- Location: 7777 WI 18-151, Barneveld, Wisconsin
- Coordinates: 43°00′29″N 89°55′23″W
- Area: less than one acre
- Built: 1881
- Architect: Isaac Jones/Walter Thomas
- Architectural style: Late 19th And 20th Century Revivals
- NRHP reference No.: 01000299
- Added to NRHP: March 29, 2001

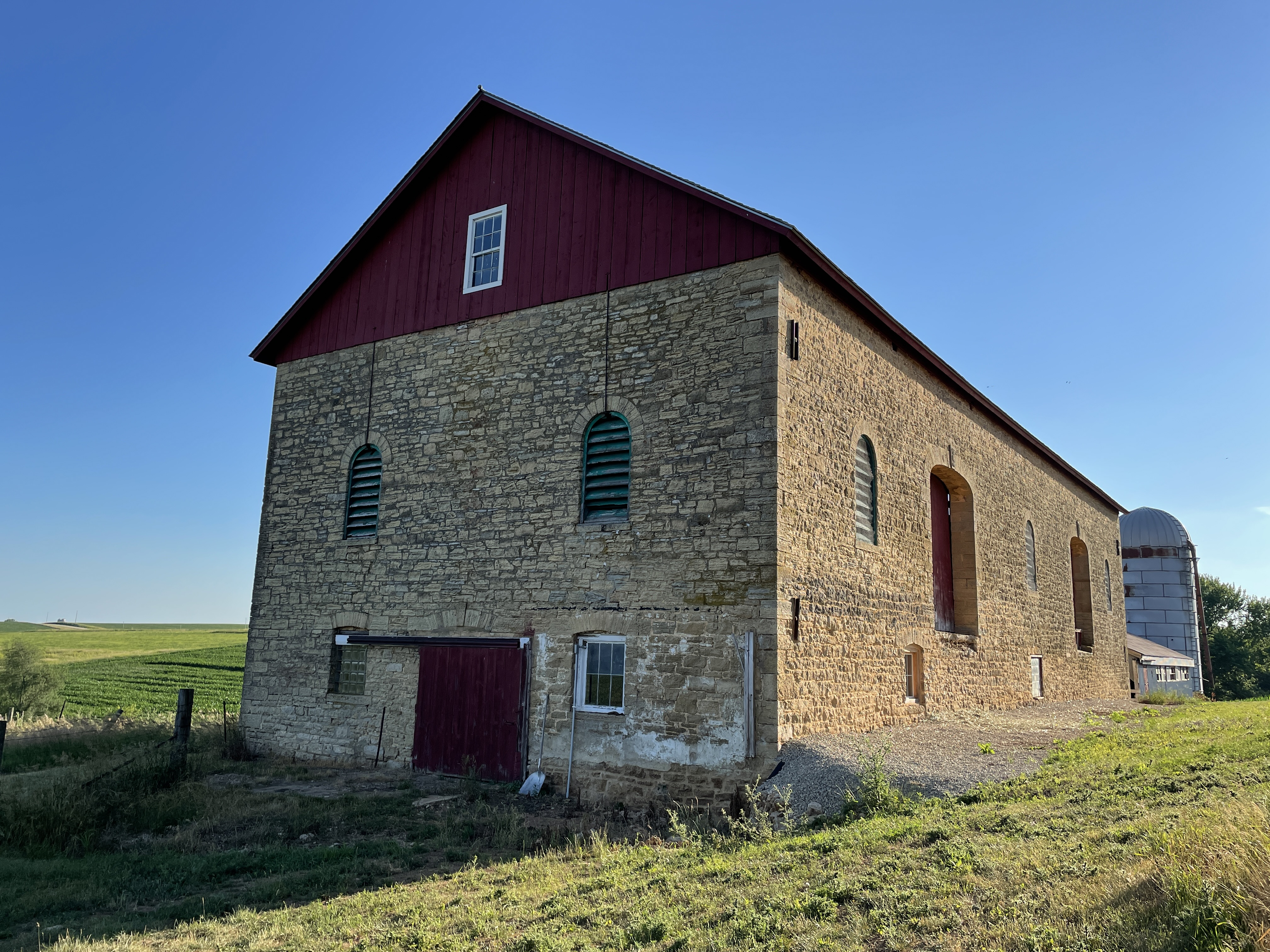
Thomas Stone Barn - View from Northeast

The Thomas Stone Barn is located in Barneveld, Wisconsin.

== History ==
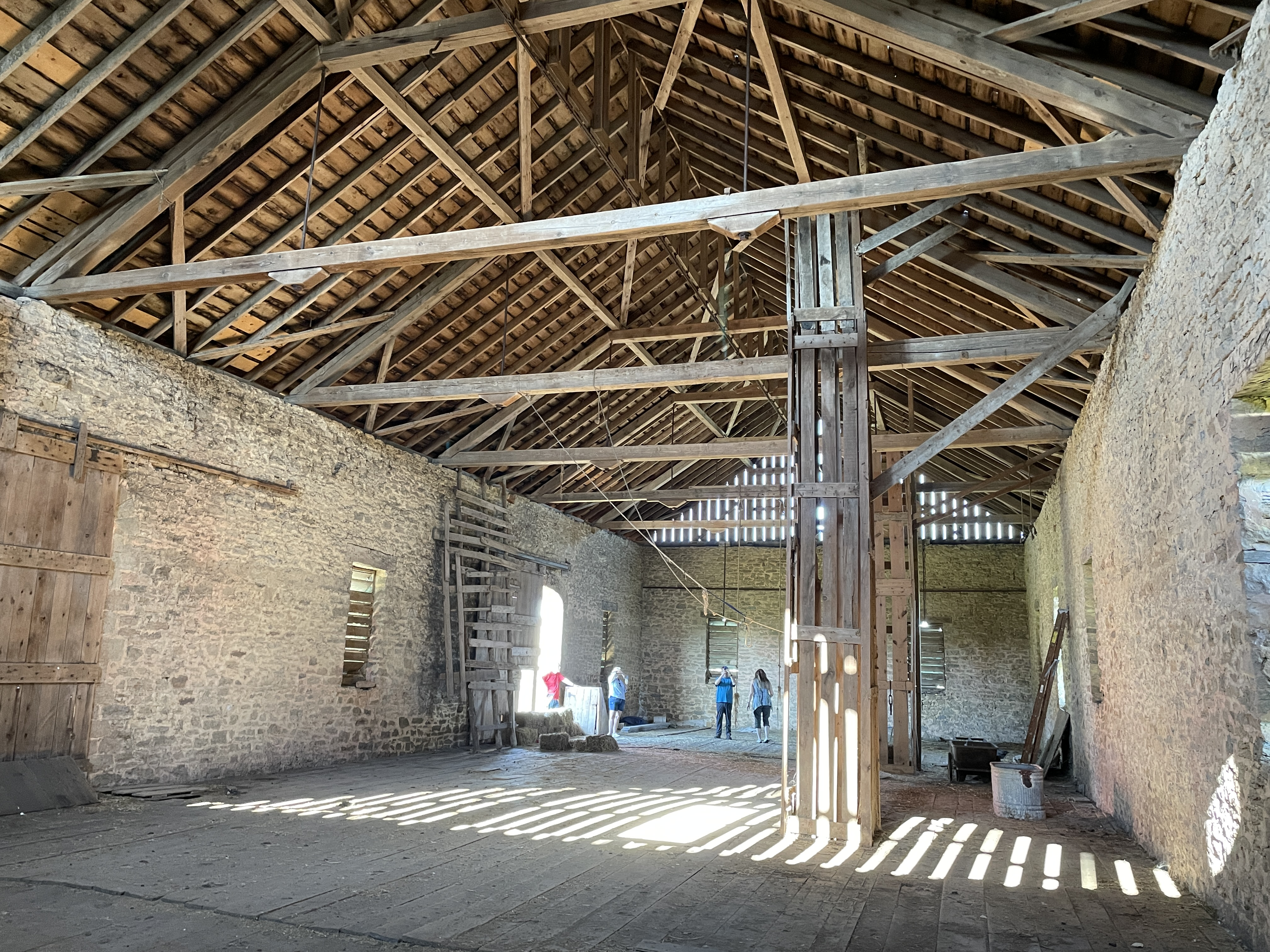

Walter Thomas was a Welsh immigrant. The barn was originally used for keeping livestock and hay. Eventually, it was converted for dairying. It was added to the State Register of Historic Places in 2000 and to the National Register of Historic Places the following year.
