= Ridgeway (town), Wisconsin =

Town in Iowa County, Wisconsin, US

Ridgeway, Wisconsin
- Town
- Town of Ridgeway
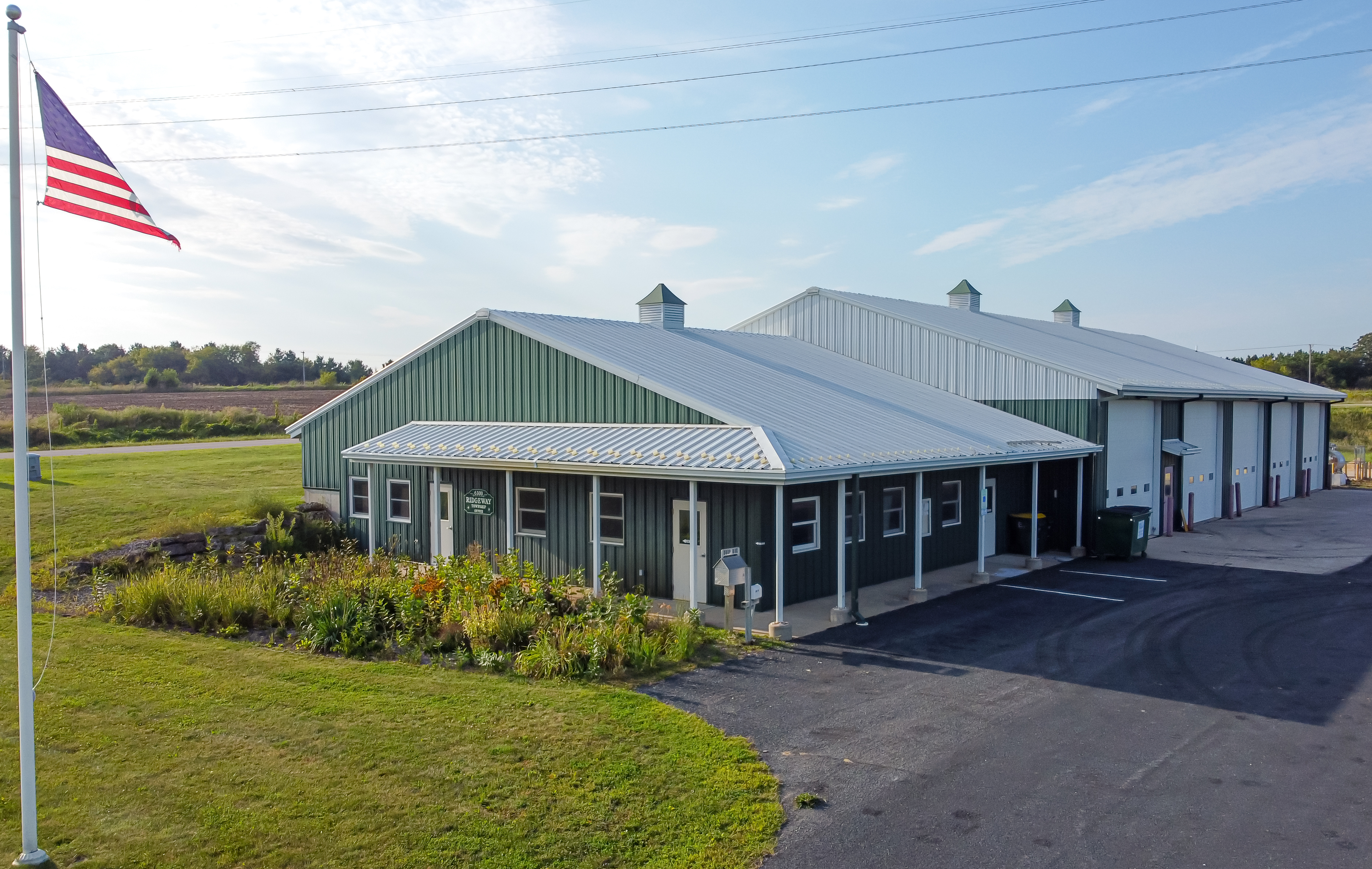
- Ridgeway Town Hall

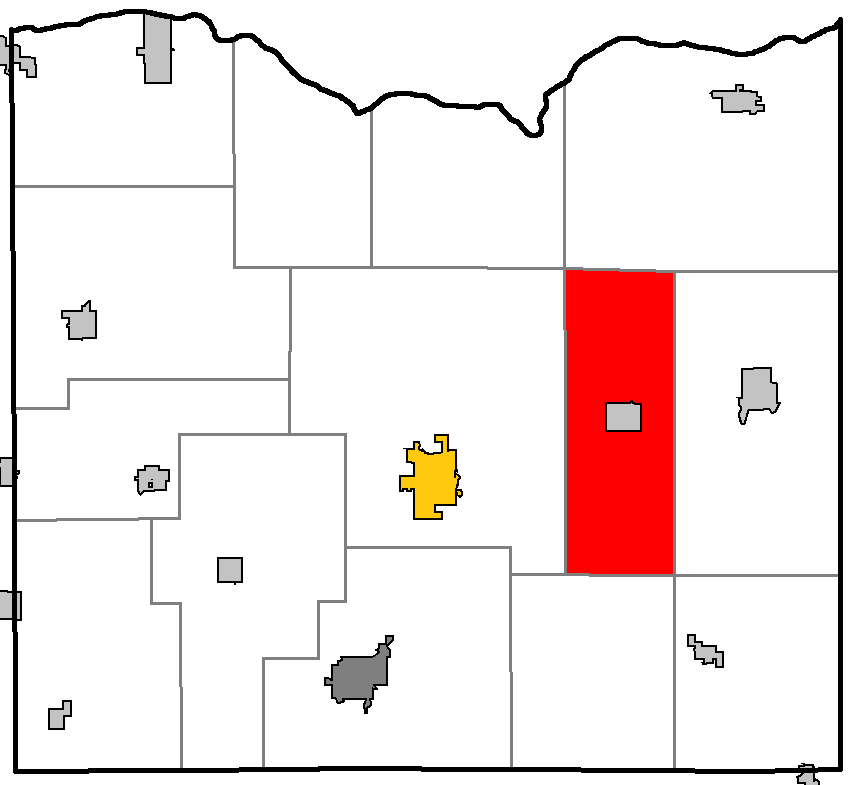
- Location of Ridgeway, within Iowa County, Wisconsin

- Location of Iowa County, Wisconsin
- Coordinates: 42°57′21″N 90°00′53″W
- Country: United States
- State: Wisconsin
- County: Iowa

Area
  - Total: 42.75 sq mi (110.7 km^{2})
  - Land: 42.72 sq mi (110.6 km^{2})
  - Water: 0.02 sq mi (0.052 km^{2})

Population (2020)
  - Total: 563
  - Density: 13.2/sq mi (5.09/km^{2})
- Time zone: UTC-6 (Central (CST))
  - Summer (DST): UTC-5 (CDT)
- Area code(s): 608 and 353
- GNIS feature ID: 1584035

Ridgeway is a town in Iowa County, Wisconsin, United States. The population was 563 at the 2020 census. The Village of Ridgeway is located within the town. The unincorporated community of Hyde is also located in the town.

== Geography ==
According to the United States Census Bureau, the town has a total area of 42.7 square miles (110.6 km^{2}), of which 42.7 square miles (110.6 km^{2}) is land and 0.04 square mile (0.1 km^{2}) (0.07%) is water.

== Demographics ==
As of the census of 2000, there were 581 people, 211 households, and 166 families residing in the town. The population density was 13.6 people per square mile (5.3/km^{2}). There were 237 housing units at an average density of 5.6 per square mile (2.1/km^{2}). The racial makeup of the town was 98.80% White, 0.17% Black or African American, 0.17% Native American, 0.17% Asian, 0.17% from other races, and 0.52% from two or more races. 0.34% of the population were Hispanic or Latino of any race.

There were 211 households, out of which 36.0% had children under the age of 18 living with them, 68.7% were married couples living together, 4.7% had a female householder with no husband present, and 20.9% were non-families. 16.1% of all households were made up of individuals, and 4.3% had someone living alone who was 65 years of age or older. The average household size was 2.72 and the average family size was 3.05.

In the town, the population was spread out, with 28.7% under the age of 18, 4.0% from 18 to 24, 31.8% from 25 to 44, 26.5% from 45 to 64, and 9.0% who were 65 years of age or older. The median age was 38 years. For every 100 females, there were 99.7 males. For every 100 females age 18 and over, there were 106.0 males.

The median income for a household in the town was $50,938, and the median income for a family was $54,500. Males had a median income of $35,455 versus $27,344 for females. The per capita income for the town was $18,419. About 8.4% of families and 11.2% of the population were below the poverty line, including 12.3% of those under age 18 and 19.2% of those age 65 or over.

== History ==
Ridgeway is also very well known for its ghost stories. From the 1840s to as late as the 1990s there have been many reportings of the "Ridgeway Ghost." The Ridgeway Phantom has even reportedly killed someone, which is rare for ghost stories. The Wisconsin Historical Society points to an article in The New York Times, dated December 7, 1902. The stories number in the hundreds and include haunted houses, and even werewolf sightings.
