= Old Rock School (Dodgeville, Wisconsin) =

- U.S. National Register of Historic Places
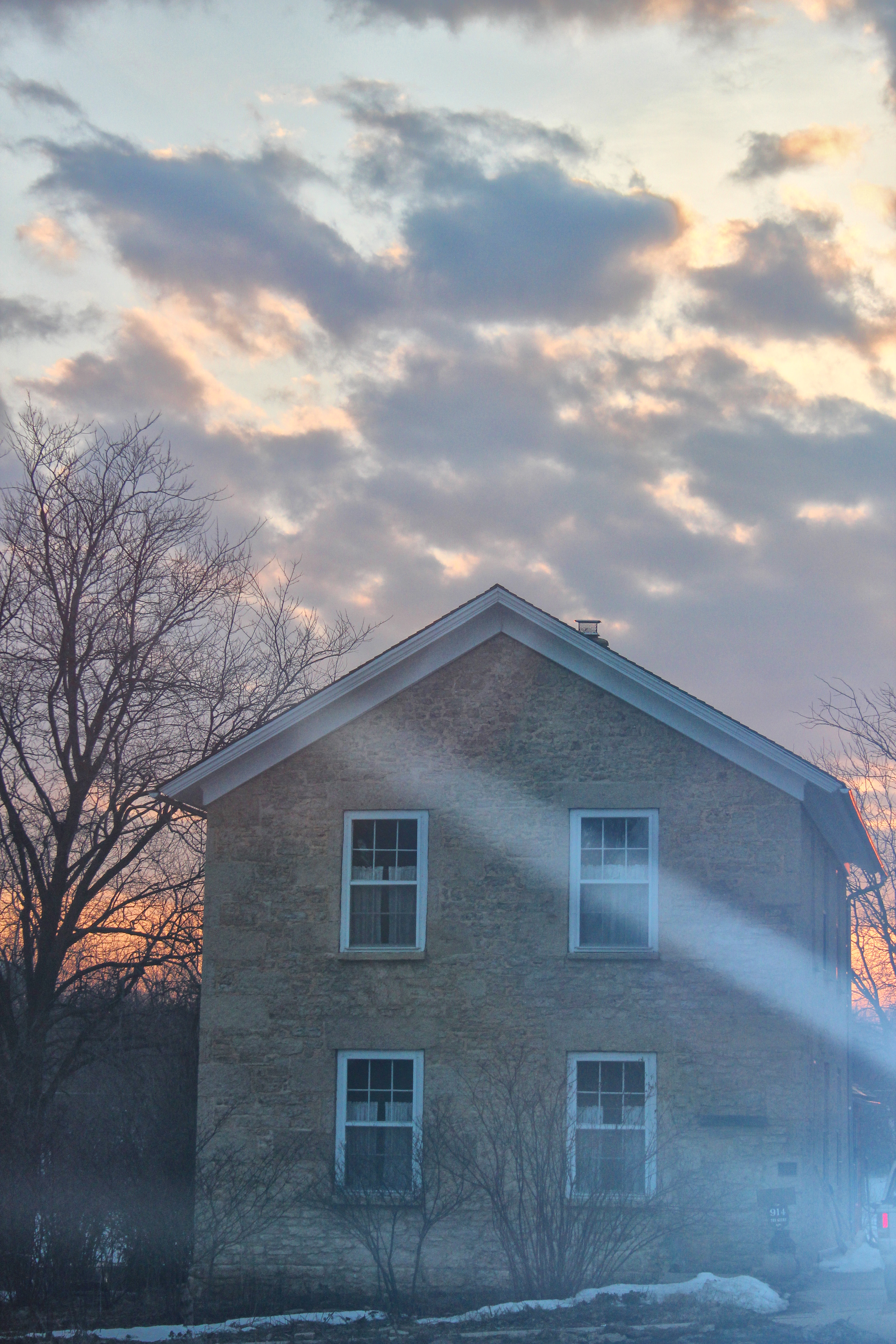

- Location within Wisconsin Location within the United States
- Location: 914 Bequette St., Dodgeville, Wisconsin
- Coordinates: 42°58′7″N 90°7′59″W
- Built: 1853
- Architect: Carkeek, Thomas
- NRHP reference No.: 78000101
- Added to NRHP: December 18, 1978

The Old Rock School in Dodgeville, Wisconsin is a school that was built in 1853 and converted into a private house in 1882. It was listed on the National Register of Historic Places in 1978.

It is a two-story building constructed of limestone rubble, with massive blocks of dressed limestone serving as quoins and lintels. It has a central chimney and a gable roof. Its interior dimensions are 22 feet (6.7 m) by 36 feet (11 m). The school was converted into a one-family house in the 1890s and into a multiple unit residence in the 1950s.
