= Spensley Farm =

- U.S. National Register of Historic Places
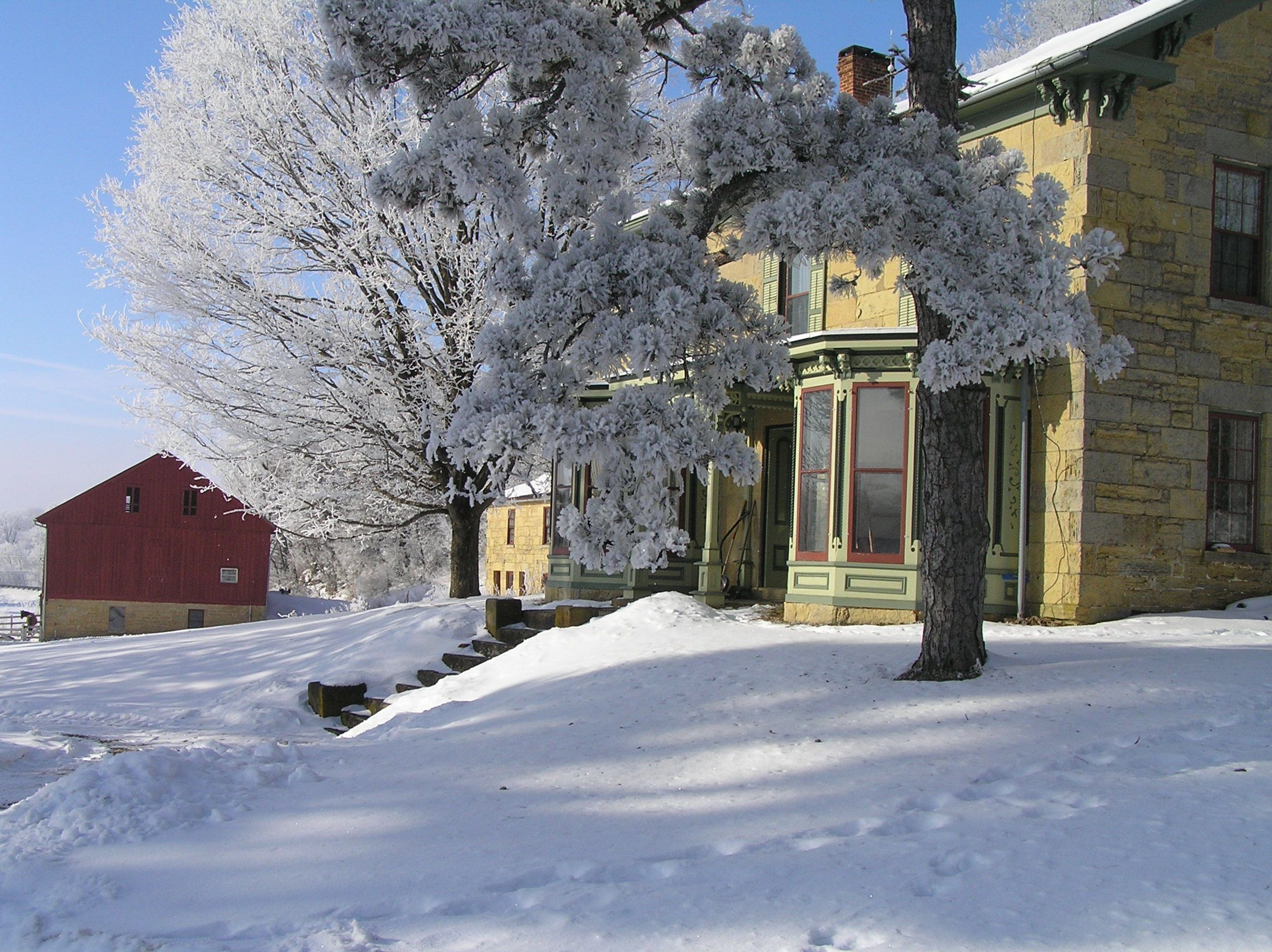
- A portion of the farm.
- Location: 1126 WI QQ, E of jct. with WI 39, Mineral Point, Wisconsin
- Area: 13 acres (5.3 ha)
- Architectural style: Italianate
- NRHP reference No.: 97000330
- Added to NRHP: April 14, 1997

The Spensely Farm is located in Mineral Point, Wisconsin.

== History ==
James Spensley was a British immigrant who would become a local politician. Structures on the site include Spensley's house, a spring house, a lead-smelting furnace and a barn. It was added to the State Register of Historic Places in 1996 and to the National Register of Historic Places the following year.
