= Helena, Wisconsin =

- Unincorporated community
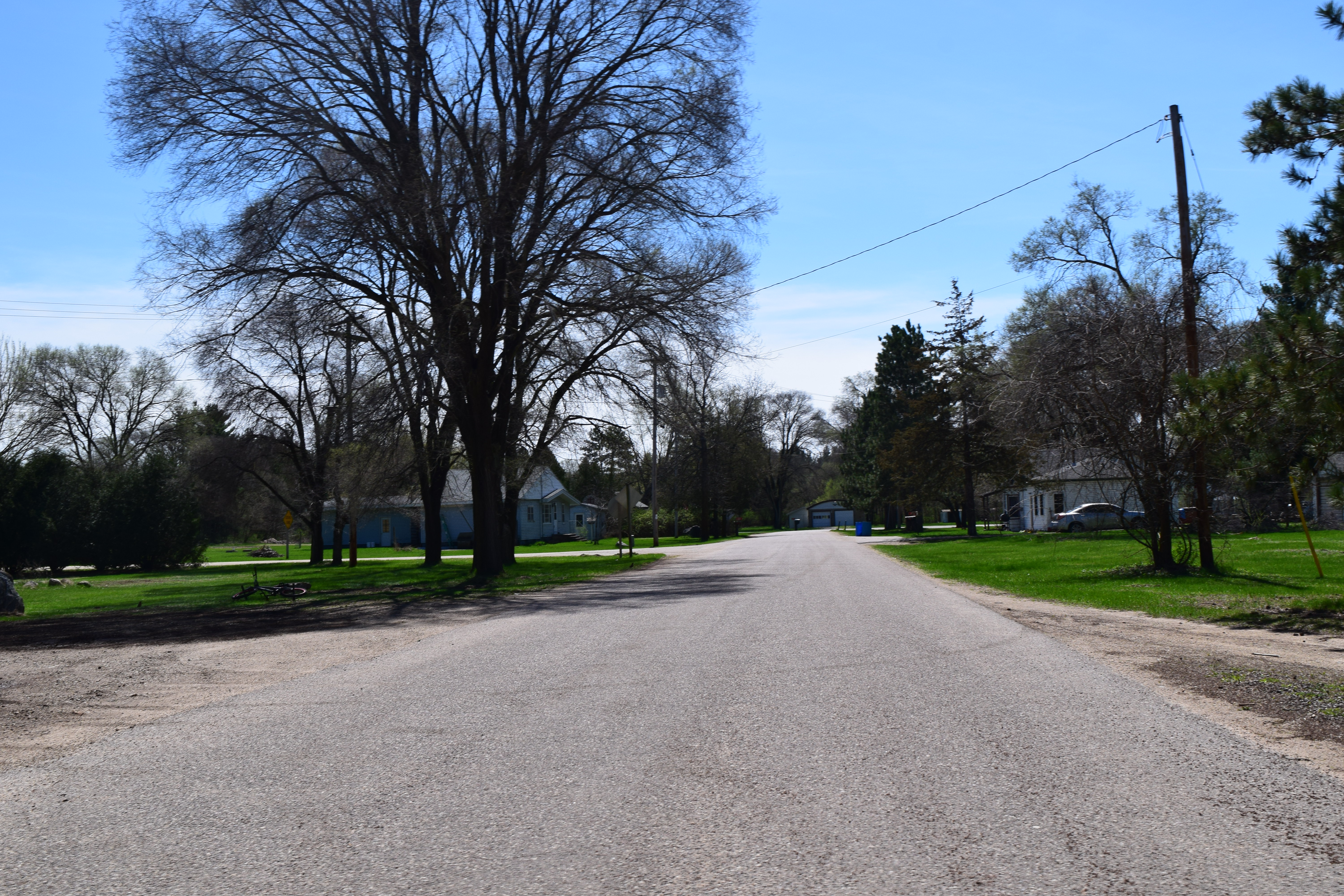
- Houses on Helena Road

- Location within Wisconsin Location within the United States
- Coordinates: 43°10′17″N 90°01′20″W
- Country: United States
- State: Wisconsin
- County: Iowa
- Town: Arena
- Elevation: 712 ft (217 m)
- Time zone: UTC-6 (Central (CST))
  - Summer (DST): UTC-5 (CDT)
- Area code: 608
- GNIS feature ID: 1566276

Helena is an unincorporated community in the town of Arena in Iowa County, Wisconsin, United States. In the 19th century, Helena was a village that played an important role in the manufacture and shipping of lead shot. The buildings of Helena played a key role in the Black Hawk War of 1832, despite being abandoned at the time.

== History ==
Although always situated on the Wisconsin River, Helena has existed in three different locations. The first village of Helena was staked out by Henry Dodge as a river port convenient to recently discovered lead deposits around Dodgeville, Blue Mounds, and Mineral Point. In 1831 Daniel Whitney, an entrepreneur from Green Bay, Wisconsin, formed a company to build a shot tower on a nearby bluff. Helena was emptied during 1832 when most of its inhabitants joined militias to fight in the Black Hawk War. Following the Battle of Wisconsin Heights, Black Hawk and his allies fled across the Wisconsin River. To follow them the U.S. army under the command of Henry Atkinson marched 15 miles (24 km) and arrived in Helena on July 26, 1832. They tore down many of the buildings to make rafts. Approximately 1,300 men were ferried across the Wisconsin River at Helena over the next two days. They caught up with their opponents on August 1 and conclusively ended the war with the Bad Axe Massacre.

After the war Daniel Whitney and his company relocated the village of Helena a few miles to the northeast, adjacent to their Helena Shot Tower. Other settlers joined the shot tower employees and the village grew. Helena reached its peak prosperity in the mid-1850s. However a bridge was built across the river several miles upstream, and consequently the railroad was built through Spring Green instead of Helena. The Panic of 1857 further depressed Helena's economy. The town was moved again, four miles (6.4 km) to the northeast, to be along the rail line. It did not flourish, and in the mid-1860s Helena had only 50 inhabitants.

== Today ==
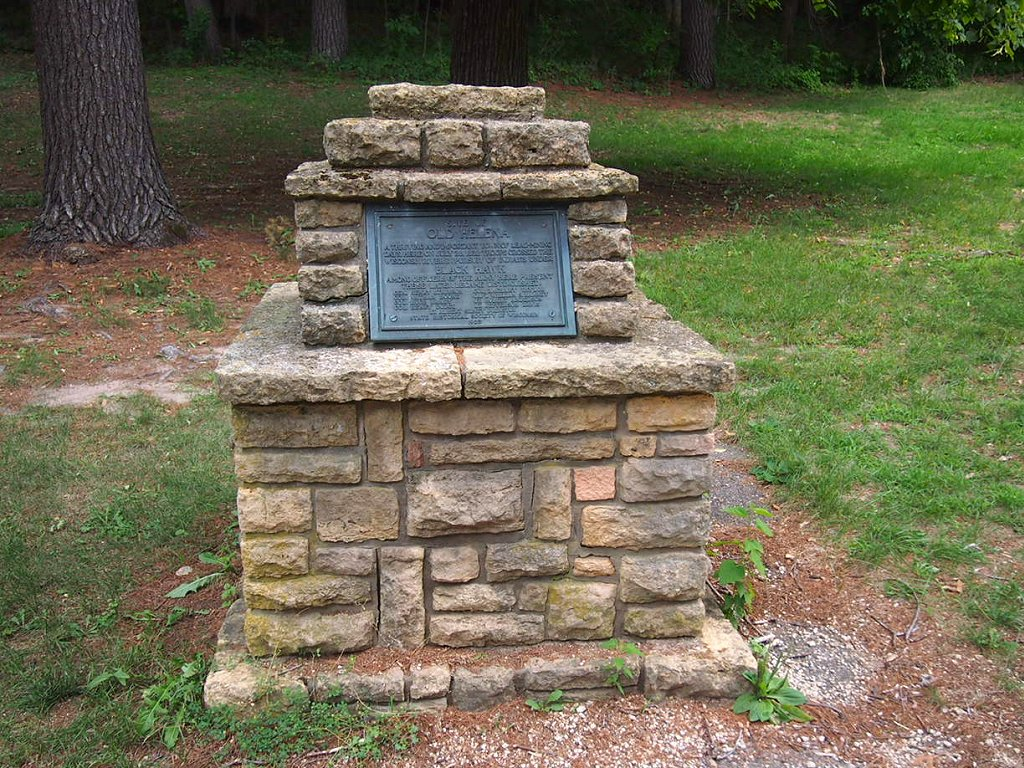
Historical marker of Helena's second location, in Tower Hill State Park

Remnants of Helena's second iteration are visible today in Tower Hill State Park, including a reconstruction of the shot tower. The Old Helena Cemetery is across the road.

== Notable person ==
Owen King was a Helena lumber dealer who served as a member of the Wisconsin State Assembly in the 1870s, first as a Reform Party member, then as a Greenbacker.
