= Roethlisberger House =

- U.S. National Register of Historic Places
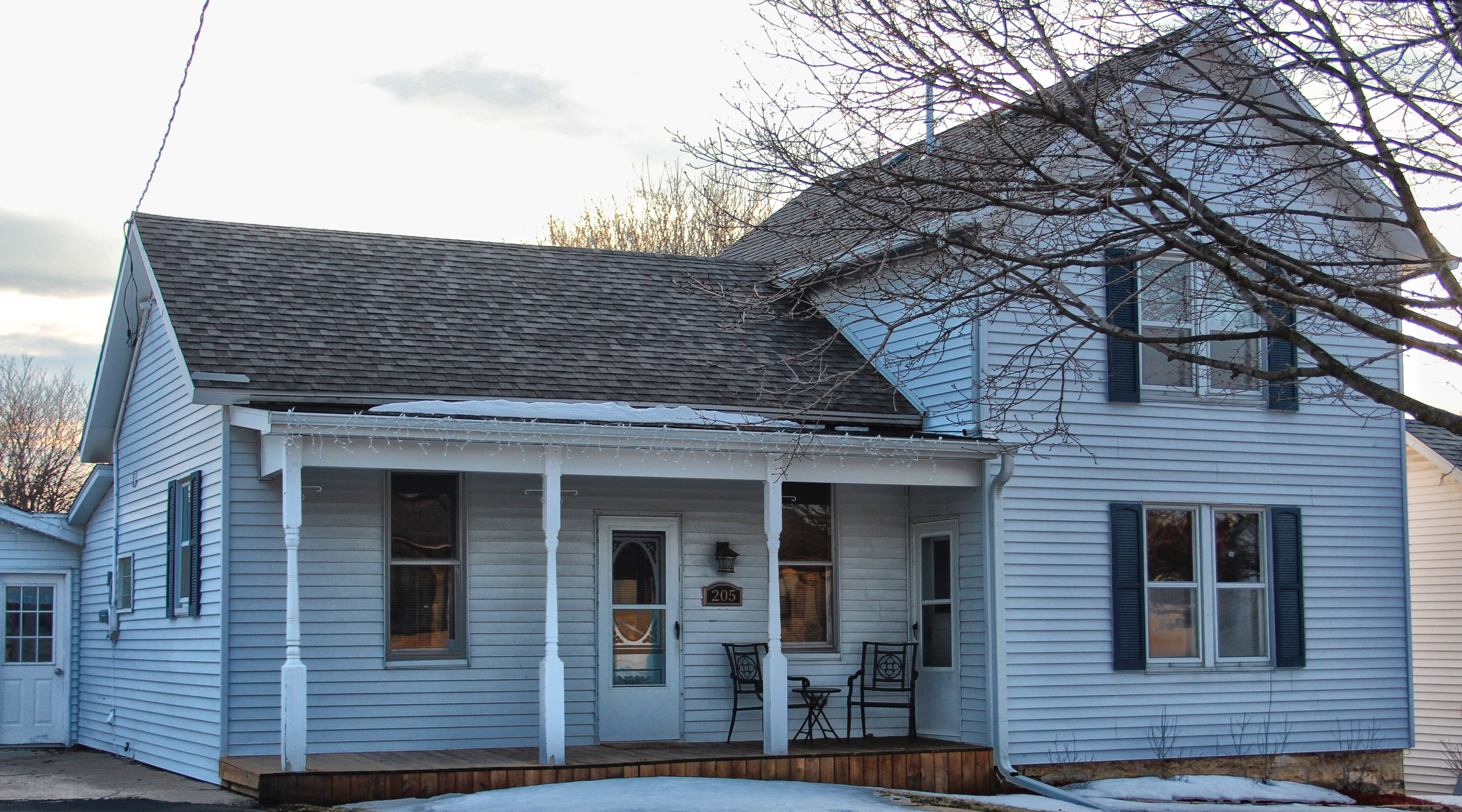

- Location within Wisconsin
- Location: 205 N. Grove St., Barneveld, Wisconsin
- Coordinates: 43°00′53″N 89°53′54″W
- Area: less than one acre
- Built: 1880s
- Architectural style: Vernancular, Queen Anne
- MPS: Barneveld MRA
- NRHP reference No.: 86002312
- Added to NRHP: September 29, 1986

The Roethlisberger House is a historic house at 205 N. Grove Street in Barneveld, Wisconsin. While the house's construction date is not known, it most likely was built in the 1880s, when the Harvey Jones Addition area of Barneveld was developed. The house has a gable ell plan, a popular vernacular form which consists of a two-story front gabled section with a one-story wing on one side. It is decorated with Queen Anne elements such as turned posts supporting the front porch, stained glass windows, and patterned shingles. As of a historic resources inventory taken in the 1980s, the house was the most intact gable ell house remaining in Barneveld, as others had either been renovated or destroyed by a 1984 tornado.

The house was added to the National Register of Historic Places on September 29, 1986.
