= Pulaski (town), Wisconsin =

Town in Iowa County, Wisconsin, United States

Pulaski, Wisconsin
- Town
- Town of Pulaski
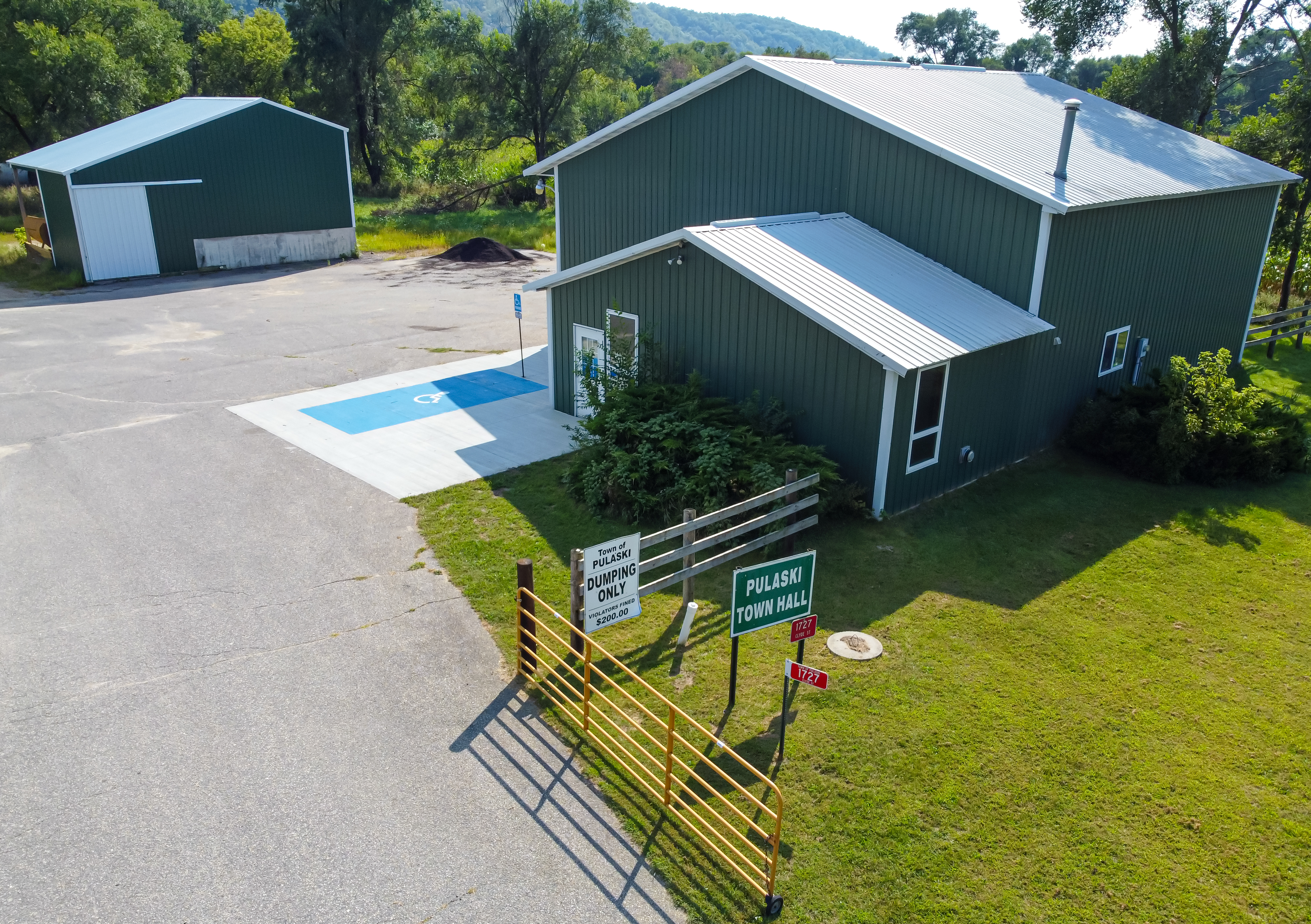
- Pulaski Town Hall

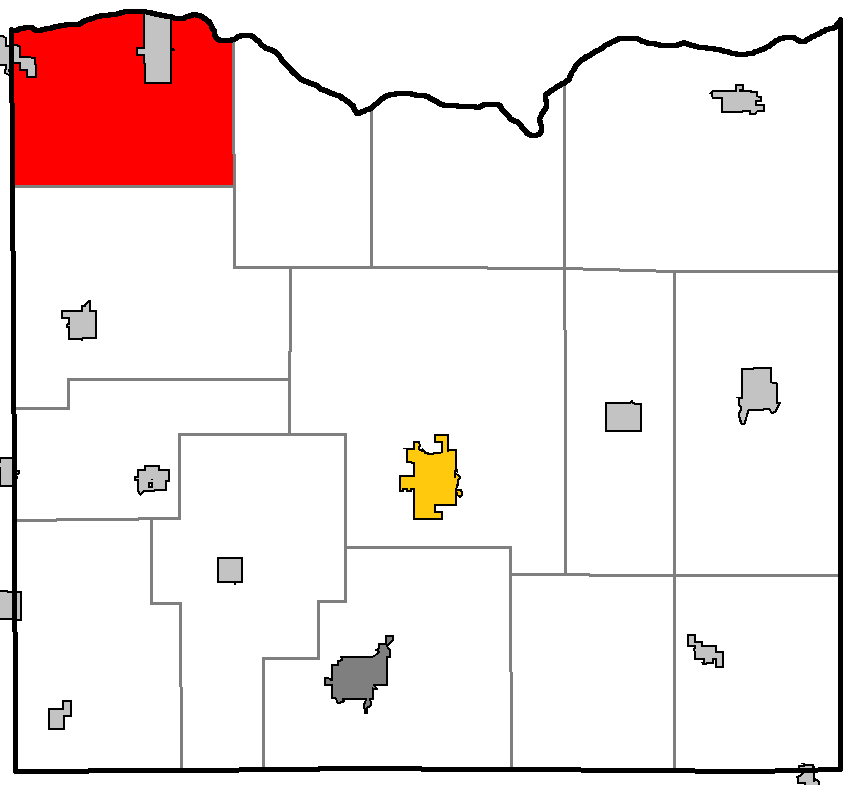
- Location of Pulaski, within Iowa County, Wisconsin

- Location of Iowa County, Wisconsin
- Coordinates: 43°09′28″N 90°21′17″W
- Country: United States
- State: Wisconsin
- Wisconsin: Iowa

Area
  - Total: 44.52 sq mi (115.3 km^{2})
  - Land: 43.26 sq mi (112.0 km^{2})
  - Water: 1.26 sq mi (3.3 km^{2})

Population (2020)
  - Total: 357
  - Density: 8.25/sq mi (3.19/km^{2})
- Time zone: UTC-6 (Central (CST))
  - Summer (DST): UTC-5 (CDT)
- Area code(s): 608 and 353
- GNIS feature ID: 1583989
- Website: https://townofpulaskiwi.gov/

Pulaski is a town in Iowa County, Wisconsin, United States. The population was 357 at the 2020 census.

== Geography ==
According to the United States Census Bureau, the town has a total area of 44.6 square miles (115.6 km^{2}), of which 43.3 square miles (112.1 km^{2}) is land and 1.4 square miles (3.5 km^{2}) (3.02%) is water.

== Demographics ==
As of the census of 2000, there were 381 people, 135 households, and 102 families residing in the town. The population density was 8.8 people per square mile (3.4/km^{2}). There were 155 housing units at an average density of 3.6 per square mile (1.4/km^{2}). The racial makeup of the town was 98.16% White, 0.26% African American and 1.57% Native American.

There were 135 households, out of which 39.3% had children under the age of 18 living with them, 64.4% were married couples living together, 5.9% had a female householder with no husband present, and 24.4% were non-families. 18.5% of all households were made up of individuals, and 8.9% had someone living alone who was 65 years of age or older. The average household size was 2.82 and the average family size was 3.22.

In the town, the population was spread out, with 28.9% under the age of 18, 6.8% from 18 to 24, 27.6% from 25 to 44, 26.2% from 45 to 64, and 10.5% who were 65 years of age or older. The median age was 37 years. For every 100 females, there were 108.2 males. For every 100 females age 18 and over, there were 102.2 males.

The median income for a household in the town was $43,036, and the median income for a family was $46,250. Males had a median income of $26,250 versus $21,923 for females. The per capita income for the town was $15,561. About 8.5% of families and 9.2% of the population were below the poverty line, including 7.8% of those under age 18 and 30.3% of those age 65 or over.
