= Brigham, Wisconsin =

Town of Brigham
- Town
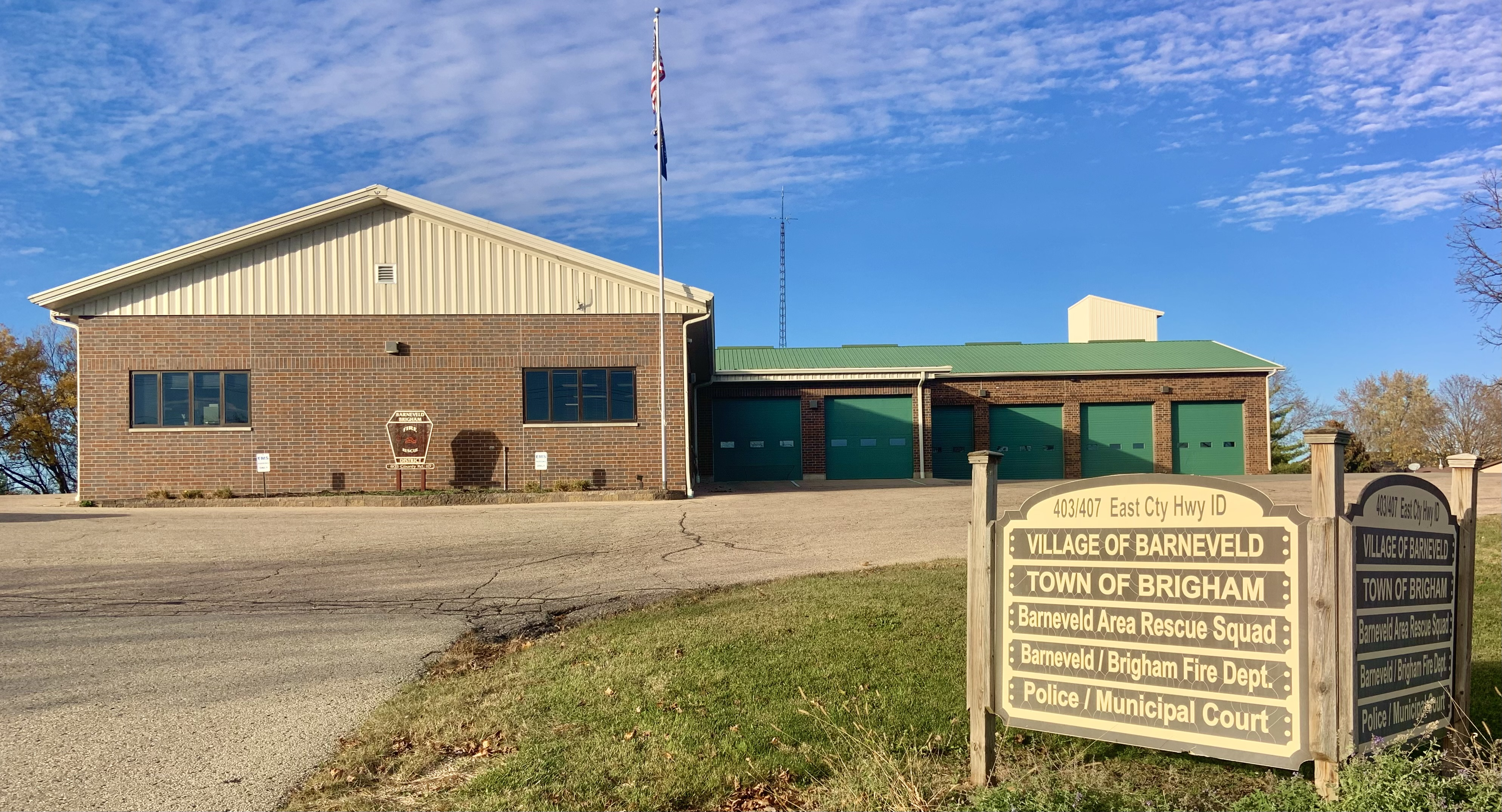
- Brigham Town Hall also the Barneveld Village Hall

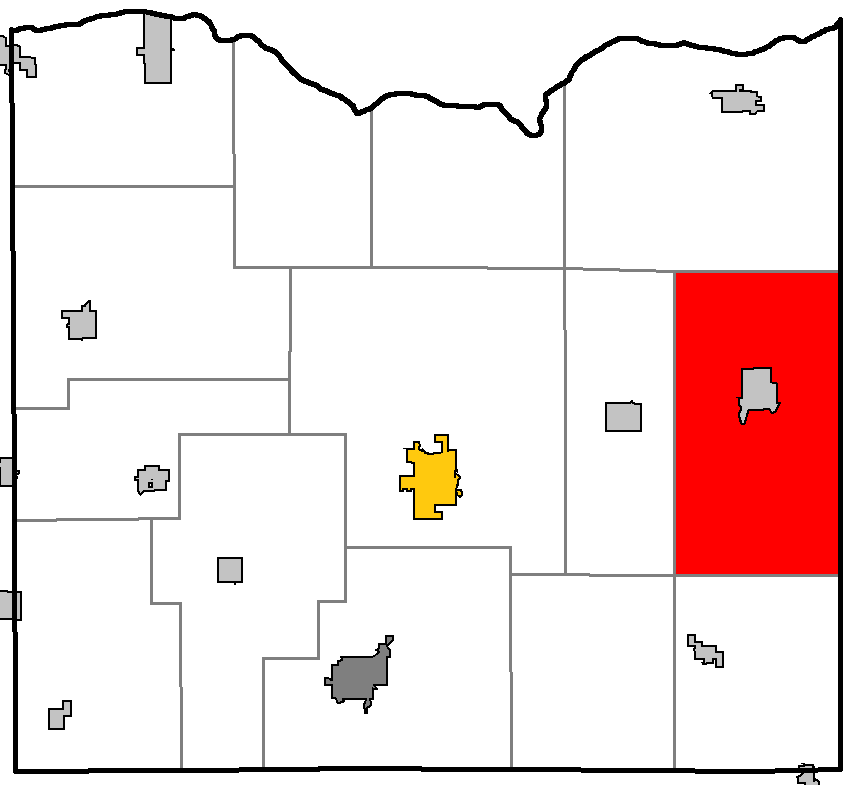
- Location of the Town of Brigham, within Iowa County, Wisconsin

- Location of Iowa County, Wisconsin
- Coordinates: 43°0′31″N 89°54′4″W
- Country: United States
- State: Wisconsin
- County: Iowa

Area
  - Total: 64.1 sq mi (166.0 km^{2})
  - Land: 64.1 sq mi (165.9 km^{2})
  - Water: 0.039 sq mi (0.1 km^{2})
- Elevation: 1,132 ft (345 m)

Population (2020)
  - Total: 1,037
  - Density: 16.19/sq mi (6.251/km^{2})
- Time zone: UTC-6 (Central (CST))
  - Summer (DST): UTC-5 (CDT)
- Area code: 608
- FIPS code: 55-09600
- GNIS feature ID: 1582857
- Website: https://brighamtown.com/

The Town of Brigham is a town located in Iowa County, Wisconsin, United States. The population was 1,037 at the 2020 census. The unincorporated community of Middlebury is located in the town. The village of Barneveld is surrounded by the town's limits.

== Geography ==
According to the United States Census Bureau, the town has a total area of 64.1 square miles (166.0 km^{2}), of which 64.1 square miles (165.9 km^{2}) is land and 0.04 square mile (0.1 km^{2}) (0.03%) is water.

== Demographics ==
As of the census of 2000, there were 908 people, 335 households, and 262 families residing in the town. The population density was 14.2 people per square mile (5.5/km^{2}). There were 375 housing units at an average density of 5.9 per square mile (2.3/km^{2}). The racial makeup of the town was 99.01% White, 0.22% African American, 0.22% from other races, and 0.55% from two or more races. Hispanic or Latino of any race were 0.44% of the population.

There were 335 households, out of which 36.4% had children under the age of 18 living with them, 72.8% were married couples living together, 3.9% had a female householder with no husband present, and 21.5% were non-families. 17.3% of all households were made up of individuals, and 6.0% had someone living alone who was 65 years of age or older. The average household size was 2.70 and the average family size was 3.05.

In the town, the population was spread out, with 26.1% under the age of 18, 5.3% from 18 to 24, 32.3% from 25 to 44, 26.9% from 45 to 64, and 9.5% who were 65 years of age or older. The median age was 39 years. For every 100 females, there were 109.7 males. For every 100 females age 18 and over, there were 111.7 males.

The median income for a household in the town was $57,500, and the median income for a family was $65,208. Males had a median income of $35,104 versus $27,143 for females. The per capita income for the town was $23,469. About 4.8% of families and 5.5% of the population were below the poverty line, including 3.6% of those under age 18 and 13.3% of those age 65 or over.
