= Linden, Wisconsin =

- Village
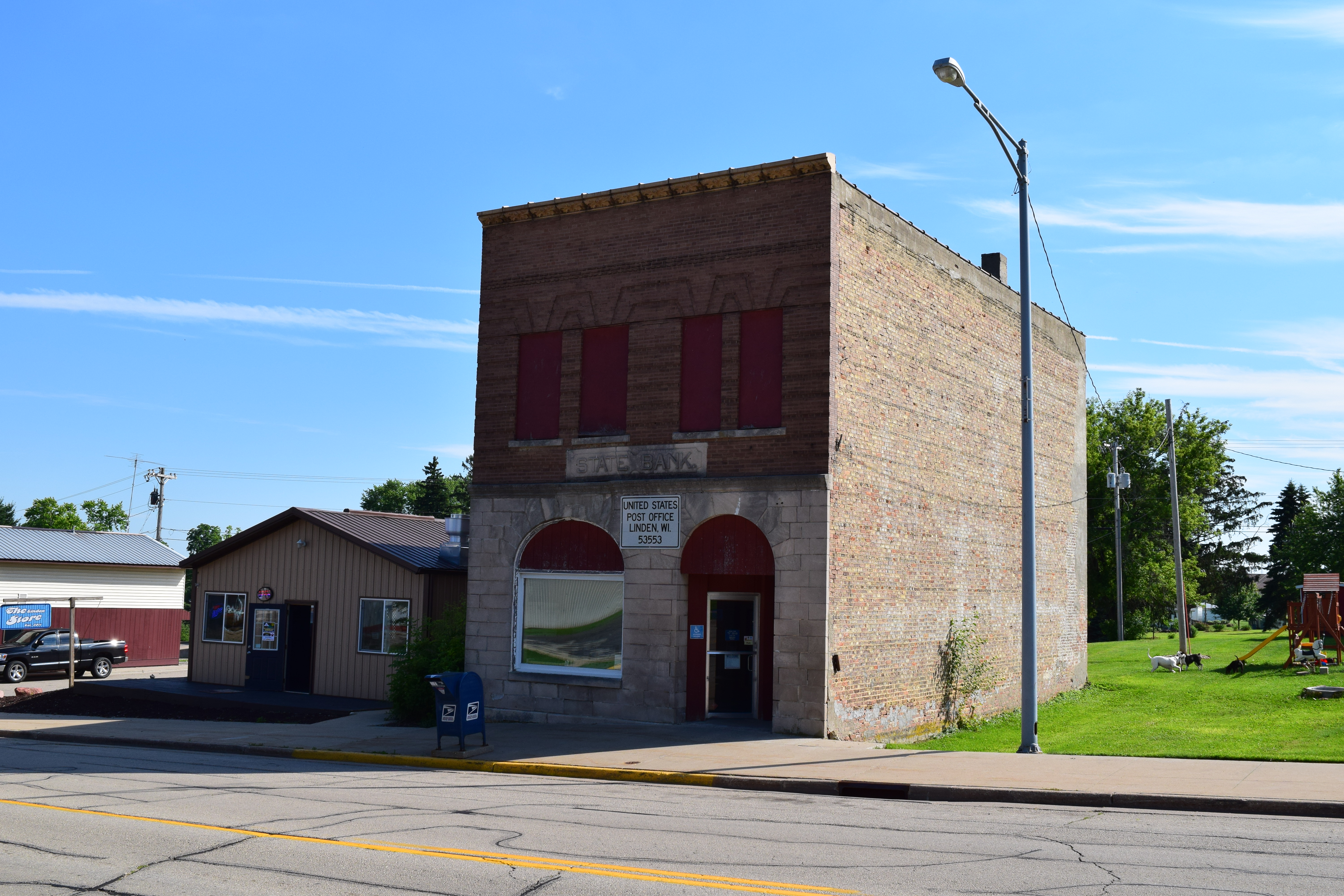
- Linden post office

- Location of Linden in Iowa County, Wisconsin.
- Coordinates: 42°55′21″N 90°15′46″W
- Country: United States
- State: Wisconsin
- County: Iowa

Area
  - Total: 0.78 sq mi (2.02 km^{2})
  - Land: 0.78 sq mi (2.02 km^{2})
  - Water: 0 sq mi (0.00 km^{2})
- Elevation: 1,099 ft (335 m)

Population (2020)
  - Total: 504
  - Density: 646/sq mi (250/km^{2})
- Time zone: UTC-6 (Central (CST))
  - Summer (DST): UTC-5 (CDT)
- Area code: 608
- FIPS code: 55-44650
- GNIS feature ID: 1568132
- Website: villageoflinden.com

Linden is a village in Iowa County, Wisconsin, United States. The population was 504 at the 2020 census. The village is located within the Town of Linden.

== Geography ==
Linden is located at 42°55′2″N 90°16′24″W (42.917433, -90.273384).

According to the United States Census Bureau, the village has a total area of 0.78 square miles (2.02 km^{2}), all land.

== Demographics ==
Historical population
Census	Pop.	Note	%±
1880	571		—
1890	462		−19.1%
1900	543		17.5%
1910	580		6.8%
1920	490		−15.5%
1930	498		1.6%
1940	461		−7.4%
1950	463		0.4%
1960	418		−9.7%
1970	408		−2.4%
1980	395		−3.2%
1990	429		8.6%
2000	615		43.4%
2010	549		−10.7%
2020	504		−8.2%
U.S. Decennial Census

=== 2010 census ===
As of the census of 2010, there were 549 people, 214 households, and 135 families living in the village. The population density was 703.8 inhabitants per square mile (271.7/km^{2}). There were 233 housing units at an average density of 298.7 per square mile (115.3/km^{2}). The racial makeup of the village was 97.6% White, 0.5% African American, 0.2% Native American, 0.7% from other races, and 0.9% from two or more races. Hispanic or Latino of any race were 1.1% of the population.

There were 214 households, of which 37.9% had children under the age of 18 living with them, 44.4% were married couples living together, 9.8% had a female householder with no husband present, 8.9% had a male householder with no wife present, and 36.9% were non-families. 28.5% of all households were made up of individuals, and 12.2% had someone living alone who was 65 years of age or older. The average household size was 2.57 and the average family size was 3.19.

The median age in the village was 36.4 years. 29% of residents were under the age of 18; 9.5% were between the ages of 18 and 24; 26.9% were from 25 to 44; 24.2% were from 45 to 64; and 10.6% were 65 years of age or older. The gender makeup of the village was 48.8% male and 51.2% female.

=== 2000 census ===
As of the census of 2000, there were 615 people, 223 households, and 158 families living in the village. The population density was 796.2 people per square mile (308.4/km^{2}). There were 234 housing units at an average density of 302.9 per square mile (117.3/km^{2}). The racial makeup of the village was 99.02% White, 0.16% Black or African American, 0.49% Native American, and 0.33% from two or more races. 0.00% of the population were Hispanic or Latino of any race.

There were 223 households, out of which 42.6% had children under the age of 18 living with them, 55.6% were married couples living together, 10.3% had a female householder with no husband present, and 29.1% were non-families. 23.8% of all households were made up of individuals, and 9.9% had someone living alone who was 65 years of age or older. The average household size was 2.76 and the average family size was 3.32.

In the village, the population was spread out, with 31.5% under the age of 18, 9.3% from 18 to 24, 34.5% from 25 to 44, 15.3% from 45 to 64, and 9.4% who were 65 years of age or older. The median age was 30 years. For every 100 females, there were 96.5 males. For every 100 females age 18 and over, there were 100.5 males.

The median income for a household in the village was $35,833, and the median income for a family was $48,750. Males had a median income of $29,250 versus $20,938 for females. The per capita income for the village was $16,331. About 6.8% of families and 8.8% of the population were below the poverty line, including 11.0% of those under age 18 and 13.6% of those age 65 or over.

== Notable people ==
- Edmund Baker, Wisconsin state legislator
- Kearton Coates, Wisconsin state legislator
- Oscar Hallam, justice of the Minnesota Supreme Court
- John Hammill, governor of Iowa

== See also ==
- List of villages in Wisconsin
