= Iowa County, Wisconsin =

County in Wisconsin, United States

- County
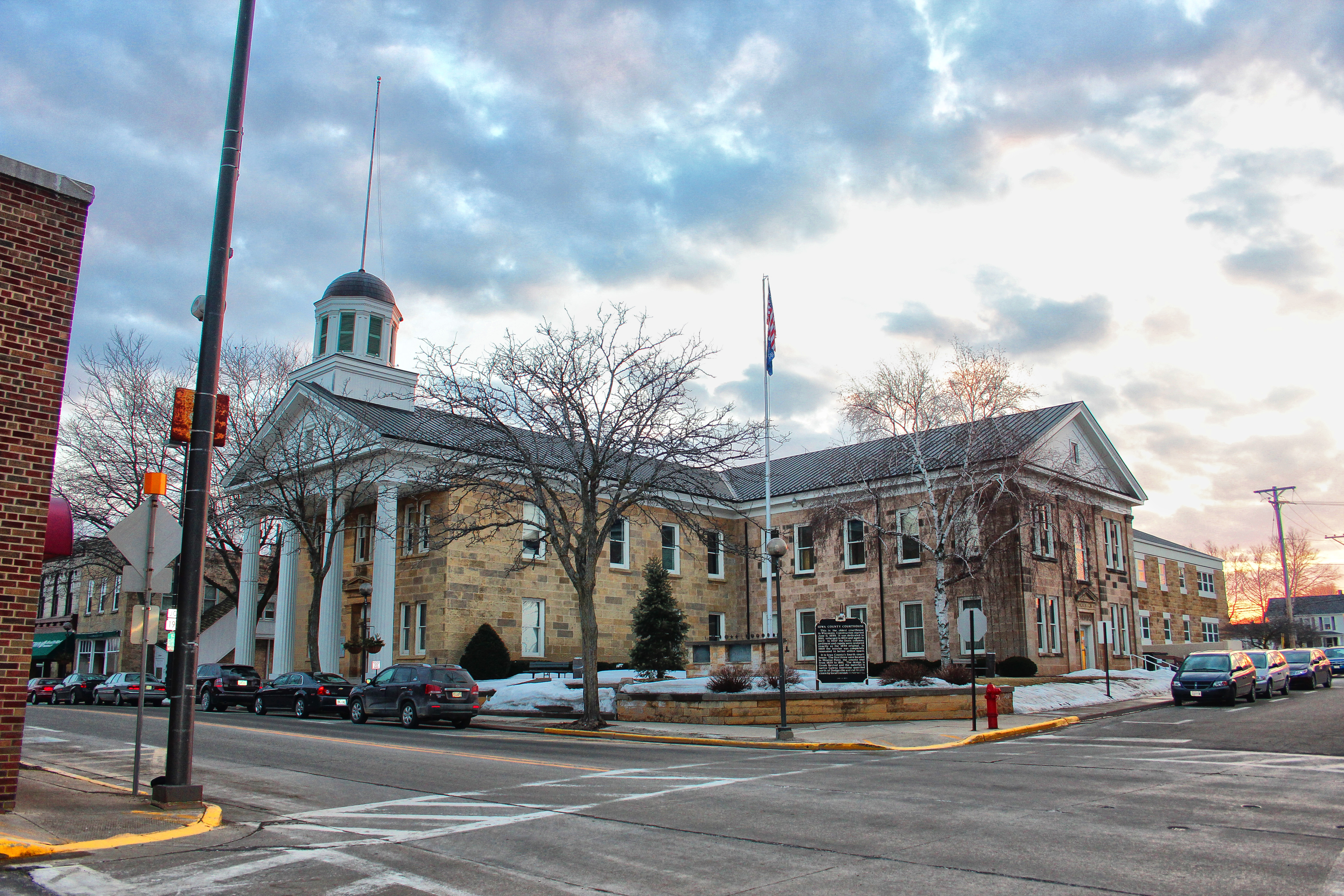
- Iowa County Courthouse in March 2013

- Location within the U.S. state of Wisconsin
- Coordinates: 43°00′N 90°08′W
- Country: United States
- State: Wisconsin
- Founded: 1830
- Named for: Iowa people
- Seat: Dodgeville
- Largest city: Dodgeville

Area
  - Total: 768 sq mi (1,990 km^{2})
  - Land: 763 sq mi (1,980 km^{2})
  - Water: 5.4 sq mi (14 km^{2}) 0.7%

Population (2020)
  - Total: 23,709
  - Estimate (2025): 23,951 ▲
  - Density: 31.1/sq mi (12.0/km^{2})
- Time zone: UTC−6 (Central)
  - Summer (DST): UTC−5 (CDT)
- Congressional district: 2nd
- Website: www.iowacountywi.gov

Iowa County is a county in the U.S. state of Wisconsin. As of the 2020 census, the population was 23,709. Its county seat and largest city is Dodgeville. When created, it was part of the Michigan Territory. Iowa County is part of the Madison, Wisconsin, Metropolitan Statistical Area.

== History ==
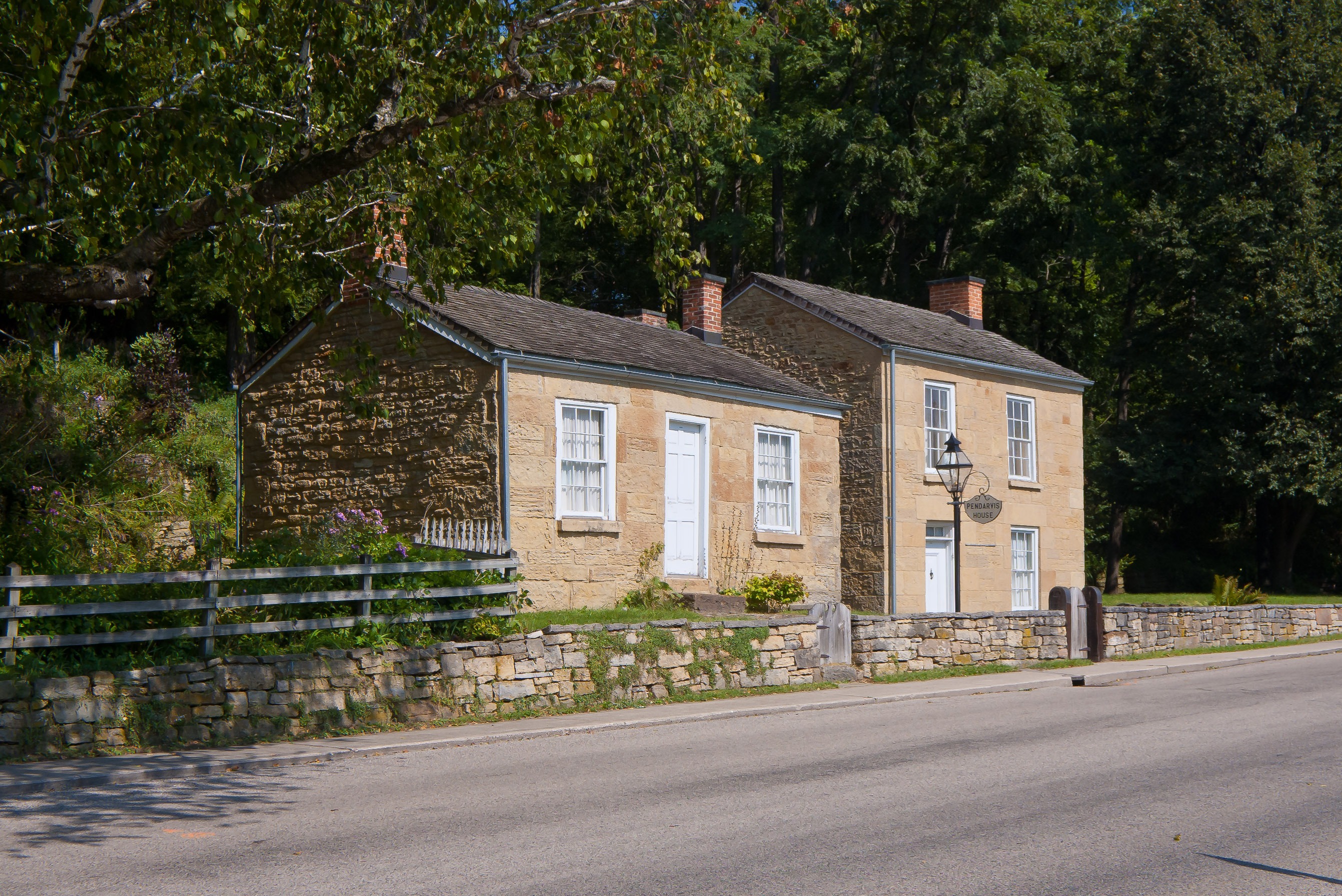
Pendarvis House (left) and Trelawny House (right) at the Pendarvis historic site

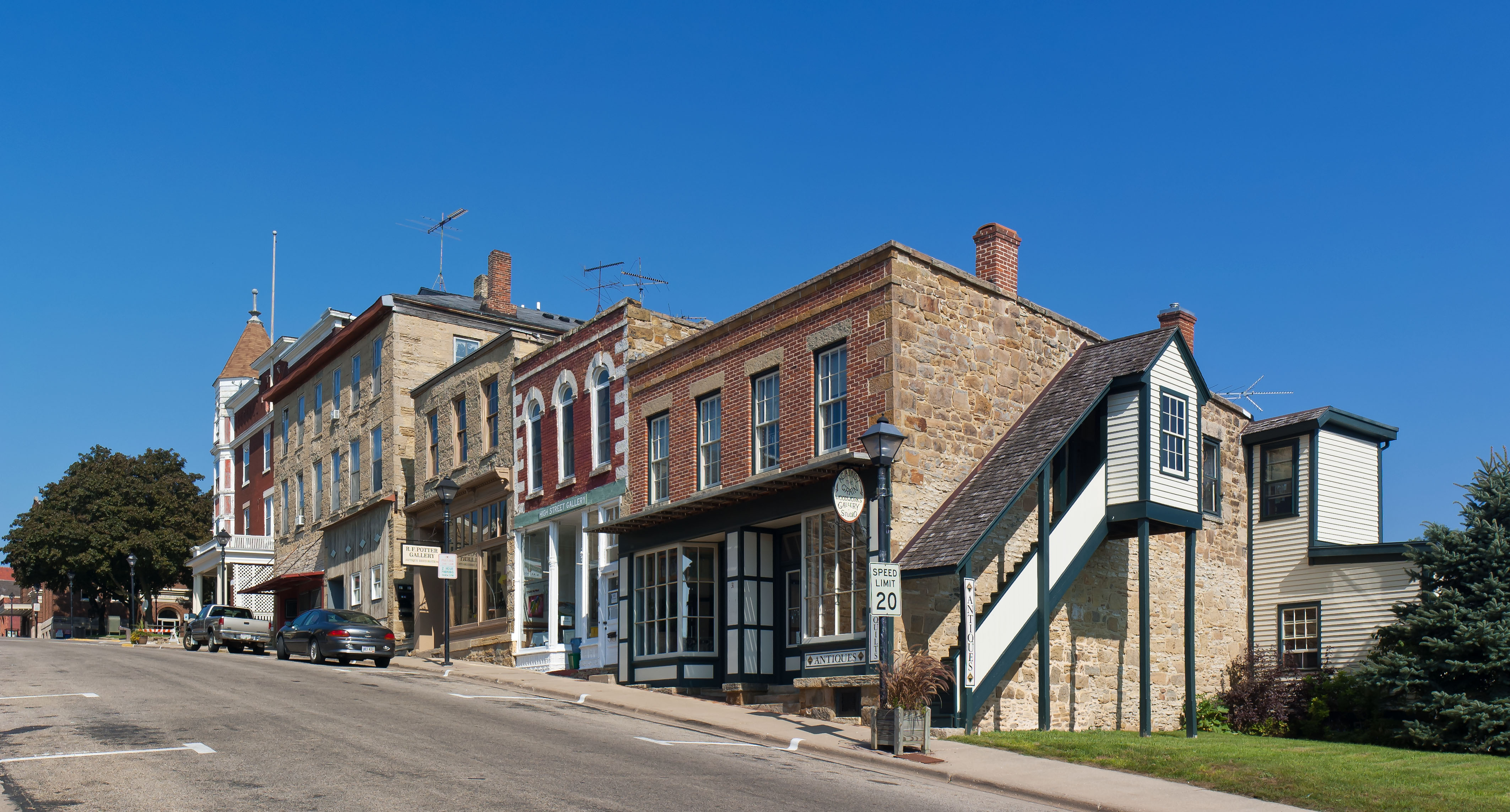
Mineral Point high street

The county organized under the Michigan Territory government in 1830. It was named for the Iowa tribe.

== Geography ==
According to the U.S. Census Bureau, the county has an area of 768 square miles (1,990 km^{2}), of which 763 square miles (1,980 km^{2}) is land and 5.4 square miles (14 km^{2}) (0.7%) is water. It is drained by tributaries of the Pecatonica River, which has its headwaters in the county. The highest point in the county is West Blue Mound at 1,716 ft. above sea level. The lowest point is the Wisconsin river at the Grant County line at 667 ft. above sea level.

=== Rivers and streams ===
- Harker Creek

=== Major highways ===
- U.S. Highway 14
- U.S. Highway 18
- U.S. Highway 151
- Highway 23 (Wisconsin)
- Highway 39 (Wisconsin)
- Highway 78 (Wisconsin)
- Highway 80 (Wisconsin)
- Highway 130 (Wisconsin)
- Highway 133 (Wisconsin)
- Highway 191 (Wisconsin)

=== Railroads ===
- Wisconsin and Southern Railroad

=== Buses ===
Iowa County is served by Lamers Connect which offers two buses a day, one traveling east to Madison and Milwaukee and one west to Dubuque via its Dodgeville stop.

=== Airport ===
- Iowa County Airport (KMRJ) serves the county and surrounding communities.

== Adjacent counties ==
- Richland County - northwest
- Sauk County - northeast
- Dane County - east
- Green County - southeast
- Lafayette County - south
- Grant County - west

== Demographics ==
Historical population
Census	Pop.	Note	%±
1840	3,978		—
1850	9,525		139.4%
1860	18,967		99.1%
1870	24,544		29.4%
1880	23,628		−3.7%
1890	22,117		−6.4%
1900	23,114		4.5%
1910	22,497		−2.7%
1920	21,504		−4.4%
1930	20,039		−6.8%
1940	20,595		2.8%
1950	19,610		−4.8%
1960	19,631		0.1%
1970	19,306		−1.7%
1980	19,802		2.6%
1990	20,150		1.8%
2000	22,780		13.1%
2010	23,687		4.0%
2020	23,709		0.1%
2025 (est.)	23,951	▲	1.0%
U.S. Decennial Census; 1790–1960 1900–1990; 1990–2000 2010 2020

=== Racial and ethnic composition ===
Iowa County, Wisconsin – Racial and ethnic composition Note: the US Census treats Hispanic/Latino as an ethnic category. This table excludes Latinos from the racial categories and assigns them to a separate category. Hispanics/Latinos may be of any race.
Race / Ethnicity (NH = Non-Hispanic)	Pop 1980	Pop 1990	Pop 2000	Pop 2010	Pop 2020	% 1980	% 1990	% 2000	% 2010	% 2020
White alone (NH)	19,680	20,051	22,428	22,904	22,203	99.38%	99.51%	98.45%	96.69%	93.65%
Black or African American alone (NH)	10	7	36	86	114	0.05%	0.03%	0.16%	0.36%	0.48%
Native American or Alaska Native alone (NH)	29	20	25	35	26	0.15%	0.10%	0.11%	0.15%	0.11%
Asian alone (NH)	27	19	78	124	178	0.14%	0.09%	0.34%	0.52%	0.75%
Native Hawaiian or Pacific Islander alone (NH)	x	x	3	5	12	x	x	0.01%	0.02%	0.05%
Other race alone (NH)	5	5	12	12	50	0.03%	0.02%	0.05%	0.05%	0.21%
Mixed race or Multiracial (NH)	x	x	123	185	671	x	x	0.54%	0.78%	2.83%
Hispanic or Latino (any race)	51	48	75	336	455	0.26%	0.24%	0.33%	1.42%	1.92%
Total	19,802	20,150	22,780	23,687	23,709	100.00%	100.00%	100.00%	100.00%	100.00%

=== 2020 census ===
As of the 2020 census, the county had a population of 23,709, a median age of 44.5 years, 22.2% of residents were under the age of 18, and 20.1% of residents were 65 years of age or older. For every 100 females there were 101.1 males, and for every 100 females age 18 and over there were 99.2 males.

The population density was 31.1 people per square mile (12.0 people/km^{2}). There were 10,905 housing units at an average density of 14.3 units per square mile (5.5 units/km^{2}).

There were 9,901 households in the county, of which 27.7% had children under the age of 18 living in them. Of all households, 53.4% were married-couple households, 17.6% were households with a male householder and no spouse or partner present, and 20.8% were households with a female householder and no spouse or partner present. About 27.2% of all households were made up of individuals and 12.1% had someone living alone who was 65 years of age or older.

There were 10,905 housing units, of which 9.2% were vacant. Among occupied housing units, 76.3% were owner-occupied and 23.7% were renter-occupied. The homeowner vacancy rate was 0.8% and the rental vacancy rate was 6.0%.

The racial makeup of the county was 94.2% White, 0.5% Black or African American, 0.2% American Indian and Alaska Native, 0.8% Asian, 0.1% Native Hawaiian and Pacific Islander, 0.9% from some other race, and 3.5% from two or more races. Hispanic or Latino residents of any race comprised 1.9% of the population.

20.7% of residents lived in urban areas, while 79.3% lived in rural areas.

=== 2000 census ===
2000 Census Age Pyramid for Iowa County.

As of the census of 2000, there were 22,780 people, 8,764 households, and 6,213 families residing in the county. The population density was 30 people per square mile (12 people/km^{2}). There were 9,579 housing units at an average density of 13 units per square mile (5.0 units/km^{2}). The racial makeup of the county was 98.70% White, 0.17% Black or African American, 0.11% Native American, 0.34% Asian, 0.01% Pacific Islander, 0.11% from other races, and 0.55% from two or more races. 0.33% of the population were Hispanic or Latino of any race. 33.6% were of German, 17.2% Norwegian, 11.6% English, 11.3% Irish and 7.9% American ancestry.

There were 8,764 households, out of which 34.60% had children under the age of 18 living with them, 59.50% were married couples living together, 7.60% had a female householder with no husband present, and 29.10% were non-families. 24.30% of all households were made up of individuals, and 10.10% had someone living alone who was 65 years of age or older. The average household size was 2.56 and the average family size was 3.06.

In the county, the population was spread out, with 27.10% under the age of 18, 6.60% from 18 to 24, 30.40% from 25 to 44, 22.50% from 45 to 64, and 13.30% who were 65 years of age or older. The median age was 37 years. For every 100 females, there were 99.30 males. For every 100 females age 18 and over, there were 97.70 males.

== Politics ==
United States presidential election results for Iowa County, Wisconsin
Year	Republican		Democratic		Third party(ies)	
Year	No.	%	No.	%	No.	%
1892	2,274	45.53%	2,336	46.77%	385	7.71%
1896	3,115	57.42%	2,060	37.97%	250	4.61%
1900	3,270	62.51%	1,743	33.32%	218	4.17%
1904	3,328	64.58%	1,639	31.81%	186	3.61%
1908	2,986	56.18%	2,077	39.08%	252	4.74%
1912	1,886	40.26%	2,103	44.90%	695	14.84%
1916	2,271	48.78%	2,230	47.90%	155	3.33%
1920	5,428	81.42%	942	14.13%	297	4.45%
1924	3,291	40.07%	689	8.39%	4,233	51.54%
1928	5,484	63.26%	3,129	36.09%	56	0.65%
1932	3,113	39.63%	4,621	58.82%	122	1.55%
1936	3,623	39.84%	4,988	54.85%	483	5.31%
1940	4,978	54.46%	4,025	44.04%	137	1.50%
1944	4,608	56.00%	3,585	43.57%	35	0.43%
1948	3,745	48.05%	3,917	50.26%	132	1.69%
1952	6,211	69.38%	2,722	30.41%	19	0.21%
1956	5,201	61.79%	3,176	37.73%	40	0.48%
1960	5,143	59.16%	3,547	40.80%	4	0.05%
1964	3,275	41.42%	4,620	58.43%	12	0.15%
1968	4,005	54.03%	2,897	39.08%	511	6.89%
1972	4,387	57.53%	3,131	41.06%	108	1.42%
1976	4,195	48.34%	4,252	49.00%	231	2.66%
1980	4,068	45.24%	4,154	46.20%	770	8.56%
1984	4,983	56.01%	3,843	43.19%	71	0.80%
1988	4,240	49.60%	4,268	49.93%	40	0.47%
1992	3,288	32.39%	4,467	44.01%	2,396	23.60%
1996	2,866	32.14%	4,690	52.60%	1,360	15.25%
2000	4,221	40.04%	5,842	55.42%	478	4.53%
2004	5,348	42.64%	7,122	56.79%	72	0.57%
2008	3,829	31.99%	7,987	66.73%	153	1.28%
2012	4,287	34.20%	8,105	64.66%	142	1.13%
2016	4,809	39.18%	6,669	54.33%	797	6.49%
2020	5,909	42.23%	7,828	55.95%	255	1.82%
2024	6,631	45.18%	7,750	52.80%	296	2.02%

Iowa County historically tilted Republican for much of the 20th century. However, it has swung heavily to the Democrats since the 1970s. It has supported the Democratic presidential candidate in all but one election since 1976, and is one of the most Democratic counties in Wisconsin. However, Donald Trump's 2024 performance of over 45% was the best by a Republican since George H. W. Bush lost the county by only 28 votes in 1988. This was also the first time since 1988 that a Republican held a Democratic winner of the county to a single-digit margin of victory.

== Parks and recreation ==
The county has several parks, including Arena Pines-Sand Barrens State Natural Area, Pine Cliff State Natural Area, Blue Mound State Park, Tower Hill State Park, Black Hawk Lake Recreation Area and Governor Dodge State Park.

== Communities ==
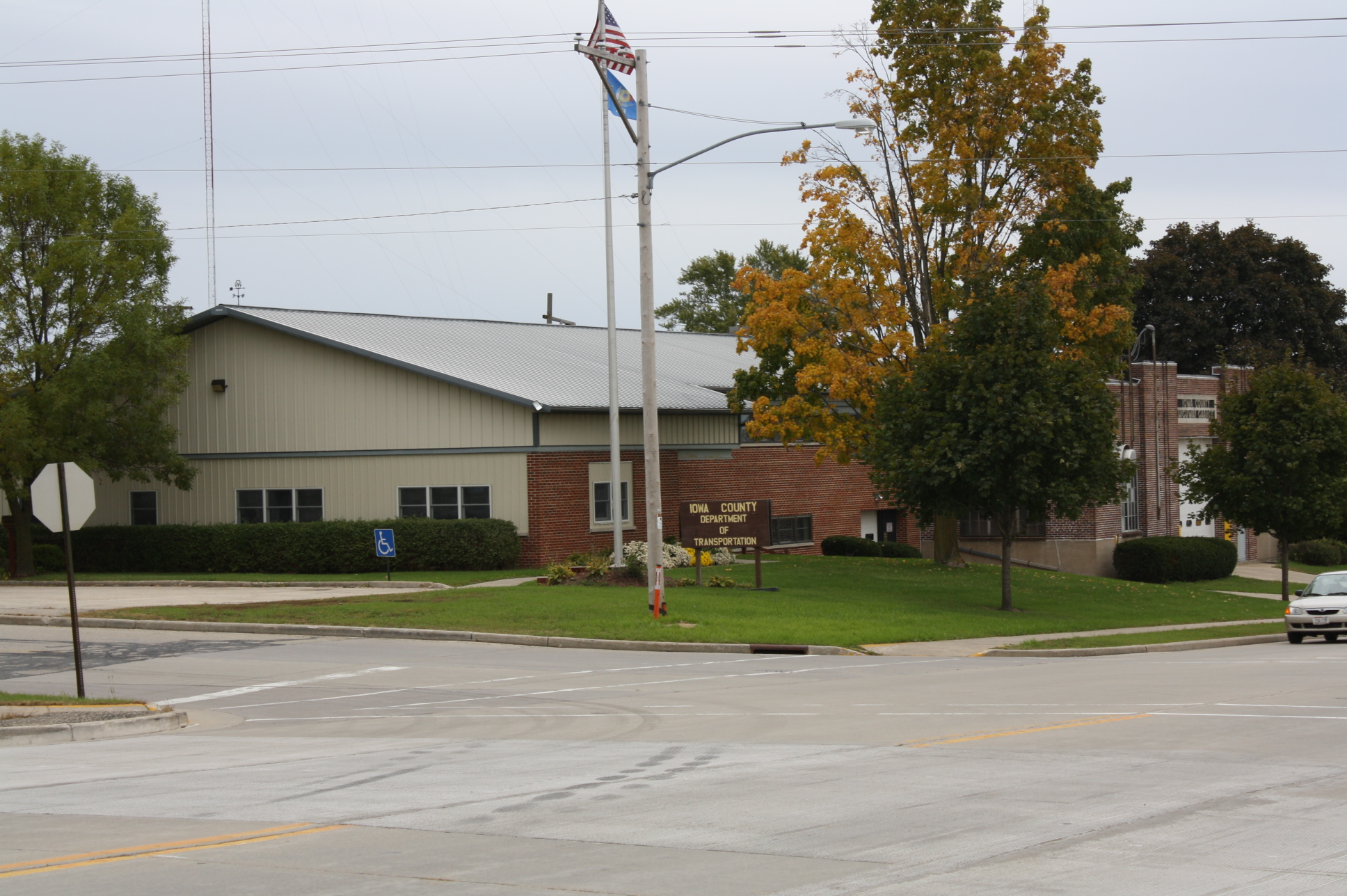
Iowa County Department of Transportation building in Dodgeville

=== Cities ===
- Dodgeville (county seat)
- Mineral Point

=== Villages ===
- Arena
- Avoca
- Barneveld
- Blanchardville (mostly in Lafayette County)
- Cobb
- Highland
- Hollandale
- Linden
- Livingston (mostly in Grant County)
- Montfort (mostly in Grant County)
- Muscoda (mostly in Grant County)
- Rewey
- Ridgeway

=== Towns ===
- Arena
- Brigham
- Clyde
- Dodgeville
- Eden
- Highland
- Linden
- Mifflin
- Mineral Point
- Moscow
- Pulaski
- Ridgeway
- Waldwick
- Wyoming

=== Census-designated place ===
- Edmund

=== Unincorporated communities ===
- Clyde
- Coon Rock
- Helena
- Hyde
- Jonesdale
- Middlebury
- Mifflin
- Moscow
- Pleasant Ridge
- Waldwick
- Wyoming

=== Ghost towns ===
- Adamsville
- Dirty Hollow
- Minersville
- Pendarvis

== Notable people ==
- Gilbert L. Laws, Nebraska Secretary of State and US Congressman

== See also ==
- National Register of Historic Places listings in Iowa County, Wisconsin
- Wisconsin State Natural Areas Program
