= Arena (town), Wisconsin =

Town in Wisconsin, United States

Arena, Wisconsin
- Town
- Town of Arena
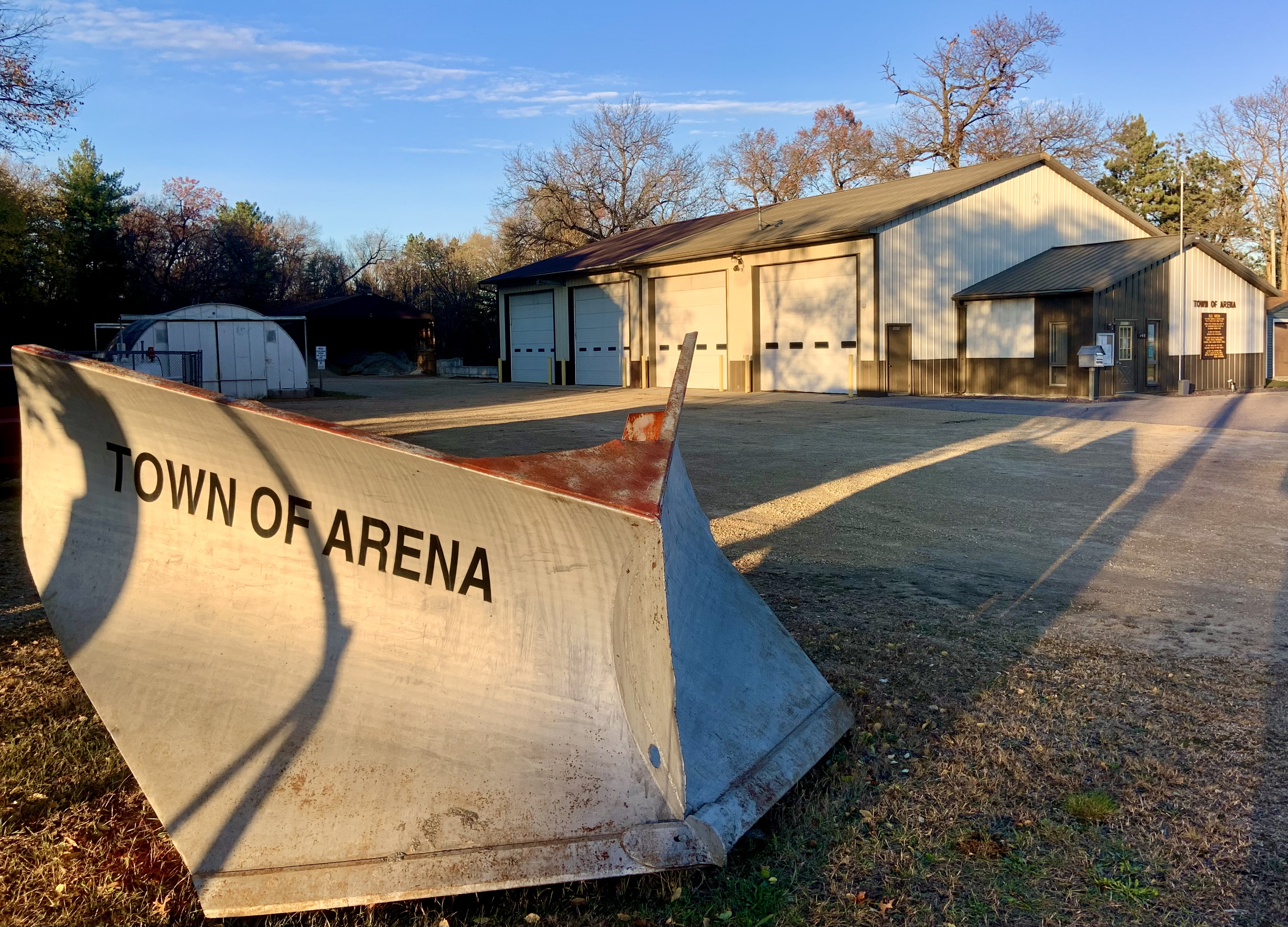

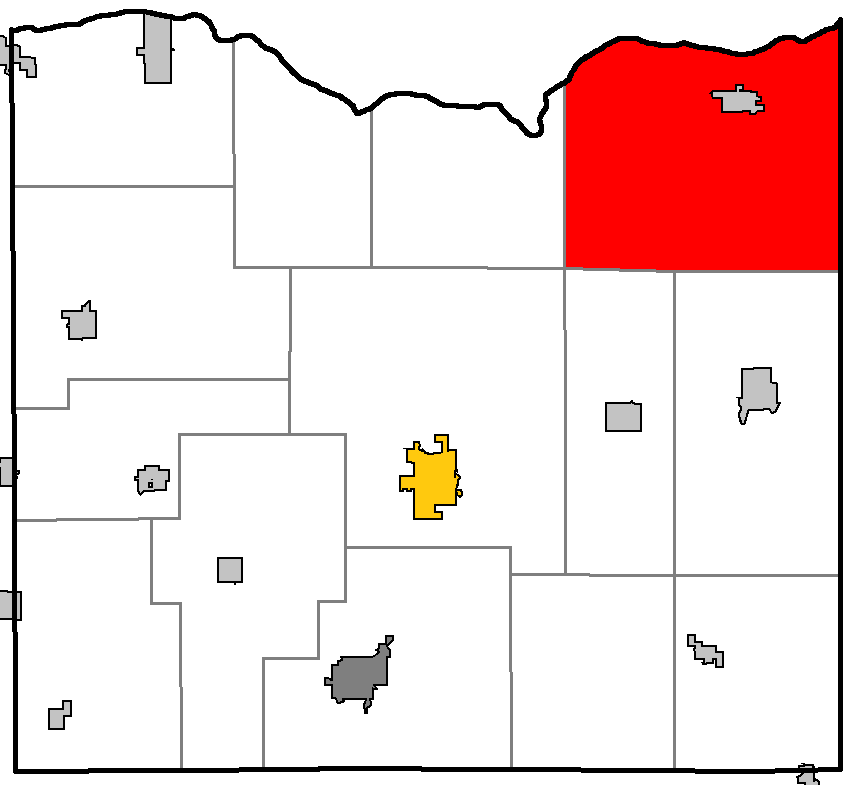
- Location of Arena, within Iowa County, Wisconsin

- Location of Iowa County, Wisconsin
- Coordinates: 43°08′42″N 89°55′46″W
- Country: United States
- State: Wisconsin
- County: Iowa

Area
  - Total: 79.47 sq mi (205.8 km^{2})
  - Land: 78.0 sq mi (202 km^{2})
  - Water: 1.47 sq mi (3.8 km^{2})

Population (2020)
  - Total: 1,486
  - Density: 19.1/sq mi (7.36/km^{2})
- Time zone: UTC-6 (Central (CST))
  - Summer (DST): UTC-5 (CDT)
- Area code(s): 608 and 353
- GNIS feature ID: 1582708
- Website: https://www.townofarena.org/

The Town of Arena is a town located in Iowa County, Wisconsin, United States. The population was 1,486 at the 2020 census. The Village of Arena is located within the town. The unincorporated communities of Coon Rock, and Helena are also located within the town.

== Geography ==
According to the United States Census Bureau, the town has a total area of 79.5 square miles (205.9 km^{2}), of which 78.0 square miles (202.1 km^{2}) is land and 1.5 square miles (3.8 km^{2}, 1.84%) is water.

== Demographics ==
As of the census of 2000, there were 1,444 people, 545 households, and 419 families residing in the town. The population density was 18.5 people per square mile (7.1/km^{2}). There were 617 housing units at an average density of 7.9 per square mile (3.1/km^{2}). The racial makeup of the town was 99.10% White, 0.07% Black or African American, 0.48% Asian, 0.07% from other races, and 0.28% from two or more races. 0.69% of the population were Hispanic or Latino of any race.

There were 545 households, out of which 31.7% had children under the age of 18 living with them, 67.9% were married couples living together, 5.3% had a female householder with no husband present, and 23.1% were non-families. 17.8% of all households were made up of individuals, and 5.7% had someone living alone who was 65 years of age or older. The average household size was 2.65 and the average family size was 3.00.

In the town, the population was spread out, with 24.4% under the age of 18, 6.6% from 18 to 24, 30.6% from 25 to 44, 29.3% from 45 to 64, and 9.1% who were 65 years of age or older. The median age was 39 years. For every 100 females, there were 104.0 males. For every 100 females age 18 and over, there were 104.3 males.

The median income for a household in the town was $51,042, and the median income for a family was $54,844. Males had a median income of $35,341 versus $26,691 for females. The per capita income for the town was $20,060. About 4.8% of families and 6.7% of the population were below the poverty line, including 8.6% of those under age 18 and 6.6% of those age 65 or over.

== Notable people ==
- Robert McCutchin, Wisconsin State Representative and farmer, was born and lived in the town
