= Ridgeway, Wisconsin =

- Village
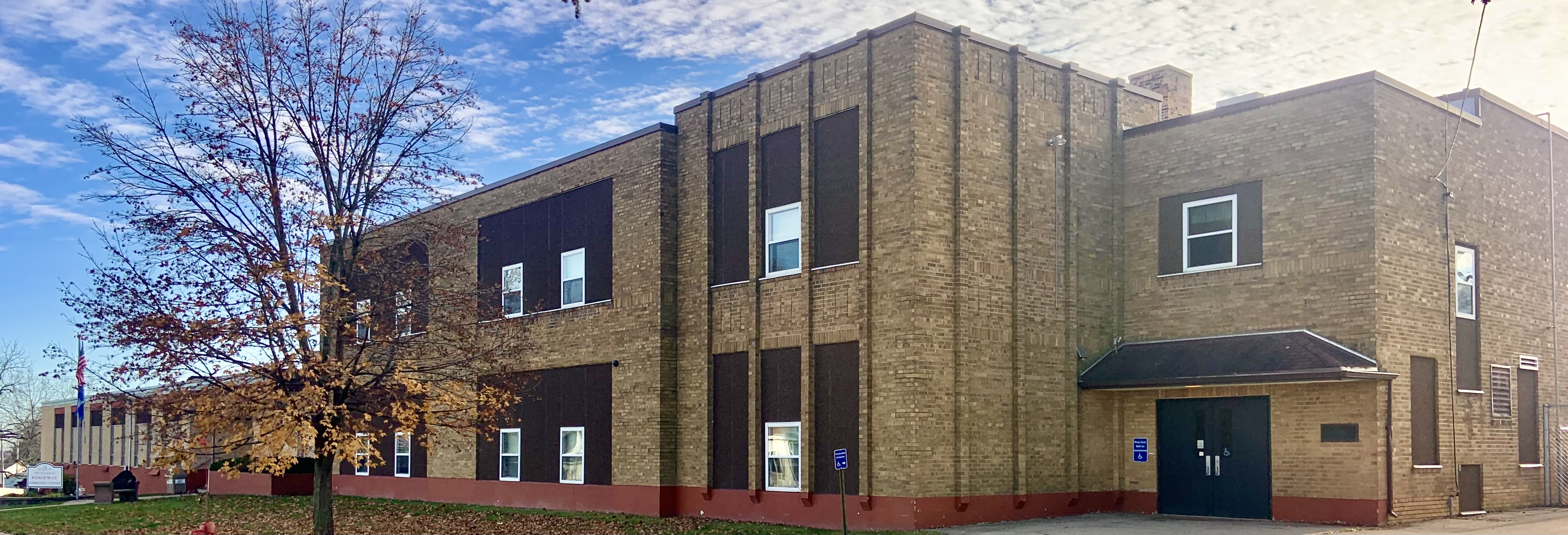
- Village hall

- Location of Ridgeway in Iowa County, Wisconsin.
- Coordinates: 42°59′35″N 89°58′50″W
- Country: United States
- State: Wisconsin
- County: Iowa

Area
  - Total: 1.25 sq mi (3.23 km^{2})
  - Land: 1.25 sq mi (3.23 km^{2})
  - Water: 0 sq mi (0.00 km^{2})
- Elevation: 1,076 ft (328 m)

Population (2020)
  - Total: 624
  - Density: 505.6/sq mi (195.22/km^{2})
- Time zone: UTC-6 (Central (CST))
  - Summer (DST): UTC-5 (CDT)
- Area code: 608
- FIPS code: 55-67900
- GNIS feature ID: 1572305
- Website: www.ridgewaywi.gov

Ridgeway is a village in Iowa County, Wisconsin, United States. The population was 624 at the 2020 census. The village is adjacent to the Town of Ridgeway. It is part of the Madison Metropolitan Statistical Area.

== Geography ==
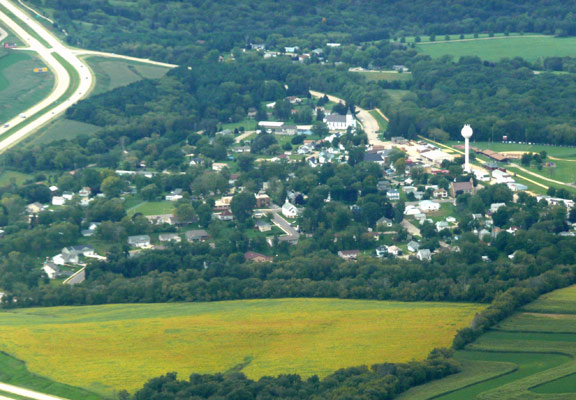

Ridgeway is located at 42°59′56″N 89°59′32″W (42.99915, -89.992326).

According to the United States Census Bureau, the village has a total area of 1.26 square miles (3.26 km^{2}), all land.

== Demographics ==
Historical population
Census	Pop.	Note	%±
1910	437		—
1920	428		−2.1%
1930	365		−14.7%
1940	431		18.1%
1950	410		−4.9%
1960	455		11.0%
1970	463		1.8%
1980	503		8.6%
1990	577		14.7%
2000	689		19.4%
2010	653		−5.2%
2020	624		−4.4%
U.S. Decennial Census

=== 2010 census ===
As of the census of 2010, there were 653 people, 267 households, and 164 families living in the village. The population density was 518.3 inhabitants per square mile (200.1/km^{2}). There were 293 housing units at an average density of 232.5 per square mile (89.8/km^{2}). The racial makeup of the village was 98.8% White, 0.9% from other races, and 0.3% from two or more races. Hispanic or Latino of any race were 5.1% of the population.

There were 267 households, of which 33.0% had children under the age of 18 living with them, 47.2% were married couples living together, 8.2% had a female householder with no husband present, 6.0% had a male householder with no wife present, and 38.6% were non-families. 29.6% of all households were made up of individuals, and 10.4% had someone living alone who was 65 years of age or older. The average household size was 2.41 and the average family size was 3.01.

The median age in the village was 35.8 years. 23.3% of residents were under the age of 18; 11.1% were between the ages of 18 and 24; 27.9% were from 25 to 44; 26.9% were from 45 to 64; and 10.7% were 65 years of age or older. The gender makeup of the village was 54.1% male and 45.9% female.

=== 2000 census ===
As of the census of 2000, there were 689 people, 274 households, and 180 families living in the village. The population density was 545.0 people per square mile (211.1/km^{2}). There were 286 housing units at an average density of 226.2 per square mile (87.6/km^{2}). The racial makeup of the village was 98.26% White, 0.15% Native American, 1.31% Asian, and 0.29% from two or more races. 0.00% of the population were Hispanic or Latino of any race.

There were 274 households, out of which 33.9% had children under the age of 18 living with them, 50.7% were married couples living together, 10.9% had a female householder with no husband present, and 34.3% were non-families. 27.4% of all households were made up of individuals, and 9.5% had someone living alone who was 65 years of age or older. The average household size was 2.49 and the average family size was 3.04.

In the village, the population was spread out, with 26.1% under the age of 18, 8.1% from 18 to 24, 34.5% from 25 to 44, 20.9% from 45 to 64, and 10.3% who were 65 years of age or older. The median age was 36 years. For every 100 females, there were 101.5 males. For every 100 females age 18 and over, there were 99.6 males.

The median income for a household in the village was $41,548, and the median income for a family was $50,795. Males had a median income of $32,250 versus $22,308 for females. The per capita income for the village was $17,887. About 3.6% of families and 10.8% of the population were below the poverty line, including 15.1% of those under age 18 and 14.5% of those age 65 or over.

== Notable residents ==
- Thomas Grant Cretney, Wisconsin State Representative
- Tom Davis, basketball coach, was born in Ridgeway.
- Evan Lewis, professional wrestler, first American Heavyweight Champion, member of the Professional Wrestling Hall of Fame and Museum and Wrestling Observer Newsletter Hall of Fame
- David Morris, Wisconsin State Representative
- Joel Whitman, Wisconsin State Senator
