= Cave of the Mounds =

Natural limestone cave in Wisconsin

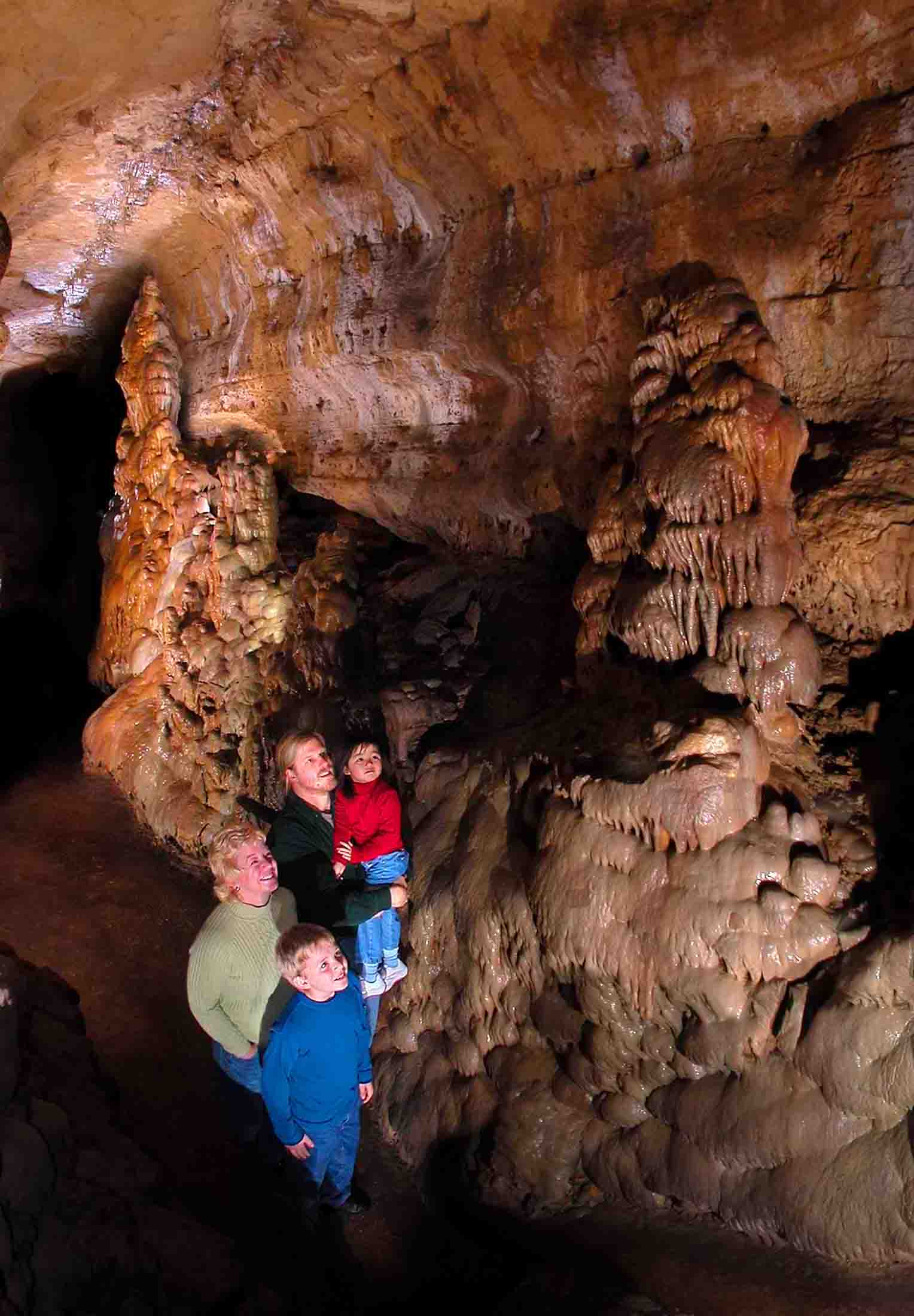
- Inside Cave of the Mounds

- Location within Wisconsin Location within the United States
- Location: Blue Mounds, Wisconsin
- Coordinates: 43°01′05″N 89°48′58″W
- Designated: 1987
- Website: Official website

Cave of the Mounds, a natural limestone cave located near Blue Mounds, Wisconsin, United States, is named for two nearby hills called the Blue Mounds. It is located in the southern slope of the east hill. The cave's beauty comes from its many varieties of mineral formations called speleothems. The Chicago Academy of Sciences considers the Cave of the Mounds to be "the significant cave of the upper Midwest" because of its beauty, and it is promoted as the "jewel box" of major American caves. In 1987, the United States Department of the Interior and the National Park Service designated the cave as a National Natural Landmark.

== History ==
The limestone from which the cave was carved began forming approximately 488 million years ago, during the Ordovician Period. During this time, much of North America was covered with warm, shallow seas. Over millions of years, calcium carbonate shells from tiny marine organisms accumulated on the sea floor, forming enormous quantities of limestone. The type of limestone in which the cave was formed is called galena dolomite because of its high concentration of the lead ore galena.

The cave began forming about a million to a million and a half years ago, in a manner similar to many caves. A large crack in the surface of the rock, called the cave's "lifeline", allowed rain water to seep into the stone. In the air, rain combines with carbon dioxide to form a weak carbonic acid. Though this acid is not very strong, it is strong enough to dissolve away the limestone after it seeps in through the "lifeline". Over time, large cavities were dissolved in the stone and as the water table dropped, the water drained out and the cavities filled with air. Now that the cavities are filled with air instead of water, the water droplets coming from the "lifeline", which are saturated with dissolved calcium carbonate, deposit solid calcium carbonate, which builds up over time to create speleothems. This is a very gradual process, usually taking 50 to 150 years to form one cubic inch of material, and continues to this day.

The area around the Blue Mounds, Dane County, was first settled by Europeans in 1828 by Ebenezer Brigham, a successful lead miner from Massachusetts. He had traveled to Wisconsin to join in the lead rush of the late 1820s. After arriving, he set up operations just north of where the cave lies today. Ebenezer's house later became a trading post, an inn, a stagecoach stop, and the first post office in Dane County. Ebenezer Brigham later became a colonel and helped build and command Fort Blue Mounds during the Blackhawk War. He died after a long life, not knowing that a beautiful cave existed beneath his Brigham Farm.

On August 4, 1939, Cave of the Mounds was discovered accidentally when limestone quarry workers blasted a section of the quarry and exposed an opening to the cave. Work at the quarry then immediately stopped and was never continued. Soon after, the cave was closed to prevent damage from curious souvenir seekers who removed pieces of stalactites and stalagmites to take home. There are still foot-sized holes in the flowstone left by these early explorers. The cave was reopened in May, 1940 under the supervision of Alonzo W. Pond after lights and wooden walkways were installed. (Pond's Illustrated Guidebook of the Newly Discovered Cave of the Mounds (1941) was the first speleological publication about the cave, written primarily for tourists.) Since then, the wooden walkways have been replaced with concrete ones to accommodate the many visitors. Theatrical lighting, original design by Gilbert Vaughn Hemsley Jr. has also been installed to further highlight the colors and shapes inside the cave. In 1987, the cave was designated a National Natural Landmark by the United States Department of the Interior and the National Park Service. To be considered a NNL, "a site must be one of the best examples of a natural region's characteristic biotic or geologic features."

== Formations ==
Cave of the Mounds is home to many varieties of speleothems. As with most caves, stalactites and stalagmites are common. Formations found inside the cave include:

- Soda straws – Soda straws are formations characterized by thin, hollow tubes made of minerals. They have the potential to form into stalactites if the holes at the bottom of them become plugged.
- Flowstones – Flowstones are created when water travels along a surface and deposits minerals. In limestone caves, flowstones are generally the most common type of formation.
- Curtains – These are formed when water droplets run along the ceiling of the cave and gradually form sheets of minerals.
- Lily pads – Lily pads are created when water droplets fall into a puddle and create a formation on the surface reminiscent of a lily pad.
- Helictites – Helictites are an unusual form of stalactite that grow with bends or angles in them that seem to defy gravity. Their strange growth style is most likely caused by capillary forces acting on the water droplets.
- Oolites – Also called "cave pearls", they are a beautiful but rare speleothem. These are spherical formations made when a droplet falls onto some sand and calcite forms around the sand, much like the way a pearl is formed.

These formations come in many different brilliant colors such as reds, browns, blues, and grays. The reds and browns are caused by the presence of iron oxide in the formation. Similarly, blues and grays are caused by manganese oxide. Some speleothems are even partially luminescent and give off light for a brief period after exposure to another light.

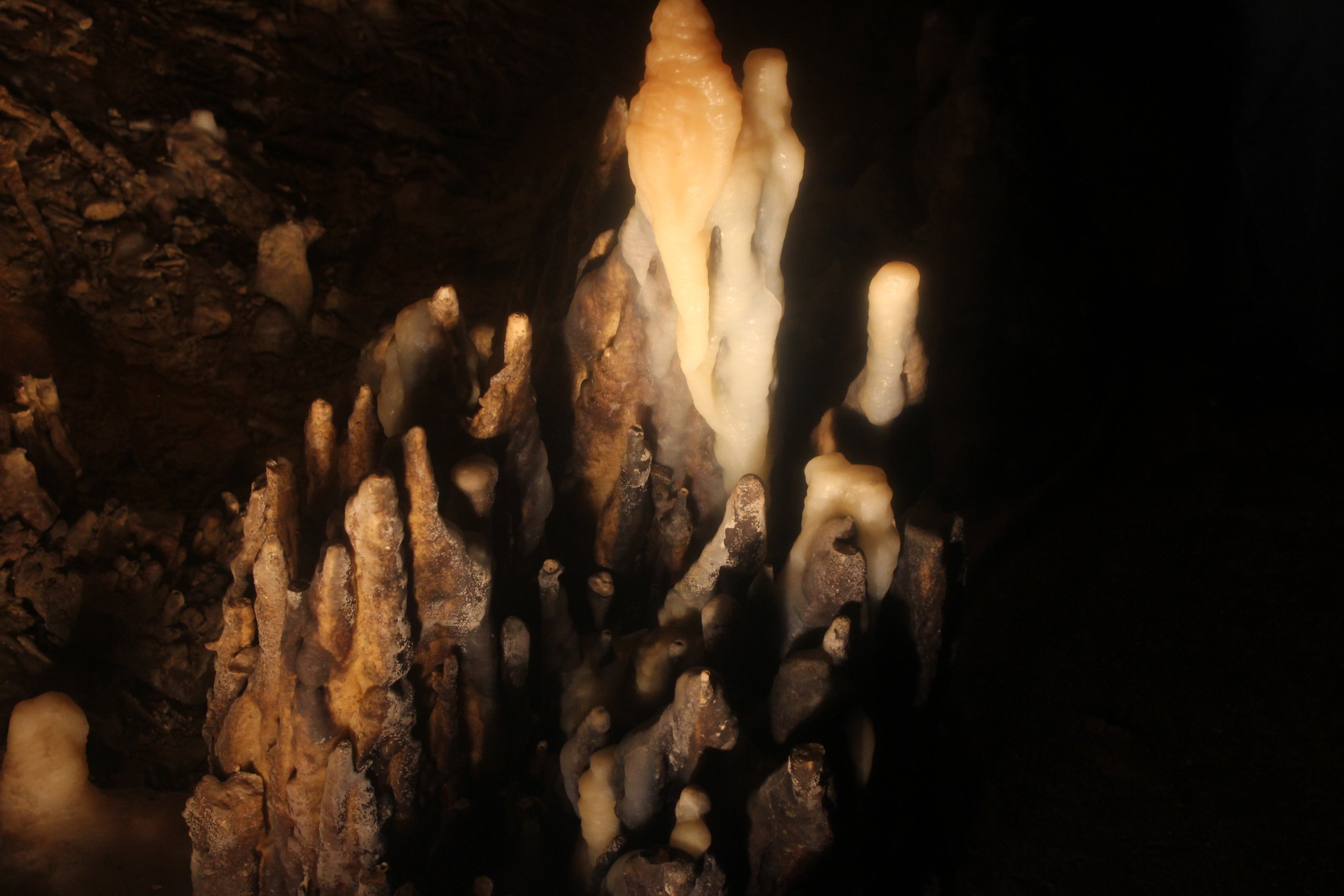
Stalactite that fell thousands of years ago and is now in the midst of stalagmites

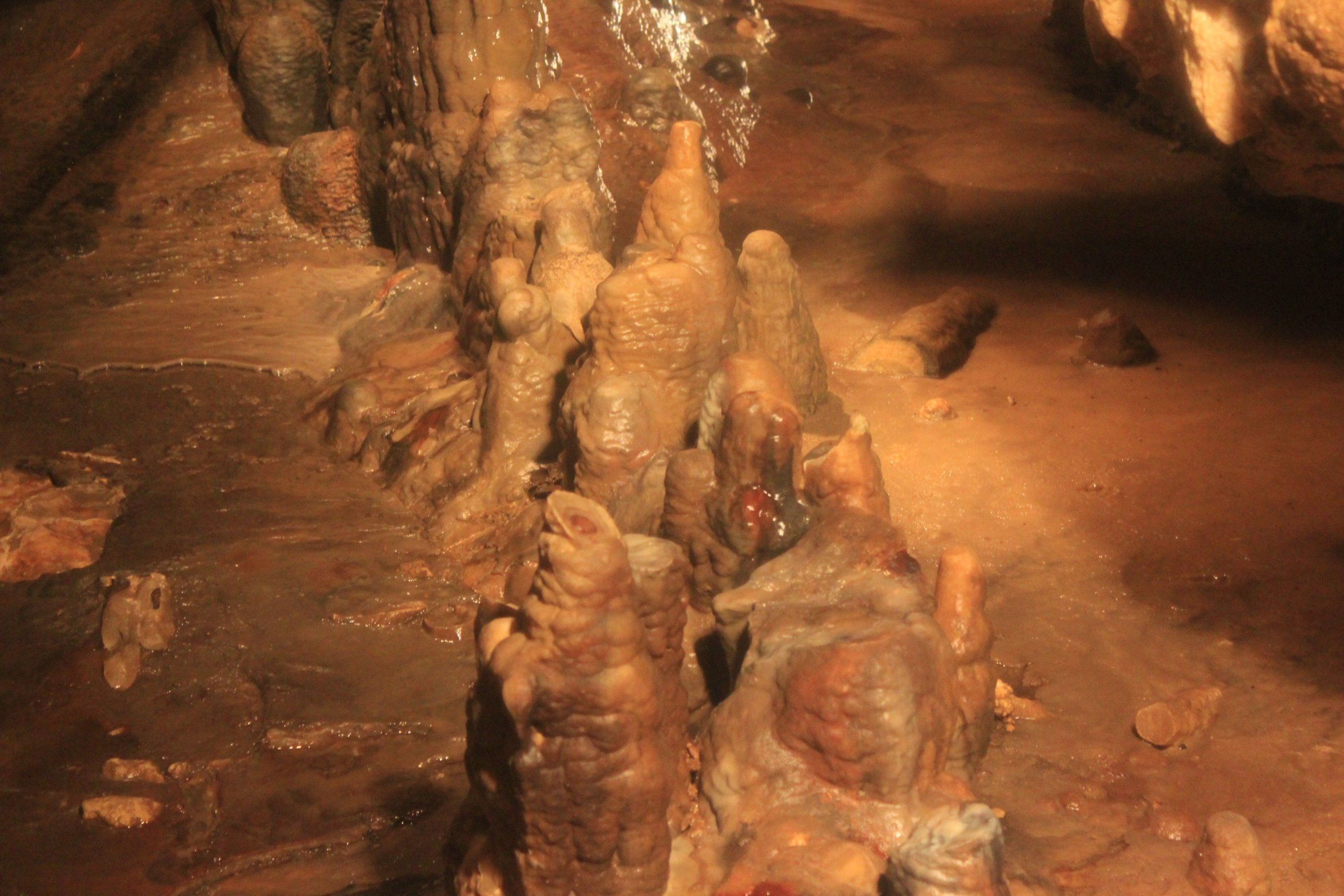
A series of stalagmites growing on the ground in one of the display rooms

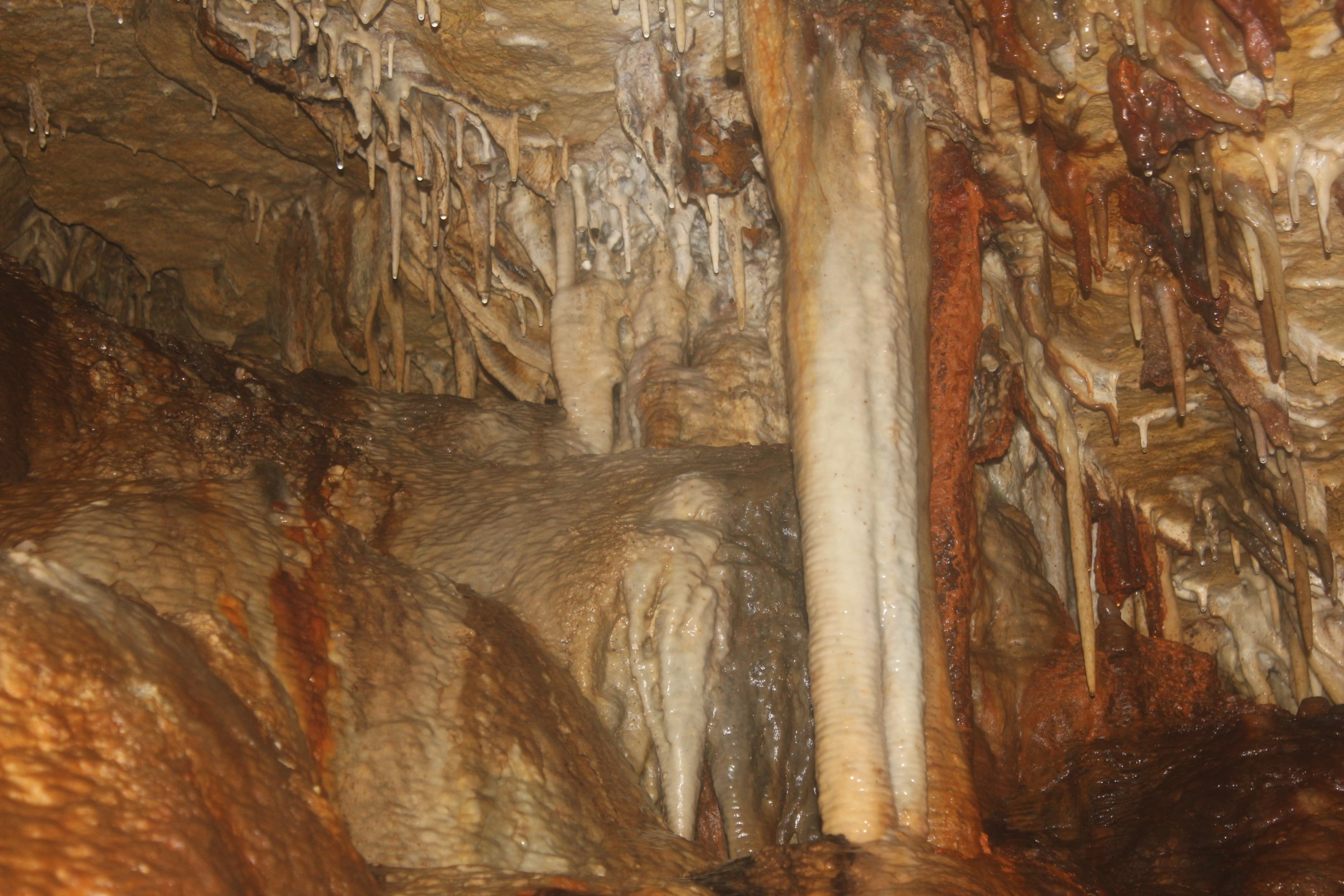
Several Stalactites hanging from the ceiling and a large column

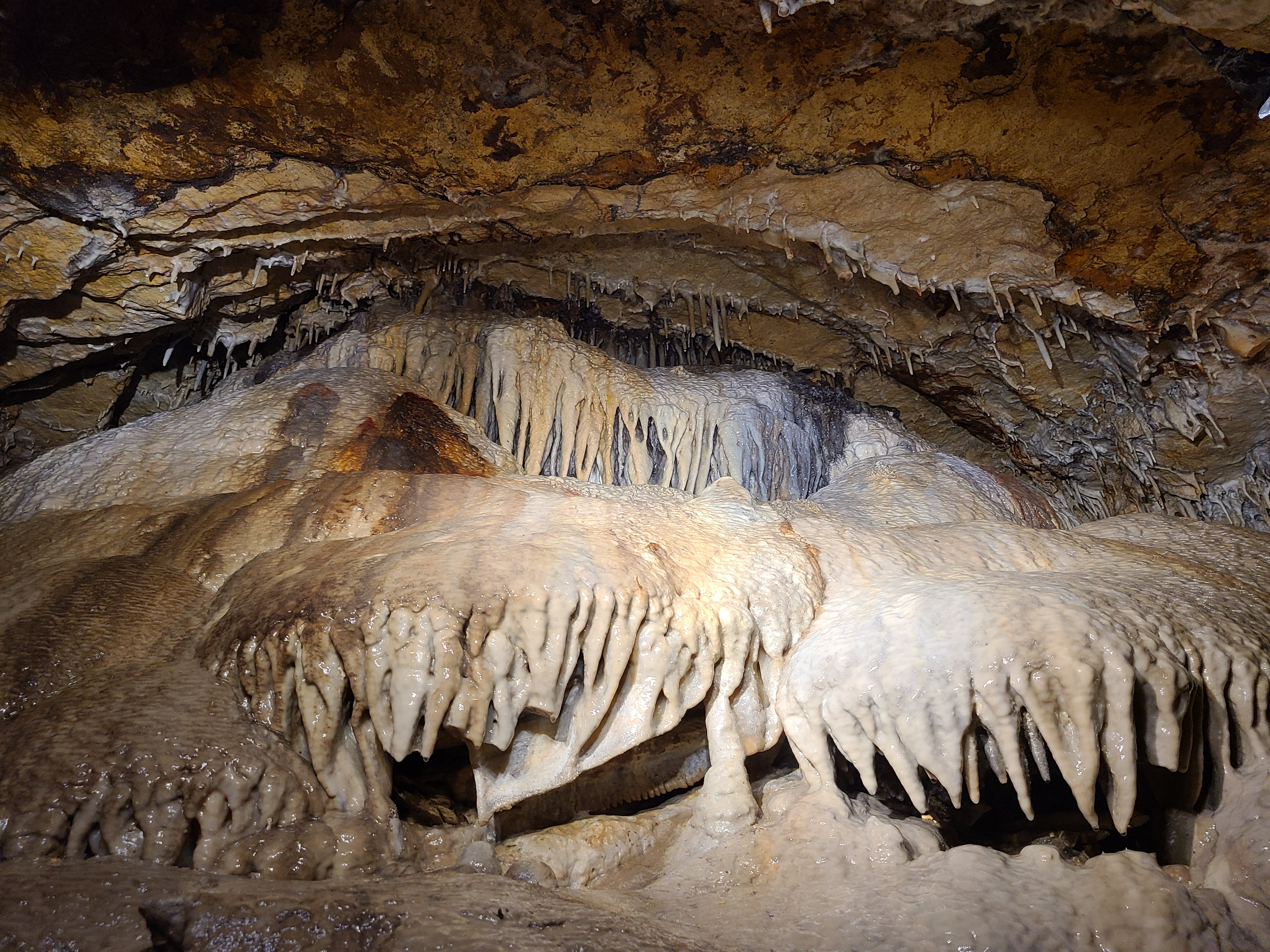
Stalactites within Cave of the Mounds

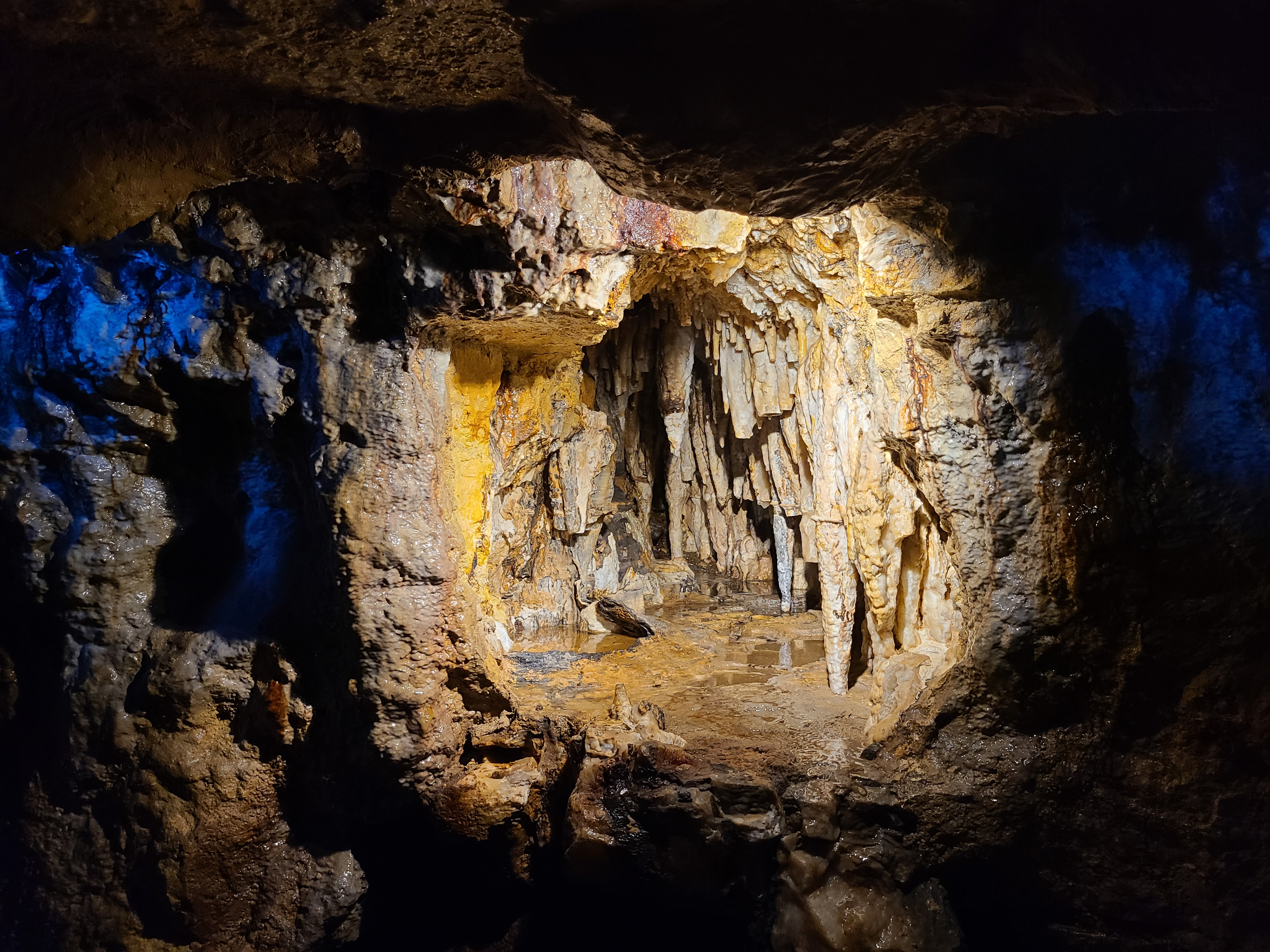
Recess within Cave of the Mounds

== Ecosystem ==
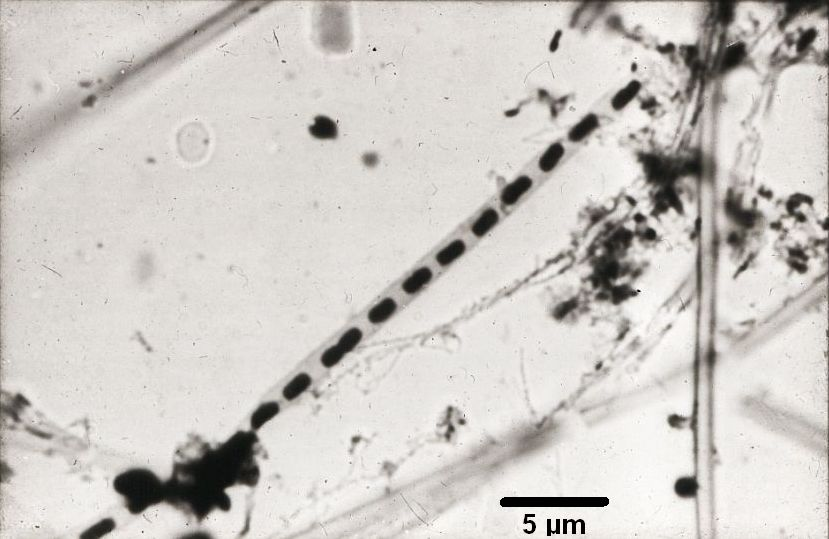
Microscopic view of Leptothrix individuals

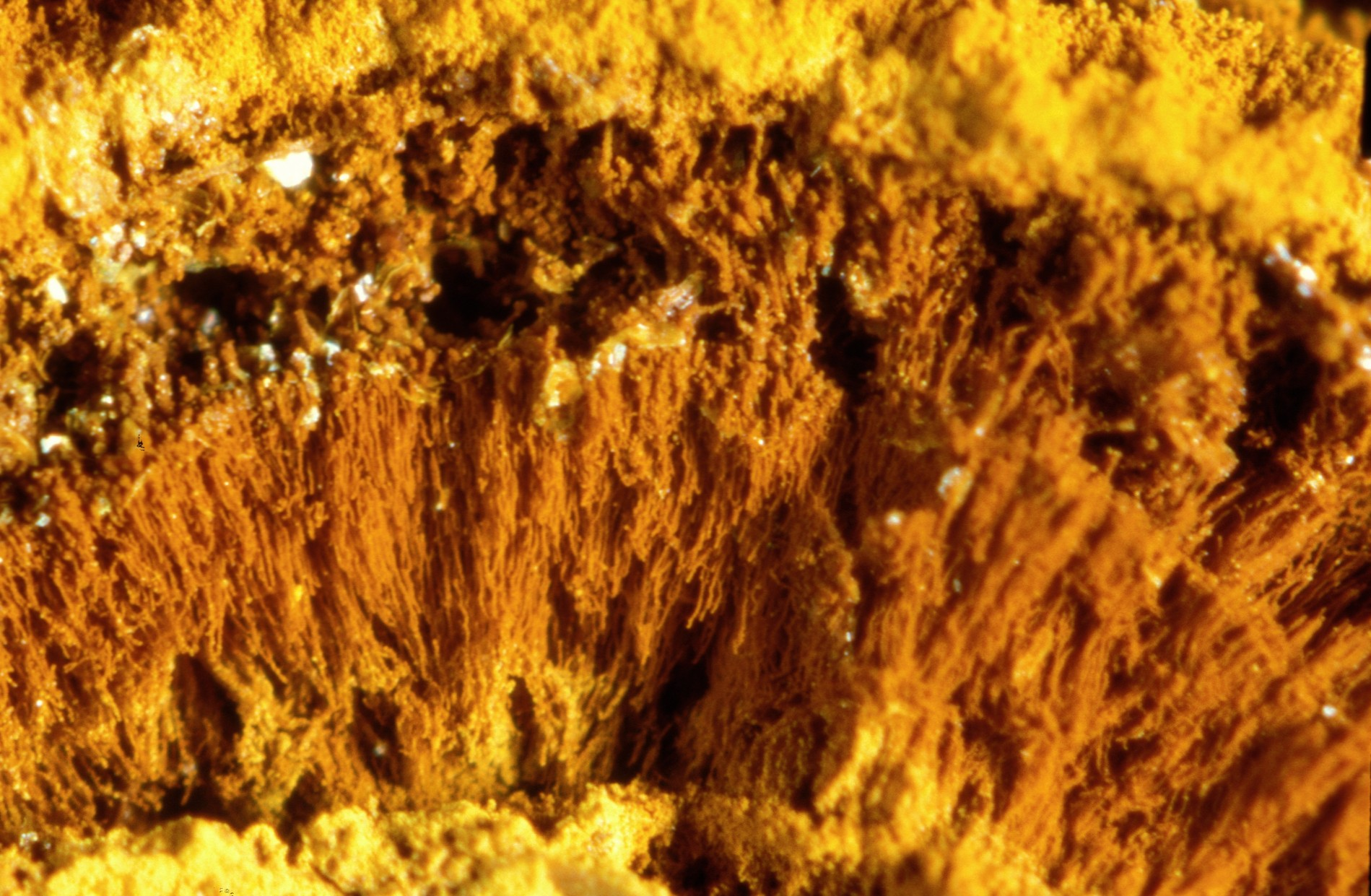
A large growth of Gallionella ferruginea bacteria.

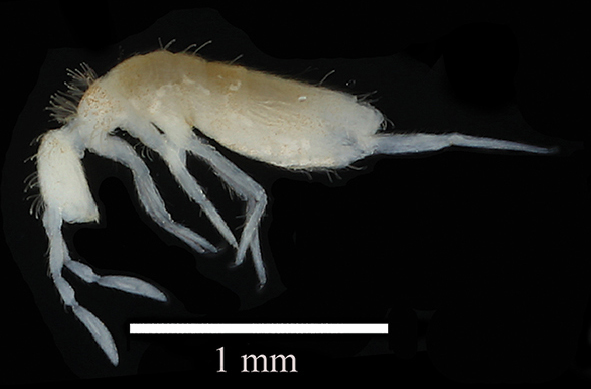
A springtail in the Coecobrya genus, however it is a member of the species Coecobrya phanthuratensis, and not C. tenebricosa.

Because the cave was underground before humans discovered it, animals like bats are not usually found in this subterranean environment. Despite this, a number of organisms that were small enough to seep through cracks in the ceiling populate the cave.

- Bacteria in the genus Leptothrix have been found in the cave. These Gram-negative bacteria oxidize manganese when processing organic matter. This process creates the black and grey streaks found on some of the cave formations. These single-celled organisms primarily inhabit aquatic environments, and have been known to clog pipes.
- Another bacteria found in the cave is the species Gallionella ferruginea. These organisms are chemolithotrophic bacteria (meaning they use in-organic substances as a source of nutrients). These bacteria oxidize the iron in the cave, giving some of the formations a rusty red color.
- The most complex organism in the cave is the springtail species Coecobrya tenebricosa. These small, white colored hexapodan arthropods are only around a millimeter in length. They get their common name due to a furcula on their abdomen that allows them to launch themselves into the air. Although this species is commonly found throughout the world in soil and leaf litter, this specific population has been completely isolated in the cave. They are commonly found in damp areas, most commonly on the surface of pools of water in the cave where they feed on the various bacteria species.

== Tourism ==
The cave is located 20 miles west of Madison, off U.S. Highways 18/151 in Blue Mounds, Wisconsin. Since its opening in 1940, the cave has hosted millions of tourists.
