= Brigham County Park =

Park in Dane County, Wisconsin, USA

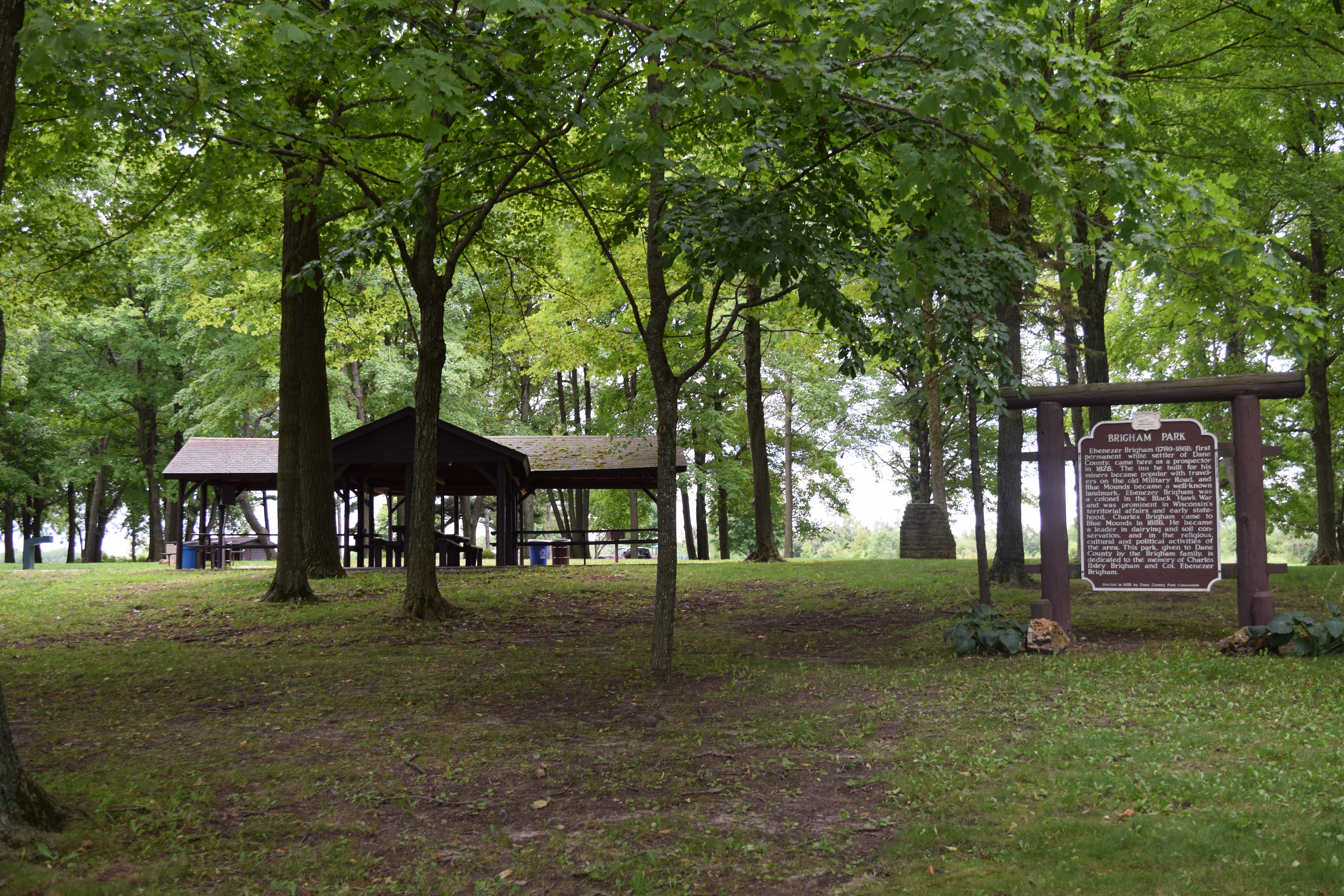
- Interactive map of Brigham County Park
- Location: 3160 County Highway F, Blue Mounds, Wisconsin
- Coordinates: 43.0280520°N 89.8176231°W
- Area: 232 acres (0.94 km^{2})
- Operator: Dane County Parks

Brigham County Park is a county park located in western Dane County, Wisconsin near the village of Blue Mounds. The park encompasses 232 acres (0.94 km^{2}) and includes 25 campsites. Other amenities in the park include nature and snowshoe trails, a picnic area, a playground, and volleyball and horseshoe courts. A 1.5-mile (2.4 km) bicycle trail connects the campground to the Military Ridge State Trail.

The park was named for Ebenezer Brigham, the first permanent European resident of Dane County. Brigham served as a colonel in the Black Hawk War and played a prominent role in Wisconsin's territorial politics. He and his family owned a large amount of land in the area, and the park was formed when the family donated its land to the county. A state historical marker in the park commemorates Brigham and his family's role in forming the park. Nearby Blue Mound State Park was also formed from Brigham's land.

The park is the site of East Blue Mound, the highest point in Dane County at 1,489 feet (454 m). The mound is the partner of the taller Blue Mound, which is the highest point in southern Wisconsin, and one of the two mounds that gives the village of Blue Mounds its name.
