= Hillestad =

Hillestad may refer to:

== Places ==
- Hillestad, Agder, a village in the municipality of Åmli in Agder county, Norway
- Hillestad Church, an old name for Tovdal Church in Åmli municipality in Agder county, Norway
- Hillestad, Vestfold, a village in the municipality of Holmestrand in Vestfold county, Norway
- Hillestad Church, a church in the municipality of Holmestrand in Vestfold county, Norway
- Hillestad, Buskerud, a village in the municipality of Kongsberg in Buskerud county, Norway

== People ==
- Albert W. Hillestad (1924-2007), an Episcopal priest and bishop of the Episcopal Diocese of Springfield
- Dori Hillestad Butler (born 1965), an American author of children's books
- Edmund Hillestad (1861-1946), an American businessman and member of the South Dakota House of Representatives
- Erik Hillestad (born 1951), a Norwegian record producer and lyricist
- Gro Hillestad Thune (born 1943), a Norwegian jurist and politician for the Labour Party
- Margaret E. Hillestad (born 1961), a Norwegian politician for the Centre Party
- Per Hillestad (born 1959), a Norwegian musician (drums) and record producer

== See also ==
- Hyllestad
- Hylestad
