= Shelley Ryan =

American gardener and television host

- Born: August 6, 1956; Carbondale, Illinois, U.S.
- Died: January 16, 2014 (aged 57); Mount Horeb, Wisconsin, U.S.
- Education: University of Wisconsin–Madison (B.A.)
- Occupations: Television personality, gardening instructor, author, TV producer
- Years active: 1976–2014
- Spouse: Dennie
- Children: 1 son

Shelley Ryan (August 6, 1956 – January 16, 2014) was an American gardener and cook best known as the host of the television show The Wisconsin Gardener which aired on Wisconsin Public Television and other PBS Stations.

== Background ==
Ryan was born in 1956 in Carbondale, Illinois, to Neil and Jane Ford. She moved to Middleton, Wisconsin as a young girl, graduated from Middleton High School, and then attended and graduated from UW-Madison.

Ryan worked at Wisconsin Public Radio for a number of years before finding her true love in plants in the gardening world. She became a Master Gardener through UW Extension and worked at a number of different nurseries in the area before her idea of a television show for Public TV that would cover the wants, needs and questions of the state of Wisconsin.

== The Wisconsin Gardener ==
The Wisconsin Gardener is a half-hour show that Ryan produced and hosted on Wisconsin Public Television. On the air since 1992, the program was one of the longest running gardening programs on North American television, with hundreds of episodes filmed. Ryan hosted and produced the program for 21 years. The show led to creation of Wisconsin Public Television's Garden Expo, which draws 20,000 gardening enthusiasts to Madison every February. Over the years, Ryan was also the voice of promotional spots for both Wisconsin Public Television and Wisconsin Public Radio.

== Books and publications ==
Ryan published a cookbook, Leeks, Love And Laughter: Growing And Eating Through the Seasons in 2005 through HenschelHAUS Publishing. She wrote columns and articles for Wisconsin Gardening Magazine, Country Market, Midwest Living magazine, Country Woman magazine, Fine Gardening magazine, and local and regional publications.

== Personal life and death ==
Ryan lived in Blue Mounds, Wisconsin with her husband. Ryan was diagnosed with breast cancer in 2008. Ryan retired from her role as host of The Wisconsin Gardener in April 2013 after completing work on the show's final season. At the time, she shared news with her fans that her breast cancer had returned.
