= Ebenezer Brigham =

Wisconsin pioneer and politician

- Born: April 28, 1789; Shrewsbury, Massachusetts, United States
- Died: September 14, 1861 (aged 72); Madison, Wisconsin
- Occupations: Businessman, militia officer and politician
- Known for: Early Wisconsin pioneer and miner; first American permanent settler to live in present-day Dane County, Wisconsin.
- Relatives: David Brigham, brother Prescott Brigham, brother Jerome R. Brigham, nephew

Ebenezer Brigham (April 28, 1789 – September 14, 1861) was a 19th-century American pioneer, businessman, and politician. He was one of the first Americans to explore southwestern Wisconsin and the first permanent settler in present-day Dane County, Wisconsin. A militia officer during the Black Hawk War, he served as commander of Fort Blue Mounds (or Mound Fort) and was active in both the Wisconsin territorial council, and the Wisconsin State Assembly during the 1840s and 1850s.

== Early life ==
Born in Shrewsbury, Massachusetts, he left his home state for Illinois Territory, traveling by canoe along the Allegheny River from Olean Point to Pittsburgh, then taking a flatboat down the Ohio River until stopping at Shawneetown. He walked the rest of the way, arriving in St. Louis in 1818.

== Career ==
Working as a prospector, Brigham followed the Mississippi River by horseback and stayed at Galena in 1822. One of the earliest visitors to the area, he helped miner James Johnson build one of two log cabins at the camp. Returning to Springfield, Illinois, he left there with a team of oxen heading for the lead mines region of southwest Wisconsin to build his own mining camp.

He was originally part of a mining party which lived along the Platte River, only four miles from present-day Platteville, Wisconsin. However, the party soon left the area under threat from the local Winnebagos during the Winnebago War.

In the spring of 1828, Brigham arrived in Dane County, Wisconsin to work the lead mines in and around Blue Mounds. Although the mines had been previously occupied, the site had long since been abandoned and he built a cabin for himself. This was the first structure to be built in Dane County. His nearest neighbor was located 24 miles away in Dodgeville and, as of 1832, the only other recorded inhabitants were four French-Canadian fur traders south of Green Bay and east of Rock River. Using such crude tools as a windlass, rope and tub, over 4,000,000 lbs. was taken from the mine and hauled by wagon to Green Bay, Chicago and Galena, in total a 15-day trip. He later accompanied William S. Hamilton and Henry Gratiot and several others to Green Bay to negotiate boundaries between the miners and local tribes.

Brigham is said to have discovered a lead deposit by chance, by throwing his cap in the air and digging where it fell. By 1828, he had established a successful lead mine operation at Blue Mounds, as well as operating an inn and general store serving the local miners, local tribes and other travelers. His tavern became a popular stopover along the Old Military Trail, and soon his small mining camp grew with settlers arriving from Illinois and within the Michigan Territory. He was honored by the Michigan territorial governor Lewis Cass and appointed a magistrate. He held the position of magistrate for four years, serving as justice of the peace, and from the winter of 1830–1831 until 1837, as postmaster of Moundville.

During the Black Hawk War, he served as a colonel in the Wisconsin Territorial Militia. Fort Blue Mounds was later built near Brigham's home, and he and his neighbors took refuge there during the conflict. While Brigham remained in command, he successfully defended the post against several raids by the Sauk and Meskwaki. Involved in politics during his later years, Brigham was a member of the territorial council between 1836 and 1842 and a state representative in 1848, and he served on the Dane County board of commissioners in 1845, 1848–1850, and 1854–1855.

== Death ==
He died at the home of his niece, a Mrs. H.G. Bliss, in Madison, Wisconsin on September 14, 1861, and was buried in Forest Hill Cemetery. Although the original cabins at the site had long since disappeared, the general store remained at Blue Mounds for over forty years as an historic landmark until it was destroyed in a fire in January 1877. His part is now part of Blue Mound and Brigham County Park, the latter being named in his honor.

== Legacy ==
In March 1910, his heirs donated the site of an old blockhouse from Fort Blue Mounds to the State Historical Society of Wisconsin having been used during the Black Hawk War. A bronze tablet marking the site of the fort was unveiled by the Wisconsin Landmarks Committee in a special ceremony held on September 5, 1910. A replica of his general store is also on display at the Mt. Horeb Historical Society Museum in Mt. Horeb, Wisconsin.
