= Hyllestad =

Hyllestad may refer to:

== Places ==
- Hyllestad Municipality, a municipality in Vestland county, Norway
- Hyllestad (village), a village within Hyllestad Municipality in Vestland county, Norway
- Hyllestad Church, a church in Hyllestad Municipality in Vestland county, Norway
- Hyllestad quernstone quarries, historical quarries and UNESCO World Heritage Site in Hyllestad Municipality in Vestland county, Norway

== See also ==
- Hylestad Municipality
- Hillestad (disambiguation)
- Hyllested
