= Mount Horeb, Wisconsin =

- Village
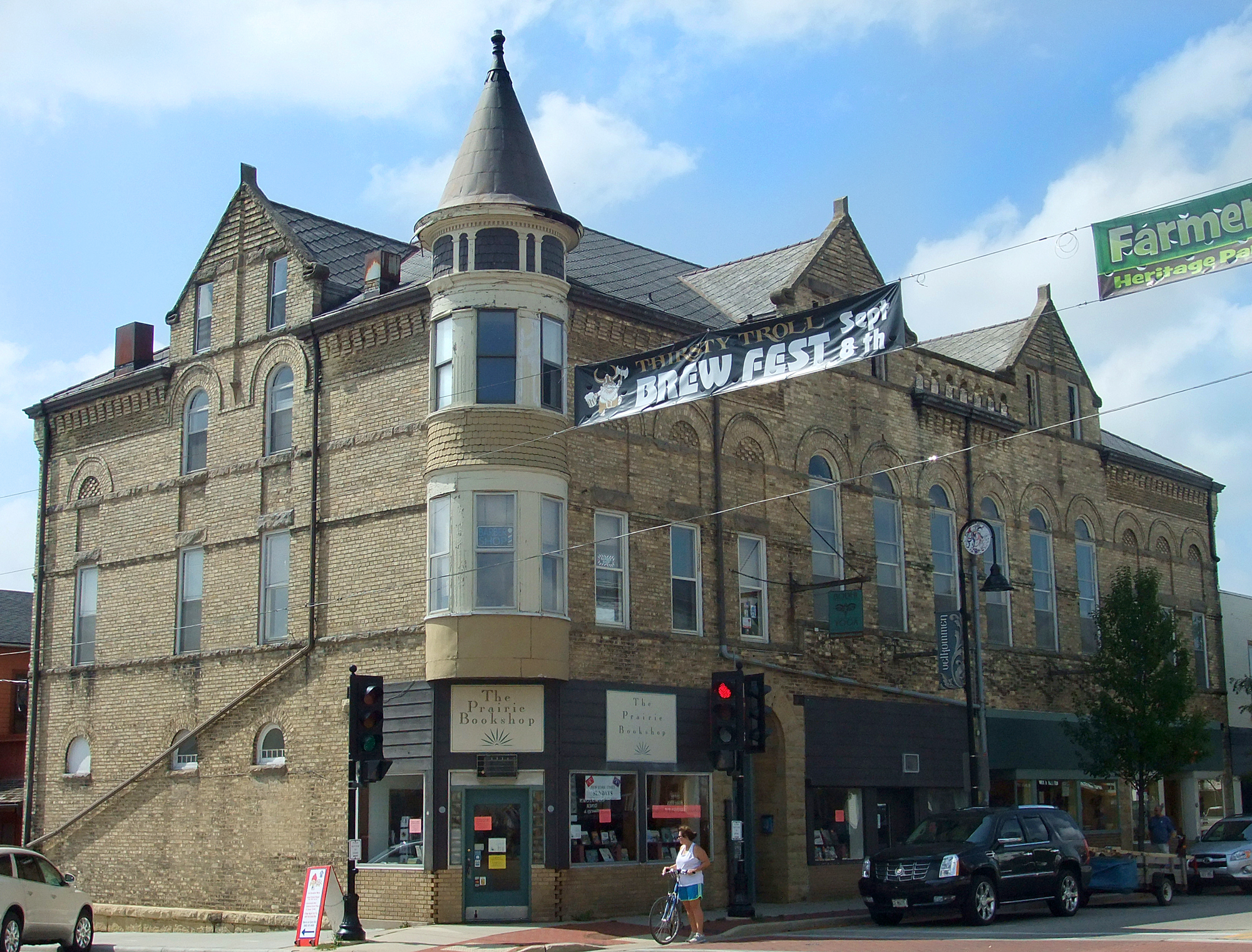
- Mt. Horeb Opera Block on Main Street
- Interactive map of Mount Horeb, Wisconsin
- Location within Wisconsin Location within the United States
- Coordinates: 43°0′23″N 89°44′3″W
- Country: United States
- State: Wisconsin
- County: Dane

Government
  - Village President: Ryan Czyzewski

Area
  - Total: 3.22 sq mi (8.35 km^{2})
  - Land: 3.22 sq mi (8.35 km^{2})
  - Water: 0 sq mi (0.00 km^{2})
- Elevation: 1,243 ft (379 m)

Population (2020)
  - Total: 7,754
  - Density: 2,335.8/sq mi (901.86/km^{2})
- Time zone: UTC-6 (Central (CST))
  - Summer (DST): UTC-5 (CDT)
- Area code: 608
- FIPS code: 55-54725
- GNIS feature ID: 1569817
- Website: mounthorebwi.info

Mount Horeb is a village in Dane County, Wisconsin, United States. The population was 7,754 at the 2020 census. It is part of the Madison metropolitan area.

== History ==
Mount Horeb is part of the ancestral territory of the Ho-Chunk nation. Beginning in 1829, the Ho-Chunk experienced pressure from European and American settlers as their land was opened for agriculture and lead mining. An 1829 treaty ceded the territory that would be the future site of Mount Horeb to the United States.

In 1849, the tract of land that would become Mount Horeb was purchased by James Morrison, and a year later sold a portion to Granville Neal. This initial settlement largely drew individuals of English, Irish, German, and Scottish ethnic backgrounds, as well as Yankees and settlers from Southern states. In 1861, the first post office in Mount Horeb was established in the home of English immigrant and Methodist Episcopal lay minister George Wright. As the new postmaster, Wright selected the name Mount Horeb from the Biblical Mount Horeb, wherein the prophet Moses received the Ten Commandments. When Wright moved to Norwalk, Iowa, the post office moved to a space closer to the settlement referred to as "The Corners." The name changed to "Horeb's Corner" before officially being designated as Mount Horeb.

The presence of Norwegian immigrants played a significant role in the village's growth. Norwegian immigration historian Odd S. Lovoll observes that by the 1870s, Norwegian immigrants had created significant settlements throughout Wisconsin, particularly in Dane County. In 1871, Andrew Levordson became the first Norwegian immigrant to arrive in Mount Horeb, marking the beginning of this ethnic-group's presence in the village.

In 1856, Osten Olson Haugen and his family, who emigrated from Tinn Municipality, Norway, established a forty-acre farmstead between Mount Horeb and Blue Mounds, Wisconsin. In 1926, Isak J. Dahle of Mount Horeb purchased the site and renamed the farmstead "Nissedahle". Over the years, Dahle converted the site into the Little Norway, Wisconsin living history museum, creating an idealized folk version of Norway. The site was opened to the public in 1934. Little Norway became a major attraction in the area, and guests were invited to participate in educational activities as they explored the open-air museum. Little Norway closed in 2012, and visitors to the Driftless Historium in Mount Horeb can take virtual tours of the stave church.

== Geography ==
Located in southwestern Wisconsin, Mount Horeb is situated in the Driftless Area, an unglaciated region of rolling hills. The village is located in southwestern Dane County approximately 20 miles (32 km) southwest of the state capital, Madison. It is along U.S. Highway 151 and encompasses a total area of 3.25 square miles. Mount Horeb is also located near Blue Mound State Park.

== Demographics ==
Historical population
Census	Pop.	Note	%±
1880	42		—
1900	864		—
1910	1,048		21.3%
1920	1,350		28.8%
1930	1,425		5.6%
1940	1,610		13.0%
1950	1,716		6.6%
1960	1,991		16.0%
1970	2,402		20.6%
1980	3,251		35.3%
1990	4,182		28.6%
2000	5,860		40.1%
2010	7,009		19.6%
2020	7,754		10.6%
U.S. Decennial Census

=== 2010 census ===
As of the census of 2010, there were 7,011 people, 2,696 households, and 1,878 families residing in the village. The population density was 2,156.6 inhabitants per square mile (832.7/km^{2}). There were 2,826 housing units at an average density of 869.5 per square mile (335.7/km^{2}). The racial makeup of the village was 96.0% White, 0.8% African American, 0.2% Native American, 0.6% Asian, 0.5% from other races, and 1.8% from two or more races. Hispanic or Latino of any race were 1.7% of the population.

There were 2,696 households, of which 41.6% had children under the age of 18 living with them, 56.5% were married couples living together, 9.5% had a female householder with no husband present, 3.7% had a male householder with no wife present, and 30.3% were non-families. 24.4% of all households were made up of individuals, and 10.2% had someone living alone who was 65 years of age or older. The average household size was 2.56 and the average family size was 3.09.

The median age in the village was 35.5 years. 29.5% of residents were under the age of 18; 5.8% were between the ages of 18 and 24; 29.1% were from 25 to 44; 24.1% were from 45 to 64; and 11.4% were 65 years of age or older. The gender makeup of the village was 47.9% male and 52.1% female.

=== 2000 census ===
As of the census of 2000, there were 5,860 people, 2,228 households, and 1,544 families residing in the village. As of 2010 there are 7,009 people. The population density (in 2000) was 2,011.5 people per square mile (777.5/km^{2}). There were 2,305 housing units at an average density of 791.2 per square mile (305.8/km^{2}). The racial makeup of the village was 98.28% White, 0.22% African American, 0.24% Native American, 0.31% Asian, 0.09% Pacific Islander, 0.34% from other races, and 0.53% from two or more races. Hispanic or Latino of any race were 0.58% of the population. 33.0% were of German, 22.6% Norwegian, 10.7% Irish, 5.8% English and 5.2% American ancestry according to Census 2000.

There were 2,228 households, out of which 38.8% had children under the age of 18 living with them, 57.1% were married couples living together, 9.5% had a female householder with no husband present, and 30.7% were non-families. 24.3% of all households were made up of individuals, and 10.5% had someone living alone who was 65 years of age or older. The average household size was 2.56 and the average family size was 3.07.

In the village, the population was spread out, with 28.8% under the age of 18, 6.8% from 18 to 24, 34.0% from 25 to 44, 17.4% from 45 to 64, and 13.0% who were 65 years of age or older. The median age was 34 years. For every 100 females, there were 91.3 males. For every 100 females age 18 and over, there were 86.8 males.

The median income for a household in the village was $55,513, and the median income for a family was $63,234. Males had a median income of $40,850 versus $27,391 for females. The per capita income for the village was $23,359. About 0.8% of families and 3.1% of the population were below the poverty line, including 2.0% of those under age 18 and 9.0% of those age 65 or over.

== Economy ==
Duluth Trading Company announced it would be moving its corporate headquarters from Belleville, Wisconsin, to Mount Horeb in 2017.

Mount Horeb is home to the Gonstead Clinic of Chiropractic, founded in 1939 by Clarence Gonstead. Gonstead developed the widely-used Gonstead chiropractic technique for spinal adjustment. With the completion in 1964 of a 19,000-square-foot (1,800 m^{2}) building on Route 151, and the adjoining Karakahl Inn, it became a nationally (in chiropractic circles) recognized chiropractic center. It gradually declined in importance after the 1978 death of its founder, and in the 2000s the buildings were the target of a preservation effort.

== Arts and culture ==
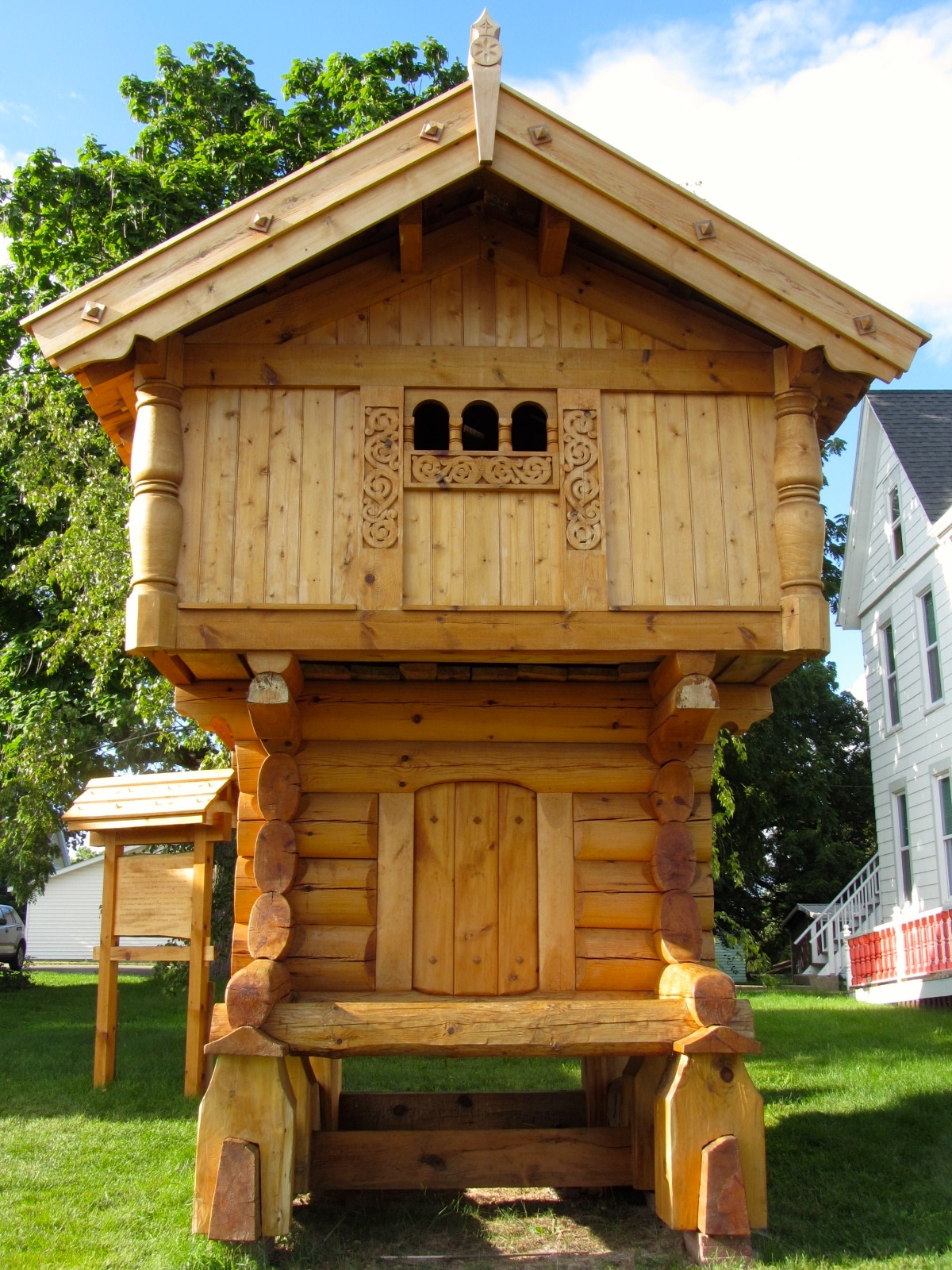
A stabbur in Mount Horeb

Mount Horeb has been known by some residents as the "Mustard Capital of the World" as well as the "Troll Capital of the World". The Chamber of Commerce calls the main street the "Trollway," and troll statues and themes decorate many area businesses. This reflects Mount Horeb's largely Norwegian heritage.

Mount Horeb was formerly home to the Mount Horeb Mustard Museum. In 2009, the Mustard Museum relocated to Middleton, Wisconsin, where it is now known as the National Mustard Museum. The museum exhibited a large collection of unusual mustards and antique mustard jars. It was featured on Unwrapped, National Public Radio's Morning Edition and Weekend Edition Saturday

=== Trolls ===
During the 1980s, as part of an effort to continue celebrating their Norwegian and Norwegian-American heritage, as well as a reaction to the construction of the Business Highway 18/151 bypass, Mount Horeb transformed itself into the "Troll Capital of the World." In Norwegian folklore, trolls are said to be about the size of, if not smaller than, humans. They have ugly faces, stout bodies, and tails. These trolls featured in Mount Horeb hearken to this tradition, and residents have incorporated these playful, often numbskull, characters throughout the village. The majority of them, whether painted, sculpted, or carved from logs with a chainsaw, are located along Main Street, "The Trollway." Each of the 40 trolls in Mount Horeb has its own distinct identity, such as "The Chicken Thief," "The Accordion Player," and "Sweet Swill."

The "Trollway" originated from the Chamber of Commerce's attempts to draw traffic away from the bypass and back into the center of town to promote local businesses.

=== Song of Norway ===
After returning from a trip abroad to Scandinavia, Mount Horeb resident and artist, Oljanna Cunneen, suggested that hosting a festival centered on a performance of ethnic identity may be a "fun" endeavor for the community to engage in. In 1966, Mount Horeb premiered "Song of Norway" (1944), an operetta by Robert Wright (writer) and George Forrest (author) (1944). "Song of Norway" tells the fictionalized account of Norwegian composer Edvard Grieg. The first performance was held at the Tyrol Ski Basin. In 1979, the play moved to the Cave of the Mounds, where a permanent stage was constructed. The play featured local and professional actors who performed on an outdoor stage. The Norwegian folk costumes, such as the bunad, were made by local artists dedicated to the success of this play and its performance of the community's Norwegian heritage. The play ran annually each summer until the early 2000s, when it eventually ceased annual production.

== Parks and recreation ==
Mount Horeb offers several access points to the Military Ridge State Trail, a 39-mile (63 km) bicycle trail built on a former railroad right-of-way.

== Education ==
The village is served by the public Mount Horeb Area School District, which includes two elementary schools, one intermediate school, one middle school, and Mount Horeb High School.

== Notable people ==
- Matthew Anderson, member of the Wisconsin Legislature
- Alex Bledsoe, author
- Herman Dahle, member of the U.S. House of Representatives from Wisconsin
- William Dyke, lawyer, judge, and politician
- Clarence Gonstead, chiropractor
- Carl M. Grimstad, member of the Wisconsin State Assembly
- Edmund Hillestad, member of the South Dakota House of Representatives
- Michael Johnson, member of the Wisconsin State Assembly
- William C. Kahl, 21st Wisconsin Superintendent of Public Instruction
- Shelly Kittleson, investigative journalist
- Max Meylor, indoor football league player
- Roberta E. Sebenthall, novelist and poet
- Rick Skindrud, member of the Wisconsin State Assembly
