= Paul Kruger (disambiguation) =

Paul Kruger (1825–1904) was state president of the South African Republic.

Paul Kruger or Krüger may also refer to:

- Paul Krüger (jurist) (1840–1926), German jurist
- Paul Krüger (chess player) (1871–1939), German chess master
- Paul Kruger (American football) (born 1986), American football linebacker
- Paul Krüger (politician) (born 1950), German politician
- Roberta E. Sebenthall (1917–1979), American author, who wrote detective novels under the pseudonym "Paul Kruger"
