= Mt. Horeb Opera Block =

- U.S. National Register of Historic Places
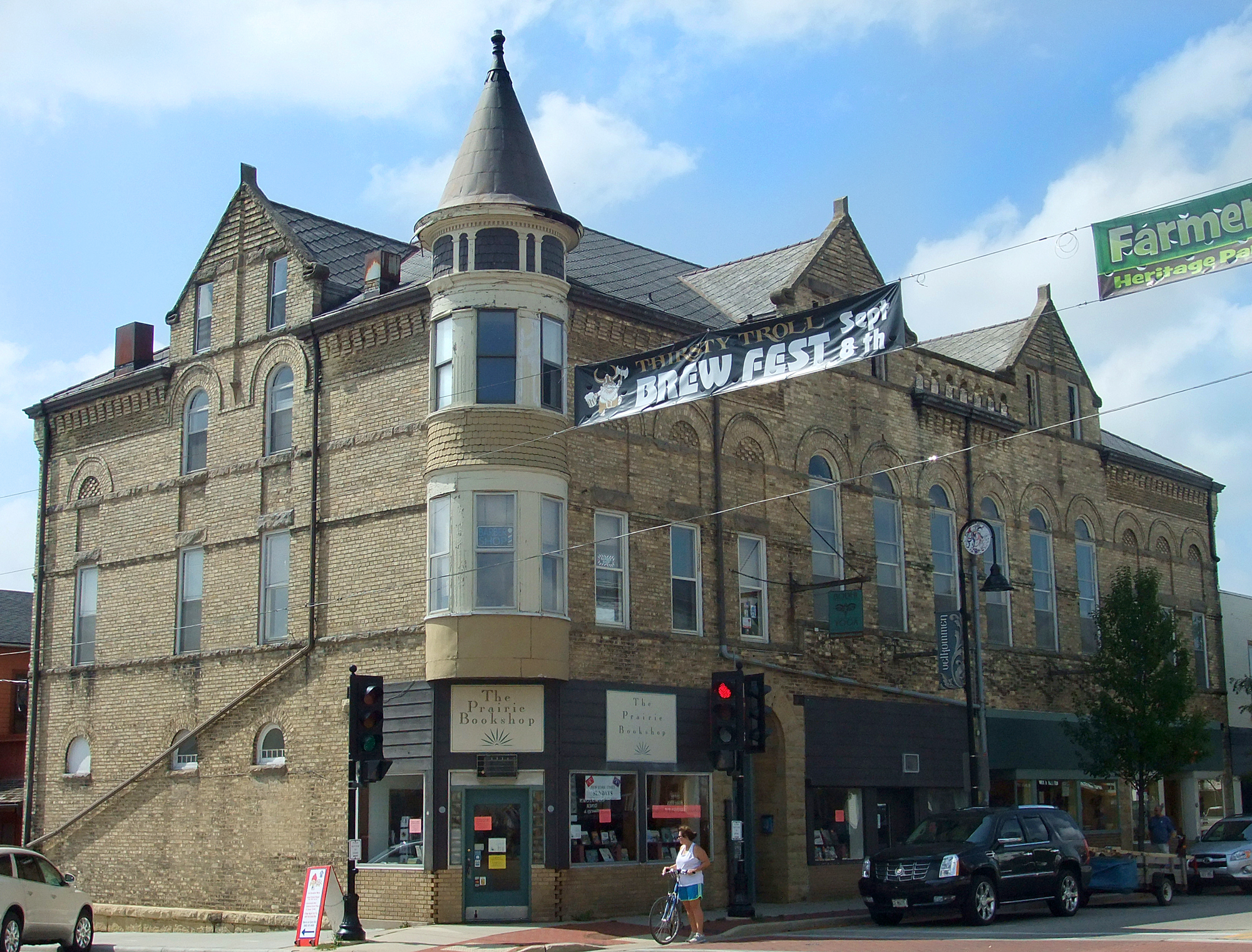
- Mt. Horeb Opera Block
- Location: 109-117 E. Main St. Mount Horeb, Wisconsin
- Built: 1895
- Architect: Gordon and Paunack
- Architectural style: Queen Anne/Romanesque
- NRHP reference No.: 89000068
- Added to NRHP: February 23, 1989

The Mt. Horeb Opera Block is a massive 3-story Queen Anne-styled public venue built in 1895 in Mount Horeb, Wisconsin. It was added to the National Register of Historic Places in 1989.

== History ==
In 1881 Mt. Horeb began to coalesce at its current location by the railroad, becoming a center for collecting and processing milk from the surrounding country. Social life began to organize around halls connected to businesses. Andrew Thompson built a hall with stage which was connected to his furniture store. Halvor Nelson had a lodge hall above his saloon.

In 1894 the Mt. Horeb Opera Block Company was incorporated, with capital stock of $12,000. Stockholders included T.G. Lingard, William Sommer, A.F. Gramm, William Curtiss, H. Witte, H. Nelson and J.E. Kittleson. The company bought the lot at Main and Second Streets and hired architects J.C. Gordon and Fred W. Paunack of Madison to design the building. Ayen and Holum won the contract for excavation and building the cellar. Oakey and Morgan probably did the brickwork and structural carpentry. Anton Bakken did the interior carpentry. O. Lund painted the building. M. Moe decorated the interior. Excavation work had begun by April 4; the building hosted its first plays around November.

The building is three-stories, standing above the mostly two-story buildings around it. Queen Anne style is evident in the corner tower, the dormers that break up the roofline, and the varied textures of the brickwork. Romanesque Revival shows in the round arches. The building originally had commercial space at street level, divided into four stores with plate glass show windows in cast iron frames. Most of the space above was the two-story opera hall, with a stage on the west wall and a two-story dressing room in the northwest corner. A U-shaped balcony circled the stage. Two offices occupied the east end.

The first plays staged in 1895 included Strangers of a Great City, Dixie Land, Sweet Genevieve and Great New York, with some of these shows filling the house. The building has hosted theatrical troupes, dances and political rallies. It began showing movies after 1907. Other events that have taken place there include high school graduation ceremonies, basketball games and speeches by the Woman's Christian Temperance Union. In 1917, when the local high school was destroyed in a fire, classes were held at the Mt. Horeb Opera Block while the new high school was being constructed.

The opera house closed in 1922, perhaps due to competition from other venues like the new high school, Luder's recreation building, and Bakken and Peterson's dance hall and theater. T.G. Lingard bought the opera house and remodeled the opera space into three-stories of meeting space for the Freemasons, American Legion, and other lodges.
