= Duluth Trading Company =

American workwear and accessories company

Duluth Holdings Inc.

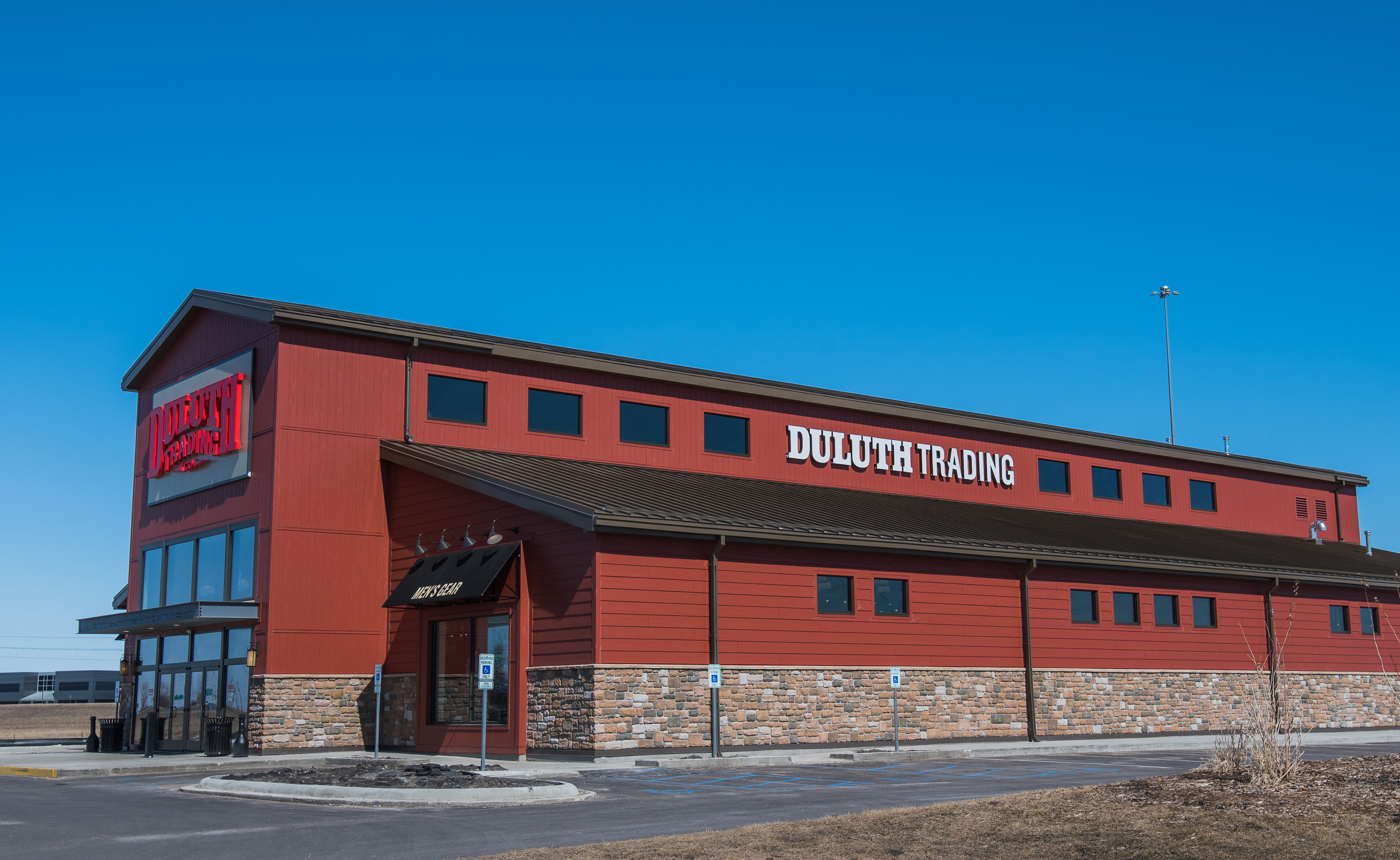
- A Duluth Trading Company store in Fargo, North Dakota
- Trade name: Duluth Trading Co.
- Formerly: Pull'r Holding Company, LLC; Portable Products, Inc.
- Type: Public company
- Traded as: Nasdaq: DLTH
- Industry: Clothing
- Founded: 1989; 37 years ago in Duluth, Minnesota, United States
- Founder: Bob & Dave Fierek
- Headquarters: Mount Horeb, Wisconsin, United States
- Number of locations: 65 (2023)
- Products: Workwear and accessories
- Revenue: ▼US$653.307 million (2023)
- Operating income: ▼US$6.231 million (2023)
- Net income: ▼US$2.304 million (2023)
- Total assets: ▲US$225.897 million (2023)
- Total equity: ▲US$230.407 million (2023)
- Number of employees: c. 1,200 (September 2023)
- Website: www.duluthtrading.com

Duluth Holdings Inc., which primarily sells goods through its Duluth Trading Company brand, is an American workwear and accessories company.

== History ==
=== Founding ===
Originally founded by two brothers, Bob and Dave Fierek, as Portable Products, Inc. in 1989; the company then primarily focused on those working in construction and a tool accessory known as the "Bucket Boss". The business grew to incorporate more tool accessories and storage equipment in a catalog, under the Portable Products banner, with the first headquarters being established on a barge in Duluth, Minnesota soon after. By 1993, the catalog was expanded and entitled Duluth Trading Co.

=== Expansion ===
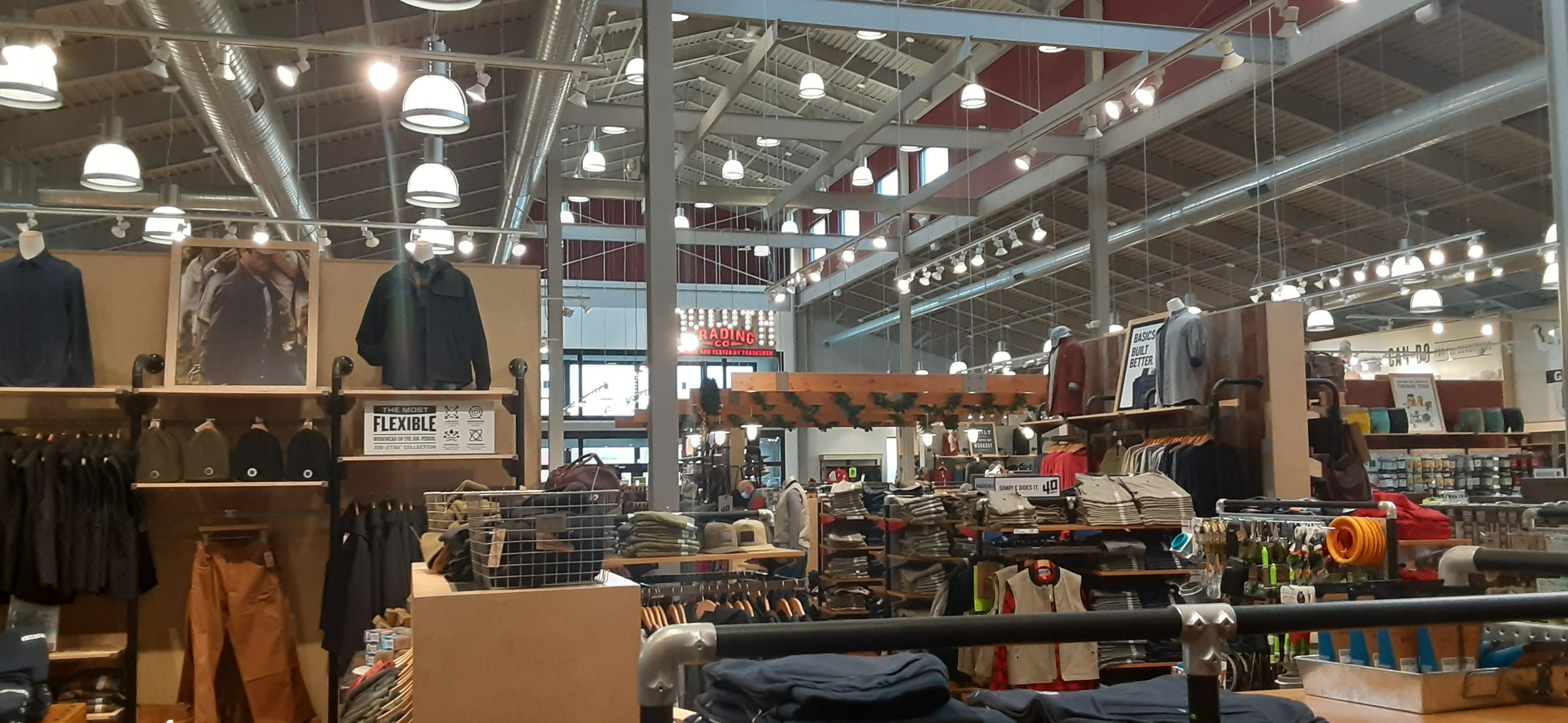
Interior of a Duluth Trading Company store in Wixom, Michigan

In the mid-1990s, the company switched hands, purchased by Fiskars. In 2000 it was sold again, this time to Gempler's, and moved its headquarters to Belleville, Wisconsin. The company created a successful line of shirts called "Longtail T Shirts" in 2002 which were designed to get rid of plumber's crack. Gempler's was sold in 2003 to Lab Safety Supply and the owners retained Duluth Trading Company. Two years later in 2005, the first women's catalog was released.

In 2011, Duluth Trading Company aired its first nationwide ads featuring an angry beaver. Duluth Trading Company's parent, Duluth Holdings, went public in 2015.

During the retail apocalypse of the mid-2010s when many physical stores were closing, Duluth Trading Company had outperformed their own expectations and continued to open new locations throughout the United States. Due to its rapid rate of expansion, Duluth Trading Company saw lower revenues in 2017. There are 31 stores as of December 8, 2017, and there are plans for opening 15 more that year. The company will open its first store in the New York Metropolitan Area at The Ramsey Square Shopping Center in Ramsey, New Jersey.

=== Sponsorship ===
In 2017, Duluth Trading Company was chosen to be the "Official Off-Sled Outfitter" of the United States luge team. In June 2022, the company was named title sponsor of the Cure Bowl, a postseason college football bowl game.
