= Leptothrix mobilis =

Scientific classification
- Domain: Bacteria
- Kingdom: Pseudomonadati
- Phylum: Pseudomonadota
- Class: Betaproteobacteria
- Order: Burkholderiales
- Genus: Leptothrix
- Species: L. mobilis

Binomial name
- Leptothrix mobilis Spring et al. 1997

Type strain
- LMG 17066, DSM 10617

Species of bacterium

Leptothrix mobilis is a bacterium from the genus Leptothrix which was isolated from freshwater sediments.
