= Leptothrix ochracea =

Scientific classification
- Domain: Bacteria
- Kingdom: Pseudomonadati
- Phylum: Pseudomonadota
- Class: Betaproteobacteria
- Order: Burkholderiales
- Family: Sphaerotilaceae
- Genus: Leptothrix
- Species: L. ochracea

Binomial name
- Leptothrix ochracea Kützing 1843, species.

Species of bacterium

Leptothrix ochracea is a neutrophilic aerobic rod-shaped, Gram-negative bacterium that can oxidize iron. This bacterium is commonly found in iron-rich freshwater streams, wetlands, ponds, and the rhizosphere. L. ochracea is typically identified by the thick, orange, fluffy mats it forms out of iron biominerals, including ferrihydrite, goethite, and lepidocrocite. It frequently coexists with another iron-oxidizing bacterial species, Gallionella ferruginea, with G. ferruginea dominating iron mats in the spring and L. ochracea making up the majority of iron mats during the rest of the year.

== Morphology and sheath function ==
L. ochracea is a Gram-negative, rod-shaped bacterium that occurs in cell chains in sheaths, among many empty sheaths. The sheaths, believed to prevent iron accumulation in the cells, are made of iron oxyhydroxide minerals. The sheaths are typically thin and 1-2 microns wide with a rough surface. The mineral structures may protect the bacteria from predation and act as a holdfasts or anchor points, allowing the bacteria to attach to a surface. Another consideration is that the excretion of the minerals may allow the bacteria to break up complex organic compounds as a food source.

== Phylogeny and genome statistics ==
The bacterium is not in isolation. Sequence size of the metagenome-assembled genomes ranged from 2.59 to 3.04 Mb. The GC content was found to be about 60%. In the SILVA database, L. ochracea was misidentified as the genus Paucibacter based on 16S rRNA sequencing. It is closely related to other Leptothrix species, including L. cholodnii with 96% homology, as well as the genus Sphaerotilus, based on single-cell genomics.

== Metabolism and genomic potential ==
The possession of canonical iron oxidase genes including cyc2 and mtoA support the idea that it is an iron oxidizer, and Fe(II) is necessary for its energy and growth. The possession of two iron oxidases could enable it to use different phases of iron; in the Gallionellaceae species Sideroxydans lithotrophicus ES-1, mtoA is upregulated in the presence of solid Fe(II) in the form of smectite clay. L. ochracea possesses a multicopper oxidase (MCO) called mofA. While MCOs help other bacteria oxidize iron or manganese, how mofA is used by L. ochracea is unknown. Oxygen respiration genes mean it is an aerobe, using atmospheric oxygen for the oxidation of Fe(II) to Fe(III). The presence of RuBisCO indicates the ability to fix carbon, but it also possesses genes involved with organic carbon use. Sox genes indicate the potential for sulfur oxidation. It also possesses genes for nitrate reduction and ammonia and urea assimilation. Since its genome suggests it can use organic and inorganic electron donors and carbon sources, L. ochracea is likely a mixotrophic iron oxidizer.

== Significance ==
These mats support many other species by providing habitat in its physical structure, allowing nutrient cycling, making L. ochracea a keystone species in its environment. The sheaths have the ability to sorb metals, so they may be useful in contaminant removal systems. Additionally, biominerals are studied to create synthetic materials.
