= Leptothrix lopholea =

Scientific classification
- Domain: Bacteria
- Kingdom: Pseudomonadati
- Phylum: Pseudomonadota
- Class: Betaproteobacteria
- Order: Burkholderiales
- Genus: Leptothrix
- Species: L. lopholea

Binomial name
- Leptothrix lopholea Dorff 1934

Type strain
- LVMW 124

Species of bacterium

Leptothrix lopholea is a bacterium from the genus Leptothrix.
