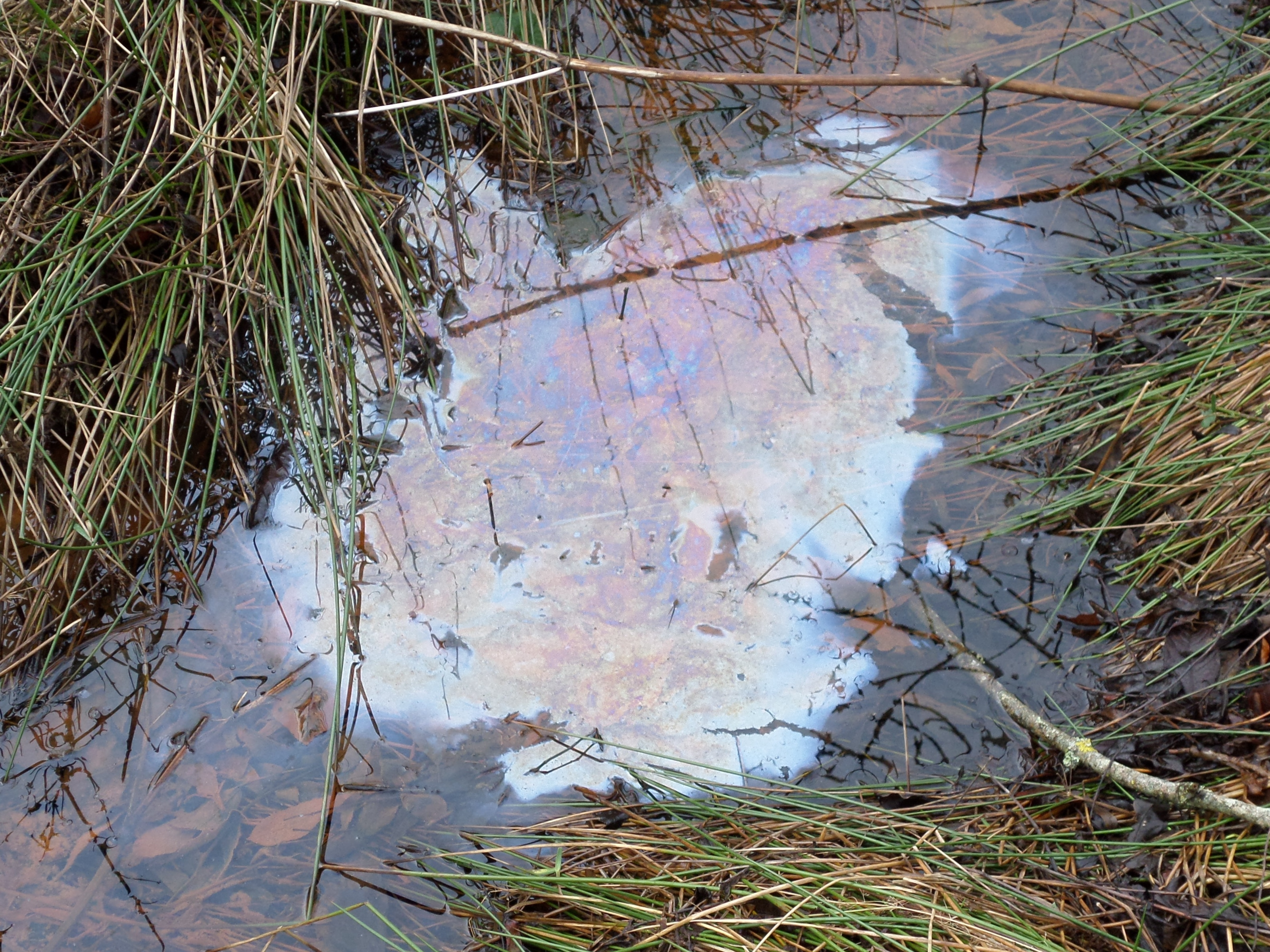
- Leptothrix discophora oil film

Scientific classification
- Domain: Bacteria
- Kingdom: Pseudomonadati
- Phylum: Pseudomonadota
- Class: Betaproteobacteria
- Order: Burkholderiales
- Genus: Leptothrix
- Species: L. discophora

Binomial name
- Leptothrix discophora (ex Schwers 1912) Spring et al. 1997

= Leptothrix discophora =

Species of bacterium

Leptothrix discophora is one of several species of Leptothrix, known for its sheath, and iron-, manganese-, and recently discovered arsenic-removing properties.
