= Hyllested =

Hyllested is a Danish surname. Notable people with the surname include:

- Henning Hyllested (born 1954), Danish politician
- Orla Hyllested (1912–2000), Danish trade unionist

== See also ==
- Hyllestad, Norway
