= Gunnar Johansen =

Danish-born pianist and composer (1906 - 1991)

- Born: January 21, 1906; Copenhagen, Denmark
- Died: May 25, 1991 (aged 85); Blue Mounds, Wisconsin, U.S.
- Occupations: Pianist, composer, academic

Gunnar Johansen (January 21, 1906 – May 25, 1991) was a Danish-born pianist and composer. He was one of the chief proponents of the music of Ferruccio Busoni, whose mature keyboard works he recorded in their entirety, as well as the complete keyboard works of Johann Sebastian Bach. He was also an important early supporter of Harry Partch.

In addition to his work as a concert pianist, Johansen was a scholar, educator and humanist. His many interdisciplinarian efforts included establishment of the Leonardo Academy, dedicated to the integration of the arts, letters, and sciences.

== Biography ==
Born in Copenhagen, Johansen was introduced to the keyboard by his father and made his concert debut at the age of twelve. He went on to study with the pianist and conductor Victor Schiøler. At fourteen he moved to Berlin to further his musical education with Egon Petri, a disciple of Ferruccio Busoni. He also worked with Edwin Fischer and Franz Liszt's pupil Frederic Lamond. He toured as a pianist in Europe in the 1920s and came to the United States in 1929, first settling in California, where he gave live weekly performances on the NBC Radio Network for the next five years.

In the 1930s, he began touring with what he called the Historical Recital Series, a 12-concert cycle which traced the history of keyboard music. These concerts, generally presented as three recitals per week over four weeks, were performed entirely from memory. A performance of the Historical Series at the University of Wisconsin-Madison in April 1939 led to an invitation to become the first artist-in-residence in music at an American university. After taking up the position, Johansen continued to perform demanding, scholarly recitals both locally and nationally; in one notable series, he traced the evolution of Liszt's Hungarian Rhapsodies from the earliest versions to their finished forms.

When he made his New York City debut at Town Hall in 1947, a New York Times critic admired his "ravishingly beautiful tone, unique in its velvetiness and limpidity," and noted that his interpretations "exhibited a rare combination of intellectual keenness, emotional warmth and sensitivity.

At the University of Wisconsin he taught, performed and broadcast concerts for 37 years, from 1939 to 1976. There his frequent collaborator was violinist and leader of the Pro Arte Quartet, Rudolf Kolisch.

In 1946 Johansen and his wife Lorraine settled in Blue Mounds, Wisconsin, a rural town approximately 25 miles west of the University of Wisconsin campus. It was here that many of his composing and recording projects took place. Johansen died at home in 1991 at the age of 85.

== Recordings ==
In 1950 he shifted the focus of his performing activity from radio concerts to recording. He established his own label, Artist Direct, where he made recordings of nearly all Liszt's compositions for piano, researching and uncovering many previously unknown works. His recorded output of Liszt totals 51 LP records. In addition, he produced 43 albums of Bach, 20 of his own compositions, and seven discs each of the piano music of Ferruccio Busoni and Ignaz Friedman. He also recorded his Historical Recital Series (see above) in full (12 discs).

Johansen was a prolific composer with a catalogue of nearly 750 compositions in various forms: 31 piano sonatas, 551 improvised sonatas, three piano concertos, three violin sonatas, a large work for orchestra ("Variations, Disguises, and Fugue on a Merry Theme of Cyrus McCormick"), along with works for string quartet, oboe, and vocal ensembles.
