= Roberta E. Sebenthall =

American writer

- Born: Roberta Elisabeth Sebenthall; January 6, 1917; Eau Claire, Wisconsin, U.S.
- Died: January 27, 1979 (age 62); Mount Horeb, Wisconsin, U.S.
- Other names: R. E. Sebenthall, Betty Sebenthall, Paul Kruger, Harry Davis, Roberta Hill
- Occupation: Writer

Roberta Elisabeth "Betty" Sebenthall (January 6, 1917 - January 27, 1979) was an American novelist and poet, based in Wisconsin. She published fifteen detective novels and several volumes of poetry, sometimes under masculine pseudonyms.

== Early life and education ==
Sebenthall was born in Eau Claire, Wisconsin, and raised in Mount Horeb, the daughter of Robert Graham Sebenthall and Laura Rosalie Cote Sebenthall. Her father was a businessman.

== Career ==
Sebenthall worked in a munitions plant during World War II. She wrote fifteen detective novels and several volumes of poetry, sometimes under masculine pseudonyms, including "Paul Kruger" and "Harry Davis". She also wrote book reviews for the Milwaukee Journal, and local history articles for the Wisconsin State Journal.

August Derleth praised Sebenthall's first poetry collection, Acquainted with a Chance of Bobcats (1969), for "a freshness of language, a vividness of imagery that comes naturally from her pen, without straining for effect." "Sebenthall's poems are formal recollections of a natural ethic," explains one scholar. "Through her poetry, she attempts to see primeval qualities, feelings, in this time of more civilized modes."

In 1968 Sebenthall was awarded the Writer's Cup by the Madison chapter of Theta Sigma Pi. In 1970 she received a grant from the National Endowment for the Humanities for her writing.

== Publications ==
- "To Guadalcanal and Back" (1943, short story, as Harry Davis)
- The Desperate Wall (1949, as Roberta Hill)
- Portrait of Rene (1956, as Harry Davis)
- My Brother's Wife (1956, as Harry Davis)
- A Bullet for a Blonde (1958, as Paul Kruger)
- Dig Her a Grave (1960, as Paul Kruger)
- Bedroom Alibi (1961, as Paul Kruger)
- "Thoreau" (1961, poem)
- A Message for Marise (1963, as Paul Kruger)
- "Lone Wolf" (1963, poem)
- "Easter Island" (1963, poem)
- Weep for Willow Green (1966, as Paul Kruger)
- Weave a Wicked Web (1967, as Paul Kruger)
- "The Holy Indigents" (1967)
- If the Shroud Fits (1968, as Paul Kruger)
- The Finish Line (1968, as Paul Kruger)
- Acquainted with a Chance of Bobcats (1969, poems)
- "The Artisan as Hero" (1971, poem)
- The Bronze Claws (1972, as Paul Kruger)
- The Cold Ones (1972, as Paul Kruger)
- Voyages to the Inland Sea (1973, poems, with Thomas McGrath and Robert Dana)
- "The Villages" (1975, poem)
- Anatomy of a December (1978, poems)

== Personal life ==
Sebenthall had a longtime personal partnership with Mary T. Locke; they met in New York City in 1940. Sebenthall died from emphysema in 1979, at the age of 62, in Mount Horeb. Locke died within months after Sebenthall, and the two women share a gravesite in Mount Horeb. The Mount Horeb Area Historical Society holds a collection of Sebenthall's books, paintings, and other materials.
