= Leptothrix cholodnii =

Scientific classification
- Domain: Bacteria
- Kingdom: Pseudomonadati
- Phylum: Pseudomonadota
- Class: Betaproteobacteria
- Order: Burkholderiales
- Genus: Leptothrix
- Species: L. cholodnii

Binomial name
- Leptothrix cholodnii Mulder and van Veen 1963

Type strain
- LVMW 99

Species of bacterium

Leptothrix cholodnii is a bacterium from the genus Leptothrix, which has the ability to oxidize Fe(II). They were previously known as Leptothrix discophora SP-6. They are fast-growing metal oxidizers in iron-rich environments. These environments include freshwater bodies characterized with neutral to slightly acidic pH, oxygen gradients and organic matter. Examples of these sites include freshwater streams and wetlands, iron seeps, water pipes, surface of sediments. Their growth under suitable conditions is easily recognized with fluffy microbial mats, surface biofilms made up of oxidized Fe and Mn minerals with orange to dark brown color. They can oxidize both Fe(II) and Mn(II). Leptothrix cholodnii SP-6 is a member of this group with an isolate and sheath-former under laboratory conditions.

== Metabolism ==
They grow as aerobic, chemoorganoheterotrophs under circumneutral pH conditions. They can utilize a range of organic carbon substrates as electron donors.
