= Leptothrix (bacterium) =

Scientific classification
- Domain: Bacteria
- Kingdom: Pseudomonadati
- Phylum: Pseudomonadota
- Class: Betaproteobacteria
- Order: Burkholderiales
- Family: Sphaerotilaceae
- Genus: Leptothrix; Kützing 1843

Type species
- Leptothrix ochracea (Roth 1797) Kützing 1843

Species
- Leptothrix cholodnii Mulder and van Veen 1963; Leptothrix discophora (ex Schwers 1912) Spring et al. 1997; Leptothrix lopholea Dorff 1934; Leptothrix mobilis Spring et al. 1997; Leptothrix ochracea (Roth 1797) Kützing 1843

Synonyms
- Detoniella Trevisan in de Toni and Trevisan 1889; Chlamydothrix Migula 1900

Genus of bacteria

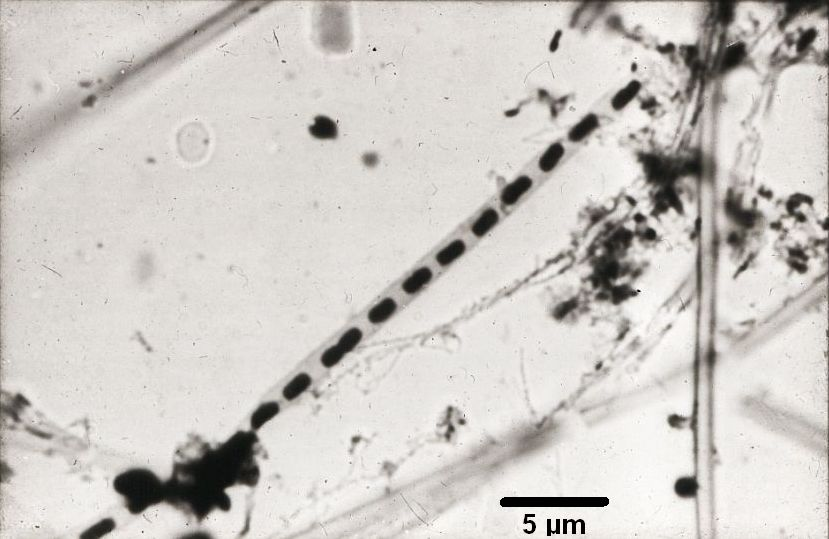
Leptothrix - chain of cells in a sheath and empty sheaths

Leptothrix is a genus of Gram-negative bacteria in the class Betaproteobacteria. The name is from the Greek leptos thrix (literally "fine hair"). They occur in standing or slow-flowing, ferruginous, neutral to slightly acidic fresh waters with only low concentrations of organic matter. The energy metabolism of Leptothrix is strictly aerobic, oxidative, and chemoorganoheterotrophic. Five species are known: L. ochracea, L. discophora, L. cholodnii, L. lopholea, and L. mobilis.
