= Hyllestad quernstone quarries =

Quarries in Vestland, Norway

The Hyllestad quernstone quarries are located in Hyllestad Municipality in Vestland county, Norway. They are the oldest and one of the largest production areas for quernstones and millstones in Norway with approximately 400 quarries identified. The natural condition for the quernstone and millstone production in the area is the rock type garnet mica schist. The quarries are located from the shoreline up to an elevation of about 200 metres (660 ft) above sea level, but a majority of the quarries are situated less than 1 kilometre (0.62 mi) from the sea and closest harbor. The quarries are well preserved, visible, and most of them are easily accessible. In the Viking period and the Middle Ages, quernstones were shaped and carved directly from the bedrock, and in several of the quarries unfinished quernstones and millstones are still attached to the rock. The large scale production has since Viking times led to severe changes of the landscape. Quarries and spoil heaps are so densely situated that the original topography is not visible anymore. Two harbors are also identified. Here, large amounts of quern and millstones as well as ballast stones are located on the sea bed, testifying to the activity of loading and unloading that once took place here. From the 1600s, the production in Hyllestad started to decrease. In the early modern period a new technology came into use in the quarries – the use of gunpowder. This production lasted until 1930. Thus, the quernstone quarries in Hyllestad represent a history spread over about 1200 years.

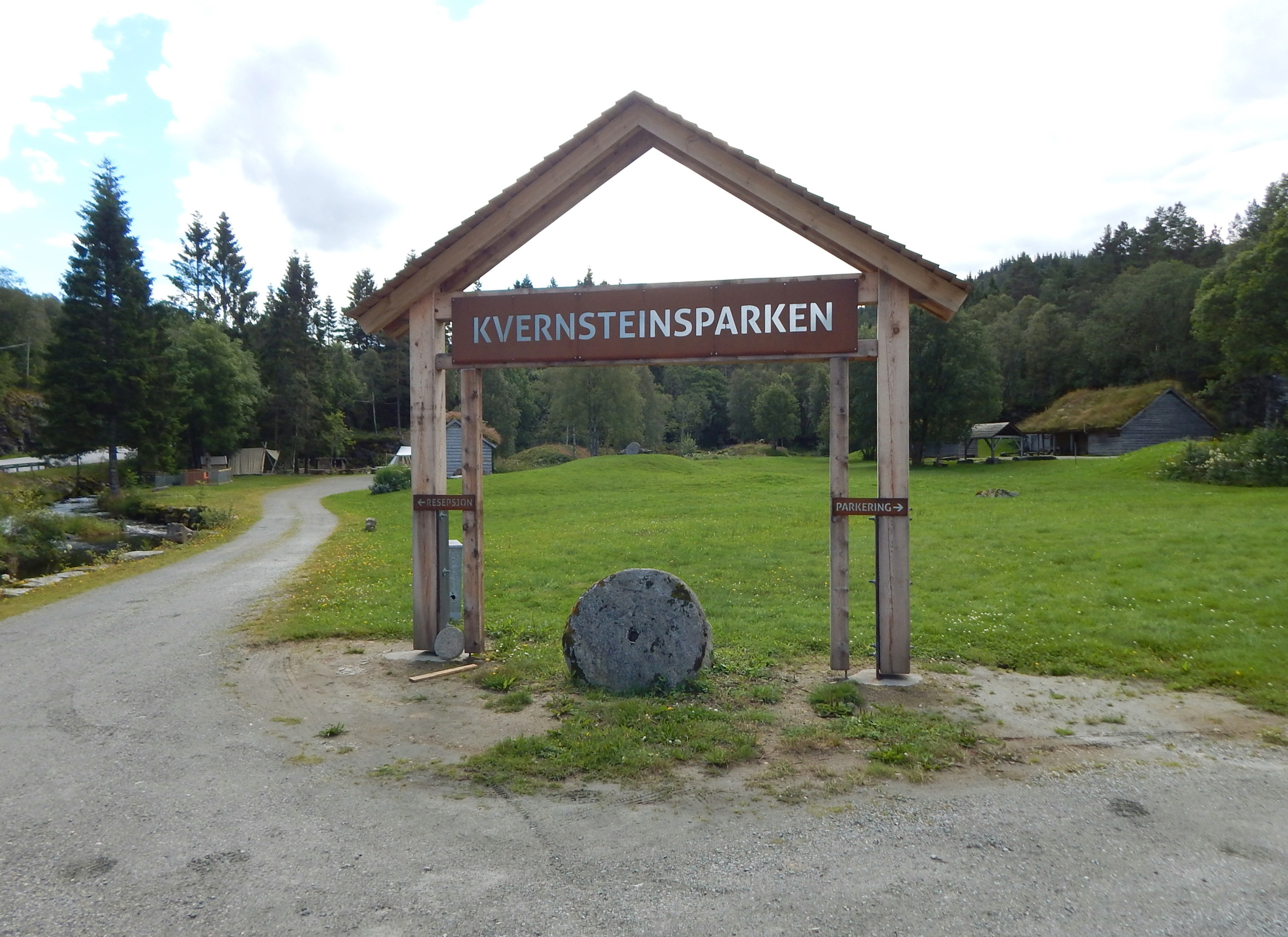

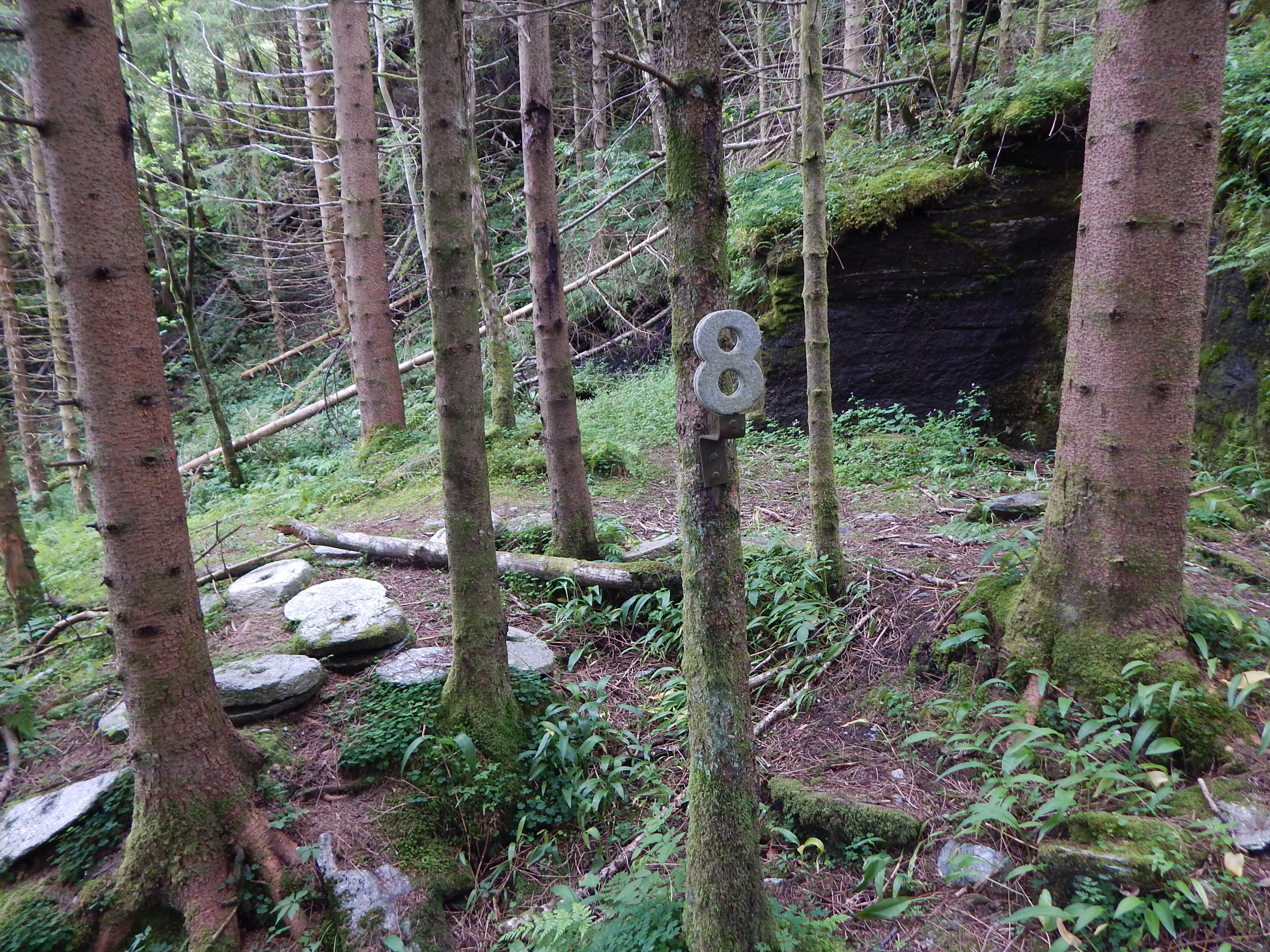

== Products ==
The main product from Hyllestad was quernstones for hand querns. This was a hand-operated quern that consisted of two circular stones. The quern was an important tool in the household, and the quernstones were serial products aimed at larger markets and produced for people from different levels of the society. In the Middle Ages, the range of products in the quarries had been expanded, including millstones for watermills, stone crosses, and grave slabs. The stone crosses from Hyllestad are located along the coast of Vestland and Rogaland counties. Stone crosses and grave slabs were most likely commissioned products ordered by actors from the upper strata of the society.

== Distribution and trade ==
Quern and millstones from Hyllestad were widely distributed, and were parts of an international trade network in the Viking Age and the Middle Ages. Several wrecked cargoes with quern and millstones are found along the Norwegian coast. The stones from Hyllestad are found in large parts of Norway, but they were also exported to Sweden, Denmark, Northern Germany, and the North Atlantic islands. The distribution started around the year 950, with an increase in the Middle Ages when Bergen acted as an important staple for quern and millstones.

== Millstone Park ==
Millstone Park was established within the production area, as an area of dissemination of the history of quernstone production. A culture trail has been made through the park where quarries, quernstones, millstones, and spoil heaps are densely located. An activity arena with houses and equipment is located outside the actual cultural heritage area in Millstone Park. This is used in activity-based communication, whereby visitors can observe and try stone cutting, working at the forge, using hand querns and the like. Two cargoes with quern and millstones stemming from old shipwrecks are displayed in the park. The Millstone Park was opened by Queen Sonja in 2002.

=== World Heritage Site ===
The Hyllestad quernstone quarries were nominated for UNESCO’s World Heritage list, as part of a transnational serial nomination: Viking Age Sites in Northern Europe.
