= Margaret E. Hillestad =

Norwegian politician (born 1961)

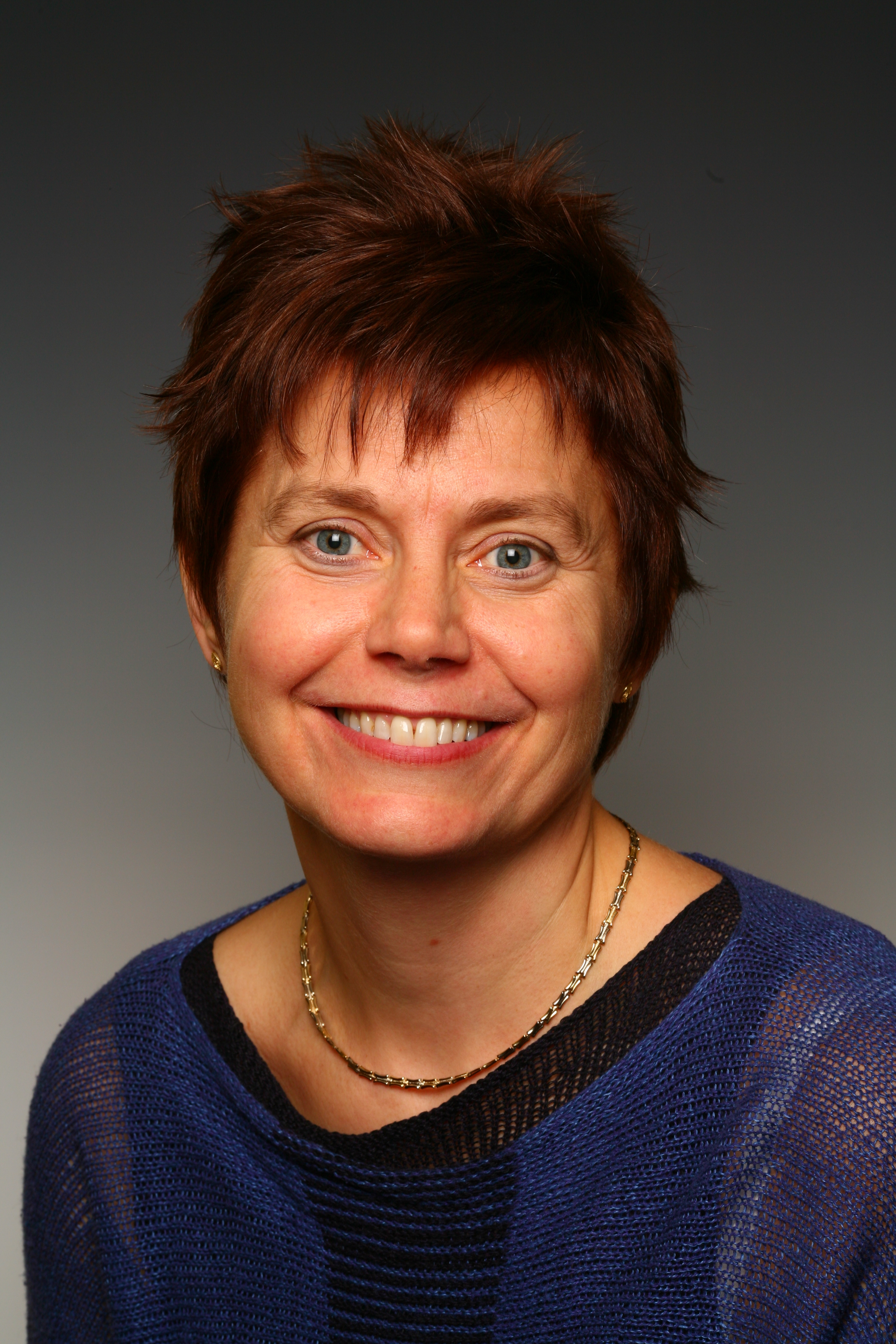
- Hillestad in 2009

First deputy member of the Norwegian Parliament for Oslo
- In office 1993–1997

Personal details
- Born: 14 February 1961 (age 65)
- Party: Center Party
- Education: University of Oslo

Margaret Eide Hillestad (born 14 February 1961, in Oslo) is a Norwegian politician for the Centre Party and a former deputy MP.

== Education and professional background ==
Hillestad is an economist with a cand.oecon. degree from the University of Oslo (1988), and works as a project leader for the research institute AgriAnalyse.

== Political career ==
She was President of the Centre Party Women's Association and a member of the executive board of the Centre Party 2005–2010. She has also been leader of Oslo Centre Party and the party's top candidate from Oslo in several parliamentary and municipal elections.

As her party's top candidate from the Oslo constituency, she was elected as the first deputy member of the Norwegian Parliament from Oslo in the 1993 Norwegian parliamentary election and met 105 days as a member of parliament during the term 1993–1997.

She has also been leader of No to the EU in Oslo. She was a deputy member of the Oslo city council 1991–1995. She was also a member of the government-appointed Commission on families and children (1995–1996) which prepared Norwegian Official Report 1996:13 on the government's financial support of families.
