= Edmund Hillestad =

American politician

Edmund Hillestad (January 6, 1861 – September 28, 1946) was an American businessman and member of the South Dakota House of Representatives.

== Biography ==
Hillestad was born in Mount Horeb, Wisconsin. He was the son of Amund Hillestad and Anna Andersdatter Hillestad. His family moved to South Dakota in 1879. He was married to Bertha Thompson Hillestad (1861–1925), with whom he had eight children. Hillestad was president and secretary of the Farmers' Mutual Tornado Insurance and the Farmers' Mutual of Volga. He also served on the board of directors of the First National Bank of Volga. He died in Volga, South Dakota and was buried at the First Lutheran Cemetery in Brookings County, South Dakota.

== Career ==
Hillestad was a member of the House of Representatives twice: first from 1903 to 1906, and again from 1929 to 1932. In addition, he was commissioner of Brookings County, South Dakota. He was a Republican.
