= Blue Mounds, Wisconsin =

Village in U.S. state of Wisconsin

- Village
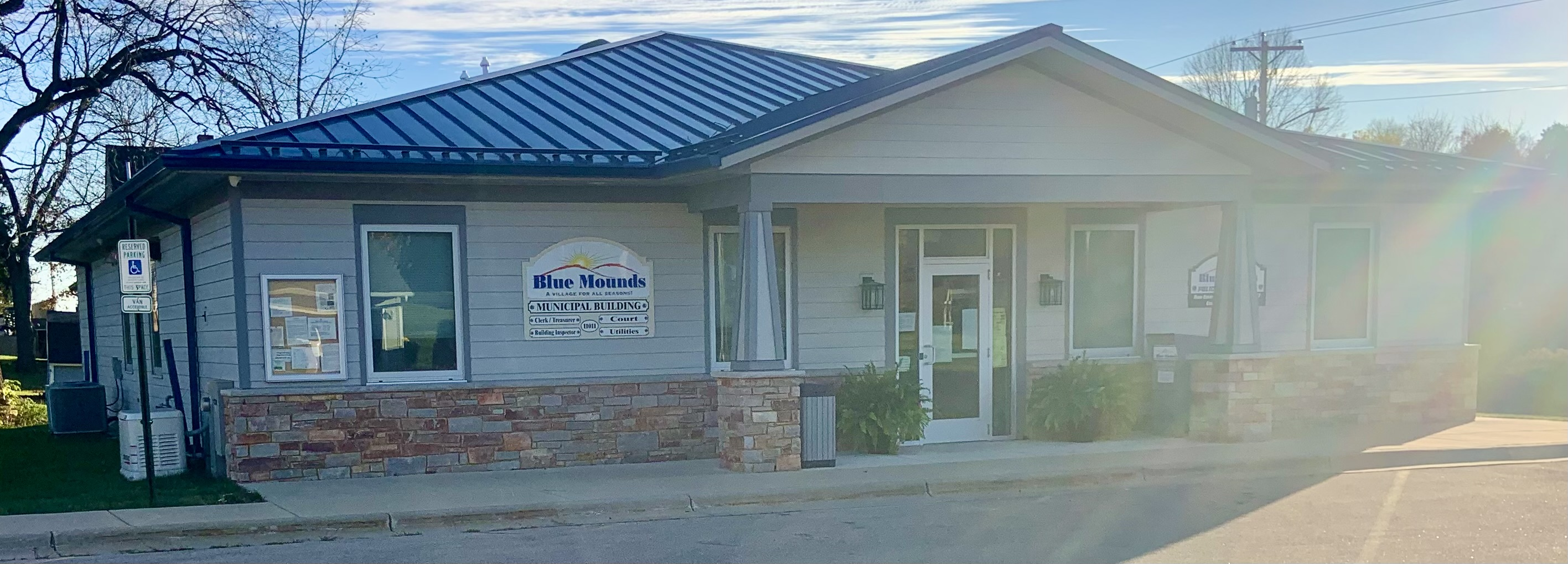
- Village hall

- Location of Blue Mounds in Dane County, Wisconsin
- Coordinates: 43°1′0″N 89°49′50″W
- Country: United States
- State: Wisconsin
- County: Dane

Government
  - Type: Village
  - President: Audra Anderson

Area
  - Total: 0.88 sq mi (2.28 km^{2})
  - Land: 0.88 sq mi (2.28 km^{2})
  - Water: 0 sq mi (0.00 km^{2})
- Elevation: 1,076 ft (328 m)

Population (2020)
  - Total: 948
  - Density: 1,080/sq mi (416/km^{2})
- Time zone: UTC-6 (Central (CST))
  - Summer (DST): UTC-5 (CDT)
- ZIP: 53517
- Area code: 608
- FIPS code: 55-08500
- GNIS feature ID: 1582837
- Website: Village of Blue Mounds

Blue Mounds is a village in Dane County, Wisconsin, United States. As of the 2020 census, the village had a population of 950. The village is adjacent to the Town of Blue Mounds, and is part of the Madison metropolitan area.

Blue Mounds was named by French missionaries for the blueish hue of three nearby mounds.

== Geography ==
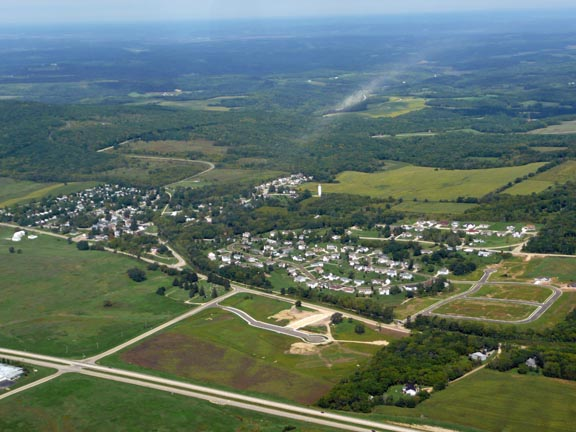

Blue Mounds is located 25 miles (40 km) west of Madison in Dane County near its border with Iowa County. The village is near Brigham Park, the Cave of the Mounds, and Blue Mound State Park, the highest point in southern Wisconsin.

According to the United States Census Bureau, the village has a total area of 0.91 square miles (2.36 km^{2}), all land.

== Demographics ==
Historical population
Census	Pop.	Note	%±
1930	182		—
1940	196		7.7%
1950	207		5.6%
1960	227		9.7%
1970	261		15.0%
1980	387		48.3%
1990	446		15.2%
2000	708		58.7%
2010	855		20.8%
2020	948		10.9%
U.S. Decennial Census

=== 2010 census ===
As of the census of 2010, there were 855 people, 336 households, and 235 families living in the village. The population density was 939.6 inhabitants per square mile (362.8/km^{2}). There were 347 housing units at an average density of 381.3 per square mile (147.2/km^{2}). The racial makeup of the village was 97.8% White, 0.1% African American, 0.4% Native American, 0.5% Asian, 0.5% from other races, and 0.8% from two or more races. Hispanic or Latino people of any race were 1.3% of the population.

There were 336 households, of which 34.8% had children under the age of 18 living with them, 56.5% were married couples living together, 6.0% had a female householder with no husband present, 7.4% had a male householder with no wife present, and 30.1% were non-families. 23.5% of all households were made up of individuals, and 6% had someone living alone who was 65 years of age or older. The average household size was 2.54 and the average family size was 3.02.

The median age in the village was 39.8 years. 27.8% of residents were under the age of 18; 4.6% were between the ages of 18 and 24; 24.9% were from 25 to 44; 34% were from 45 to 64; and 8.7% were 65 years of age or older. The gender makeup of the village was 49.0% male and 51.0% female.

=== 2000 census ===
As of the census of 2000, there were 708 residents, 289 occupied housing units, and 201 families living in the village. The population density was 938.4 people per square mile (364.5/km^{2}). There were 297 housing units at an average density of 393.6 per square mile (152.9/km^{2}). The racial makeup of the village was 97.88% White, 0.42% Native American, 0.71% Asian, 0.14% from other races, and 0.85% from two or more races. 0.99% of the population were Hispanic or Latino of any race.

There were 289 households, out of which 43.6% had children under the age of 18 living with them, 54.7% were married couples living together, 8.0% had a female householder with no husband present, and 30.4% were non-families. 24.9% of all households were made up of individuals, and 7.3% had someone living alone who was 65 years of age or older. The average household size was 2.45 and the average family size was 2.90.

In the village, the population was spread out, with 28.7% under the age of 18, 3.5% from 18 to 24, 39.3% from 25 to 44, 20.2% from 45 to 64, and 8.3% who were 65 years of age or older. The median age was 35 years. For every 100 females, there were 98.3 males. For every 100 females age 18 and over, there were 101.2 males.

The median income for a household in the village was $45,568, and the median income for a family was $52,895. Males had a median income of $37,574 versus $25,188 for females. The per capita income for the village was $25,895. About 1.4% of families and 4.0% of the population were below the poverty line, including 1.9% of those under age 18 and 20.9% of those age 65 or over.

== Recreation ==
The Military Ridge State Trail, a 39-mile (63 km) bicycle trail built on a former railroad right-of-way, runs through the village of Blue Mounds.

Each year the village is the starting point for the Horribly Hilly Hundreds bike ride along area roads that ends in a long, tough climb to the top of Blue Mound State Park. Riders can choose either a 100K or 200K course. The ride is held the Saturday before Father's Day.

In 2010 and 2011 Blue Mounds was a food stop on the 100K route for the annual Centurion race, which started and ended in Middleton, Wisconsin, allowing racers to get food as they pedaled through the area.

The Festival of the Mounds, which takes place at Mounds View Park each fall, includes a chicken wing cook-off, softball tournament, chicken barbecue, and live bands.

The Step Into The Past Rendezvous, sponsored by the Blue Mounds Area Historical Society, has been held each September, but has been run by a private group in recent years, as the Blue Mounds Area Historical Society is in hiatus. The rendezvous includes tepees, wall tents, a period weapons display, demonstrations of spinning and tanning, a tomahawk throw, and a candy cannon for children.

Each winter nearby Blue Mound State Park holds a Candlelight Ski and Hike the first Saturday in January and February.

== Attractions ==
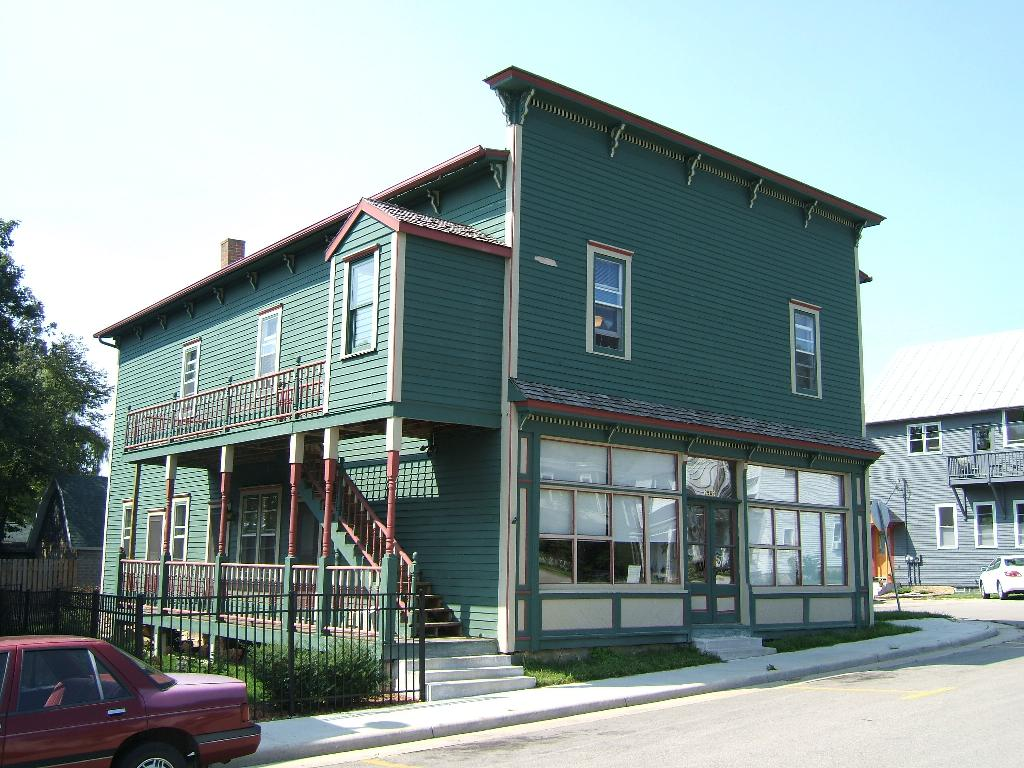
The historic Blue Mounds Opera House

Local tourist attractions include Blue Mound State Park; the Cave of the Mounds, a National Natural Landmark; Tyrol Basin Ski and Snowboard Area; and formerly included Little Norway, a living museum devoted to the region's Norwegian influence. The Blue Mounds Fort historical site is just south of the village but is not easily accessible.

One particularly notable site in the Town of Blue Mounds is Ridglan Farms, a beagle breeding and research facility that has become the focus of major animal welfare investigations and protests. Since 2022, the Wisconsin Department of Agriculture, Trade and Consumer Protection has documented more than 300 alleged animal welfare violations at the facility, including allegations of untreated injuries and improper veterinary procedures, and proposed fines exceeding $55,000. A Dane County judge found probable cause that state animal cruelty laws had been violated, leading to a special prosecutor investigation and a legal settlement in which Ridglan Farms agreed to surrender its state breeding license effective July 1, 2026, though it continues operating under a federal license. On April 18, 2026, hundreds of animal rights activists protesting conditions at the facility were met by law enforcement officers using rubber bullets, tear gas, and pepper spray, an incident that drew national media attention and intensified criticism of both the facility and the official response to protesters. Ridglan Farms has denied allegations of mistreatment.

== Notable residents and natives ==
- Billy Adams, Governor of Colorado
- Ebenezer Brigham, first permanent white settler in Dane County
- Gunnar Johansen, Danish born pianist and composer
- Shelley Ryan, gardener and television host
- Mike Wilkinson, professional basketball player
