= Blue Mound State Park =

State park in Iowa and Dane counties, Wisconsin

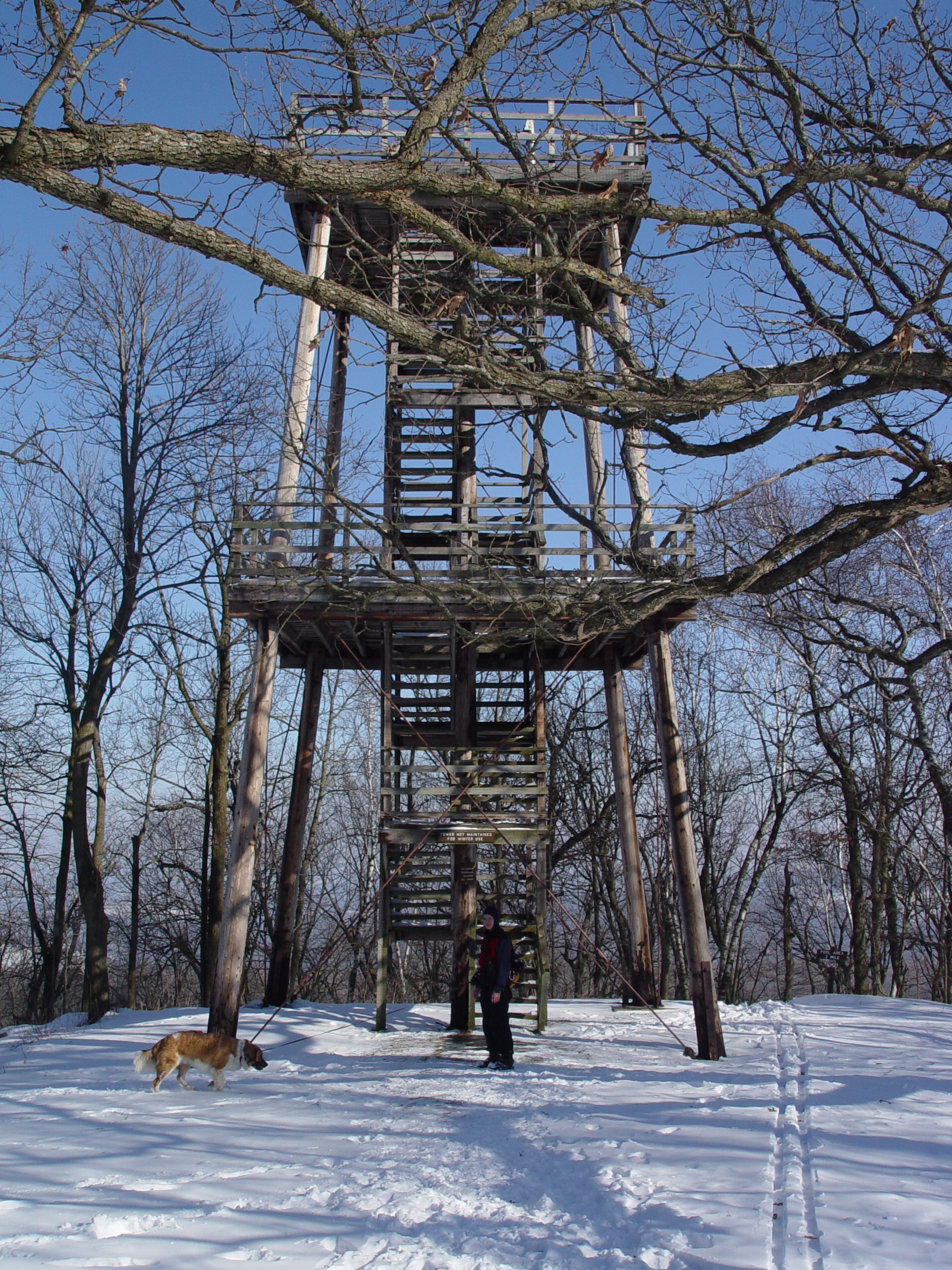
- East observation tower on the Blue Mound

- Location within Wisconsin Location within the United States
- Interactive map of Blue Mound State Park
- Location: Iowa and Dane counties, Wisconsin, United States
- Coordinates: 43°01′41″N 89°51′10″W
- Area: 1,153 acres (467 ha)
- Established: 1959
- Administrator: Wisconsin Department of Natural Resources
- Website: Official website
- Wisconsin State Parks

Blue Mound State Park is a state park in Wisconsin, United States, located atop the largest hill in the southern half of the state, near the village of Blue Mounds. The 1,153-acre (467 ha) park features a pair of observation towers affording views of the Wisconsin River valley and Baraboo Range to the north, the mounds, buttes, and rolling forests of the Driftless Area to the south and west, and the young glacial plains and city of Madison to the east.

== Geology ==
West Blue Mound (elev. 1,719 ft (524 m)), the park's namesake, rises approximately 450 feet (140 m) above the Military Ridge. However, when viewed from several miles to the north or south, the apparent local relief can be 600 to 950 feet (180 to 290 m), as the highest point of the top of the mound sits almost exactly 1,000 feet (300 m) above the Wisconsin River at Arena, 10 miles to the north. This makes West Blue Mound the most prominent peak in the state of Wisconsin. The mountain, as most of the other large mounds of the Driftless Area, is an outlier of Niagara dolomitic limestone. It is a monadnock, having been created through centuries of erosion, with the harder dolomite being more weather-resistant than the other surrounding rock of the region.

== Activities and amenities ==
The park contains a large open field, a swimming pool (the only one in a Wisconsin state park), shelters, campsites, and many miles of trails for hiking, biking, cross-country skiing and snowshoeing. There is a nature center by the picnic area with natural history exhibits. Naturalists offer programs in the summer. The Military Ridge State Trail, which follows the natural east-west contour of the ridgeline from Fitchburg to Dodgeville, abuts on the southern edge of the park.

The park is used as the finish line for the Horribly Hilly Hundreds bicycle challenge ride. In Chicago's bid for the 2016 Summer Olympics, the park would have contained the finish line for the road cycling race.

== Friends of Blue Mound State Park ==
A volunteer group, the Friends of Blue Mound State Park, is a group of volunteers working to benefit the park by enhancing and preserving its natural resources, while offering activities and projects that improve the park guests' visits. The Friends play a key role in many special events, including the annual Candlelight Ski, annual campout, trail construction and interpretive presentations.

== Places of interest ==
- East viewing tower
- West viewing tower
- Pleasure Valley
- Picnic area (at the top of the Hill and the top of several hiking trails)
- Pool and splash pad (summer only)
- Indian Tree Marker

== Gallery ==
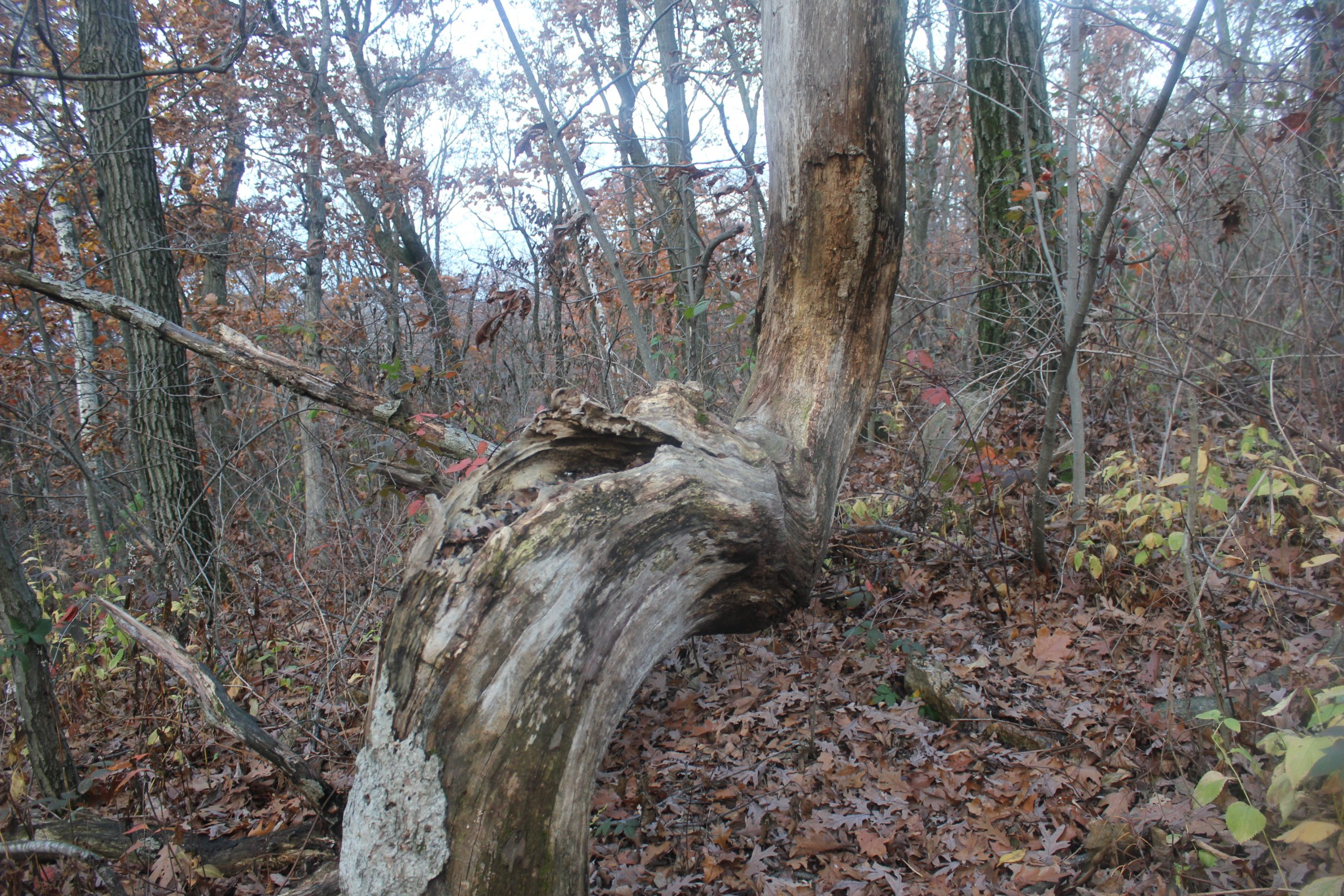
Indian Tree Marker

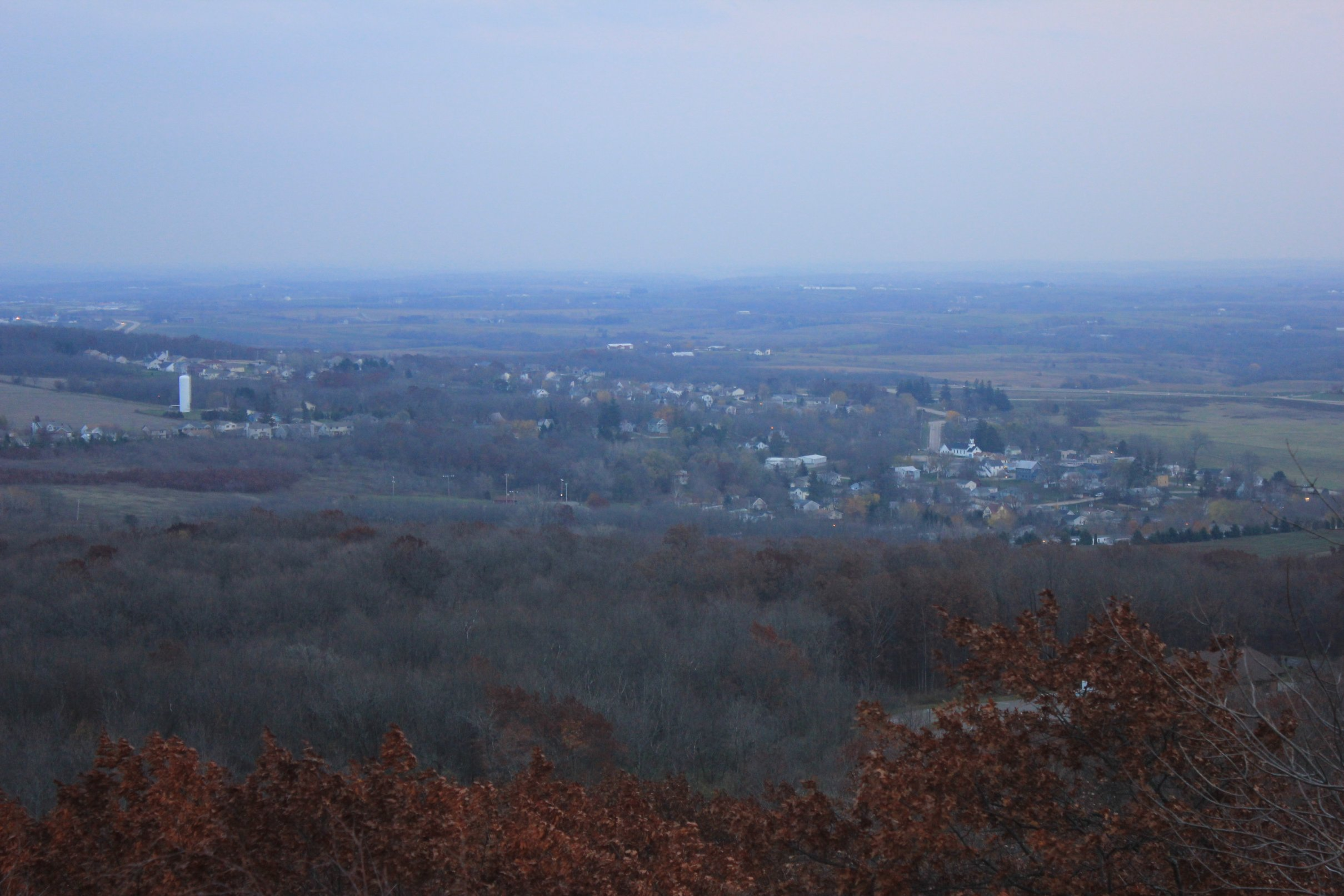
View from the top of east tower

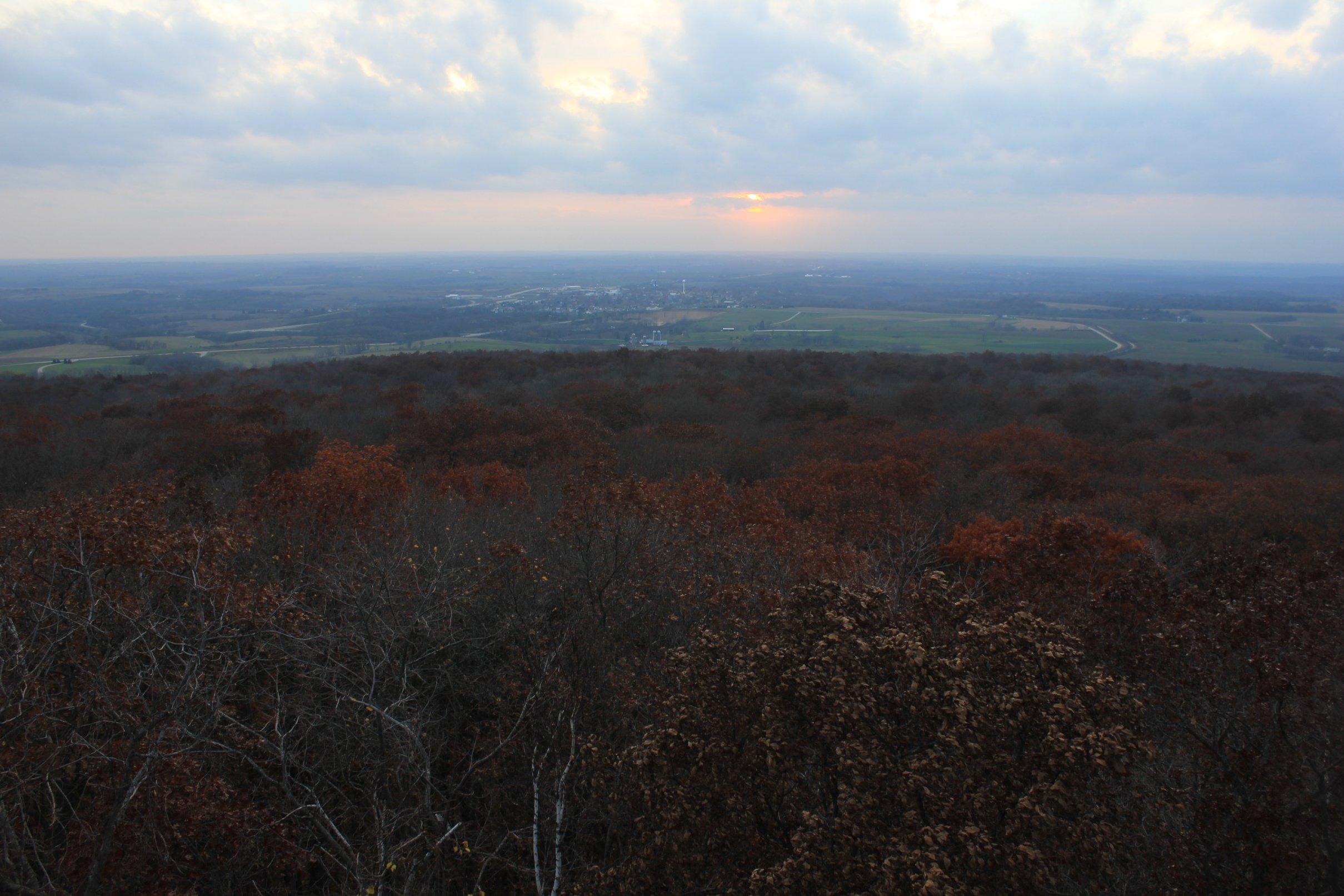
View from the top of west tower

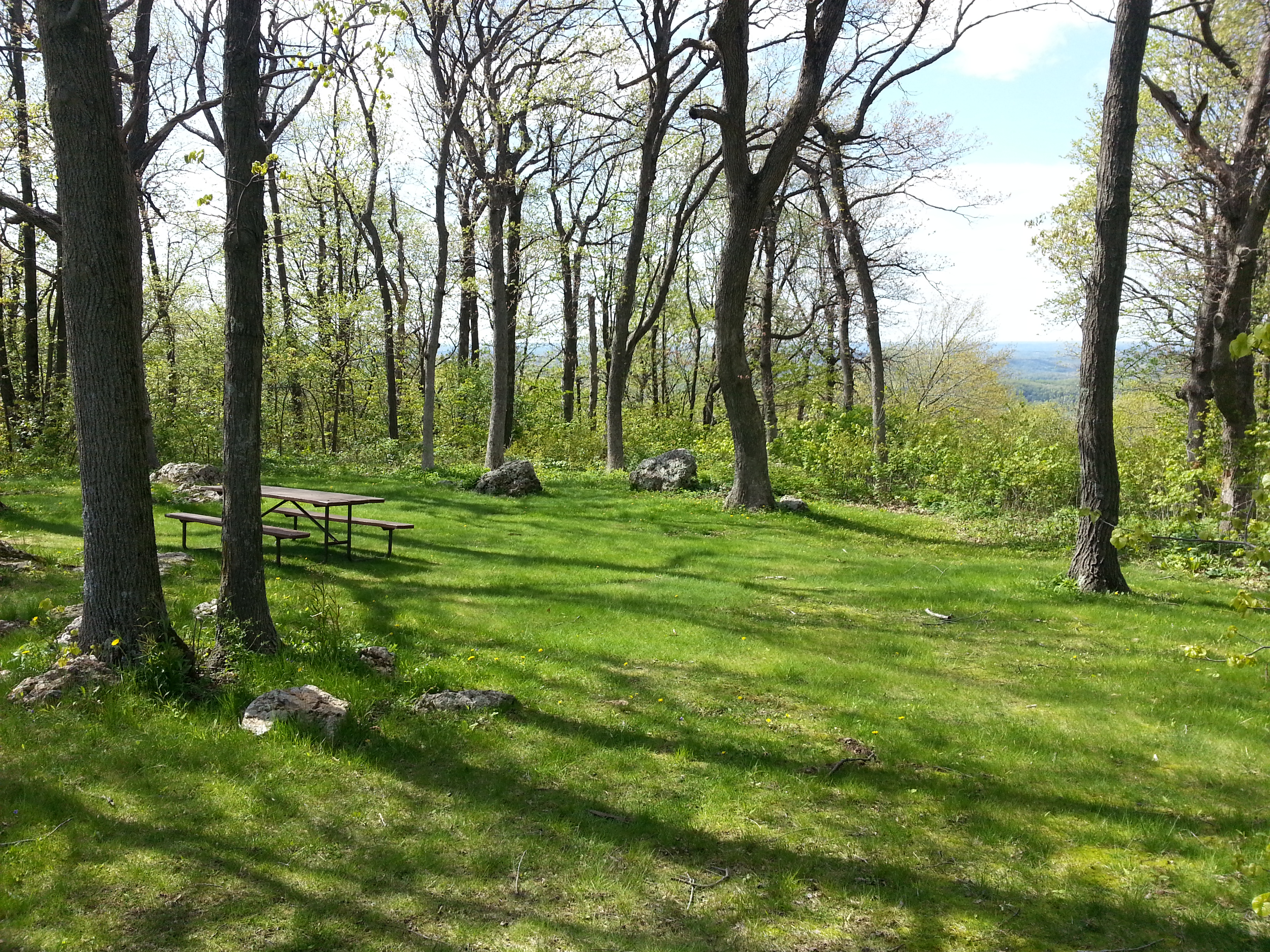
View of and from the northern slope
