= Roberts House =

Roberts House, Roberts Homestead, Roberts Farm, or variations, may refer to:

in the United States

(by state then city)

- Petty-Roberts-Beatty House, Clayton, Alabama, listed on the NRHP in Alabama
- Roberts House (Mobile, Alabama), listed on the NRHP in Alabama
- Roberts House (Prescott, Arizona), listed on the NRHP in Arizona
- Roberts Farm Historic and Archeological District, Tallahassee, Florida, NRHP-listed
- Roberts Ranch, Immokalee, Florida, NRHP-listed
- House at 7306 St. Augustine Road, Jacksonville, Florida, also known as the Roberts House, NRHP-listed
- Alfred W. Roberts House, Ball Ground, Georgia, listed on the NRHP in Georgia
- Hitchcock-Roberts House, Monticello, Georgia, listed on the NRHP in Georgia
- Col. William T. Roberts House, Douglasville, Georgia, listed on the NRHP in Georgia
- John Spencer Roberts House, Columbus, Georgia, listed on the NRHP in Georgia
- Isaac Roberts House, Sandy Springs, Georgia, listed on the NRHP in Georgia
- Hitchcock-Roberts House, Monticello, Georgia, listed on the NRHP in Georgia
- Roberts-McGregor House, Warrenton, Georgia, listed on the NRHP in Georgia
- William H. Roberts House, Pecatonica, Illinois, listed on the NRHP in Illinois
- Roberts-Morton House, Newburgh, Indiana, listed on the NRHP in Indiana
- Edward C. Roberts House, Davenport, Iowa, NRHP-listed
- Roberts Octagon Barn, Sharon Center, Iowa, listed on the NRHP in Iowa
- John N. Roberts House, Lawrence, Kansas, listed on the NRHP in Kansas
- Wesley Roberts House, Cynthiana, Kentucky, listed on the NRHP in Kentucky
- Earl Roberts House, Colfax, Louisiana, listed on the NRHP in Louisiana
- Sargent-Roberts House, Bangor, Maine, listed on the NRHP in Maine
- Littlefield-Roberts House, Cambridge, Massachusetts, listed on the NRHP in Massachusetts
- Roberts House (Reading, Massachusetts), listed on the NRHP in Massachusetts
- Martin W. Roberts House, Kalamazoo, Michigan, listed on the NRHP in Michigan
- Jones-Roberts Farmstead, Lake Crystal, Minnesota, listed on the NRHP in Minnesota
- J. F. Roberts Octagonal Barn, Rea, Missouri, listed on the NRHP in Missouri
- Foreman-Roberts House Carson City, Nevada, listed on the NRHP in Nevada
- W. C. Record House, also known as Roberts House, Winnemucca, Nevada, NRHP-listed
- Judge Nathan S. Roberts House, Canastota, New York, listed on the NRHP in New York
- Roberts Hall (Ithaca, New York), listed on the NRHP in New York
- Eure-Roberts House, Gatesville, North Carolina, listed on the NRHP in North Carolina
- Roberts-Carter House, Gatesville, North Carolina, listed on the NRHP in North Carolina
- Holden-Roberts Farm, Hillsborough, North Carolina, listed on the NRHP in North Carolina
- Roberts-Justice House, Kernersville, North Carolina, listed on the NRHP in North Carolina
- Roberts-Vaughan House, Murfreesboro, North Carolina, listed on the NRHP in North Carolina
- Roberts House (Canonsburg, Pennsylvania), listed on the NRHP in Pennsylvania
- Roberts Farm Site, Conestoga, Pennsylvania, listed on the NRHP in Pennsylvania
- Strickland-Roberts Homestead, Kimberton, Pennsylvania, listed on the NRHP in Pennsylvania
- Roberts-Quay House, Philadelphia, Pennsylvania, listed on the NRHP in Philadelphia, Pennsylvania
- Enoch Roberts House, Quakertown, Pennsylvania, listed on the NRHP in Pennsylvania
- Nathan J. and Nancy Roberts House, Abilene, Texas, listed on the NRHP in Texas
- Dr. Rufus A. Roberts House, Cedar Hill, Texas, listed on the NRHP in Texas
- Sheeks-Robertson House, Austin, Texas, listed on the NRHP in Texas
- B. H. Roberts, Louisa Smith and Cecilia Dibble, House, Centerville, Utah, listed on the NRHP in Utah
- William D. Roberts House, Provo, Utah, listed on the NRHP in Utah
- Roberts House (Barneveld, Wisconsin), listed on the NRHP in Wisconsin

== See also ==
- Robertson House (disambiguation)
- Roberts Building (disambiguation)
- Roberts Chapel (disambiguation)
- Roberts County Courthouse (disambiguation)
