= Robertson House =

Robertson House or Robertson Farm may refer to:

- Robertson House (Kensett, Arkansas)
- Giboney-Robertson-Stewart House, in Wynne, Arkansas
- T.H. Robertson House, in Fort Collins, Colorado, listed on the NRHP in Larimer County, Colorado
- Kidd-Robertson House, in LaGrange, Georgia, listed on the NRHP in Troup County, Georgia
- Robertson House (Eureka, Kansas)
- Samuel Robertson House, in Elizabethtown, Kentucky, listed on the NRHP in Hardin County, Kentucky
- Robertson House (Hemp Ridge, Kentucky)
- Boyle-Robertson-Letcher House, in Lancaster, Kentucky, listed on the NRHP in Garrard County, Kentucky
- Robertson Place, in Tyrone, Kentucky, listed on the NRHP in Woodford County, Kentucky
- Eugene P. Robertson House, in Albion, Michigan
- Robertson-Yates House, in Hernando, Mississippi
- Cooke-Robertson House, in Sandusky, Ohio, listed on the NRHP in Erie County, Ohio
- Dr. and Mrs. Charles G. Robertson House and Garden, in Salem, Oregon, listed on the NRHP in Marion County, Oregon
- Robertson-Easterling-McLaurin House, in Bennettsville, South Carolina
- William Robertson House, in Pinopolis, South Carolina
- Robertson Family Farm, in Whiteville, Tennessee
- Sheeks-Robertson House, in Austin, Texas
- Col. Elijah Sterling Clack Robertson Plantation, in Salado, Texas
- Judge William J. Robertson House, in Charlottesville, Virginia
- John A. and Martha Robertson House, in Lodi, Wisconsin

== See also ==
- Roberts House (disambiguation)
