= Roberts Building =

Roberts Building may refer to:

in the United Kingdom

- Roberts Building (University College London), in Bloomsbury.

in the United States

(by state then city)

- Roberts Building (Great Falls, Montana), listed on the NRHP in Cascade County, Montana
- Roberts and Mander Stove Company Buildings, Hatboro, Pennsylvania, NRHP-listed
- Roberts-Banner Building, El Paso, Texas, listed on the National Register of Historic Places in Texas
- Roberts Building (Nacogdoches, Texas), listed on the NRHP in Nacogdoches County, Texas

== See also ==
- Roberts House (disambiguation)
- Roberts Chapel (disambiguation)
- Roberts County Courthouse (disambiguation)
