= East Hamilton Avenue Historic District =

Historic district in Arkansas, US

- U.S. National Register of Historic Places
- U.S. Historic district
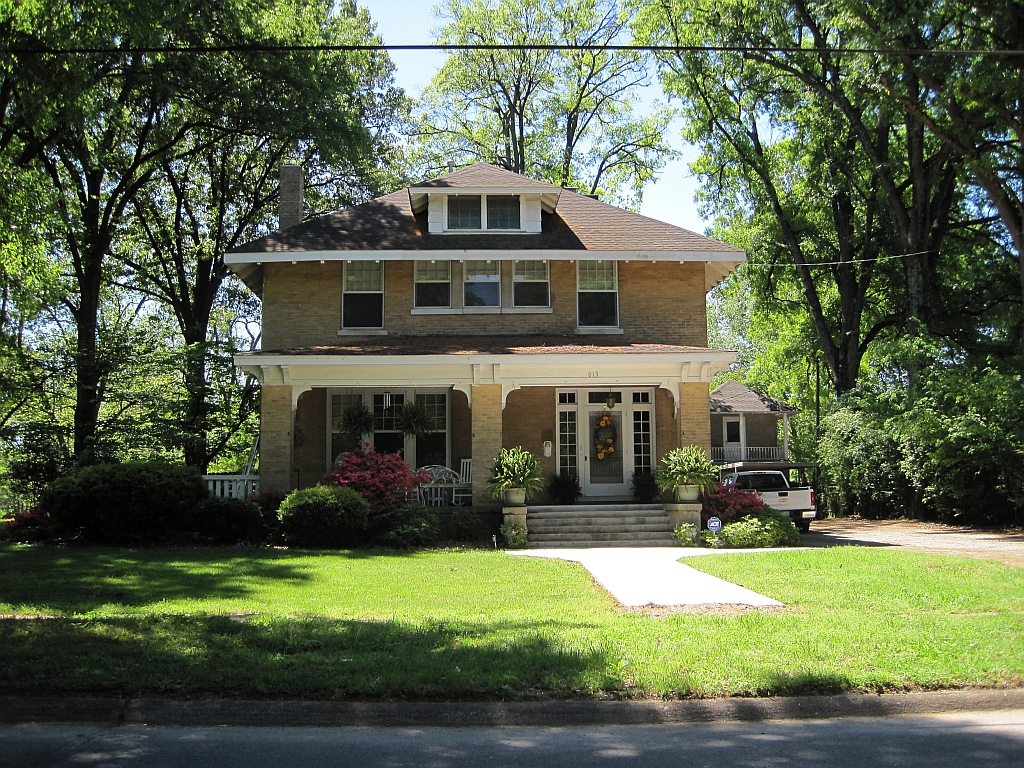
- House on East Hamilton

- Location within Arkansas Location within the United States
- Location: E. Hamilton Ave. between N. Falls Blvd. & N. Killough Rd.; Eldridge Ct., Wynne, Arkansas
- Coordinates: 35°13′31″N 90°48′51″W
- Area: 30.5 acres (12.3 ha)
- Built: 1895
- Architectural style: Late 19th and early 20th century American movements, Late Victorian
- NRHP reference No.: 110003330
- Added to NRHP: June 8, 2011

The East Hamilton Avenue Historic District encompasses a 20th-century residential area of Wynne, Arkansas, reflecting its growth between approximately 1920 and 1940. It extends along East Hamilton Avenue, between North Falls Boulevard and Killough Road, and includes properties on Eldridge Court. East Hamilton Avenue represents the best-preserved area of development from this period and was developed gradually beginning in the late 19th century, growing from west (near Wynne's downtown) to east. The oldest house in the district, the Giboney-Robertson-Stewart House, is a Queen Anne Victorian built circa 1895. Most of the houses were built after 1920 and are predominantly Craftsman, Colonial Revival, and Tudor Revival in character. There are a few Spanish (Mediterranean) Revival houses and a few early ranch houses, which were generally built between 1940 and 1950.

The district was listed on the National Register of Historic Places in 2011.

== See also ==
- National Register of Historic Places listings in Cross County, Arkansas
