= Barneveld, Wisconsin =

- Village
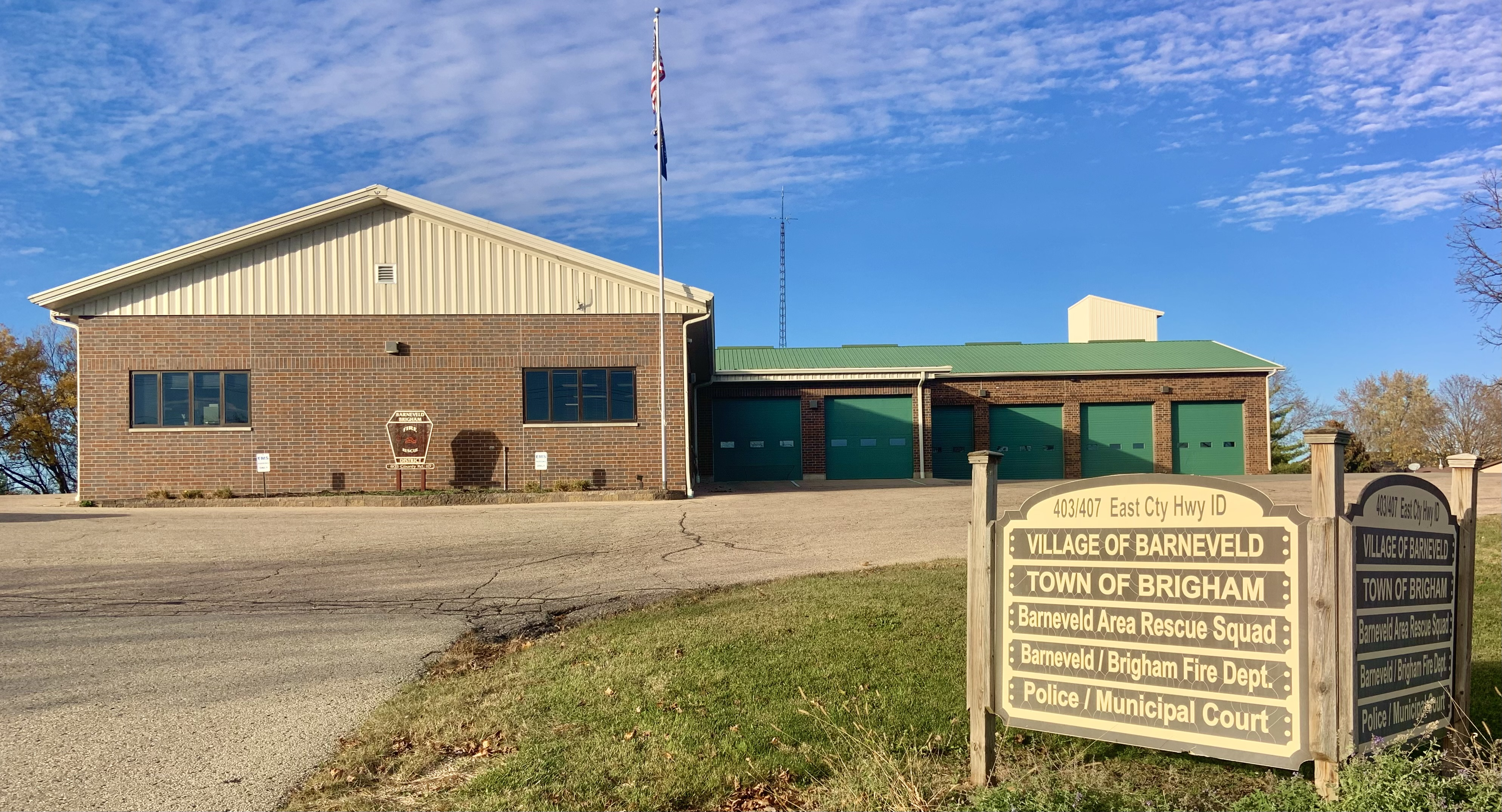
- Barneveld Village hall also the Brigham Town Hall

- Location of Barneveld in Iowa County, Wisconsin.
- Coordinates: 43°0′51″N 89°53′44″W
- Country: United States
- State: Wisconsin
- County: Iowa

Area
  - Total: 1.92 sq mi (4.97 km^{2})
  - Land: 1.92 sq mi (4.97 km^{2})
  - Water: 0 sq mi (0.00 km^{2})
- Elevation: 1,227 ft (374 m)

Population (2020)
  - Total: 1,331
  - Density: 652.3/sq mi (251.86/km^{2})
- Time zone: UTC-6 (Central (CST))
  - Summer (DST): UTC-5 (CDT)
- Area code: 608
- FIPS code: 55-04775
- GNIS feature ID: 1561183
- Website: barneveldwi.gov

Barneveld is a village in Iowa County, Wisconsin, United States. The population was 1,331 at the 2020 census. It is part of the Madison Metropolitan Statistical Area.

The community was named after John of Barneveld of the Netherlands.

== Geography ==
Barneveld is located at 43°0′51″N 89°53′44″W (43.014223, -89.895551).

According to the United States Census Bureau, the village has a total area of 1.94 square miles (5.02 km^{2}), all land.

== Demographics ==
Historical population
Census	Pop.	Note	%±
1910	317		—
1920	289		−8.8%
1930	301		4.2%
1940	358		18.9%
1950	373		4.2%
1960	420		12.6%
1970	528		25.7%
1980	579		9.7%
1990	660		14.0%
2000	1,088		64.8%
2010	1,231		13.1%
2020	1,331		8.1%
U.S. Decennial Census

=== 2010 census ===
As of the census of 2010, there were 1,231 people, 457 households, and 331 families living in the village. The population density was 634.5 inhabitants per square mile (245.0/km^{2}). There were 477 housing units at an average density of 245.9 per square mile (94.9/km^{2}). The racial makeup of the village was 98.2% White, 0.7% African American, 0.1% Native American, 0.2% Asian, 0.1% Pacific Islander, and 0.7% from two or more races. Hispanic or Latino of any race were 0.2% of the population.

There were 457 households, of which 43.1% had children under the age of 18 living with them, 60.2% were married couples living together, 9.2% had a female householder with no husband present, 3.1% had a male householder with no wife present, and 27.6% were non-families. 22.1% of all households were made up of individuals, and 9% had someone living alone who was 65 years of age or older. The average household size was 2.67 and the average family size was 3.16.

The median age in the village was 32.4 years. 30.5% of residents were under the age of 18; 5.5% were between the ages of 18 and 24; 34.2% were from 25 to 44; 21.5% were from 45 to 64; and 8.2% were 65 years of age or older. The gender makeup of the village was 49.1% male and 50.9% female.

=== 2000 census ===
As of the census of 2000, there were 1,088 people, 396 households, and 298 families living in the village. The population density was 805.7 people per square mile (311.2/km^{2}). There were 400 housing units at an average density of 296.2 per square mile (114.4/km^{2}). The racial makeup of the village was 98.71% White, 0.28% African American, 0.37% Native American, 0.09% Asian, and 0.55% from two or more races. Hispanic or Latino of any race were 0.09% of the population.

There were 396 households, out of which 43.2% had children under the age of 18 living with them, 60.4% were married couples living together, 8.8% had a female householder with no husband present, and 24.7% were non-families. Households made up of individuals numbered 22.2% and 9.1% had someone living alone who was 65 years of age or older. The average household size was 2.72 and the average family size was 3.16

In the village, the population was spread out, with 30.7% under the age of 18, 6.4% from 18 to 24, 39.8% from 25 to 44, 14.4% from 45 to 64, and 8.6% who were 65 years of age or older. The median age was 32 years. For every 100 females, there were 107.2 males. For every 100 females age 18 and over, there were 1000 males

The median income for a household in the village was $56,000, and the median income for a family was $58,393. Males had a median income of $34,107 versus $25,480 for females The per capita income for the village was $22,009. About 4.7% of families and 7.5% of the population were below the poverty line, including 12.2% of those under age 18 and 5.5% of those age 65 or over. The largest employer in the village is Vortex Optics with approximately 210 employees.

== 1984 Tornado ==
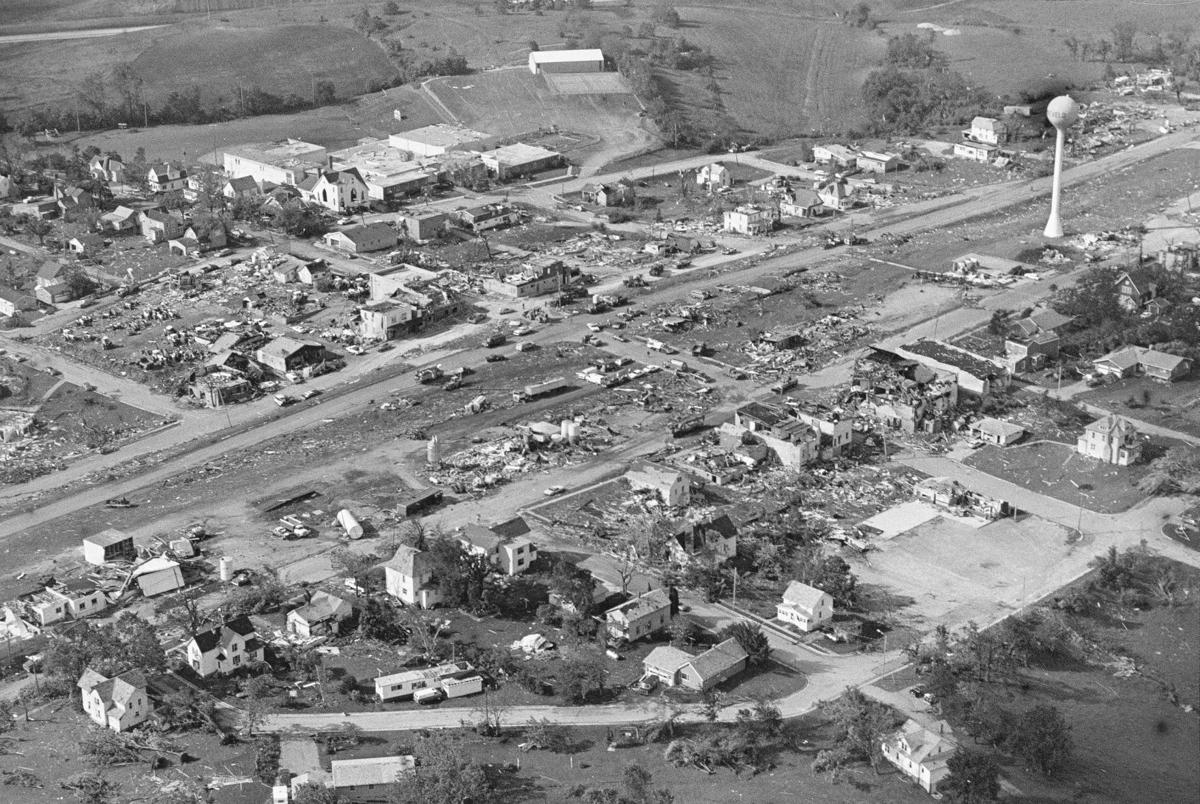
An aerial photo showing Barneveld after the 1984 tornado.

At 12:41 AM CDT on June 8, 1984, a powerful tornado tore through Barneveld. It was part of a large outbreak of storms that started the evening before with tornadoes also touching down in Kansas, Missouri, Iowa, and Minnesota. Although a tornado watch had been issued late on the night of June 7, most residents were unaware that a storm was approaching until they were awakened by a lightning strike and an instantaneous clap of thunder just before 12:41 AM CDT. The 0.4-mile (0.60-km) wide tornado caused F5 damage, the highest level on the Fujita scale. Two hundred of the village's 584 residents were injured and nine were killed. Seventeen of the 18 businesses in Barneveld were destroyed, as well as all the government offices, the fire station, library, and post office. The town's three churches were all flattened: the Congregational United Church of Christ, pastor Rev. Jann Cather Weaver, the Lutheran Church, pastor Rev. Robert Twiton, and the Roman Catholic Church. The Congregational UCC church also lost its parsonage. In all, about 170 of the village's 225 commercial, agricultural, and residential buildings were either destroyed instantly or damaged seriously enough that they were unable to be rebuilt. The only remaining and largely undamaged structure was the water tower, which had to be repaired and repainted. Damage to the village of Barneveld was estimated at $25 million with damage to the surrounding area put at about $40 million. Rebuilding began immediately, and by 2000, the population of Barneveld was almost exactly double what it was at the time the tornado nearly destroyed the town. The thunderstorm that created the tornado also put on one of the brightest lightning shows in recorded history, generating 200 strikes per minute.

== Images ==
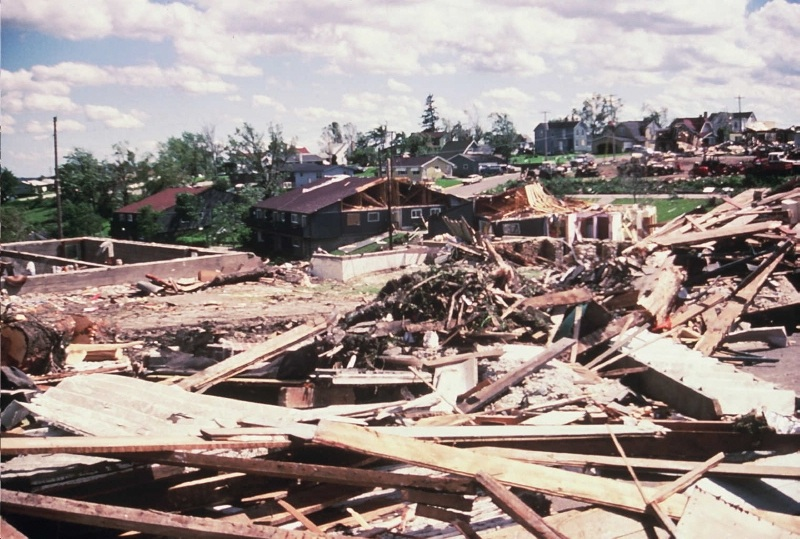
1984 tornado damage

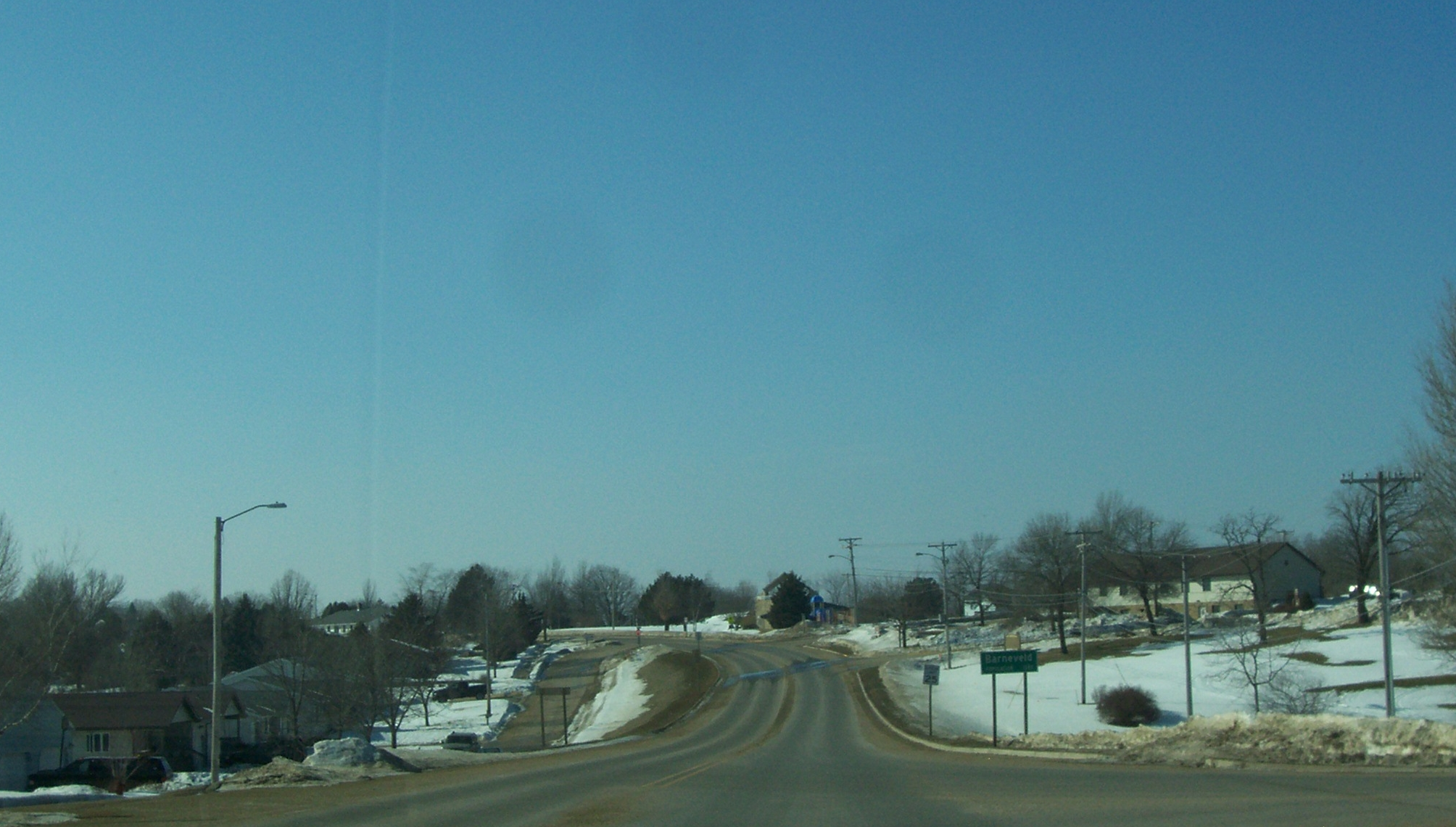
Looking west at Barneveld

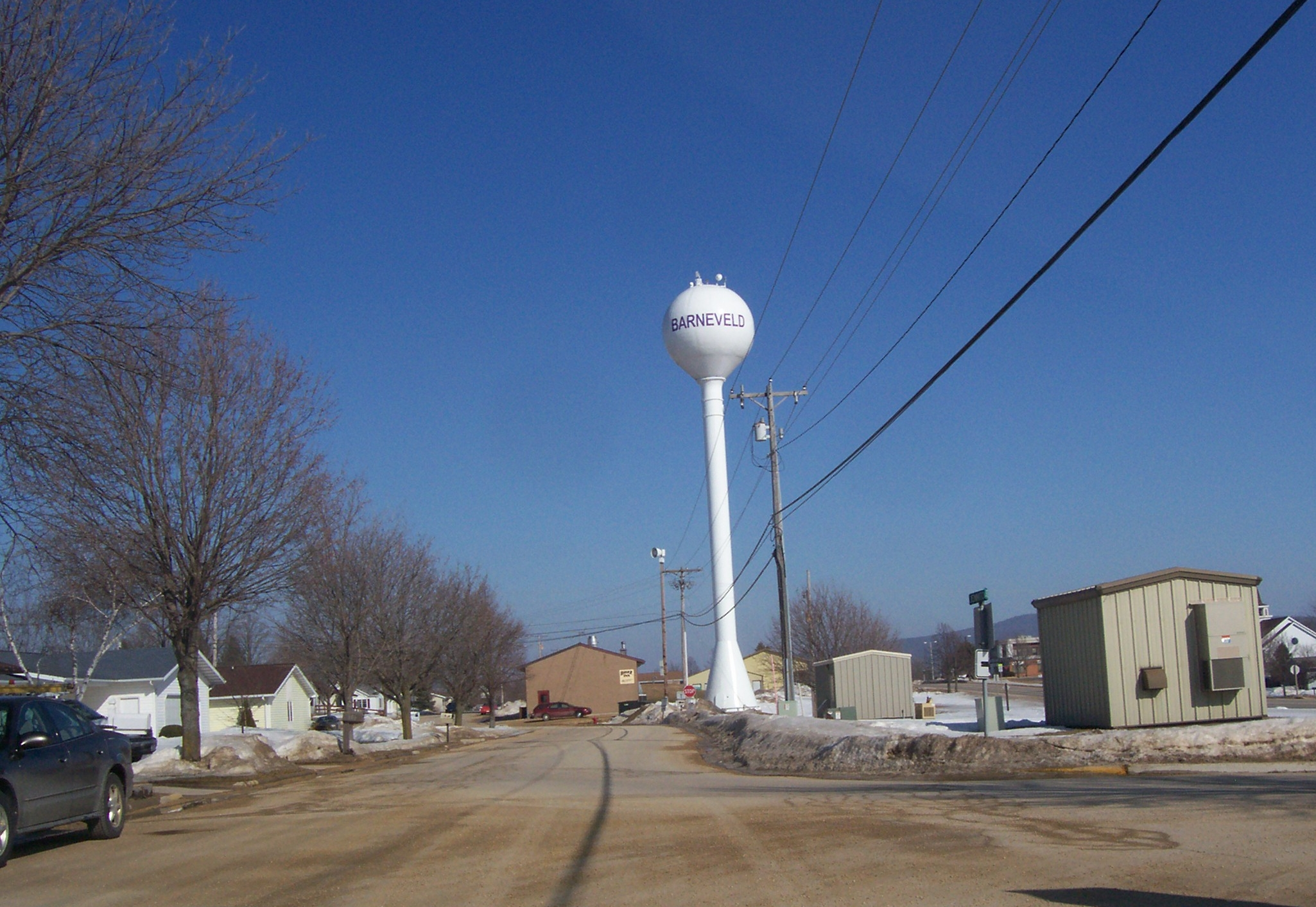
Looking east at houses and Barneveld's water tower

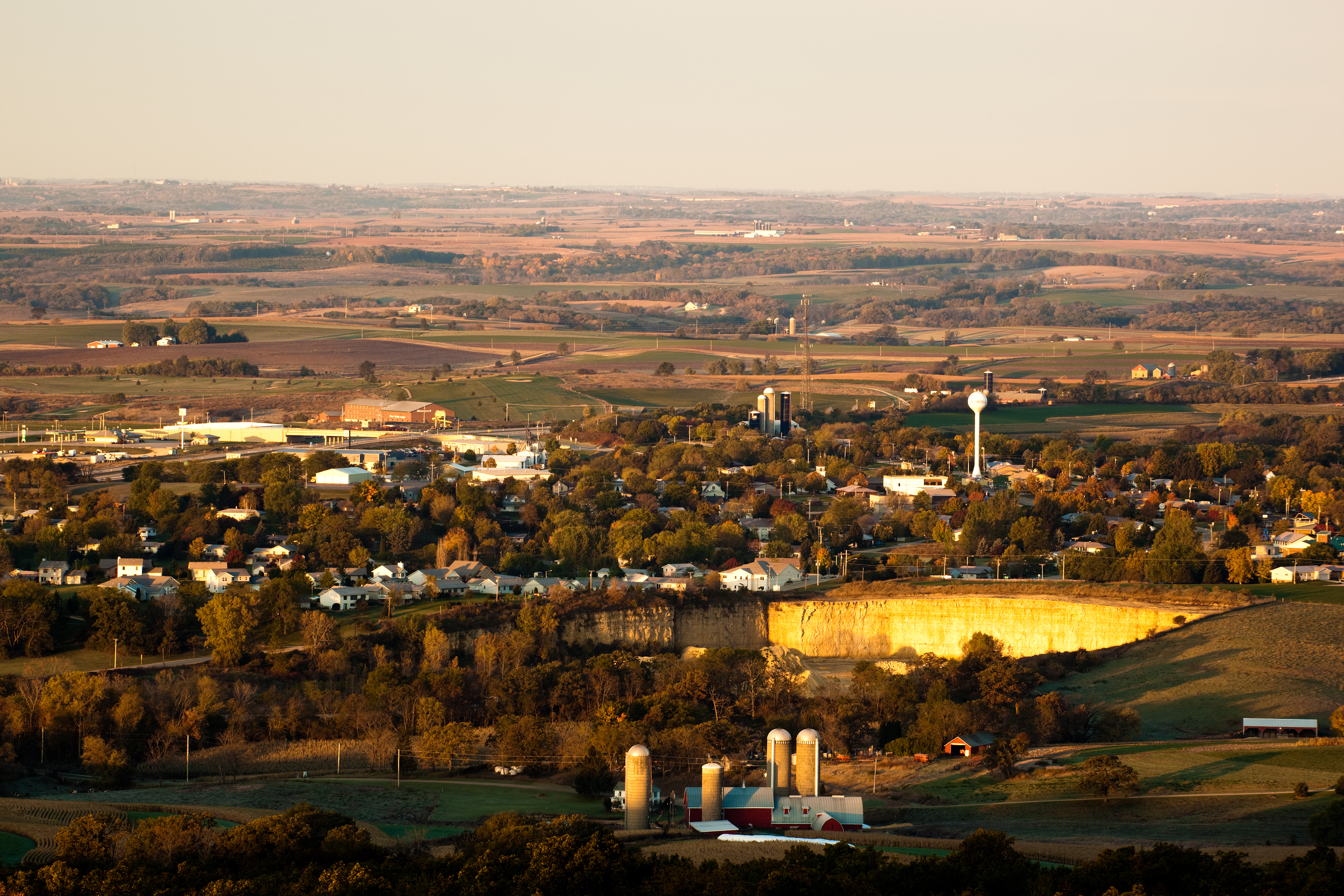
An aerial view from nearby Blue Mound State Park.

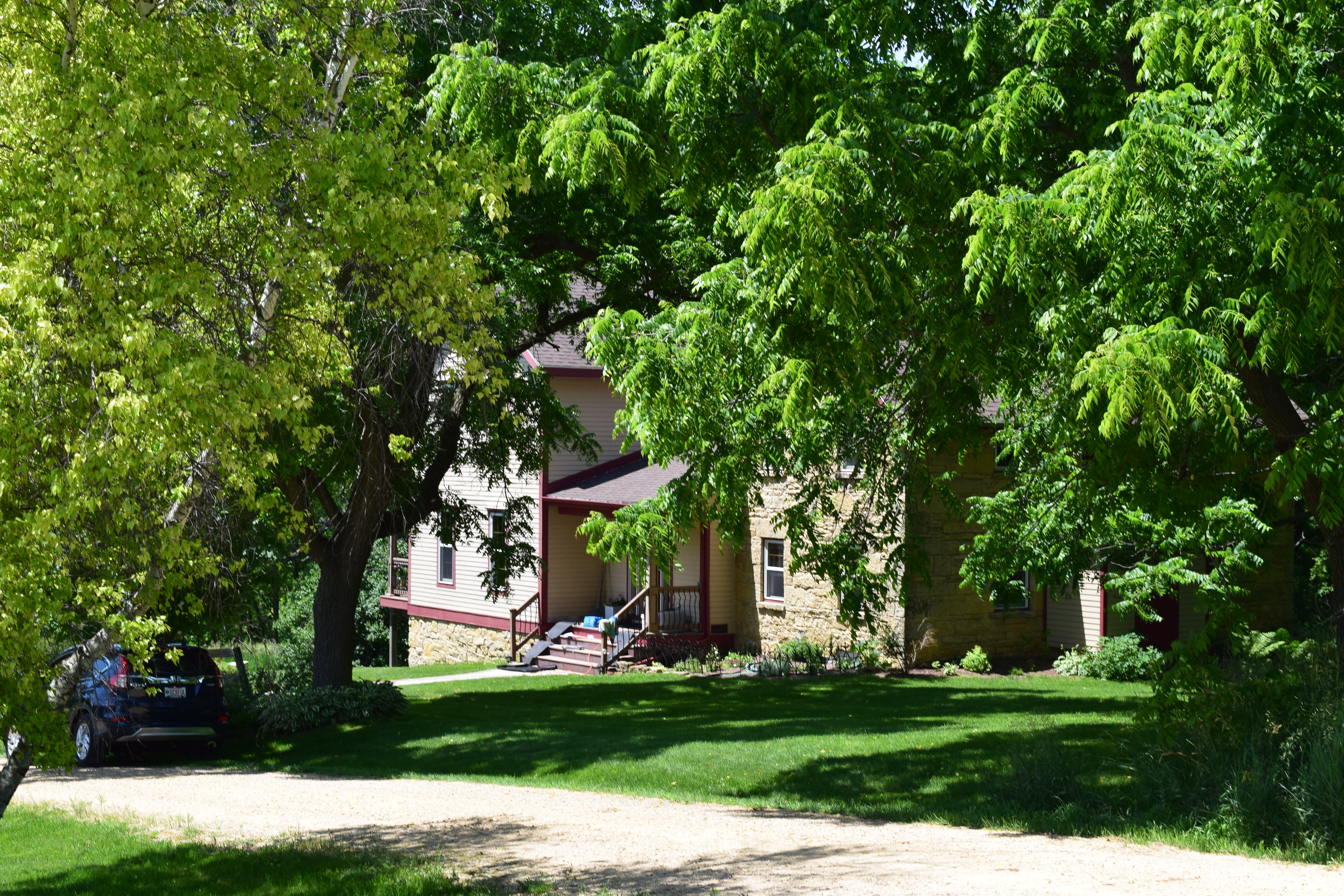
Cassidy Farmhouse

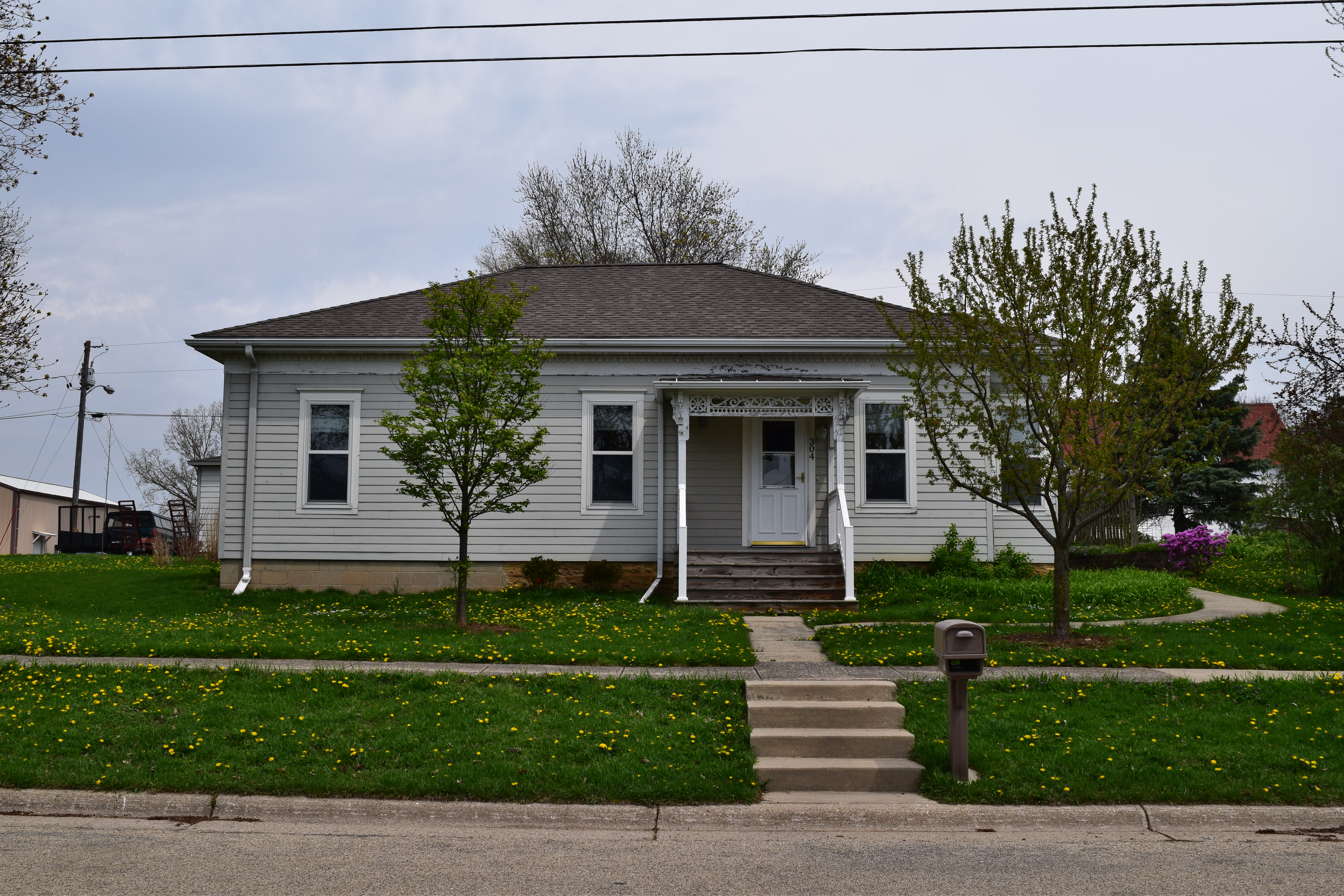
Osborn House, located within the Grove Street Historic District.

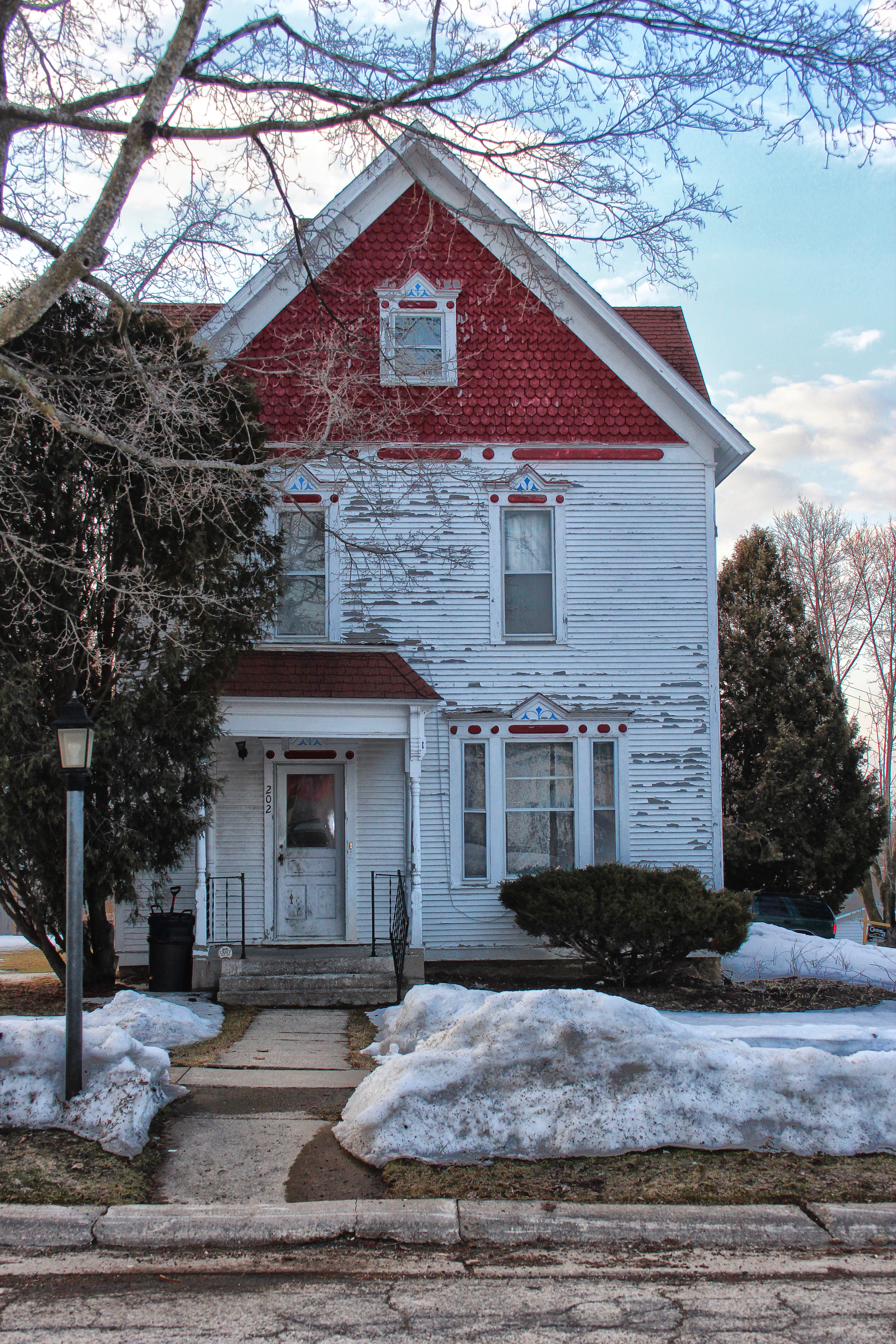
Harris House

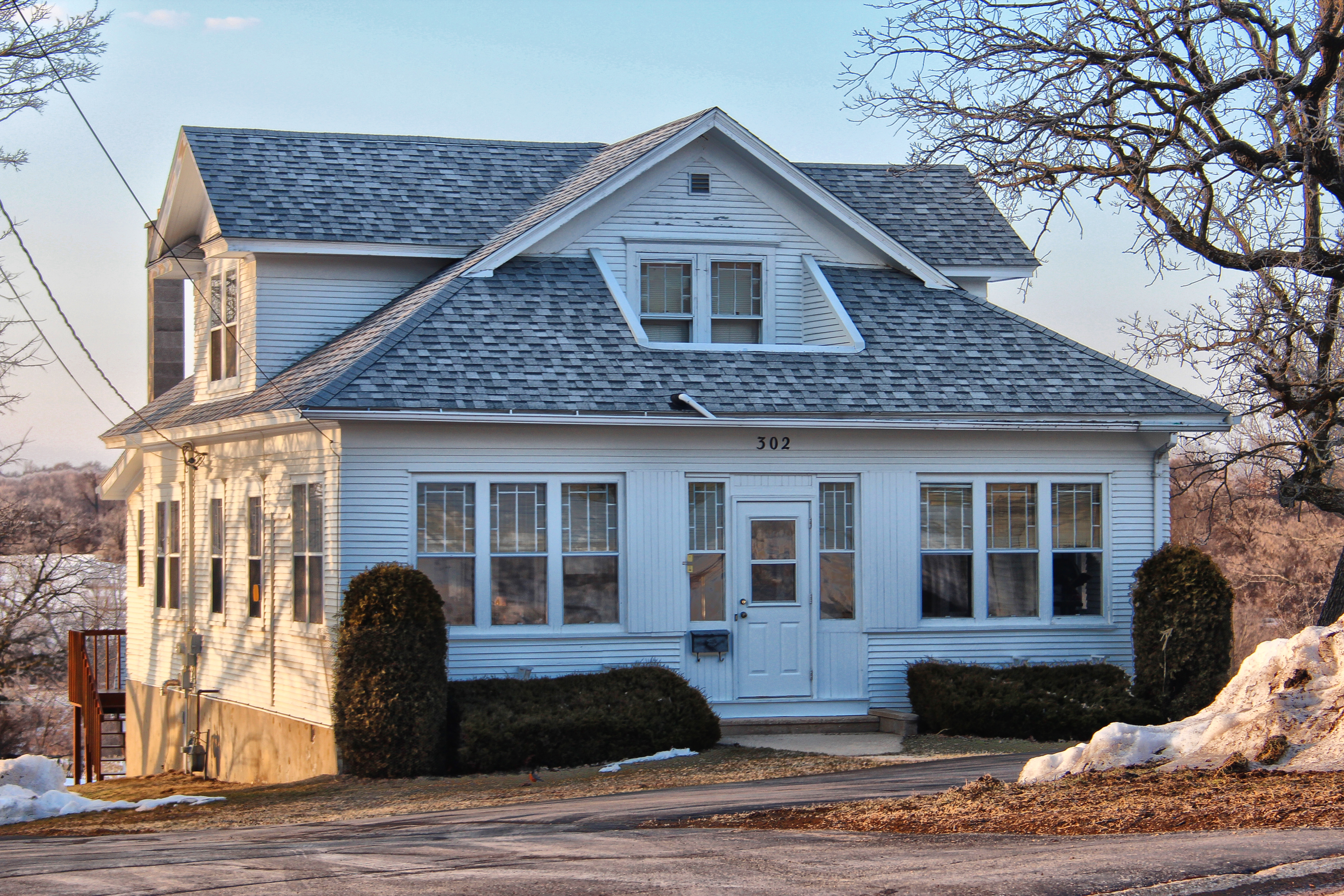
Roberts House
