= Pecatonica Wetlands Forest Preserve =

The Pecatonica Wetlands Forest Preserve is a 1,048-acre (4.24 km^{2}) park located on the Pecatonica River in western Winnebago County in the U.S. state of Illinois. The nearest municipality is the village of Pecatonica.

== Description ==
The Winnebago County Forest Preserve District describes Pecatonica Wetlands as a riverine land parcel of "flood-plain forest, oxbow pond marshes and upland forest." The Forest Preserve District has enhanced the land parcel with fishing access points, 8.0 miles (12.9 km) of hiking trails, picnic areas with 22 picnic tables, and a 200-seat shelterhouse for reserved meetings and family gatherings. A Forest Preserve District map shows that, in addition, the park has been enriched by tallgrass prairie restoration areas, a snowmobile trail for winter use, and public outhouses.

The Wetlands Forest Preserve does not offer overnight campsites, and officially closes 1/2 hour after sunset. The nearest limited-access public way is U.S. Highway 20. The address of the Forest Preserve, for geolocation purposes, is 5750 Best Road, Pecatonica IL 61063.
