= Grove Street Historic District (Barneveld, Wisconsin) =

Historic district in Wisconsin, United States

- U.S. National Register of Historic Places
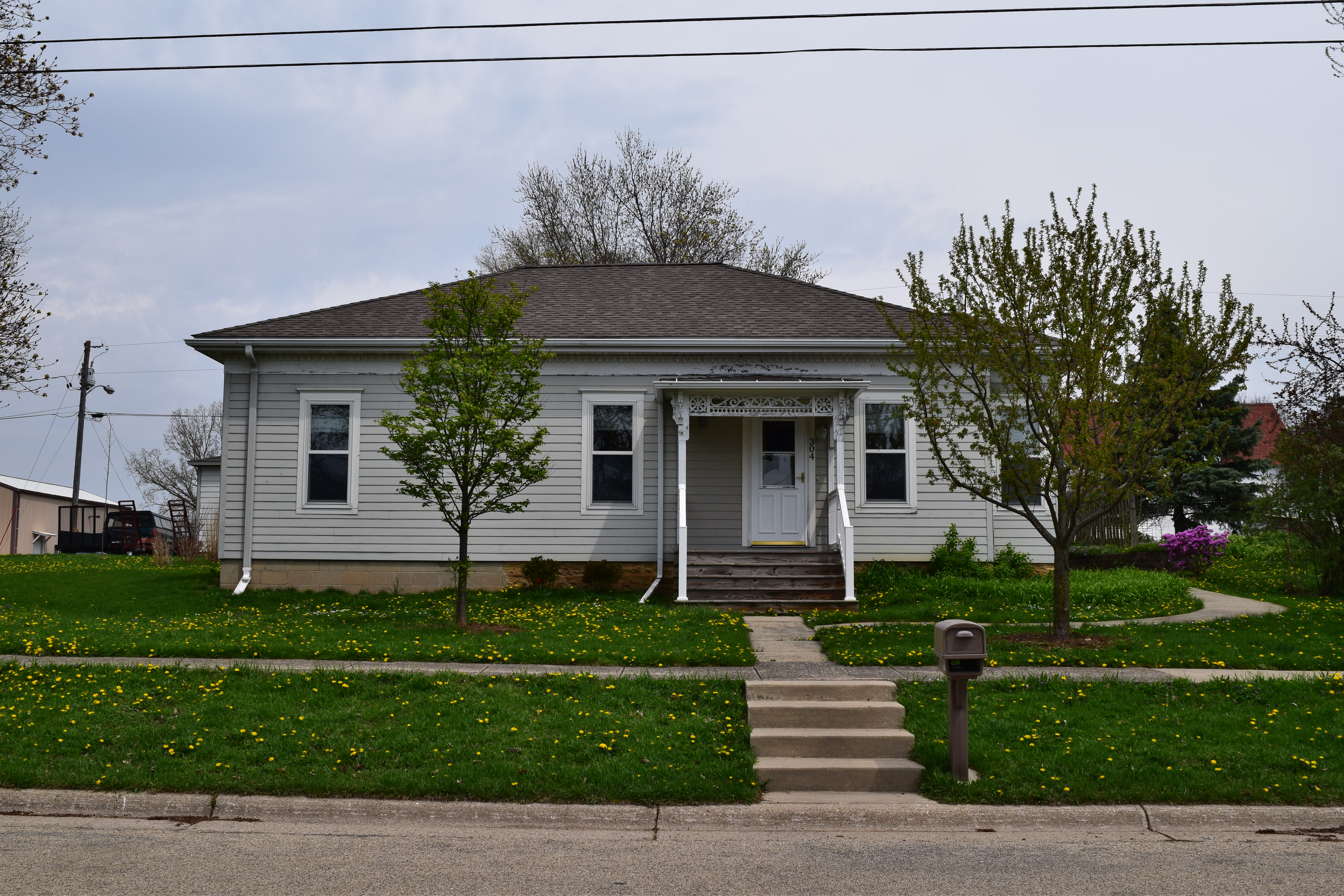
- A house located in the district.
- Location: 304-316 Grove St., Barneveld, Wisconsin
- Coordinates: 43°00′59″N 89°53′58″W
- Area: less than one acre
- MPS: Barneveld MRA
- NRHP reference No.: 86002313
- Added to NRHP: September 29, 1986

The Grove Street Historic District is a residential historic district in Barneveld, Wisconsin. The district encompasses six houses from 304 to 316 on the east side of Grove Street.

== History ==
The six houses in the district were all built in the first quarter of the twentieth century and are examples of the period's vernacular home styles. These styles include the front-gabled house, side-gabled house, gable and ell, and a single-story house with a hip roof. The houses are ornamented with period features such as bay windows, carved woodwork, and decorative shingles. Two local carpenters, Eric M. Hughes and John Lewis, built three of the homes in the district.

The district is one of the few locations in Barneveld left largely unchanged after the 1984 Barneveld, Wisconsin tornado outbreak. It was listed on the National Register of Historic Places in 1986 and on the State Register of Historic Places in 1989.
