= Harris House (Barneveld, Wisconsin) =

Historic house in Wisconsin, United States

- U.S. National Register of Historic Places
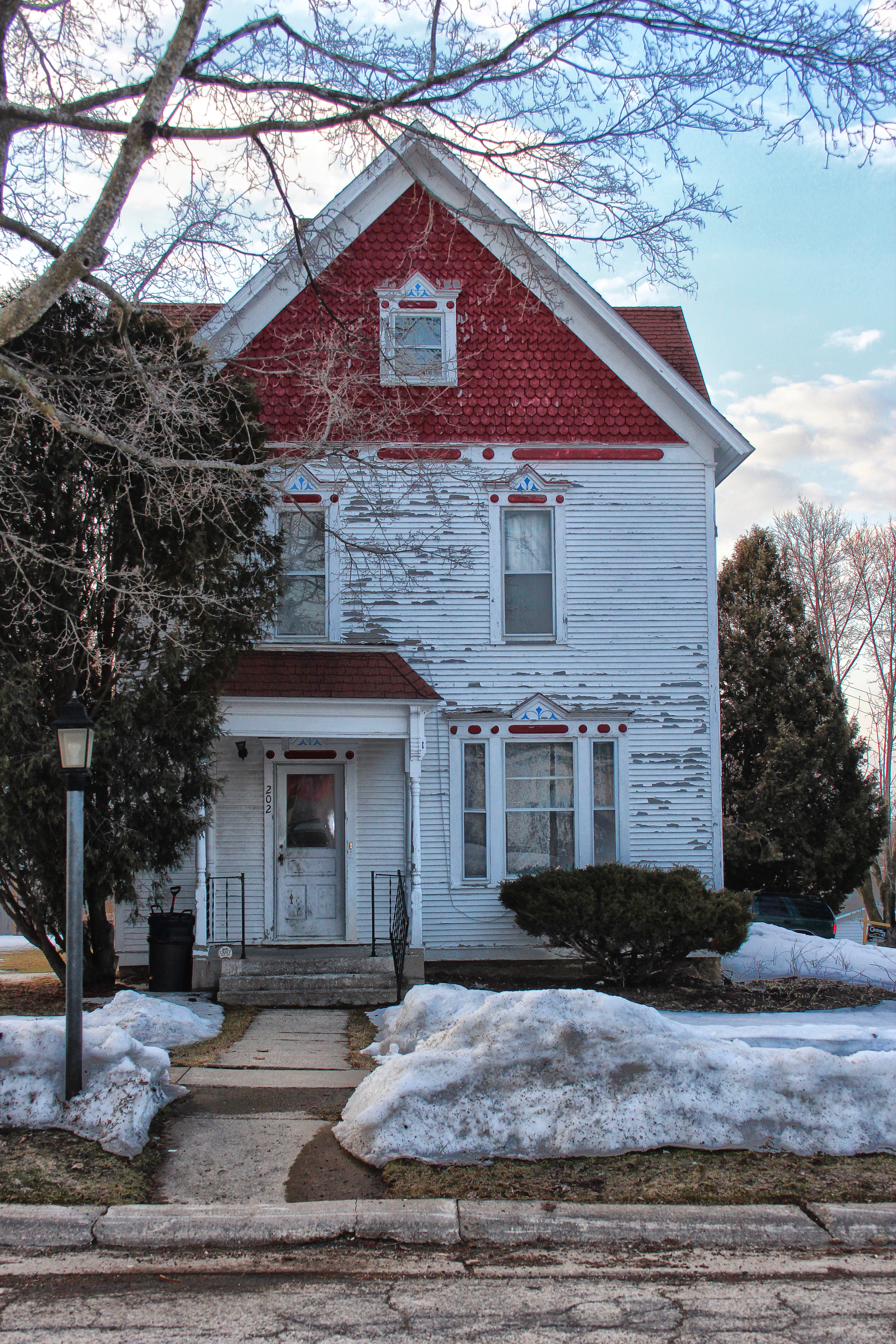
- Harris House
- Location: 202 W. Wood St., Barneveld, Wisconsin
- Coordinates: 43°00′57″N 89°53′54″W
- Area: less than one acre
- Built: c. 1890
- Architectural style: Queen Anne
- MPS: Barneveld MRA
- NRHP reference No.: 86002299
- Added to NRHP: September 29, 1986

The Harris House is a historic house located at 202 West Wood Street in Barneveld, Wisconsin.

== History ==
The two-story Queen Anne house was built by a local lumberman circa 1890. The house's design included carved lintels, double-hung windows with diamond muntins on the attic windows, and fishscale shingles within the ends of its gable roof. The upper story and attic were split in two to house visitors to a mineral spring, which at the time was planned for development into a spa resort. The spa was never built, and the house instead became a duplex. It is the largest house to survive the 1984 Barneveld tornado.

The house was listed on the National Register of Historic Places in 1986 and on the State Register of Historic Places in 1989.
