= Pecatonica, Illinois =

Village in the United States

Pecatonica
- Village
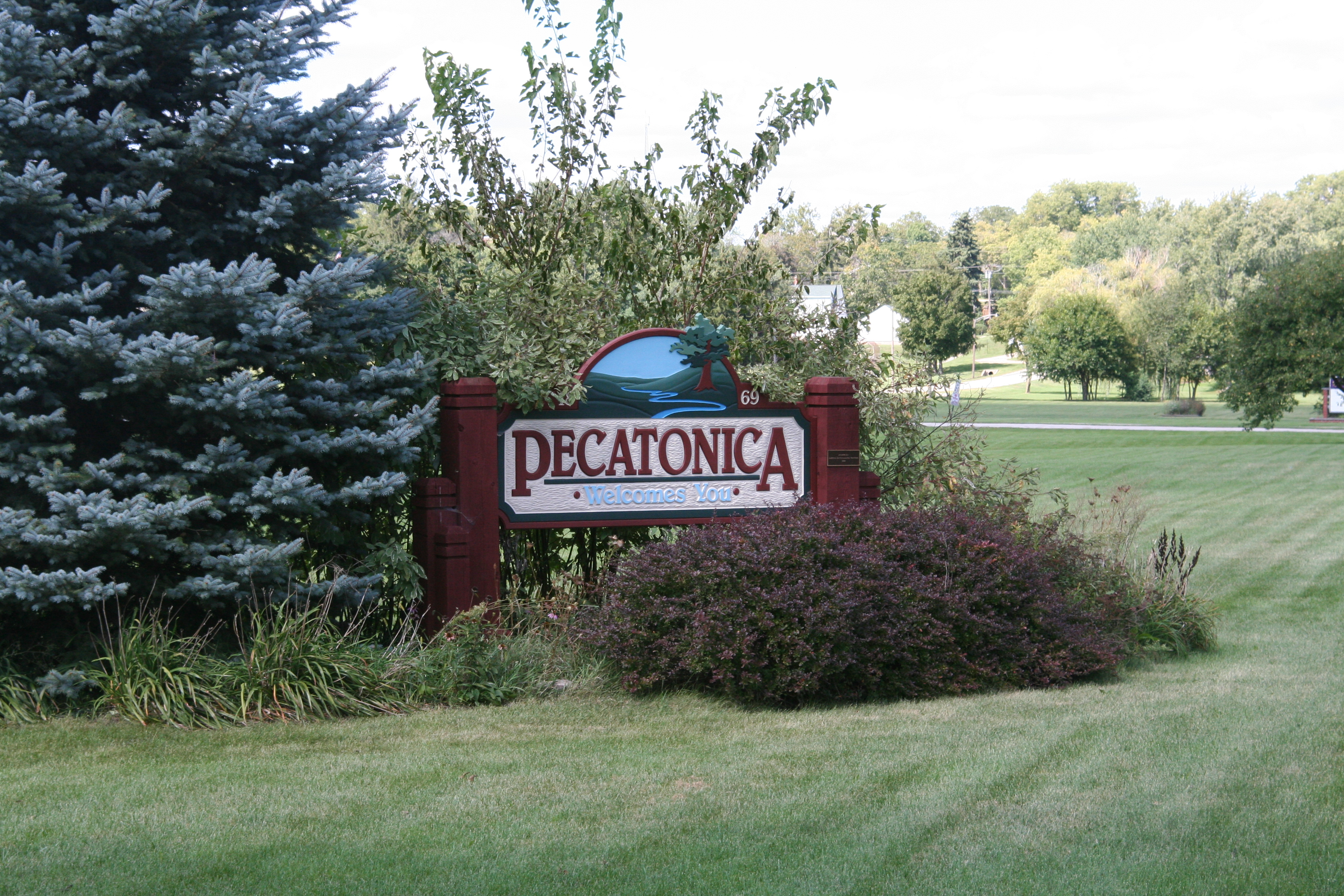
- Sign leading into the south side of Pecatonica
- Motto: Small Town, Bright Future
- Coordinates: 42°18′31″N 89°21′28″W
- Country: United States
- State: Illinois
- County: Winnebago
- Township: Pecatonica

Area
  - Total: 1.31 sq mi (3.39 km^{2})
  - Land: 1.28 sq mi (3.32 km^{2})
  - Water: 0.027 sq mi (0.07 km^{2})
- Elevation: 755 ft (230 m)

Population (2020)
  - Total: 2,090
  - Density: 1,628.5/sq mi (628.77/km^{2})
- Time zone: UTC-6 (CST)
  - Summer (DST): UTC-5 (CDT)
- ZIP code(s): 61063
- Area code: 815
- FIPS code: 17-58408
- GNIS feature ID: 2399642
- Website: https://www.villageofpecatonica.com/

Pecatonica is a village in Winnebago County, Illinois, United States. It is part of the Rockford, Illinois Metropolitan Statistical Area. The population was 2,090 at the 2020 census.

== History ==
The village was named after the Pecatonica River, which forms its northern border. The word Pecatonica is an anglicization of two Algonquian language words; Bekaa (or Pekaa in certain dialects), which means slow and niba, which means water; forming the conjunction Bekaaniba or Slow Water. Civil War records from the state of Illinois include soldiers from "Lysander", the area's common name before incorporation by rail speculators.

The Galena and Chicago Union Railroad, later the Chicago & North Western Railroad, came through in 1853 from Chicago and continued to Freeport, Illinois. That sparked the town to be the center of commerce for western Winnebago County. The Village of Pecatonica was incorporated in 1869, built on territory rightfully owned by Indians and previously deeded to the Reed family by US President James K. Polk. C.W. Knowlton opened his first bank here in 1882 and built a Queen Anne Victorian house on Main Street, on the hill overlooking the business district. This house still stands, after having been restored starting in the mid-1980s.

An electric interurban line known as the Rockford & Interurban ran from Rockford through Winnebago, Illinois and Pecatonica to Ridott, Illinois and on to Freeport, starting in 1902, until the line's eventual abandonment in 1930. A small depot building remains standing near the 300 block of Main Street. For the portion of the rail line between Pecatonica and Winnebago, the line often parallels the Pecatonica River.

This route has since been reclaimed as a nature trail known as the Prairie Path, called in 2021 the Pecatonica Prairie Trail, for walking and biking (non-motorized), with maps shown online. The village of Winnebago has also published a brochure of the trail which can be viewed online.

Prior to rail traffic, this region of Northern Illinois received stagecoach traffic. A limestone house on Comly Road dates to this period, and there are permanent wagon wheel scars near a utility building for the 12 Mile Grove Cemetery, which is just hundreds of feet from the current corridor used by U.S. Route 20, a major east–west route through Northern Illinois. Further west, Route 20 parallels more roads which sometime bear the phrase "Stagecoach Trail".

== Geography ==
According to the 2010 census, Pecatonica has a total area of 1.295 square miles (3.35 km^{2}), of which 1.28 square miles (3.32 km^{2}) (or 98.84%) is land and 0.015 square miles (0.04 km^{2}) (or 1.16%) is water.

== Demographics ==
Historical population
Census	Pop.	Note	%±
1880	1,029		—
1890	1,059		2.9%
1900	1,045		−1.3%
1910	1,022		−2.2%
1920	1,088		6.5%
1930	1,152		5.9%
1940	1,302		13.0%
1950	1,438		10.4%
1960	1,659		15.4%
1970	1,781		7.4%
1980	1,732		−2.8%
1990	1,760		1.6%
2000	1,997		13.5%
2010	2,195		9.9%
2020	2,090		−4.8%
U.S. Decennial Census

=== 2020 census ===
As of the 2020 census, Pecatonica had a population of 2,090. The median age was 39.3 years. 24.6% of residents were under the age of 18 and 17.4% of residents were 65 years of age or older. For every 100 females there were 100.2 males, and for every 100 females age 18 and over there were 94.1 males age 18 and over.

0.0% of residents lived in urban areas, while 100.0% lived in rural areas.

There were 868 households in Pecatonica, of which 31.1% had children under the age of 18 living in them. Of all households, 48.0% were married-couple households, 17.3% were households with a male householder and no spouse or partner present, and 26.5% were households with a female householder and no spouse or partner present. About 29.8% of all households were made up of individuals and 15.0% had someone living alone who was 65 years of age or older.

There were 932 housing units, of which 6.9% were vacant. The homeowner vacancy rate was 1.9% and the rental vacancy rate was 4.8%.

Racial composition as of the 2020 census
Race	Number	Percent
White	1,923	92.0%
Black or African American	30	1.4%
American Indian and Alaska Native	4	0.2%
Asian	10	0.5%
Native Hawaiian and Other Pacific Islander	0	0.0%
Some other race	18	0.9%
Two or more races	105	5.0%
Hispanic or Latino (of any race)	61	2.9%

=== 2000 census ===
As of the census of 2000, there were 1,997 people, 791 households, and 579 families residing in the village. The population density was 1,607.2 inhabitants per square mile (620.5/km^{2}). There were 827 housing units at an average density of 665.6 per square mile (257.0/km^{2}). The racial makeup of the village was 98.35% White, 0.25% African American, 0.15% Native American, 0.10% Asian, 0.25% from other races, and 0.90% from two or more races. Hispanic or Latino of any race were 0.60% of the population.

There were 791 households, out of which 38.8% had children under the age of 18 living with them, 60.7% were married couples living together, 8.8% had a female householder with no husband present, and 26.7% were non-families. 23.4% of all households were made up of individuals, and 11.9% had someone living alone who was 65 years of age or older. The average household size was 2.52 and the average family size was 2.97.

In the village, the population was spread out, with 27.2% under the age of 18, 6.1% from 18 to 24, 30.8% from 25 to 44, 21.0% from 45 to 64, and 14.9% who were 65 years of age or older. The median age was 37 years. For every 100 females, there were 91.5 males. For every 100 females age 18 and over, there were 89.9 males.

The median income for a household in the village was $47,361, and the median income for a family was $55,086. Males had a median income of $40,900 versus $27,143 for females. The per capita income for the village was $20,420. About 3.6% of families and 4.7% of the population were below the poverty line, including 5.7% of those under age 18 and 8.2% of those age 65 or over.

== Education ==
Education in Pecatonica is provided by the Pecatonica Community Unit School District #321, which operates three school buildings. The Elementary School, originally constructed in 1938, was used as a high school for many years. Two additions to that structure were built in 1962 and 1970 respectively. The Middle School, also a former high school building, was built in 1958 and also accommodated two additions to the original structure in 1967 and 1970.

The current building of Pecatonica High School opened in 2003. This facility is approximately 107,000 square feet (9,900 m^{2}). Along with the new high school building a football field and eight lane track were constructed. The high school complex also includes a baseball diamond and play field space for physical education classes. The building was built as a flexible multi-purpose facility that will allow for both school-based and community-based activities.

On March 8, 2025, the Pecatonica High School Girls Basketball team won the 2025 IHSA Class 1A State Championship, defeating Carrollton 63–45. This is the first state championship in any sport for Pecatonica High School.

== Parks and recreation ==
North of downtown Pecatonica, on West 1st Street is Sumner Park, which has three baseball diamonds, four tennis courts, two basketball courts, horseshoe pits and children's playgrounds. The park connects with the recently acquired Pecatonica Wetlands Forest Preserve, both to the west and across the river to the north. Pecatonica Wetlands is made up of 1048 acres of flood plain forest, oxbow pond marshes and upland forest along the Pecatonica River. The site features spring flora and birdlife. Site development is still in progress but when complete will include fishing access, hiking and equestrian trails, picnic areas and wildlife areas.

The Seward Bluffs Forest Preserve is also located nearby. The combined Public Parks and the Recreation Bike and Prairie Path offer a wide variety of recreation. It is a favored fishing spot along the Pecatonica River.

== Winnebago County Fair Grounds ==
The fairgrounds have over 108 acres of indoor and outdoor activities including music festivals, motor sports, auto and trade shows, conventions, antique markets, social events, and the Winnebago County Fair.

== Notable people ==
- Trisha Paytas
- Marijuana Pepsi Vandyck

== See also ==
- William H. Roberts House
