= Cassidy Farmhouse =

Historic house in Wisconsin, United States

- U.S. National Register of Historic Places
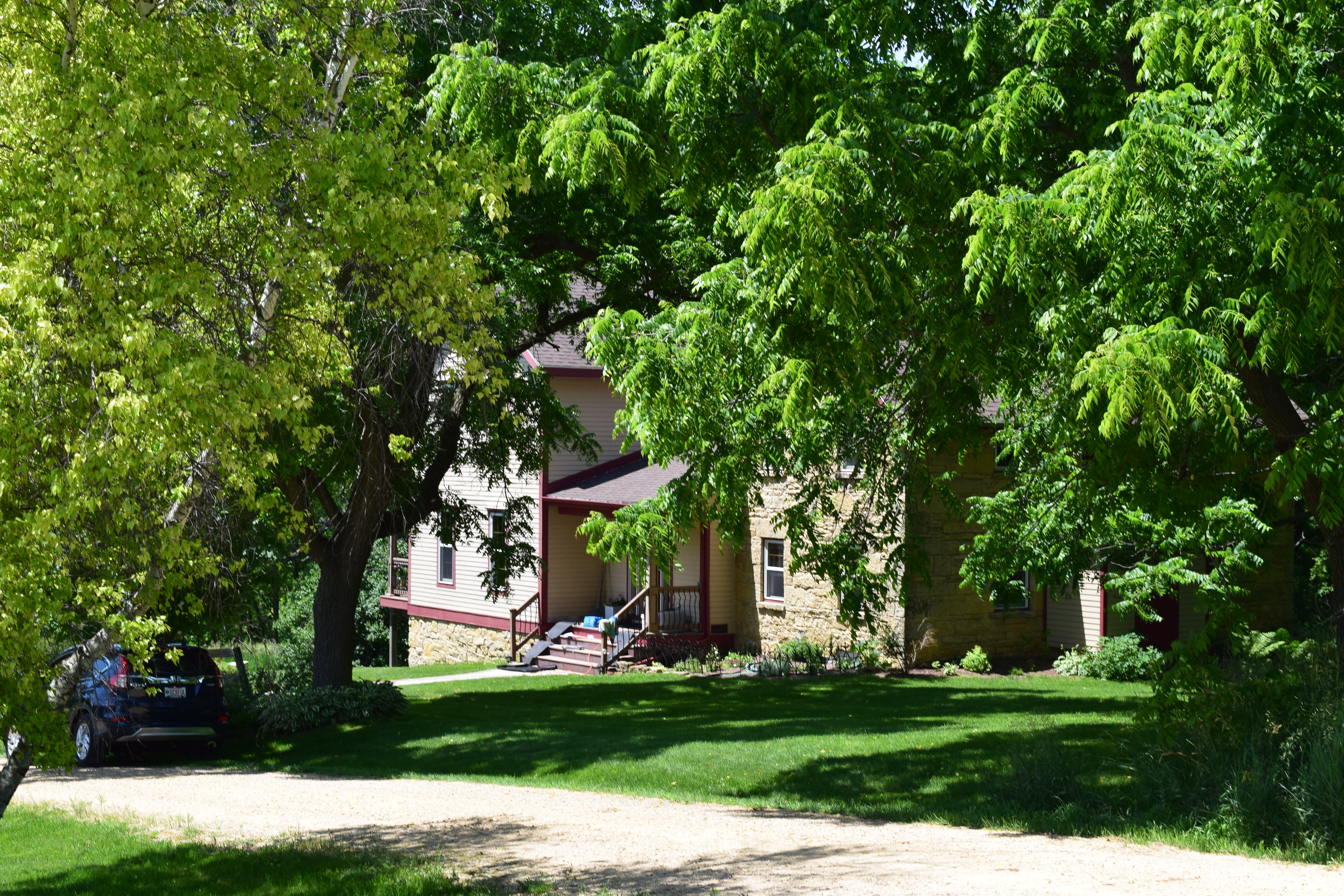
- Cassidy Farmhouse
- Location: Off WI K N of US 18/151, Barneveld, Wisconsin
- Coordinates: 43°01′26″N 89°53′23″W
- Area: 5 acres (2.0 ha)
- Built: 1860
- Architectural style: Greek Revival
- MPS: Barneveld MRA
- NRHP reference No.: 86002297
- Added to NRHP: September 29, 1986

The Cassidy Farmhouse is a historic farmhouse located in Barneveld, Wisconsin, along County Highway K in the north of the village. The Greek Revival house was built circa 1860, making it the oldest extant building in Barneveld. The two-story house was built with local limestone, making it unique among Barneveld's homes.

== History ==
Henry and Sarah Cassidy, the house's owners, were among the earliest settlers of Barneveld. The couple purchased the house's plot in 1850 and built the house by 1860. The property remained in the Cassidy family until 1945. The house was listed on the National Register of Historic Places in 1986 and on the State Register of Historic Places in 1989.
