= Marijuana Pepsi Vandyck =

American educator (born 1972)

- Born: Marijuana Pepsi Jackson; 1972 (age 53–54); Chicago, Illinois, U.S.
- Education: University of Wisconsin–Whitewater (BS); Georgia Southern University (MEd); Cardinal Stritch University (PhD)
- Occupation: Educator
- Years active: 1994 – present
- Employer: Beloit College
- Known for: Sociological study of uncommon Black names in the classroom, Her name
- Spouse(s): Sawyer (div) Fredrick Vandyck (m. 2017)
- Children: 4 including 3 stepchildren
- Parent(s): Maggie and Aaron Jackson

Marijuana Pepsi Vandyck (née Jackson, born 1972) is an American educational professional. Vandyck earned a Ph.D. from Cardinal Stritch University in 2019 with a dissertation on uncommon Black names in the classroom.

== Early life and name ==
Marijuana Pepsi Jackson was born in 1972 to Aaron and Maggie (Brandy) Jackson, who chose her name. She lived in Chicago, Illinois, until she was nine years old; then she moved to Beloit, Wisconsin, to live with her mother after her parents separated. She has two sisters, Kimberly and Robin. She first realized her name was unusual at age nine.

She said her mother told her "your name will take you around the world", and that her mother insisted on correcting a school spelling bee award certificate that read "Mary Jackson". She described being bullied in high school over her name, crediting her family with helping her learn to embrace the name. Despite her name, she said that she does not smoke marijuana nor drink Pepsi and chose to keep her name as an example of overcoming stereotyping.

She moved out of her mother's house at age fifteen, staying with friends and focusing on school. She graduated from Beloit Memorial High School in 1990 and received a scholarship for college at the University of Wisconsin–Whitewater. She majored in education and became a teacher after graduation.

While she was teaching elementary school in Atlanta, she studied for a masters degree at Georgia Southern University, then returned to Beloit with her young son from her first marriage. Marijuana companies constantly ask to work with her, but she always refuses unless it is for educational purposes.

== Education ==
Vandyck earned a bachelor's degree from the University of Wisconsin–Whitewater. After two semesters and a summer, she earned a master's degree from Georgia Southern University, before earning a Ph.D. in leadership for the advancement of learning and service in higher education from Cardinal Stritch University in May 2019. Her dissertation, titled "Black Names in White Classrooms: Teacher Behaviors and Student Perceptions", was inspired by prejudice she saw while working as a teacher. A co-worker had complained that her upcoming class would do poorly, based on the list of students with mostly "black-sounding" names.

== Career ==
Having previously worked as a teacher, Vandyck directs a program for first-generation, disabled and low-income students at Beloit College, in addition to owning a performance-coaching agency.

In the fall of 2019, Vandyck sponsored the Marijuana Pepsi Scholarship for first-generation African-American students at UW–Whitewater.

== Personal life ==
Vandyck was previously married to a Mr. Sawyer. The couple lived in Atlanta and had a son in the early 2000s. Their marriage ended in divorce and Vandyck returned to her hometown of Beloit, Wisconsin.

As of 2019, Vandyck was married to Fredrick Vandyck and living on a 3-acre (1.2 ha) farm in Pecatonica, Illinois, with her son and his three children from a previous relationship.
