= Pecatonica River =

River in Wisconsin and Illinois, USA

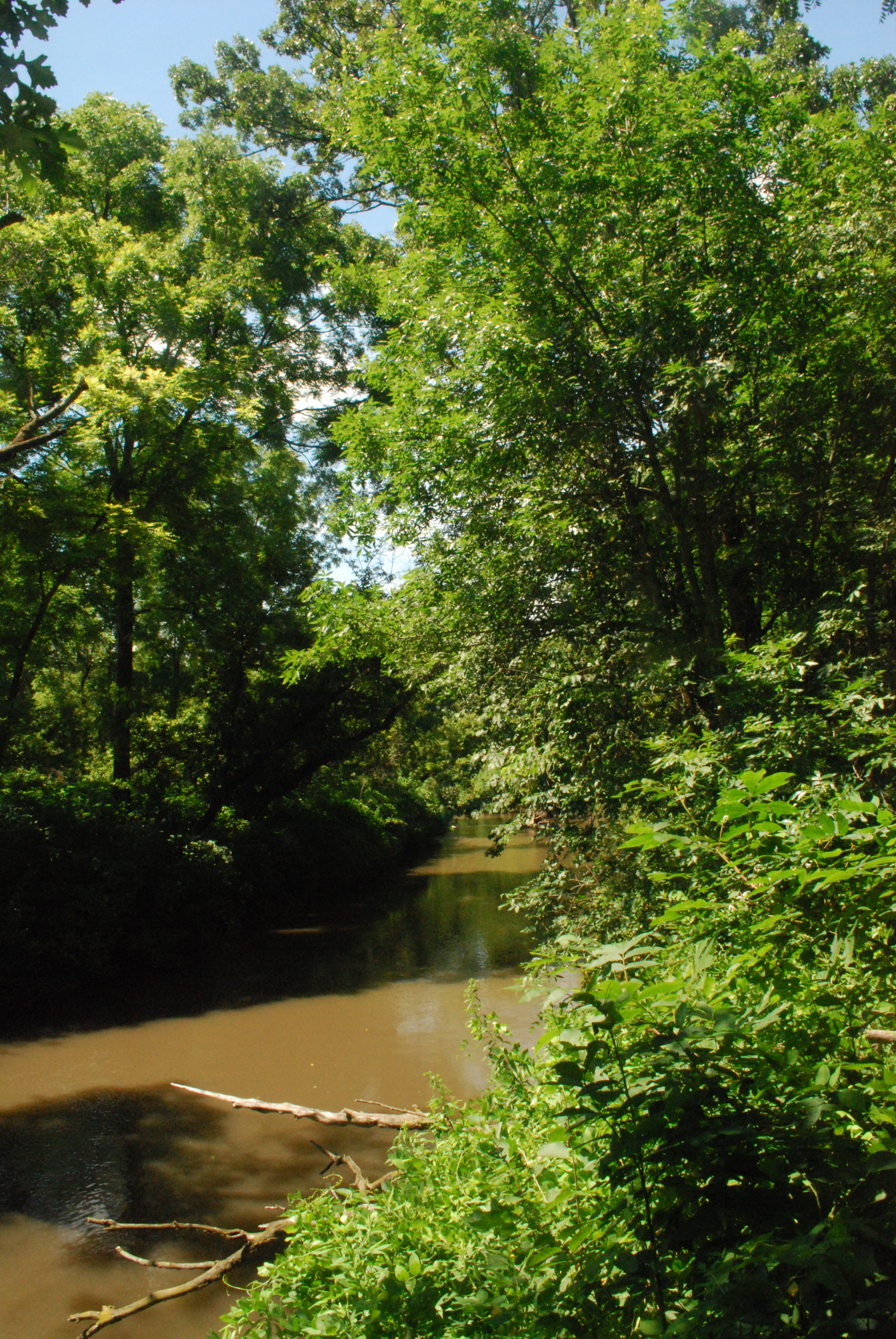
- The Pecatonica River in the Pecatonica River Woods State Natural Area in Iowa County, Wisconsin

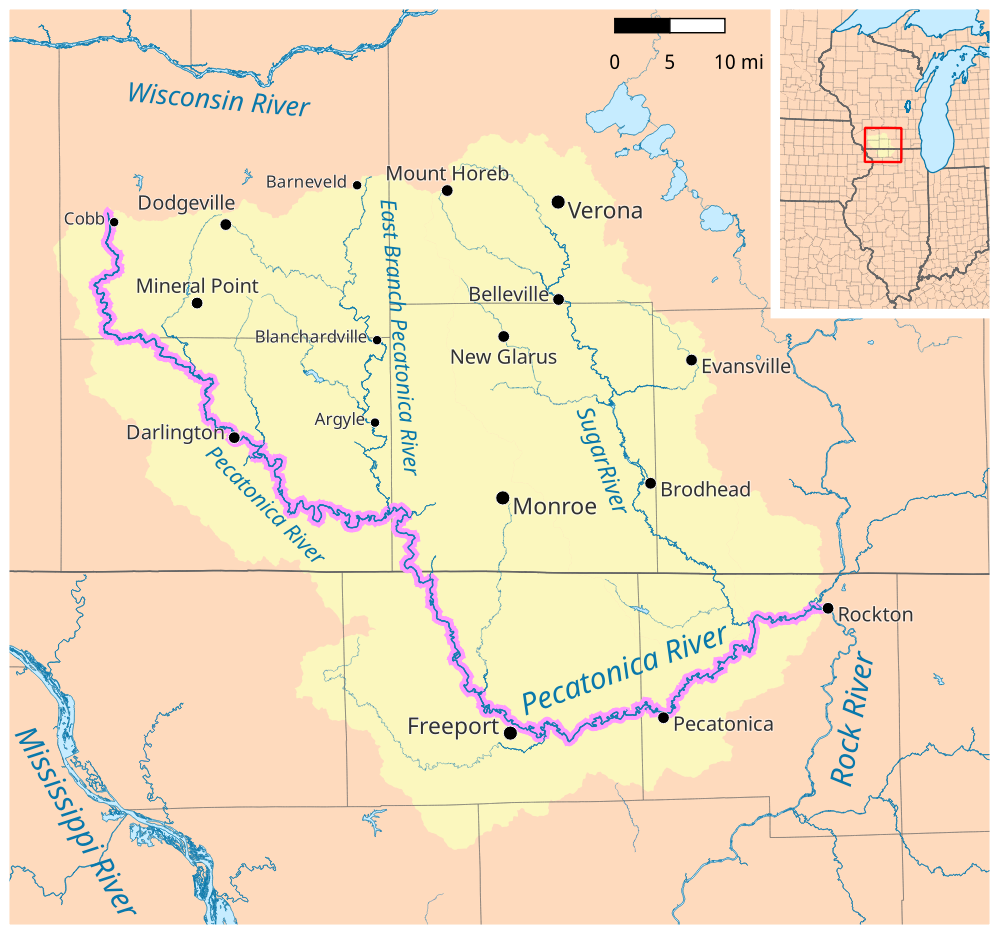
- Map of the Pecatonica River watershed

Physical characteristics
- Source
  - location: Iowa County northwest of Cobb, Wisconsin
  - coordinates: 42°58′44″N 90°20′37″W
  - elevation: 1,188 ft (362 m)
- Mouth
  - location: Confluence with the Rock River at Rockton, Illinois
  - coordinates: 42°27′00″N 89°04′30″W
  - elevation: 712 ft (217 m)
- Length: 194 mi (312 km)
- Discharge
  - location: Shirland, Illinois
  - average: 2,011 cu/ft. per sec.

Basin features
- Progression: Pecatonica River → Rock → Mississippi → Gulf of Mexico
- GNIS ID: 415503

The Pecatonica River is a tributary of the Rock River, 194 miles (312 km) long, in southern Wisconsin and northern Illinois in the United States.

The word Pecatonica is an anglicization of two Algonquian language words: Bekaa (or Pekaa in some dialects), which means "slow", and niba, which means "water", forming the conjunction Bekaaniba or "Slow Water".

It rises in the hills of southwest Wisconsin, in southwest Iowa County, 2 miles (3 km) west of Cobb. It flows south, then southeast, past Calamine and Darlington. In southeast Lafayette County it receives the East Branch Pecatonica River, approximately 8 miles (13 km) north of the state line. It flows south-southeast into Illinois, past Freeport, where it turns east, then east-northeast, receiving the Sugar River near Shirland in northern Winnebago County, 5 miles (8 km) south of the state line. It joins the Rock at Rockton, approximately 15 miles (24 km) north of Rockford.

== Illinois parks and preserves ==
The Winnebago County Forest Preserve District owns and operates six preserve along the river in Winnebago County. The river is the chief attraction of the 1,048-acre (424 ha) Pecatonica Wetlands Forest Preserve and the 221-acre (89 ha) Crooked River Forest Preserve off U.S. Highway 20 near Pecatonica, Illinois. These forest preserves contain oxbow lakes, wetlands, and bottomland forest. The river also flows past the 466-acre (189 ha) Pecatonica River Forest Preserve off Illinois Route 70 near Pecatonica. The forest preserve contains a bottomland forest and has been designated an Illinois Nature Preserve. The 15-acre (6.1 ha) Trask Bridge Forest Preserve and the 6-acre (2.4 ha) Two Rivers Forest Preserve at the confluence of the Sugar River and Pecatonica River provide public boat launches, picnic areas, and fishing opportunities. At the mouth of the Pecatonica is the 281-acre (114 ha) Macktown Forest Preserve on Illinois Route 75 near Rockton, the site of the ghost town of Macktown or Pe-Katonic.

The Natural Land Institute of Rockford, Illinois, owns and operates two privately owned preserves in Winnebago County. The 142-acre (57 ha) Pecatonica Woodlands Preserve contains bottomland forest, oxbow, wetland, and sedge meadow habitats. The 721-acre (292 ha) Nygren Wetland Preserve, located at the confluence of the Pecatonica River and the Rock River, has been restored from farmland to prairie, oak savanna, wetland, and oxbow pond.

== Wisconsin parks and preserves ==
The river is the focus of the 110-acre (45 ha) Pecatonica River Woods State Natural Area near Mineral Point in Iowa County, owned by the Wisconsin Department of Natural Resources and designated as a natural area in 1992. The Pecatonica River Woods SNA was listed on the basis of possessing a diverse range of forest ecosystems, from southern dry, through mesic, to floodplain. The 52-acre (21 ha) Weir White Oaks State Natural Area, a privately owned preserve managed by the Wisconsin DNR, contains high-quality old-growth upland forest and was designated a state natural area in 2002.

The 120-acre (49 ha) Blackhawk Memorial Park is owned and operated by Lafayette County.

== Flooding ==
The Pecatonica River has flooded seven times since May 2017. Flood cleanup cost the city of Freeport, Illinois, more than $1.5 million. The March 2019 flood crest of 22.4 feet (6.8 m) at Martintown, Wisconsin set a new record. The Pecatonica River flooded again in October 2019, along with other Chicago area rivers including the Fox River and the Rock River.

A USGS monitoring station is located at Freeport.

== See also ==
- List of Illinois rivers
- List of Wisconsin rivers
