= Giboney-Robertson-Stewart House =

Historic house in Arkansas, United States

- U.S. National Register of Historic Places
- U.S. Historic district – Contributing property
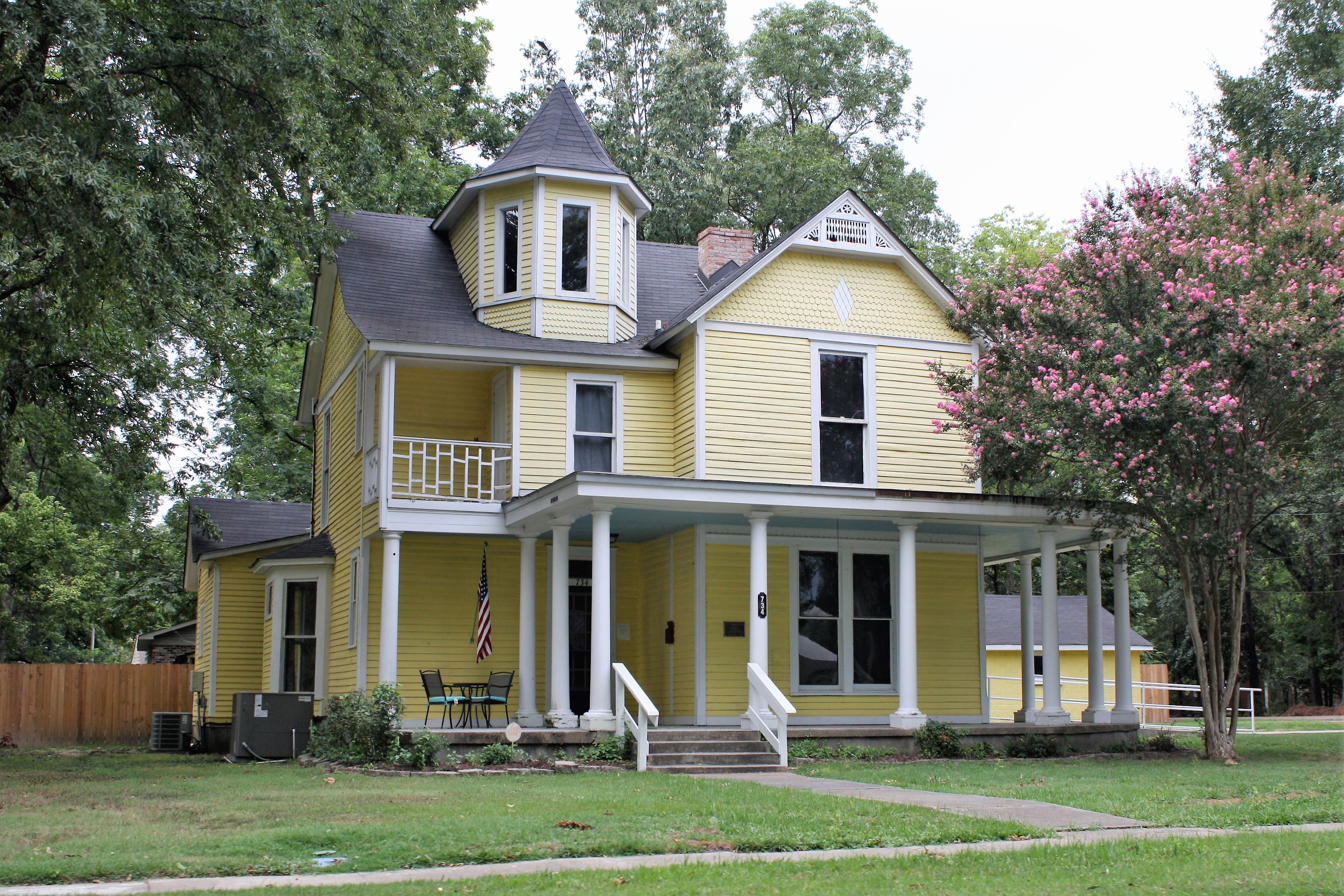

- Location within Arkansas Location within the United States
- Location: 734 Hamilton Ave., Wynne, Arkansas
- Coordinates: 35°13′32″N 90°47′5″W
- Area: less than one acre
- Built: 1895
- Architectural style: Queen Anne
- Part of: East Hamilton Avenue Historic District (ID11000330)
- NRHP reference No.: 98000585

Significant dates
- Added to NRHP: June 5, 1998
- Designated CP: June 8, 2011

The Giboney-Robertson-Stewart House is a historic house at 734 Hamilton Avenue in Wynne, Arkansas. It is a two-story wood-frame structure with a cross-gable roof, erected in 1895 for W. A. and Ann Giboney. It is one of the city's finest Queen Anne Victorians, and the only one two stories in height. It has the irregular massing typical of the style, and a wraparound one-story porch supported by Tuscan columns. Originally erected with a turret, that feature was removed sometime before the 1940s. The house has been owned by members of the locally prominent Robertson family, who were judges and lawyers, and by Doctor T. J. Stewart, one of the area's first medical practitioners.

The house was listed on the National Register of Historic Places in 1998.

== See also ==
- National Register of Historic Places listings in Cross County, Arkansas
