= William H. Roberts House =

Historic house in Illinois, United States

- U.S. National Register of Historic Places
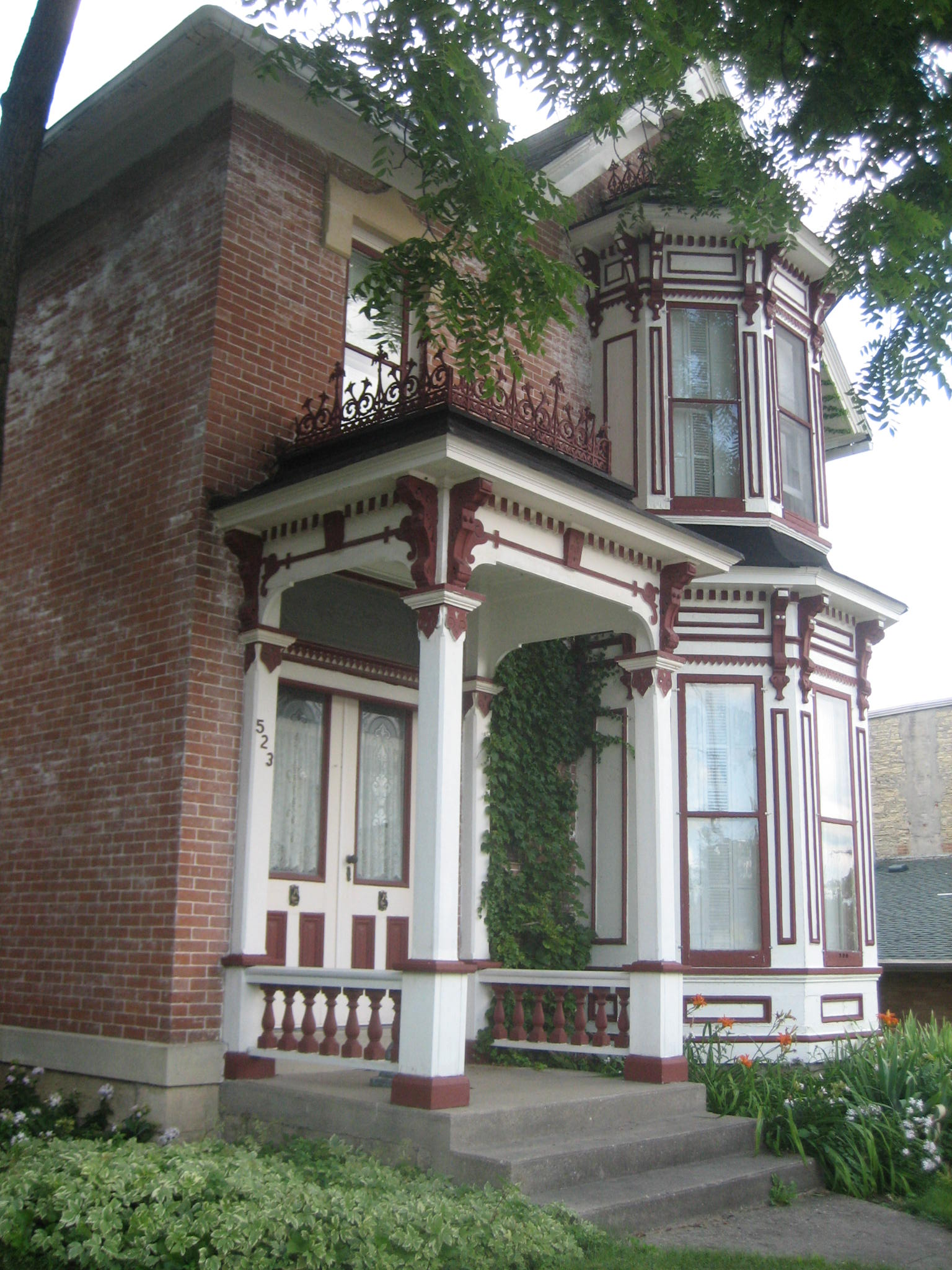

- Location within Illinois Location within the United States
- Location: 523 Main St., Pecatonica, Illinois
- Coordinates: 42°18′45″N 89°21′33″W
- Area: less than one acre
- Built: 1883
- Architect: Winchester, John; Hebard, Henry
- Architectural style: Italianate, Queen Anne, Gothic Revival
- NRHP reference No.: 79000877
- Added to NRHP: September 6, 1979

The William H. Roberts House is a late 19th-century house located in Pecatonica, Illinois, United States. The house was built in 1883 for Dr. William H. Roberts, who died three years later at the age of 33. The building features a combination of elements from three distinct architectural styles, Italianate, Queen Anne and Gothic revival. The building functioned as both Roberts's house and office. The house is the only building in Pecatonica listed on the United States National Register of Historic Places, a status it attained in 1979.

== History ==
The William H. Roberts House was built in 1883 for Dr. William H. Roberts of Pecatonica for a cost of US$3,240. At the time, it was considered one of the finest homes in Pecatonica. The house is located on Main Street, on the edge of Pecatonica's downtown. The location made Roberts accessible to the townspeople and connected his work life as a physician and surgeon with the larger community in Pecatonica. Roberts died at age 33 on June 23, 1886, following an illness; when he died he had many friends and was respected within the village of Pecatonica.

== Architecture ==
The two story house was built in three sections, front, center and rear. The front section is clad in Indiana pressed brick while the other two sections are clad in simple common brick. The window and door trim is done in Joliet stone. The Roberts House was constructed as architectural styles in the United States were changing. The Italianate and Gothic revival that had dominated architecture was going out of fashion and Queen Anne was becoming the widely accepted popular style. The William H. Roberts House displays elements from all three styles including the influence of the Queen Anne derivative Eastlake style.

The front facade has with a double front door on its left. The door and transom feature etched frosted glass and are surrounded by an ornamented porch. Along the center line of the structure are two oriel type bay windows, one each on the first and second floors. To the right is a second entrance, inset from the facade, designed to mimic the main entryway but with smaller proportions. The inset entrance was used as the door for Roberts' doctor's office.

Essentially, the house is cast in the Italianate style. Its oriel roofs and their bracketed eaves, the asymmetrical arrangement of lines and geometric shapes on bay windows and porches, and the port hole attic window are all indicative of Italianate style. Gothic revival elements originally included both the Joliet stone trimming and the medieval spears attached to each of the three vergeboard peaks. The spears have since been removed.

The Queen Anne elements on the house, influenced by the Eastlake principles, include: the ornamental iron fences, geometric squares and scrollwork, the etched and frosted glass on the main entrance, incised flowers on the porch and bay windows and the spindles lining the porch rails. In particular the ornamental iron fence work shows Eastlake influence in its medieval design.

== Significance ==
The William H. Roberts House is the only home identified in Pecatonica from the 1880s period; before 1900, the number of finer homes built in the village were minimal. The 1974 Illinois Historic Sites Survey cited the home for its significance in the area of architecture, calling it a "substantial Italianate residence." The Roberts House was listed on the United States National Register of Historic Places on September 6, 1979, and is currently the only property in Pecatonica included on the list.
