= Edward C. Roberts House =

Historic house in Iowa, United States

- U.S. National Register of Historic Places
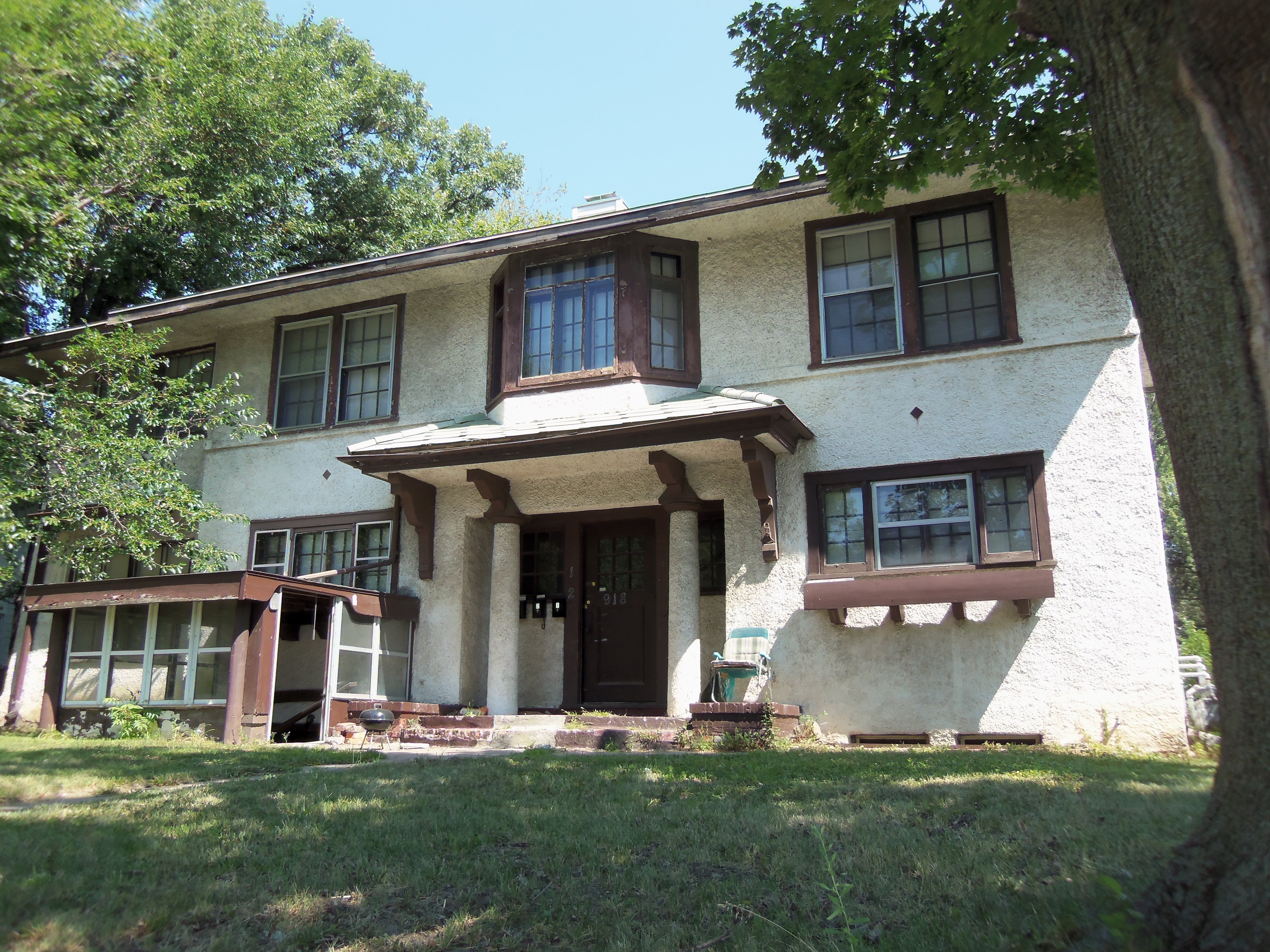

- Location within Iowa Location within the United States
- Interactive map showing the location of Edward C. Roberts House
- Location: 918 E. Locust St. Davenport, Iowa
- Coordinates: 41°32′18″N 90°33′42″W
- Area: less than one acre
- Built: 1909
- Architectural style: Prairie School
- MPS: Davenport MRA
- NRHP reference No.: 84001533
- Added to NRHP: July 27, 1984

The Edward C. Roberts House is a historic building located on the east side of Davenport, Iowa, United States. It has been listed on the National Register of Historic Places since 1984.

== History ==
Edward C. Roberts was the son of Uriah and Julia Roberts. At the time he had this house built in 1909 he was the president of the U.N. Roberts Co. and the Gordon-Van Tine Company. They were both local planing mills that were merged into a single company. His mother Julia ran the U.N. Roberts Company for almost 30 years before he took over its operations. The Roberts firm was the most successful planing mill located in Davenport.

== Architecture ==
The Roberts house appears to be one of the styles that the Gordon-Van Tine Company offered in its catalog. The two-story side porch version was offered in the 1918 Gordon-Van Tine Ready Cut homes catalog, but the house was first offered -- with only a single-story side porch-- in their 1916 Ready Cut homes catalog, which also showed the house on its cover. The house is not a pure example of any architectural style. However, it is one of the few examples of a strong influence of the Prairie School-style found in Davenport. Its symmetry and the prominent entry reflect the influence of the Georgian/Federal Revival, which was very popular in the city. The Prairie School influence is found in its horizontality, which is realized in the low hipped roof, wide eaves, and its windows that are grouped in bands. The stylized columns in antis of the entry combines the Neoclassical with an arrangement that is found on a number of early Prairie School houses by Frank Lloyd Wright and his followers in Oak Park, Illinois and Mason City, Iowa.
