= Roberts House (Barneveld, Wisconsin) =

Historic house in Wisconsin, United States

- U.S. National Register of Historic Places
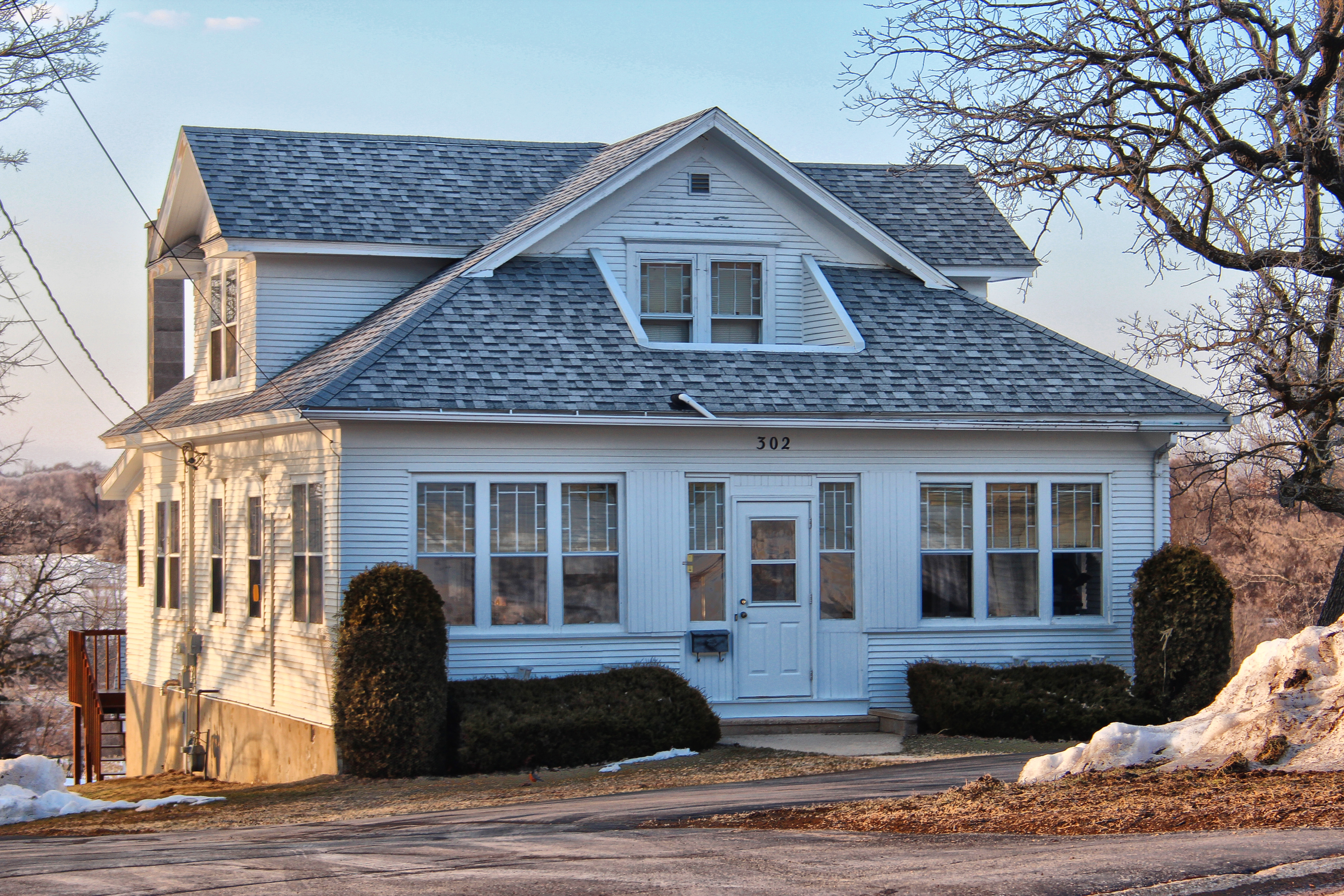
- Roberts House
- Location: 302 Front St., Barneveld, Wisconsin
- Coordinates: 43°01′04″N 89°53′47″W
- Area: 1 acre (0.40 ha)
- Built: 1920
- Architect: John Lewis
- Architectural style: Bungalow
- MPS: Barneveld MRA
- NRHP reference No.: 86002311
- Added to NRHP: September 1, 1988

The Roberts House is a historic house located at 302 Front Street in Barneveld, Wisconsin. Local builder John Lewis constructed the house in 1920. Originally part of a dairy farm, the house is now a rare example of an intact farmhouse in Barneveld. The one-story bungalow features clapboard siding, bands of double-hung windows, and a hip roof with several gabled dormers.

The house was listed on the National Register of Historic Places in 1988 and on the State Register of Historic Places the following year.
