= Robertson House (Kensett, Arkansas) =

Historic house in Arkansas, United States

- U.S. National Register of Historic Places
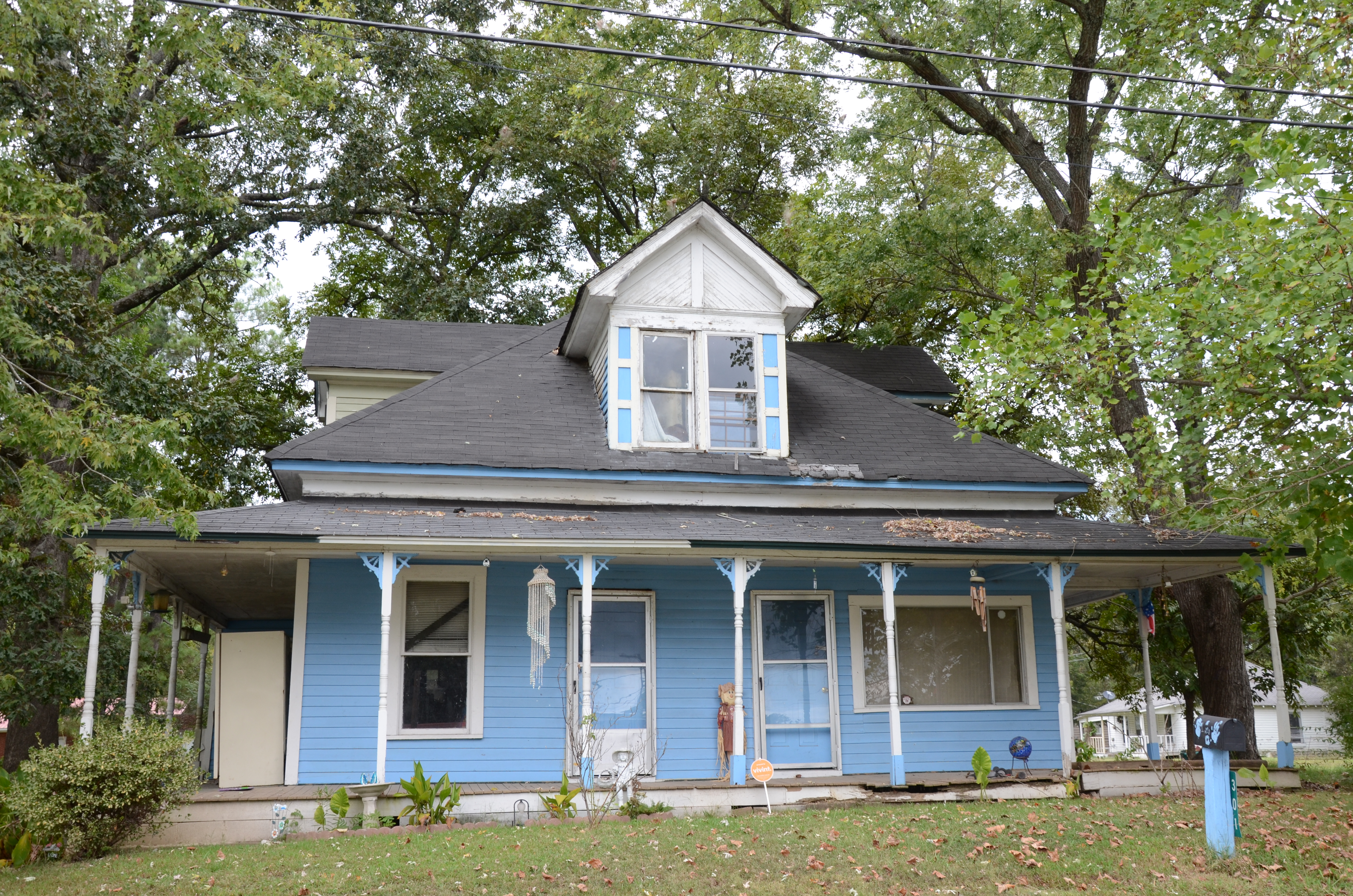

- Location within Arkansas Location within the United States
- Location: Jct.of 2nd and Dandridge Sts., Kensett, Arkansas
- Coordinates: 35°13′55″N 91°40′13″W
- Built: 1910
- Architectural style: Vernacular double-pile
- MPS: White County MPS
- NRHP reference No.: 91001221
- Added to NRHP: September 5, 1991

The Robertson House is a historic house at 2nd and Dandridge Streets in Kensett, Arkansas. It is a 1 1/2-story wood-frame structure, with a dormered hip roof, and a single-story porch wrapping around two sides. The porch is supported by turned posts and sports decorative brackets. Built about 1910, it is one of a number of surviving double-pile houses in White County, a style once built in the area in large numbers.

The house was listed on the National Register of Historic Places in 1991.

== See also ==
- National Register of Historic Places listings in White County, Arkansas
