= Sheeks–Robertson House =

Historic house in Texas, United States

- U.S. National Register of Historic Places
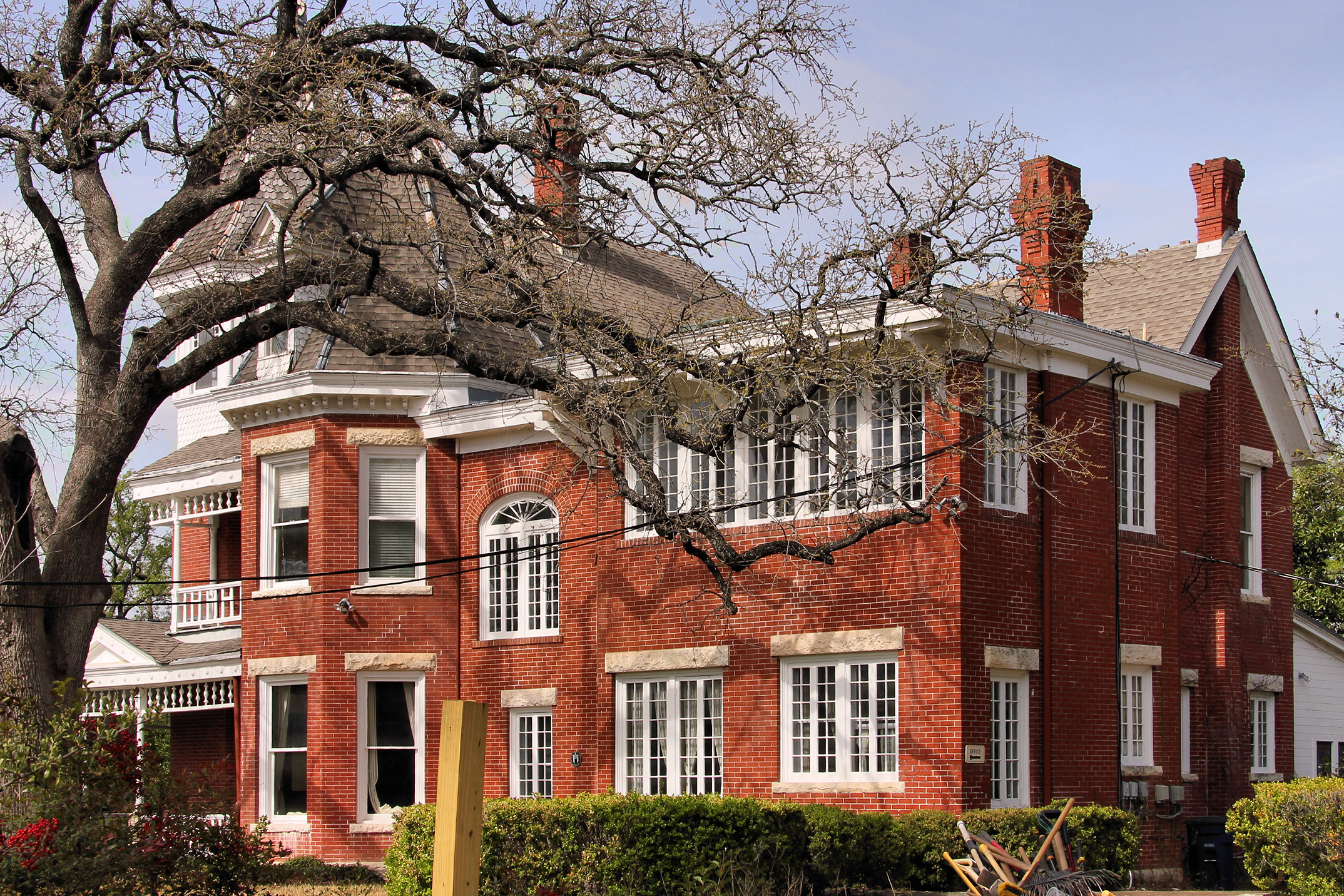
- The Sheeks–Robertson House in 2014

- Location within Texas Location within the United States
- Location: 610 West Lynn Street, Austin, Texas
- Coordinates: 30°16′29.30″N 97°45′45.55″W
- Built: 1897
- NRHP reference No.: 76002073
- Added to NRHP: June 24, 1976

The Sheeks–Robertson House is a historic home in downtown Austin, Texas.

The home is located at Sixth Street and West Lynn. It was added to the National Register of Historic Places in 1976.
