= Roberts Chapel =

Roberts Chapel may refer to:

- Roberts Chapel (Atlanta, Indiana)
- Roberts Chapel United Methodist Church
