= Roberts County Courthouse =

Roberts County Courthouse may refer to:

- Roberts County Courthouse (South Dakota), Sisseton, South Dakota
- Roberts County Courthouse (Texas), Miami, Texas
