= Wisconsin's 51st Assembly district =

American legislative district in southwest Wisconsin

Wisconsin's 51st State Assembly district
- 2024 map defined in 2023 Wisc. Act 94; 2022 map defined in Johnson v. Wisconsin Elections Commission; 2011 map was defined in 2011 Wisc. Act 43
Assemblymember
Todd Novak; R–Dodgeville
since January 3, 2015 (11 years)
- Demographics: 93.9% White; 0.71% Black; 2.75% Hispanic; 0.78% Asian; 1.31% Native American; 0.09% Hawaiian/Pacific Islander
- Population (2020) • Voting age: 59,485; 45,239
- Website: Official website
- Notes: Southwest Wisconsin

The 51st Assembly district of Wisconsin is one of 99 districts in the Wisconsin State Assembly. Located in southern Wisconsin, the district comprises all of Iowa and Lafayette counties, and parts of western Dane County and eastern Grant County. It includes the cities of Cuba City, Darlington, Dodgeville, Mineral Point, and Shullsburg, and the villages of Arena, Argyle, Avoca, Barneveld, Belmont, Benton, Blanchardville, Blue Mounds, Blue River, Cobb, Gratiot, Hazel Green, Highland, Hollandale, Linden, Livingston, Montfort, Mount Horeb, Muscoda, Rewey, Ridgeway, and South Wayne. The district also contains landmarks such as Frank Lloyd Wright's Taliesin estate, the historic Iowa County Courthouse, Governor Dodge State Park, Blue Mound State Park, and Yellowstone Lake State Park. The district is represented by Republican Todd Novak, since January 2015.

The 51st Assembly district is located within Wisconsin's 17th Senate district, along with the 49th and 50th Assembly districts.

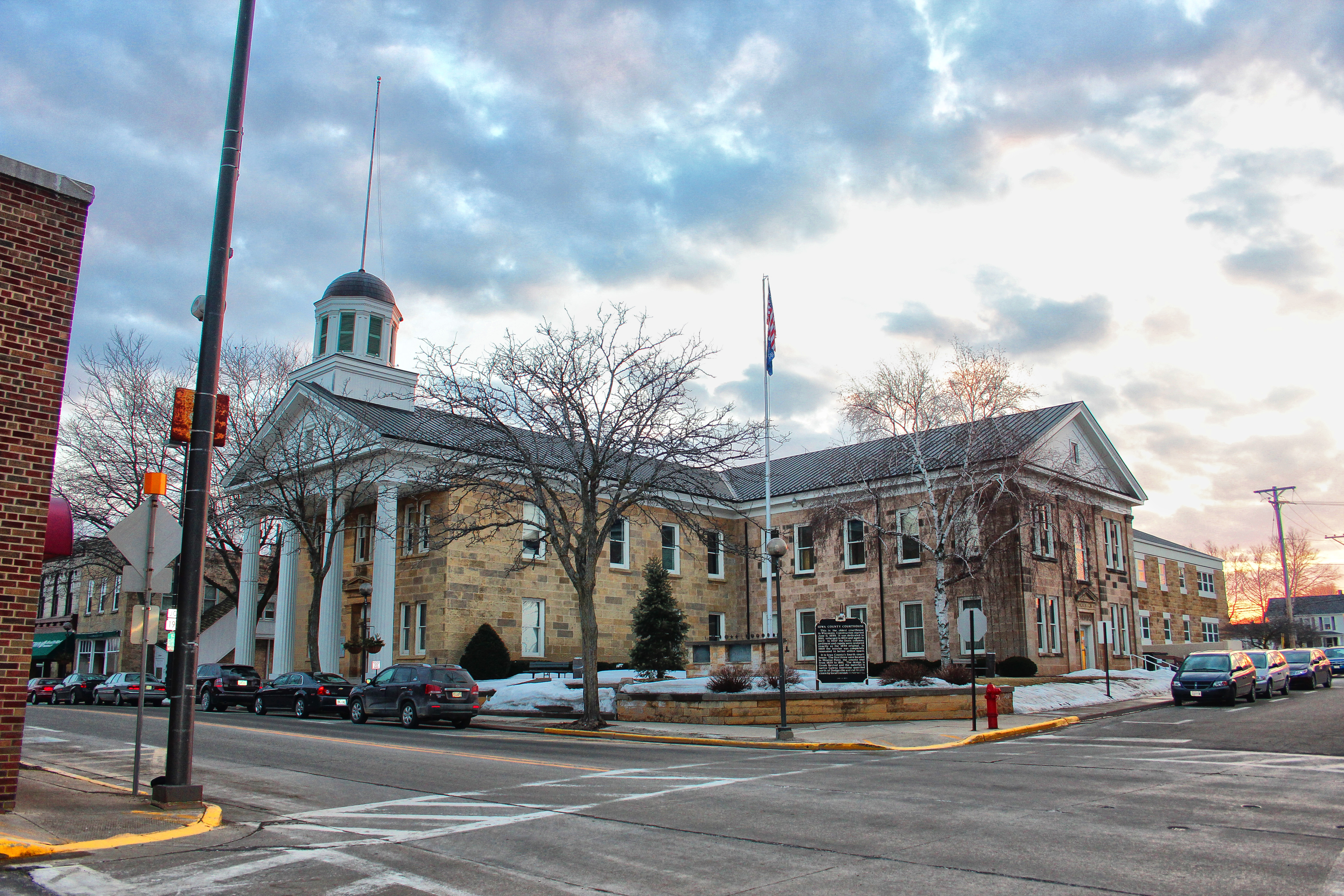
Historic Iowa County Courthouse in Dodgeville

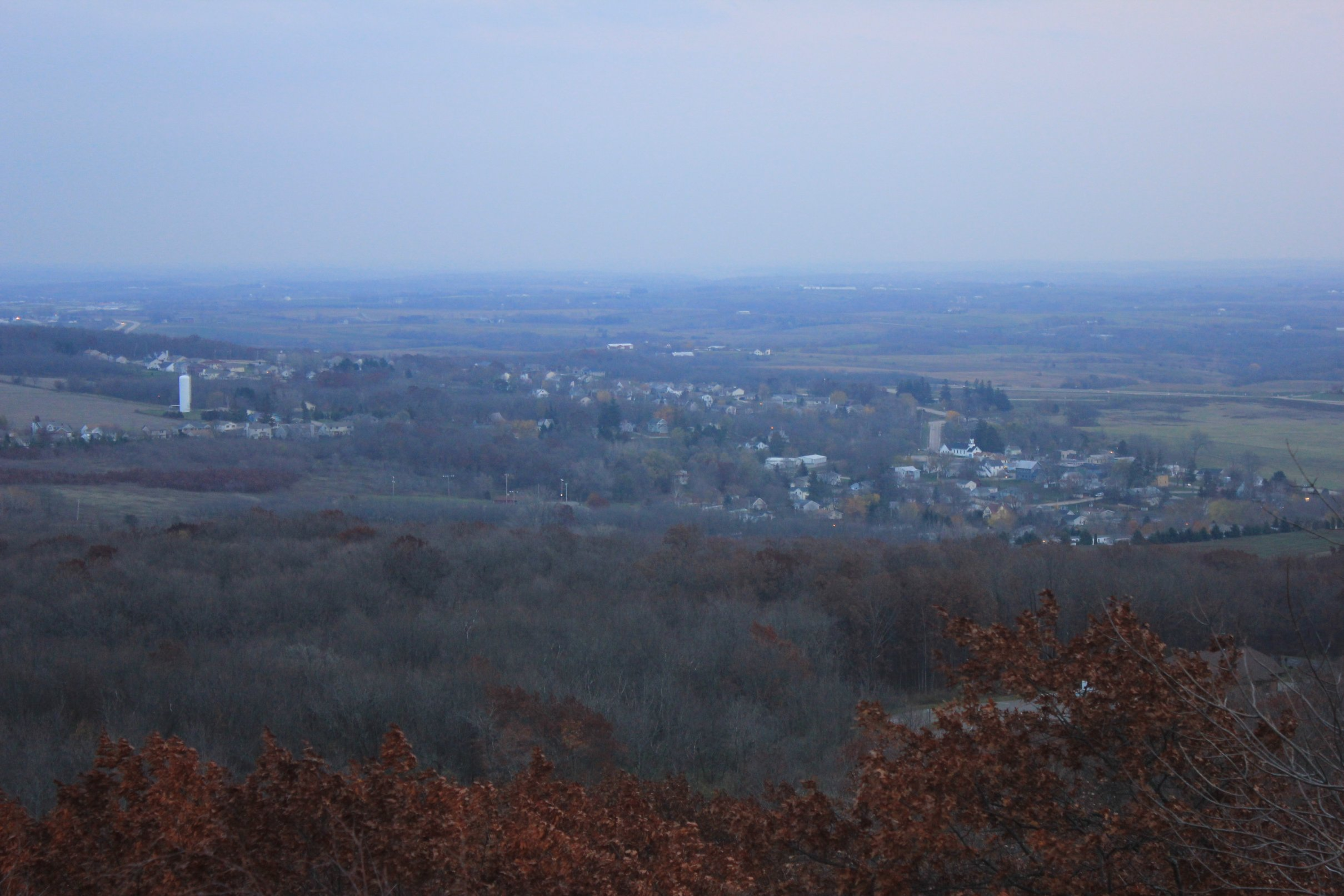
View of Blue Mounds, from Blue Mound State Park

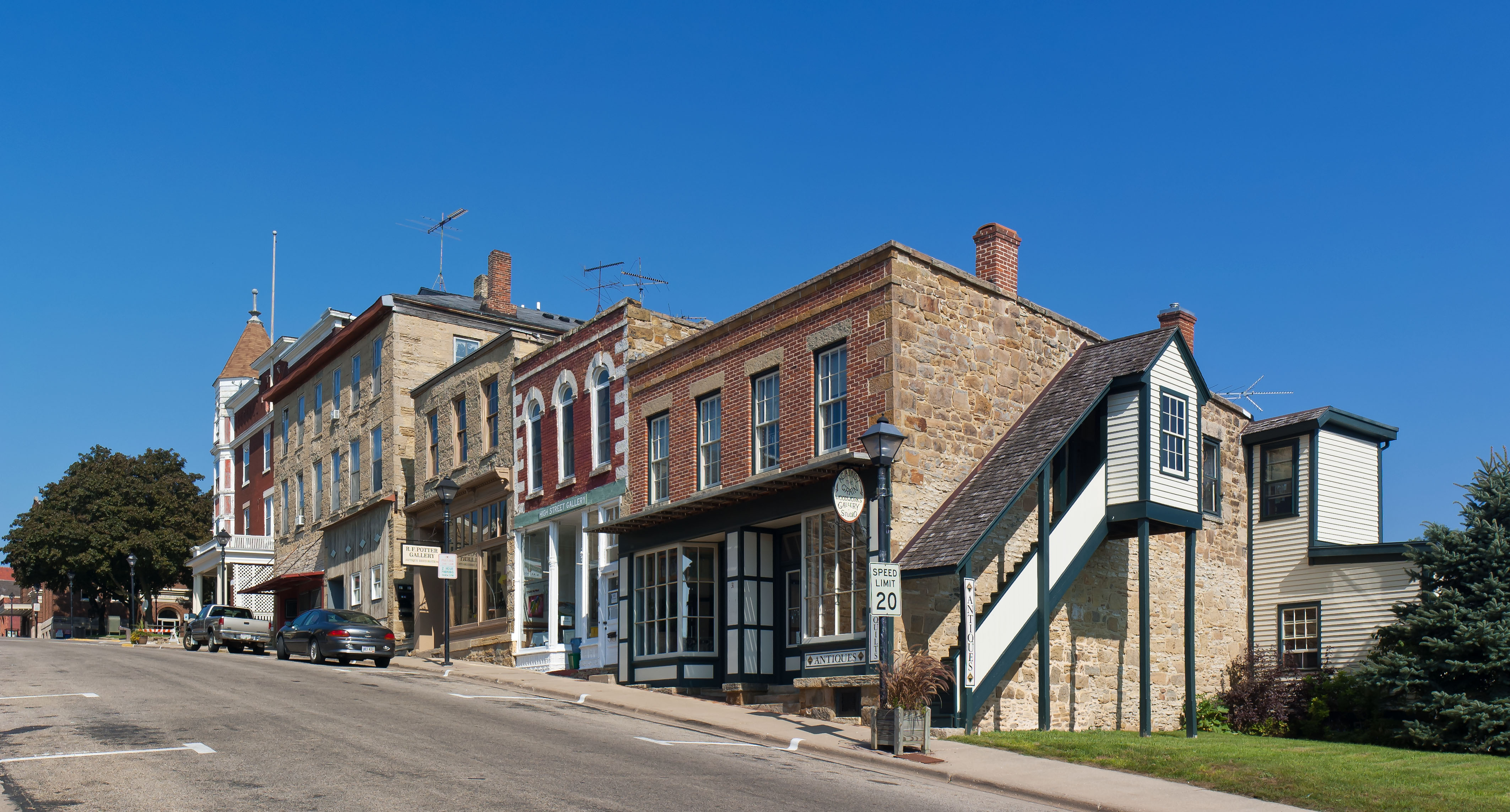
High Street in Mineral Point

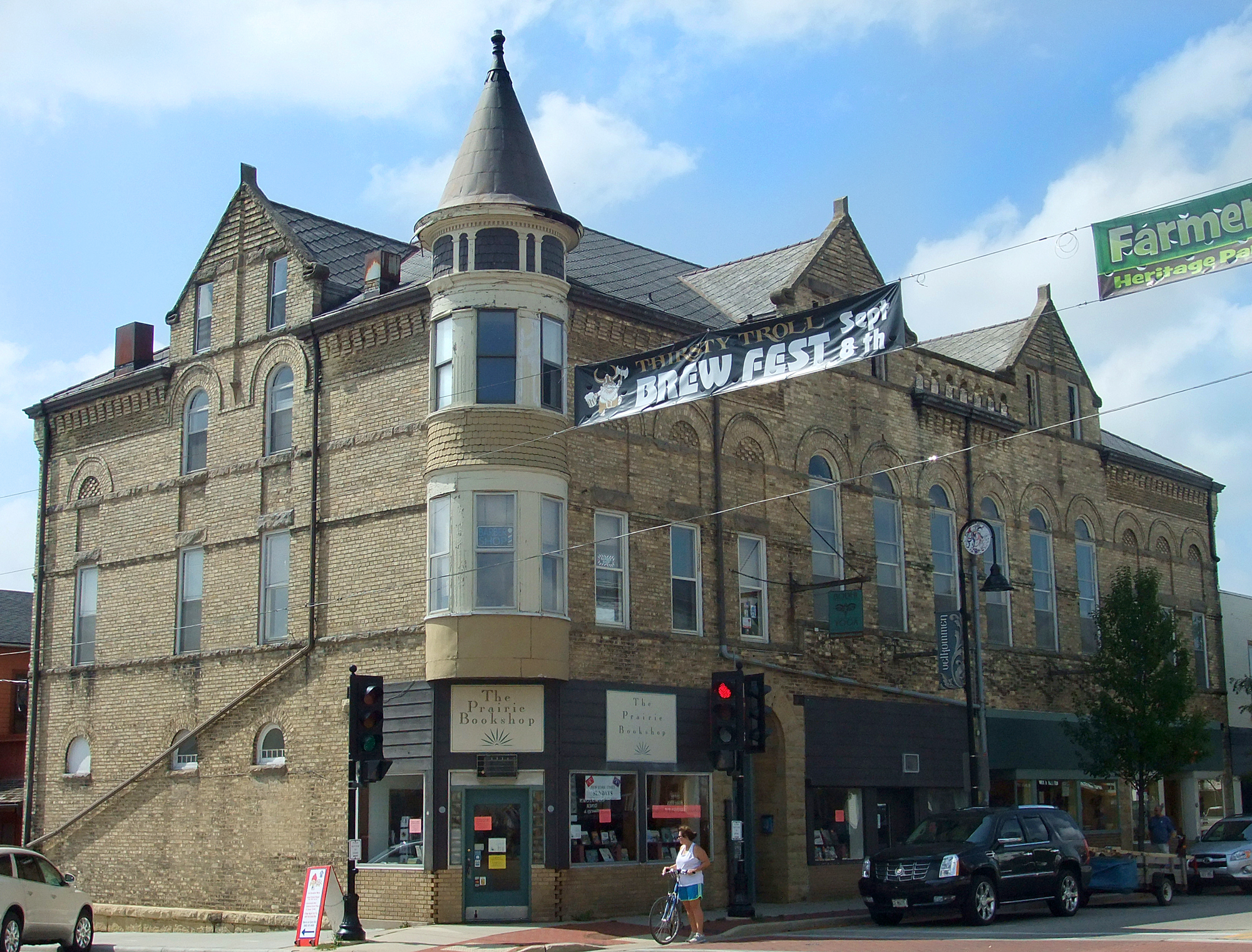
Mt. Horeb Opera Block in Mount Horeb

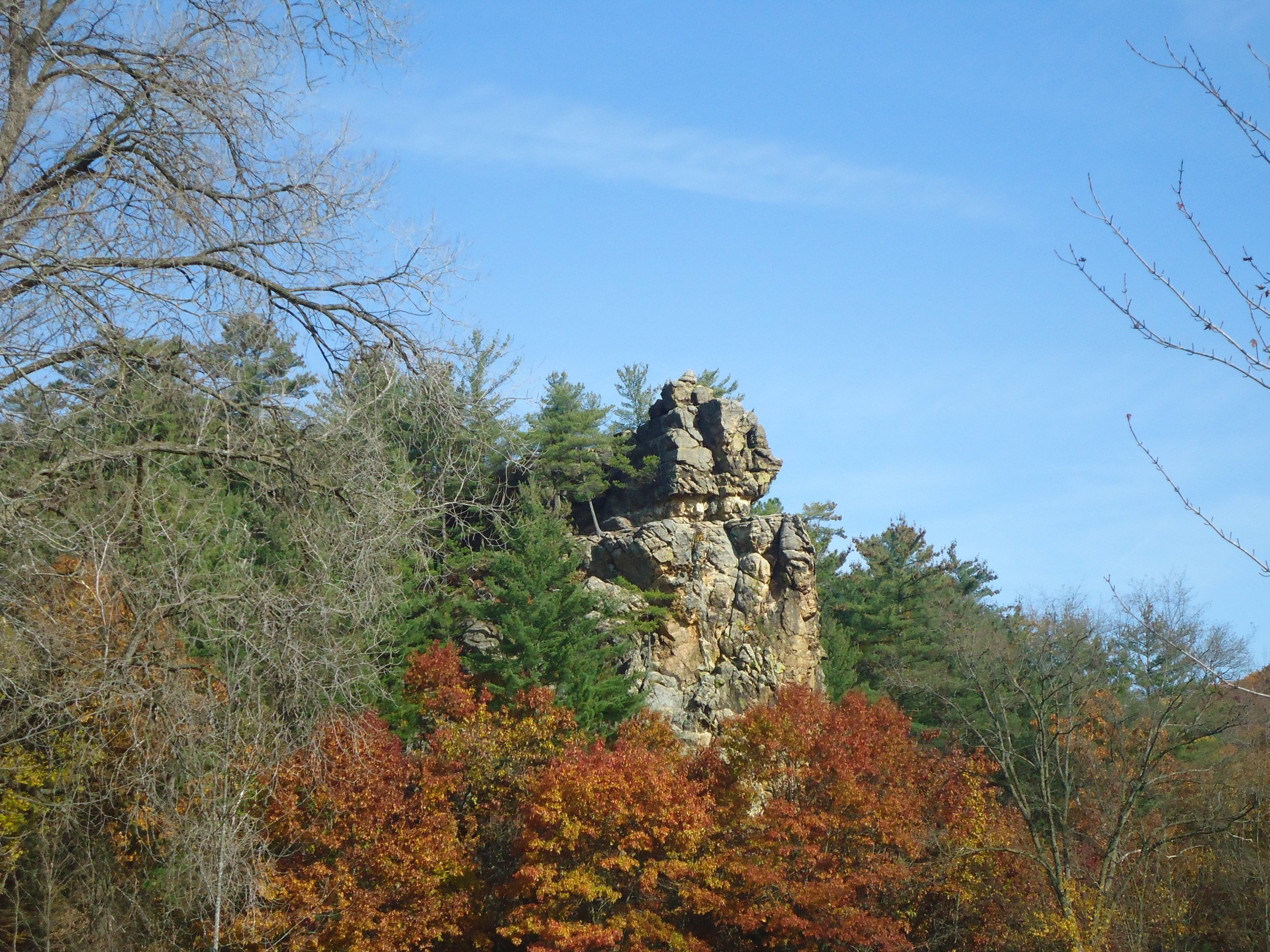
Rock Ledge in Governor Dodge State Park

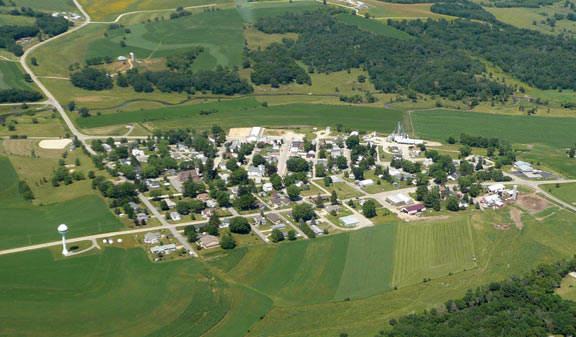
Aerial view of Hollandale

== List of past representatives ==
List of representatives to the Wisconsin State Assembly from the 51st district
Member	Party	Residence	Counties represented	Term start	Term end	Ref.
District created
Joseph E. Tregoning	Rep.	Shullsburg	Green, Lafayette, Rock	January 1, 1973	January 3, 1983	
Patricia Spafford Smith	Dem.	Shell Lake	Barron, Washburn	January 3, 1983	January 7, 1985	
Joseph E. Tregoning	Rep.	Shullsburg	Grant, Iowa, Lafayette	January 7, 1985	May 28, 1990	
--Vacant--			Grant, Iowa, Lafayette	May 28, 1990	January 7, 1991	
Stephen Freese	Rep.	Jamestown	Iowa, Lafayette, Richland, Sauk	January 7, 1991	January 1, 2007	
Steve Hilgenberg	Dem.	Dodgeville	Iowa, Lafayette, Richland, Sauk	January 1, 2007	January 3, 2011	
Howard Marklein	Rep.	Spring Green	Green, Iowa, Lafayette, Richland, Sauk	January 3, 2011	January 3, 2015	
Todd Novak	Rep.	Dodgeville	Green, Iowa, Lafayette, Richland, Sauk	January 3, 2015	Current	
Todd Novak	Rep.	Dodgeville	Dane, Grant, Iowa, Lafayette,	January 3, 2015	Current	
