= WDMP =

WDMP may refer to:

- WDMP-FM, a radio station (99.3 FM) licensed to serve Dodgeville, Wisconsin, United States
- WZRK (AM), a radio station (810 AM) licensed to serve Dodgeville, Wisconsin, which held the call sign WDMP from 1968 to 2018
