= Pleasant Ridge, Wisconsin =

- Unincorporated community
- Location within Wisconsin Location within the United States
- Coordinates: 43°03′17″N 90°04′24″W
- Country: United States
- State: Wisconsin
- County: Iowa
- Town: Dodgeville
- Elevation: 1,247 ft (380 m)
- Time zone: UTC-6 (Central (CST))
  - Summer (DST): UTC-5 (CDT)
- Area code: 608
- GNIS feature ID: 1577773

Pleasant Ridge is an unincorporated community located in the town of Dodgeville, Iowa County, Wisconsin, United States. Pleasant Ridge is located at the intersection of County Highways Z and ZZ, 7 miles (11 km) north-northeast of the city of Dodgeville.
