= Dodgeville (town), Wisconsin =

Dodgeville, Wisconsin
- Town
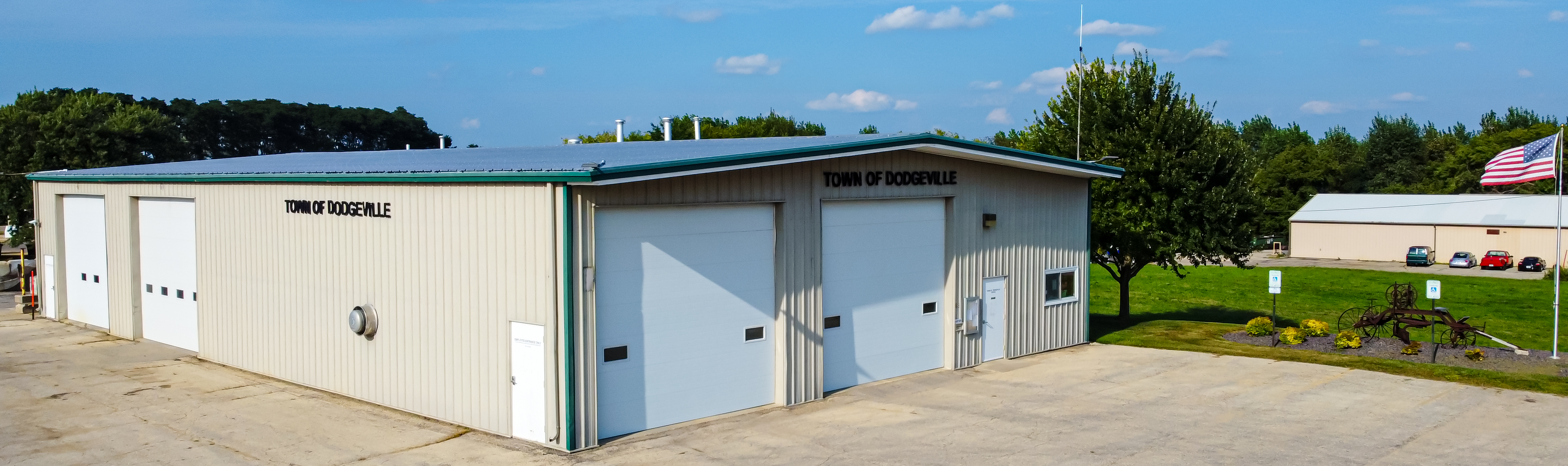
- Town hall

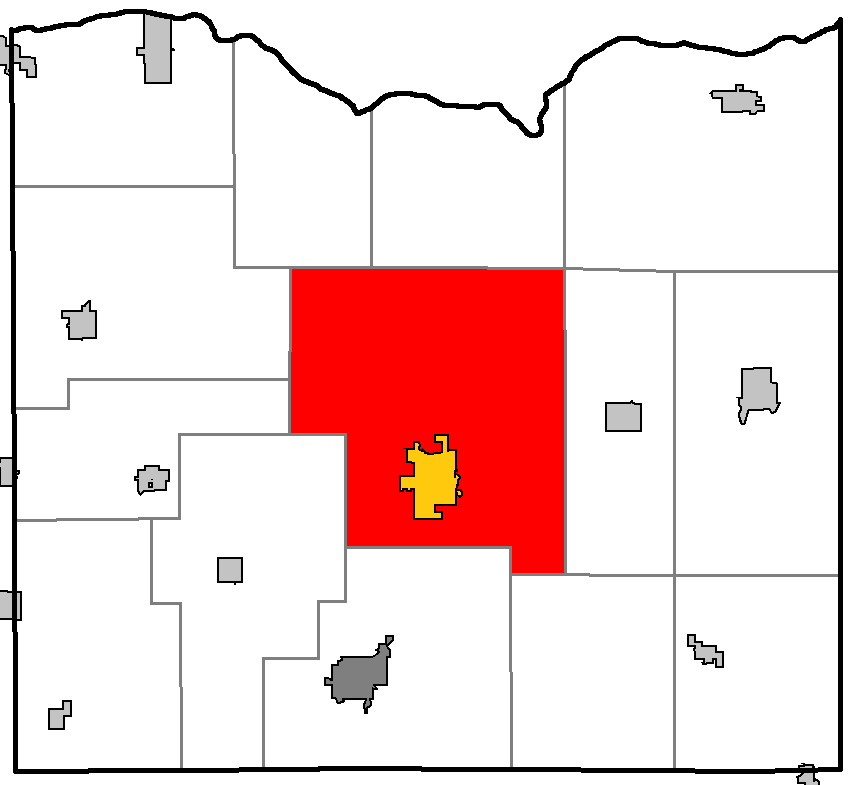
- Location of Dodgeville, within Iowa County, Wisconsin

- Location of Iowa County, Wisconsin
- Coordinates: 42°58′54″N 90°6′54″W
- Country: United States
- State: Wisconsin
- County: Iowa

Area
  - Total: 90.3 sq mi (233.8 km^{2})
  - Land: 89.8 sq mi (232.7 km^{2})
  - Water: 0.39 sq mi (1.0 km^{2})
- Elevation: 1,004 ft (306 m)

Population (2020)
  - Total: 1,586
  - Density: 17.65/sq mi (6.816/km^{2})
- Time zone: UTC-6 (Central (CST))
  - Summer (DST): UTC-5 (CDT)
- Area code: 608
- FIPS code: 55-20375
- GNIS feature ID: 1583088

Dodgeville is a town in Iowa County, Wisconsin, United States. The population was 1,586 at the 2020 census. The City of Dodgeville and the unincorporated community of Pleasant Ridge are located in the town.

== Geography ==
According to the United States Census Bureau, the town has a total area of 90.3 square miles (233.8 km^{2}), of which 89.9 square miles (232.7 km^{2}) is land and 0.4 square mile (1.0 km^{2}) (0.44%) is water.

== Demographics ==
As of the census of 2000, there were 1,407 people, 510 households, and 395 families residing in the town. The population density was 15.7 people per square mile (6.0/km^{2}). There were 588 housing units at an average density of 6.5 per square mile (2.5/km^{2}). The racial makeup of the town was 98.37% White, 0.07% Black or African American, 0.07% Native American, 0.14% Asian, and 1.35% from two or more races. 0.14% of the population were Hispanic or Latino of any race.

There were 510 households, out of which 35.3% had children under the age of 18 living with them, 69.6% were married couples living together, 4.3% had a female householder with no husband present, and 22.4% were non-families. 17.5% of all households were made up of individuals, and 5.3% had someone living alone who was 65 years of age or older. The average household size was 2.76 and the average family size was 3.15.

In the town, the population was spread out, with 28.6% under the age of 18, 5.5% from 18 to 24, 27.1% from 25 to 44, 27.4% from 45 to 64, and 11.4% who were 65 years of age or older. The median age was 39 years. For every 100 females, there were 102.4 males. For every 100 females age 18 and over, there were 104.7 males.

The median income for a household in the town was $49,327, and the median income for a family was $58,203. Males had a median income of $34,474 versus $26,591 for females. The per capita income for the town was $22,521. About 3.1% of families and 4.9% of the population were below the poverty line, including 2.4% of those under age 18 and 6.8% of those age 65 or over.

== Transportation ==
- Dodgeville Municipal Airport was located in the town.
