= Governor Dodge State Park =

State park in Iowa County, Wisconsin

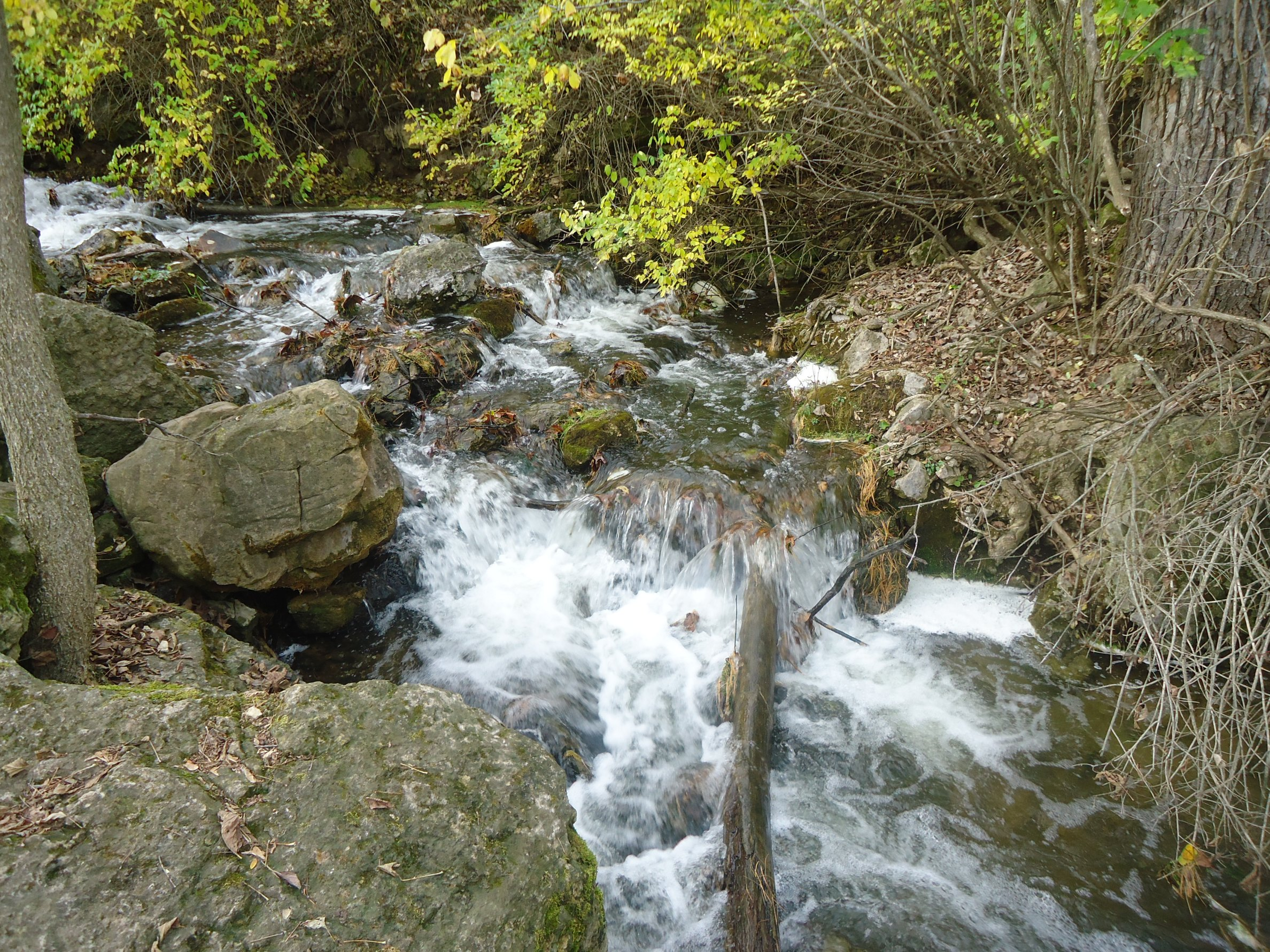

- Location within Wisconsin Location within the United States
- Interactive map of Governor Dodge State Park
- Location: Iowa County, Wisconsin, United States
- Coordinates: 43°1′29″N 90°6′23″W
- Area: 5,270 acres (2,130 ha)
- Elevation: 902 ft (275 m)
- Established: 1948
- Administrator: Wisconsin Department of Natural Resources
- Named for: Henry Dodge
- Website: Official website
- Wisconsin State Parks

Governor Dodge State Park is a 5,270-acre (2,133 ha) Wisconsin state park outside Dodgeville in Iowa County, Wisconsin. Named after Henry Dodge, the first governor of the Wisconsin Territory, the park contains geologic features indicative of the Driftless Area. It is located 4.1 miles north of the Central business district of the City of Dodgeville.

The land is mostly oak and hickory forest with some sandstone bluff outcroppings and one named waterfall, Stephen's Falls. Common activities include boating (electric motors only), fishing, picnicking and swimming on the park's two lakes, Cox Hollow Lake and Twin Valley Lake. There is a boat launch, dam and a swimming area at each of the lakes. Away from the lakes one can find hiking trails, cross-country ski trails, mountain bike trails and horse trails. Seasonal activities include hunting in the fall and snowmobiling in the winter.

A concession stand is maintained by the Dodgeville Kiwanis near Cox Hollow Beach. Food, gifts, clothing and basic camping gear can be purchased. The stand offers boat, canoe and paddle-boat rentals for visitors to both lakes.

Like most Wisconsin State Parks, Governor Dodge State park allows overnight camping. 267 family campsites, 8 group campsites, 11 family sites for horse campers, 2 group sites for horse campers and 6 backpack sites are available throughout the summer months. Several family campsites are open year-round.

== Fauna ==
There is a large variety of fauna in the park, such as White-tailed Deer, shrew, wild turkey, ruffed grouse, beaver, red fox, gray fox, woodchuck, muskrat, Red-tailed hawk, turkey vulture, pileated woodpecker, barred owl, raccoon and Coyote. There are also more than 150 species of birds.

== Flora ==
There is also a varied flora in the park, such as trees and flowers. Some types include oak, hickory, white pine, red pine, jack pine, bloodroot, hepatica, Dutchman's breeches, interrupted fern, goldenrod, sunflower, aster, milkweed, boneset, iron weed and mountain mint.

== Gallery ==
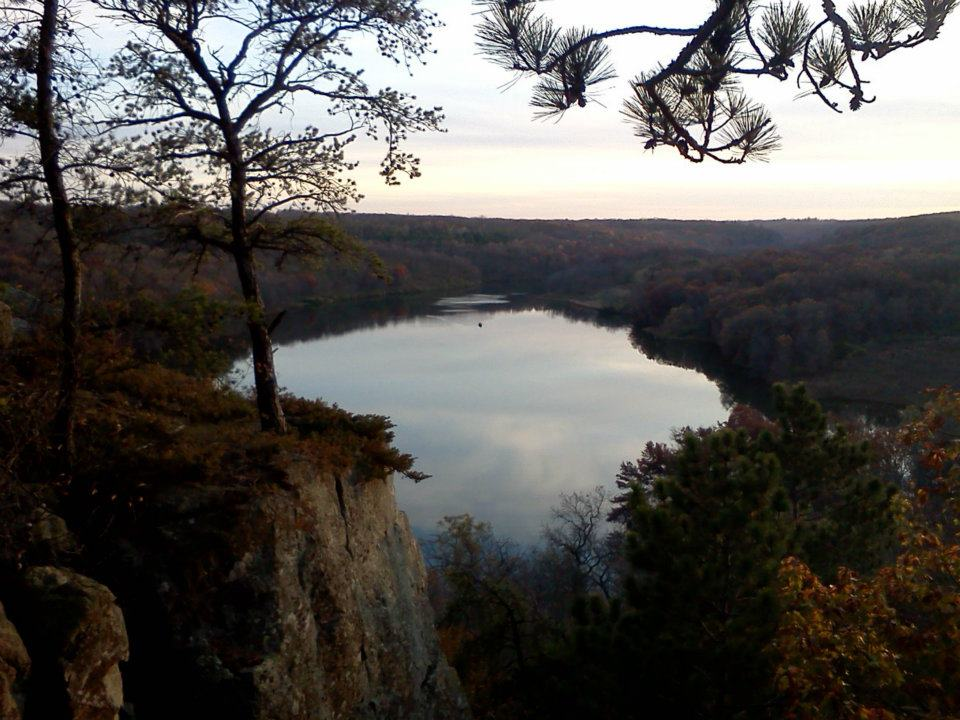
Cox Hollow Lake

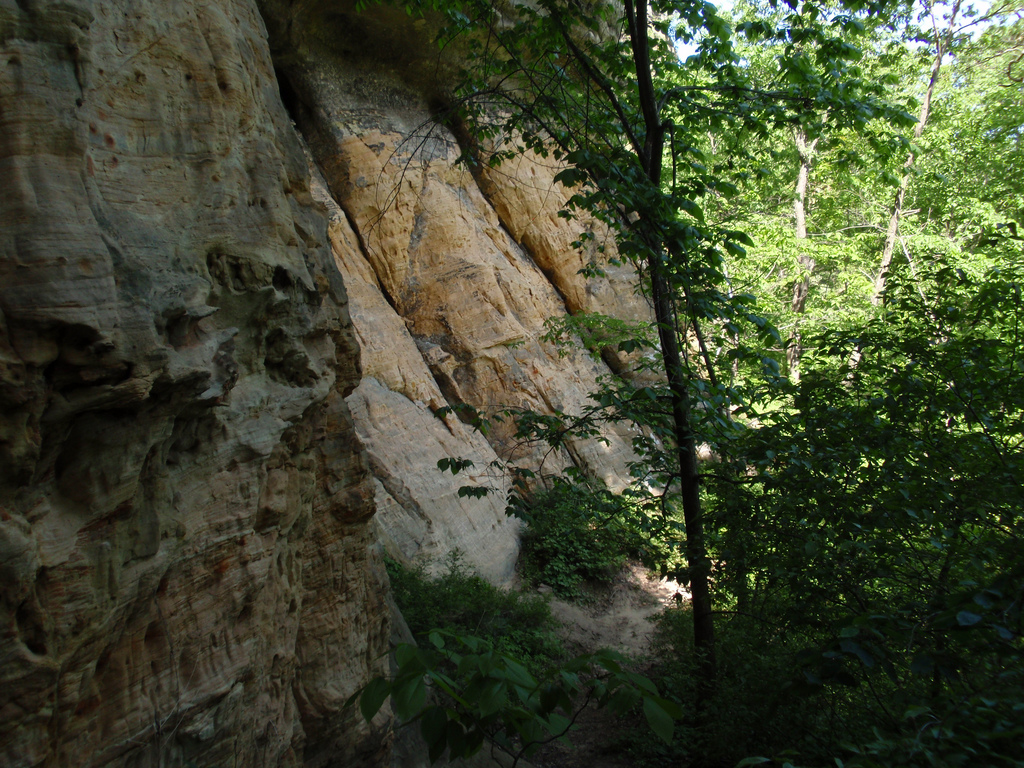
Deer Cove

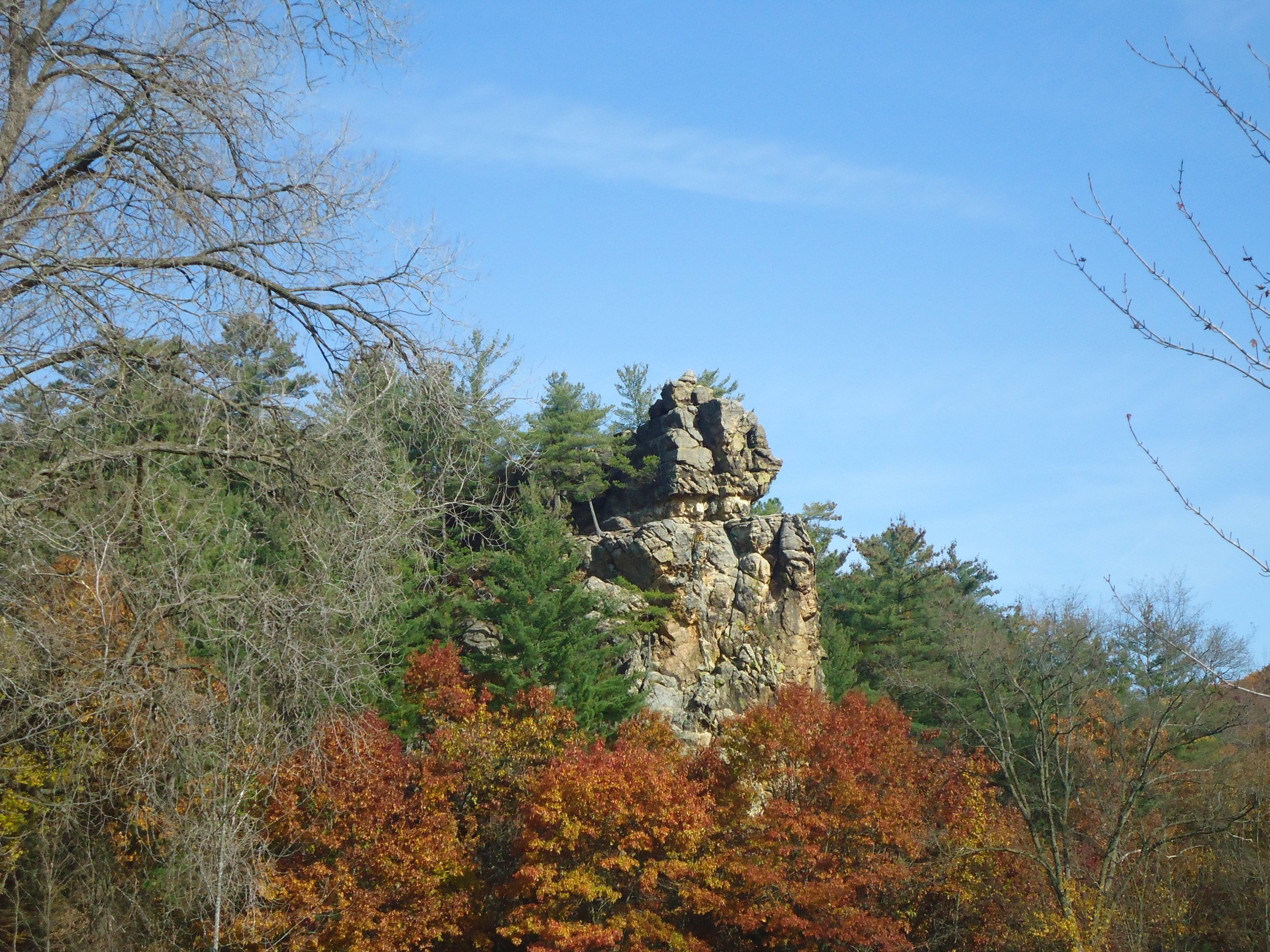
Enee Point

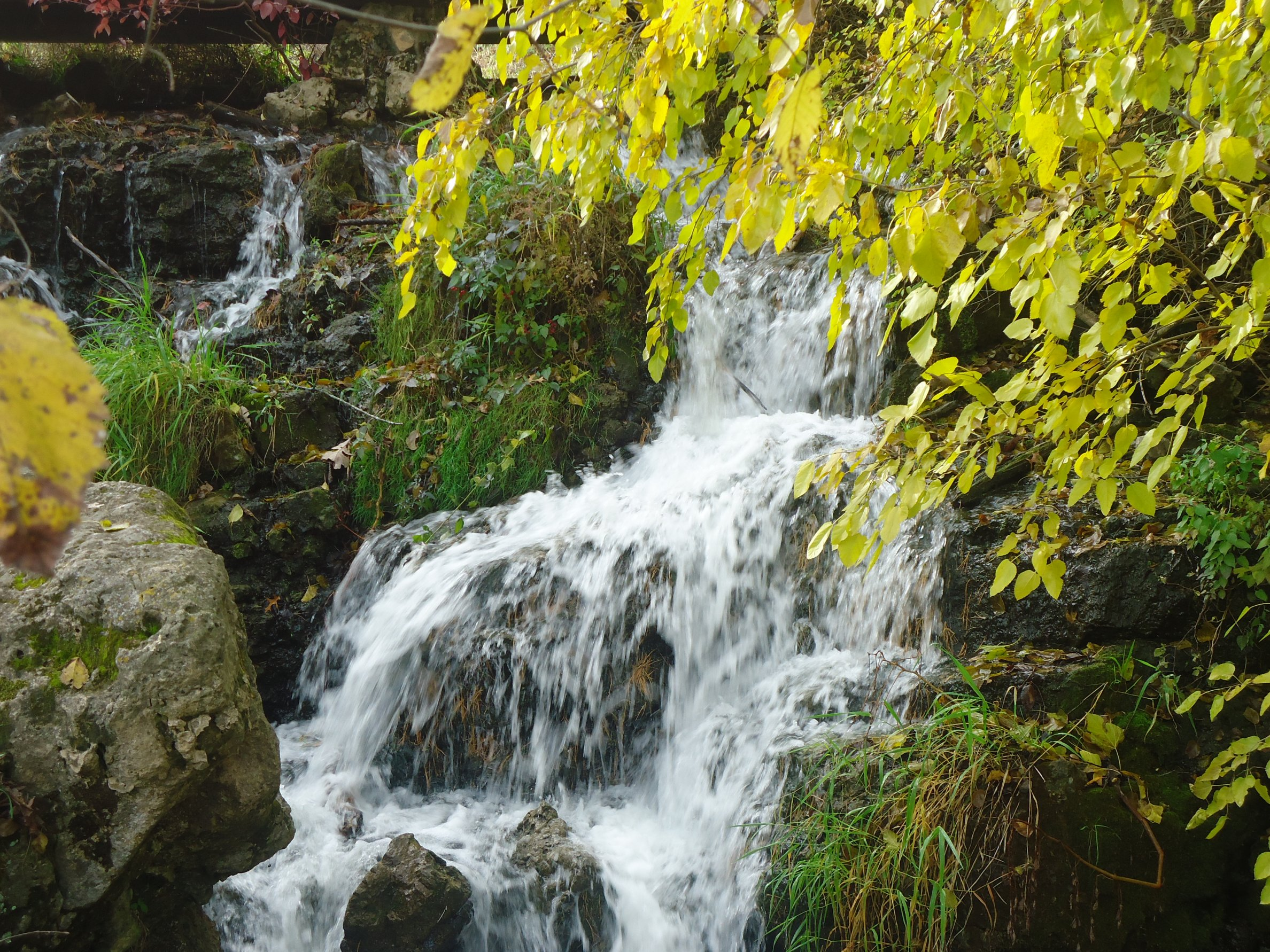
Cox Hollow Falls

== Support ==
The Friends of Governor Dodge State Park is a group of volunteers working to support recreation, education and environmental stewardship in the park through periodic meetings and hosting work days to better the park.
