= John "Weenie" Wilson =

American football, basketball, and baseball coach and teacher (1914–1968)

Profile
- Positions: Halfback; Punter

Personal information
- Born: October 30, 1914; Richland Center, Wisconsin, U.S.
- Died: October 30, 1968 (aged 54); Dodgeville, Wisconsin, U.S.
- Listed height: 5 ft 8 in (1.73 m)
- Listed weight: 168 lb (76 kg)

Career information
- High school: Richland Center (Richland Center, Wisconsin)
- College: Wisconsin

Career history
- Green Bay Packers (1938)*
- * Offseason or practice squad member only

John "Weenie" Wilson (October 30, 1914 – October 30, 1968) was an American football, basketball, and baseball coach and teacher at the Dodgeville High School in Dodgeville, Wisconsin. He was a nationally ranked punter while at the University of Wisconsin and played for the Green Bay Packers before enlisting in the United States Navy prior to World War II. He is the only coach to be inducted into all three Wisconsin high school sports halls of fame, for football, basketball, and baseball.

== Early life ==
Wilson graduated from Richland Center High School in Richland Center, Wisconsin in 1933. He helped lead his basketball team to the 1933 WIAA State Basketball Tournament (WFCA). Wilson played football at the University of Wisconsin from 1933 to 1935. He became a starter as a halfback in 1935. Wilson was a "nationally ranked punter and also returned a punt for one of the longest returns of that era." Wilson was also an accomplished baseball player and played one season of minor league ball for the Williamson Colts in 1937 prior to returning to his football career. He "joined the Green Bay Packers in 1938," but decided to join and serve "in the U.S. Navy during WWII" from 1939 to 1943. After his honorable discharge, John "entered Spring Training with the St. Louis Cardinals baseball team (WFCA)." Wilson received his physical education degree in 1944 from the University of Dubuque.

== Teaching career ==
Wilson taught physical education for Dodgeville High School, located in Dodgeville, Wisconsin. He became the head football coach for Dodgeville in 1944 until 1968. John was also the head basketball and baseball coach. After suffering two heart attacks in 1961, Wilson "died of a heart attack during a physical education class in 1968".

== Coaching ==
=== Football ===
He coached the Dodgeville Dodger football team to a record of 47–43–6 over his 17 years as head coach. The Dodger football teams achieved four co-conference championships during his terms as head coach. He, as a defensive coordinator in 1958, led a Dodger defense that only gave up 20 points over an 8-game season. He was inducted to the Wisconsin Football Coaches Association Hall of Fame in 1996.

=== Basketball ===
Wilson led the Dodgeville Dodgers to a record of 349–141, seven conference championships, two state appearances, and one state championship during his tenure as head coach. He coached the Dodgers from the 1945–46 season until the 1967–68 season. Dodgeville's state championship victory occurred in 1964, after previously being a runner-up in 1963. The 59–45 state championship victory over Milwaukee North in 1964 topped off a perfect 26–0 season for the Dodgeville Dodgers. The 1965 team, led by those who were in their junior year on the 1964 team, went 14–4. That team lost in the state regional finals to ultimate 1965 state champion, Monroe, ending an incredible coaching era for Wilson.

=== Baseball ===
Wilson coached the Dodger baseball teams from 1947 to 1968. The teams amassed a record of 166–42, ten conference championships, and four state appearances during that time. His teams made appearances in the state tournament in 1949, 1962, and 1963.

=== Cross country ===
Although Wilson coached cross country for only one year, he was the first cross country coach in Dodgeville in 1965. The team took fifth place at the sectional meet.

== Legacy ==
Wilson was known for his willingness to go above and beyond his responsibilities as a teacher and coach. He always worked very hard for his players and "got several of them college opportunities they never would have gotten on their own (WFCA)." He worked in the community as the leader of the "summer recreation program for the city of Dodgeville (WFCA)." In 1961, Wilson "spent nine weeks in an oxygen tent at the Appleton Memorial hospital in critical condition after two heart attacks." Wilson was back to teaching and coaching when the school year started, "proud of the fact that his brush with death never caused him to miss a day of work (Kirkby)."

== Awards and honors ==
- All-Area Coach of the Year: 1962–1963, 1963–1964
- Area Pen and Mike Sportsman of the Year: 1962–1963, 1963–1964
- Coach of the Sountern All-State Football team: 1951–1952
- Conference Coach of the Year: 1946–1947, 1951–1952, 1957–1958, 1958–1959, 1962–1963, 1963–1964
- Wisconsin Football Coaches Association Hall of Fame: 1996
- Wisconsin Basketball Coaches Association Hall of Fame: 1979
- Wisconsin Baseball Coaches Association Hall of Fame: 1979
