= Thomas Evans (Wisconsin politician) =

American politician

Thomas Meredith Evans (November 25, 1848 – September 25, 1919) was a member of the Wisconsin State Assembly.

== Biography ==
Evans was born on November 25, 1848, in Iowa County, Wisconsin. He attended the University of Wisconsin-Madison.

On July 1, 1875, Evans married Margaret J. Davis. They had eleven children and resided in Dodgeville, Wisconsin. Evans died on September 25, 1919, from injuries sustained during an accident while operating a grader.

== Career ==
Evans was elected to the Assembly in 1910. He made his living farming and roadworking.
