= Glenn A. Abbey =

American diplomat

Glenn Allan Abbey
- Born: June 11, 1898; Dodgeville, Wisconsin
- Died: January 28, 1962 (aged 63); San Antonio, Texas
- Occupation: Politician

Glenn A. Abbey (June 11, 1898 – January 28, 1962) was an American diplomat.

== Biography ==
Abbey was born Glenn Allan Abbey on June 11, 1898, to William Searle and Ida Elmira Abbey in Dodgeville, Wisconsin. He attended Georgetown University. He died on January 28, 1962, in San Antonio, Texas.

== Military service ==
Abbey served in the United States Army during World War I. He joined the army on 23 February 1918 and became a sergeant.

== Career ==
After serving in Haiti, Abbey served as U.S. vice consul in Johannesburg, South Africa from 1928 to 1931. This was followed by positions in Nicaragua, Venezuela, Argentina, Paraguay, and Washington, D.C. He was appointed consul at Bombay in 1946. Later he served as U.S. consul in Salonika, Greece from 1950 to 1951. He was the last to serve in the U.S. consulate in Salonika before the rank was changed to Consul General. Abbey was also Counselor of the Legation in Saudi Arabia until June 5, 1953, after which he was transferred to Barcelona, where he was Consul General.

He is buried at Mission Burial Park South, San Antonio, Texas.
