= Dodge Mining Camp Cabin =

Historic house in Wisconsin, United States

- U.S. National Register of Historic Places
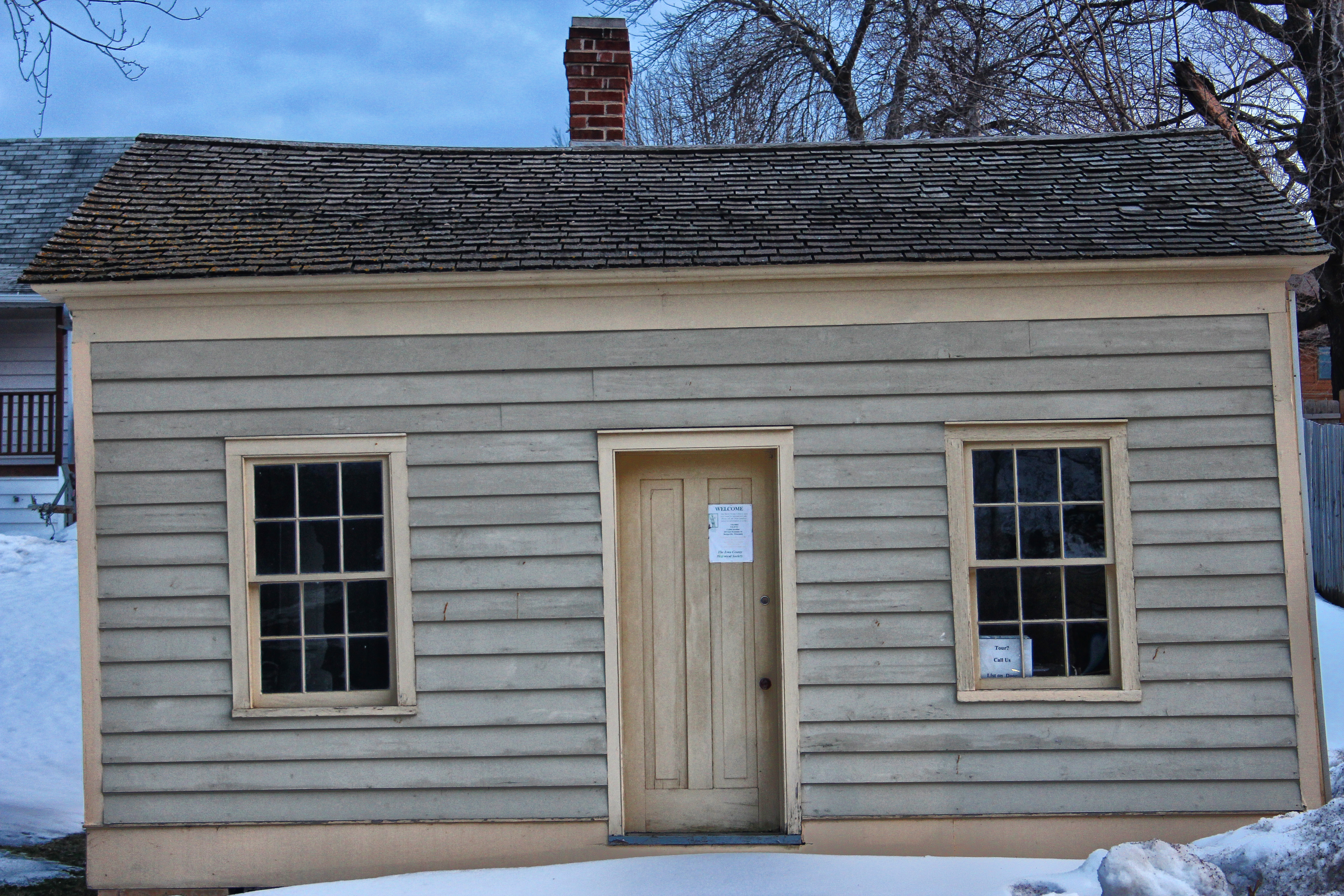
- Dodge Mining Camp Cabin
- Location: 205 E. Fountain St., Dodgeville, Wisconsin
- Coordinates: 42°57′32″N 90°07′44″W
- Area: less than one acre
- Built: 1827
- NRHP reference No.: 05000952
- Added to NRHP: September 1, 2005

The Dodge Mining Camp Cabin is located in Dodgeville, Wisconsin.

== History ==
The cabin was built by Henry Dodge. Dodge was a noted military officer who would later become Governor of the Wisconsin Territory and a member of the United States House of Representatives and the United States Senate. Believed to be the oldest building in Iowa County, Wisconsin, the cabin was previously located down the road at 217 East Fountain Street before being moved to its current location. Currently, it serves as a museum. It was added to the State and the National Register of Historic Places in 2005.

== See also ==
- List of the oldest buildings in Wisconsin
