= Dodgeville Municipal Airport =

- IATA: none; ICAO: none

Summary
- Airport type: Municipal airport
- Location: Dodgeville
- Opened: May 1967
- Closed: 1989-1990
- Time zone: CDS (-5:00)
  - Summer (DST): CST (-6:00)
- Elevation AMSL: 1,245 ft / 379 m
- Coordinates: 42°59′43″N 90°08′33.5″W

Map

Runways
Direction	Length		Surface
Direction	ft	m	Surface
12/30	2,800	853	Asphalt

The Dodgeville Municipal Airport was a municipal airfield near Dodgeville, Wisconsin. It operated from approximately 1967 until around 1989–1990. The property was later acquired by a local construction firm. As of 2017, the runway, ramp, and hangar still exist, with the outdoor paved surfaces being used for equipment storage. The only surviving airport in Iowa County, Wisconsin, is located in Mineral Point.

== History ==
Built at some point between May and December 1967, it operated as a small, unpaved municipal airport called Governor Dodge Quinn Airport. The exact date is unknown as it doesn't appear on the Milwaukee Sectional Chart until December 1967. It was later renamed Dodgeville at some point within the next 3 years according to the May 1970 Milwaukee Sectional Chart.

The Dodgeville Airport closed (for reasons unknown) at some point between 1989 and 1990, as it wasn't depicted on the May 1990 or April 1994 Chicago Sectional Charts.

== C-97 display ==
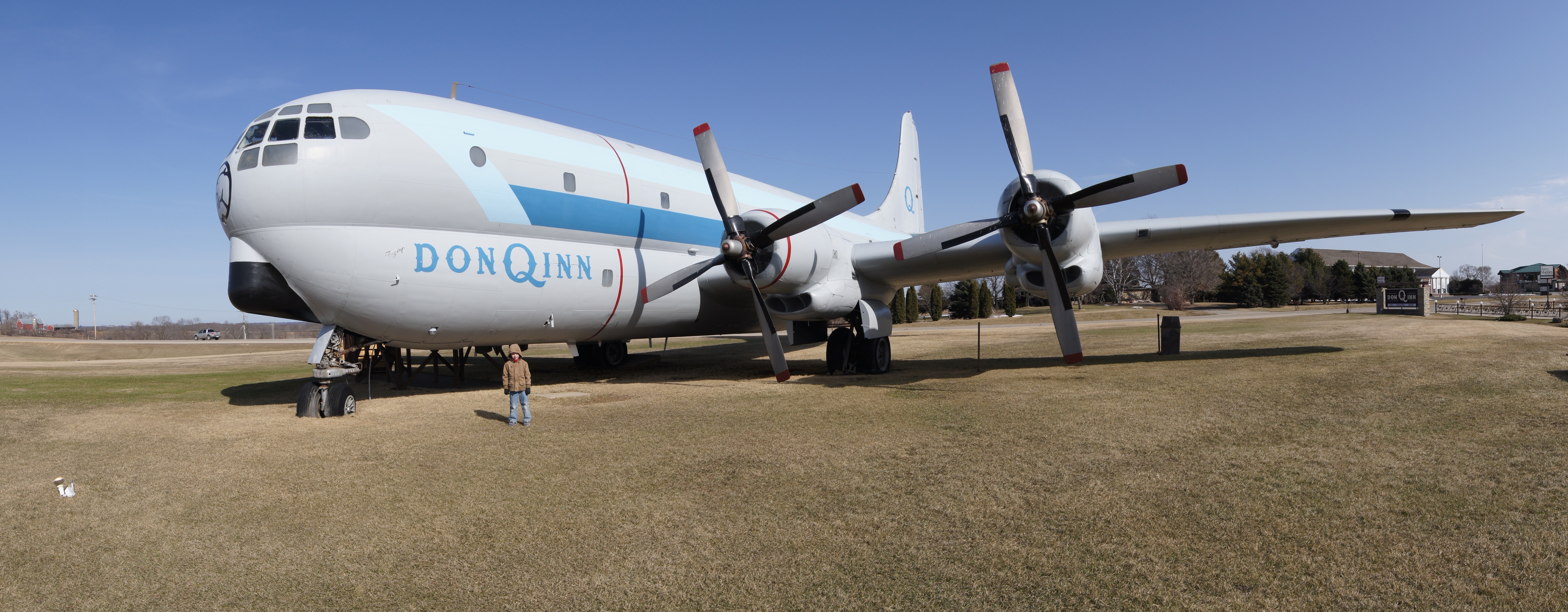

One of the landmarks in the area is currently on display at an inn next to the Dodgeville Municipal Airport. In 1977, the former owners of the Don Q Inn bought an old Boeing C-97G. Its history was connected to two commercials for the Mercury Cougar in 1975 and actress Farrah Fawcett's signature was purported to be on fuselage until it was painted over in approximately 2010. The plane, whose tail number is N227AR (S/N 52-2764), was built in 1952 and it logged a total of 10,068 hours of flight before being landed at the airport to much publicity on the airport's comparatively tiny 2,800' runway in 1977. As it landed, the main landing gear was a full 3 feet (0.91 m) outside the edge of the runway, creating a cloud of dust as the pilot, Dick Schmidt, threw on the brakes and killed the engines to stop the massive plane.

The original plans called for the plane to be converted into a restaurant outside the Inn, but when it appeared to be improbable, the owner decided to leave it intact and to stand as a museum of sorts. The plane, for a while, was used for storage then cleaned up before falling into a state of disrepair.
