= Iowa Street Historic District =

Historic district in Wisconsin, United States

- U.S. National Register of Historic Places
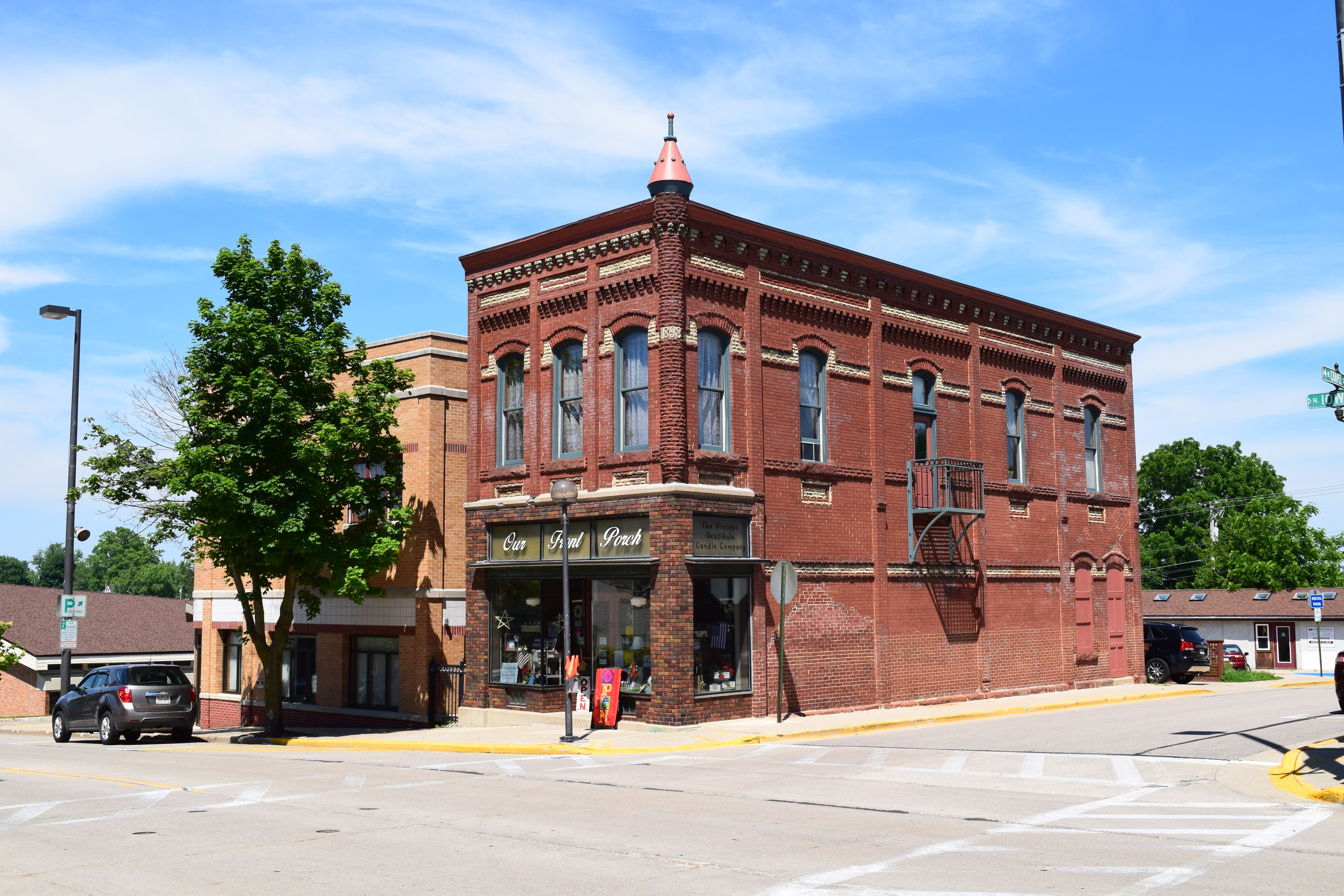
- A portion of the district.
- Location: Roughly, Iowa St. from Division St. to Diagonal St., Dodgeville, Wisconsin
- Area: 9 acres (3.6 ha)
- NRHP reference No.: 96000991
- Added to NRHP: September 6, 1996

The Iowa Street Historic District is located in Dodgeville, Wisconsin, United States.

== Description ==
The district is made up of Dodgeville's old downtown, including the 1859 Greek Revival Iowa County Courthouse, the 1888 Italianate-styled Ford hardware store, the 1901 Queen Anne Auditorium (opera house), the 1919 Neoclassical-styled First National Bank, the 1922 Commercial Craftsman Pollard harness shop, and the 1940 Art Deco Commonwealth Telephone Company.

== See also ==
- National Register of Historic Places listings in Iowa County, Wisconsin
