= WDMP-FM =

- Dodgeville, Wisconsin; United States
- Broadcast area: Madison, Wisconsin
- Frequency: 99.3 MHz
- Branding: D99.3 FM

Programming
- Format: Country

Ownership
- Owner: Dodge Point Broadcasting Co.
- Sister stations: WZRK

History
- First air date: November 1, 1968 (at 107.1)
- Former frequencies: 107.1 MHz (1968–1974)
- Call sign meaning: Dodgeville-Mineral Point

Technical information
- Licensing authority: FCC
- Facility ID: 17056
- Class: A
- ERP: 1,550 watts
- HAAT: 140 meters (460 ft)
- Transmitter coordinates: 42°55′10.00″N 90°8′6.00″W

Links
- Public license information: Public file; LMS
- Webcast: Listen Live
- Website: d99point3.com

WDMP-FM (99.3 FM) is a radio station broadcasting a Country music format. Licensed to Dodgeville, Wisconsin, United States, the station serves the Southwest Wisconsin and West Madison Metropolitan area. The station is currently owned by Dodge Point Broadcasting Co. Prior to broadcasting on 99.3 MHz, WDMP-FM was originally located at 107.1 on the FM dial.
