= Iowa County Courthouse (Wisconsin) =

- U.S. National Register of Historic Places
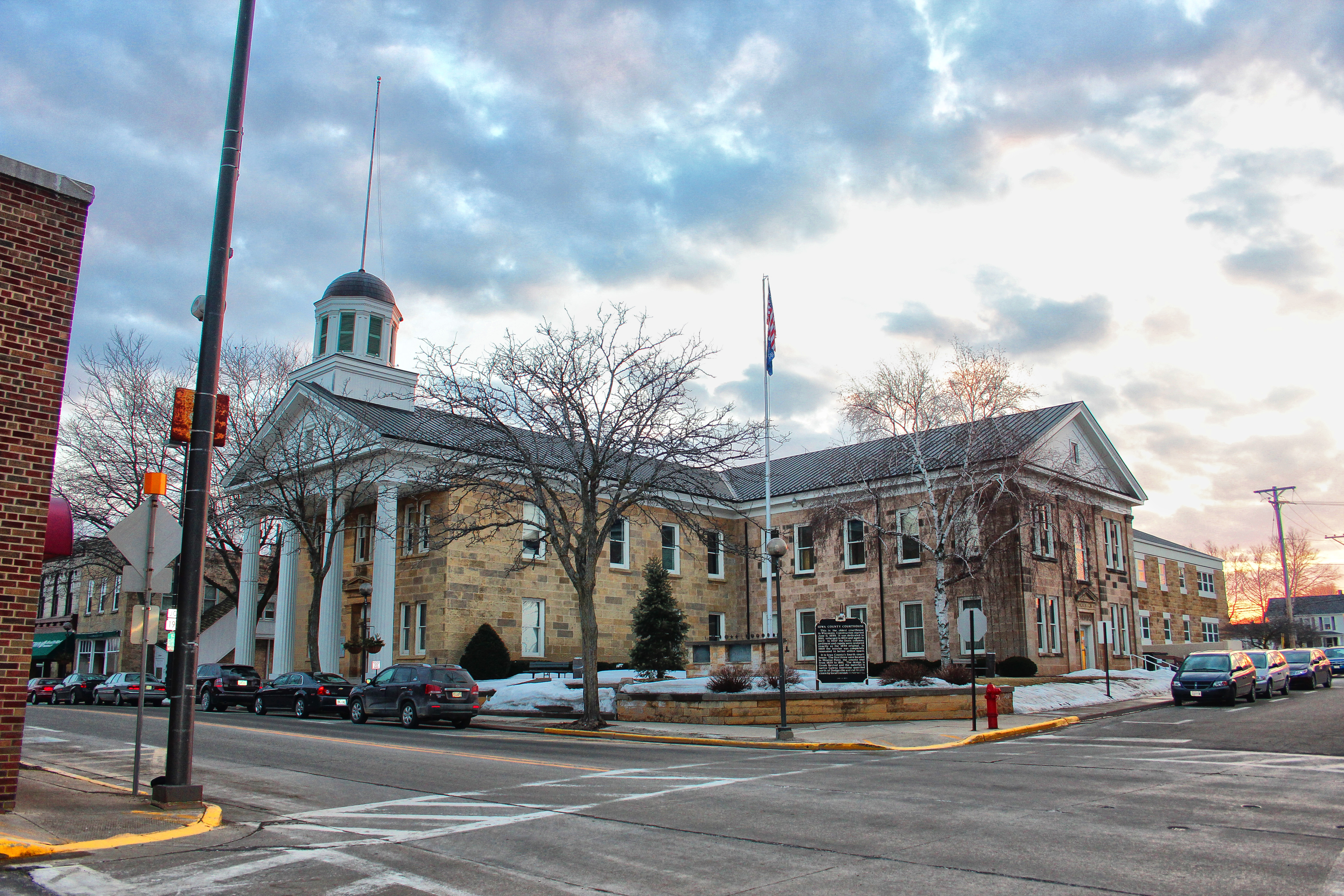
- Courthouse in 2013

- Location within Wisconsin Location within the United States
- Interactive map showing the location of Iowa County Courthouse
- Location: SW corner of Iowa and Chapel Sts., Dodgeville, Wisconsin
- Coordinates: 42°57′41″N 90°7′47″W
- Built: 1859
- Architect: Wiesen, Ernest
- Architectural style: Greek Revival
- NRHP reference No.: 72000053
- Added to NRHP: February 1, 1972

The Iowa County Courthouse is a stone courthouse in Dodgeville, Wisconsin. Built by Cornish immigrants in 1859, it is the oldest courthouse still in use in Wisconsin. The building houses the circuit court and government offices of Iowa County, Wisconsin. It was listed on the National Register of Historic Places in 1972. According to its 1971 NRHP nomination, its stonework is "superb".

== History ==
The present courthouse is the fourth to serve Iowa County. Three earlier courthouses had stood in Mineral Point. In a November 1858 election, a majority of voters chose to move the county seat to Dodgeville. Work to build the courthouse began in early 1859, with stonework by newly immigrated workmen from Cornwall, England. In the meantime, supporters of Mineral Point brought a lawsuit to contest its loss of the county seat. With the building still under construction on July 11, 1859, the Wisconsin Supreme Court annulled the 1858 county seat referendum on the grounds that insufficient notice had been published. The county continued with the construction of the new building, but its status was uncertain until April 2, 1861, when a new election confirmed voters' choice to make Dodgeville the county seat. The Dodgeville courthouse was quickly put to use, holding a county board meeting on April 23 and a Union Civil War rally on May 2, 1861.

The courthouse has undergone several modifications since its construction. The county built additions to the west in 1894 and to the north in 1927 using stone that closely matched the original structure. Owing to deterioration in the woodwork, the front portico was rebuilt in 1937 as a replica of the original. The interior underwent extensive renovation in 1969. The county expanded again with a new annex to the west in 1995.

== Architecture ==
The courthouse is a two-story Greek Revival temple-style building. It is notable as a unique manifestation of otherwise standard Greek Revival architecture using locally available materials. Local resident Ernest Wiesen drew the plans for the courthouse, likely copying elements from the 1854 book The Modern Architect by Edward Shaw. The exterior walls consist of buff-colored local Galena limestone and the entrances are framed with carved stone pilasters and pediments. The front facade features a portico of four wooden doric columns, which are tilted slightly inward to create an impression of solidity. The roof is surmounted with a small eight-sided cupola and dome.
