= WZRK (AM) =

Active rock radio station in Dodgeville, Wisconsin

- Dodgeville, Wisconsin; United States
- Broadcast area: Dodgeville/Madison
- Frequency: 810 kHz
- Branding: 96.9 Z Rock

Programming
- Format: Active rock

Ownership
- Owner: Dodge Point Broadcasting Company
- Sister stations: WDMP-FM

History
- First air date: November 1, 1967 (as WDMP)
- Former call signs: WDMP (1968–2018)

Technical information
- Licensing authority: FCC
- Facility ID: 17054
- Class: D
- Power: 250 watts day; 10 watts night
- Transmitter coordinates: 42°55′10.00″N 90°8′6.00″W
- Translator: 96.9 W245DE (Dodgeville)

Links
- Public license information: Public file; LMS
- Webcast: Listen Live
- Website: zrock969.com

WZRK (810 kHz, "96.9 Z-Rock") is an AM radio station broadcasting an active rock music format. Licensed to Dodgeville, Wisconsin, United States, the station serves southwest Wisconsin and the West Madison Metropolitan area. The station is currently owned by Dodge Point Broadcasting Company.

On August 9, 2018, the then-WDMP dropped its country simulcast with WDMP-FM and changed its format to active rock, branded as "96.9 Z-Rock" and simulcasting on FM translator W245DE 96.9 FM Dodgeville. The station changed its call sign to WZRK on August 10, 2018.
