= Dodgeville, Wisconsin =

- City
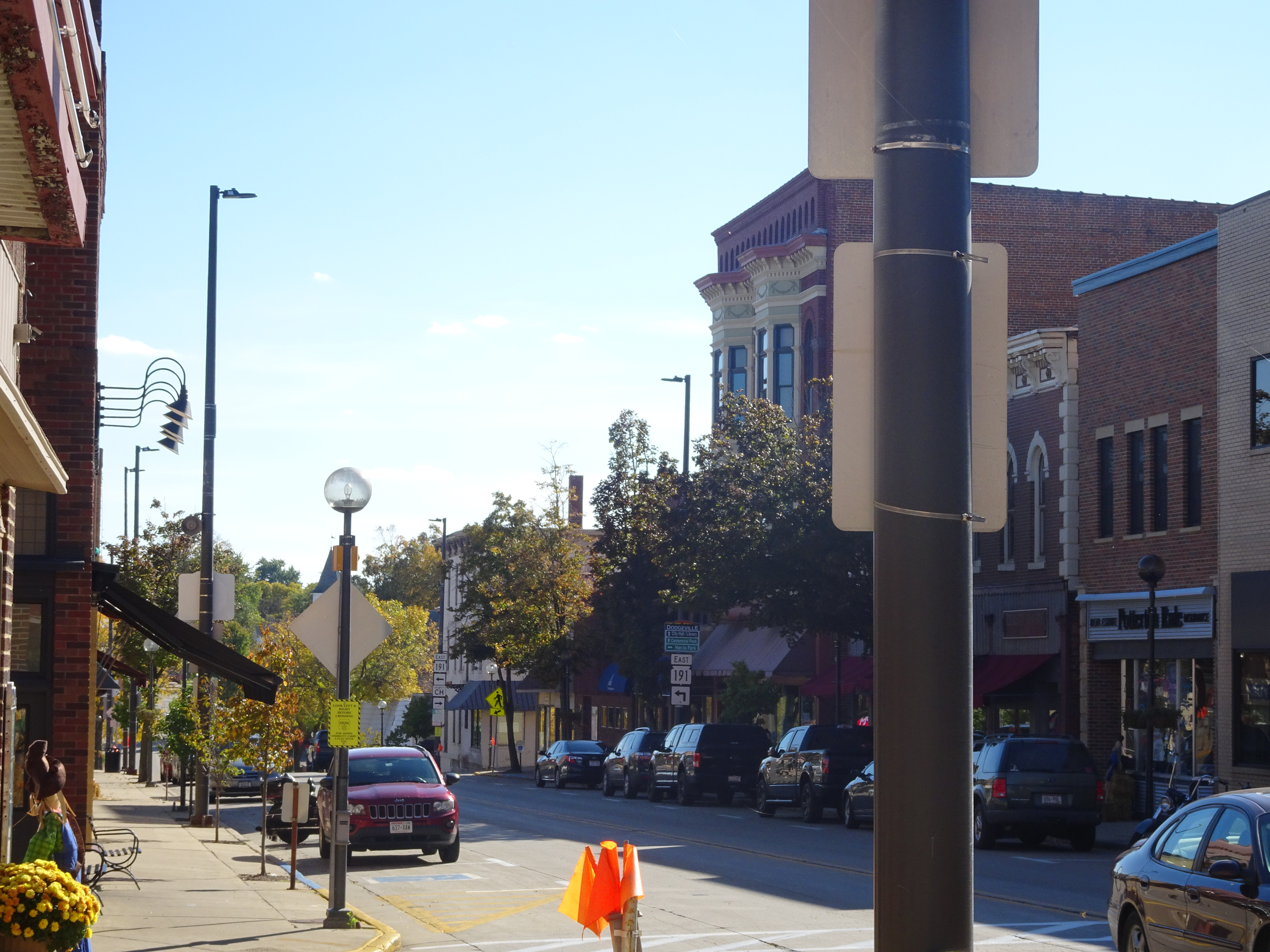
- Downtown Dodgeville

- Location of Dodgeville in Iowa County, Wisconsin.

- Location within Wisconsin Location within the United States
- Coordinates: 42°57′48″N 90°7′52″W
- Country: United States
- State: Wisconsin
- County: Iowa
- Established: 1827
- Founder: Henry Dodge

Government
  - Mayor: Barry N. Hottmann
  - Clerk: Lauree Aulik

Area
  - Total: 4.06 sq mi (10.52 km^{2})
  - Land: 4.06 sq mi (10.52 km^{2})
  - Water: 0 sq mi (0.00 km^{2})
- Elevation: 1,194 ft (364 m)

Population (2020)
  - Total: 4,984
  - Density: 1,215.6/sq mi (469.35/km^{2})
- Time zone: UTC−6 (CDT)
  - Summer (DST): UTC−5 (CST)
- ZIP Code: 53533
- Area code: 608
- FIPS code: 55-20350
- Website: dodgevillewi.gov

Dodgeville is a city in Iowa County, Wisconsin, United States, and its county seat. The population was 4,984 at the 2020 census, making it the county's most populous city. Dodgeville is part of the Madison metropolitan area.

== History ==
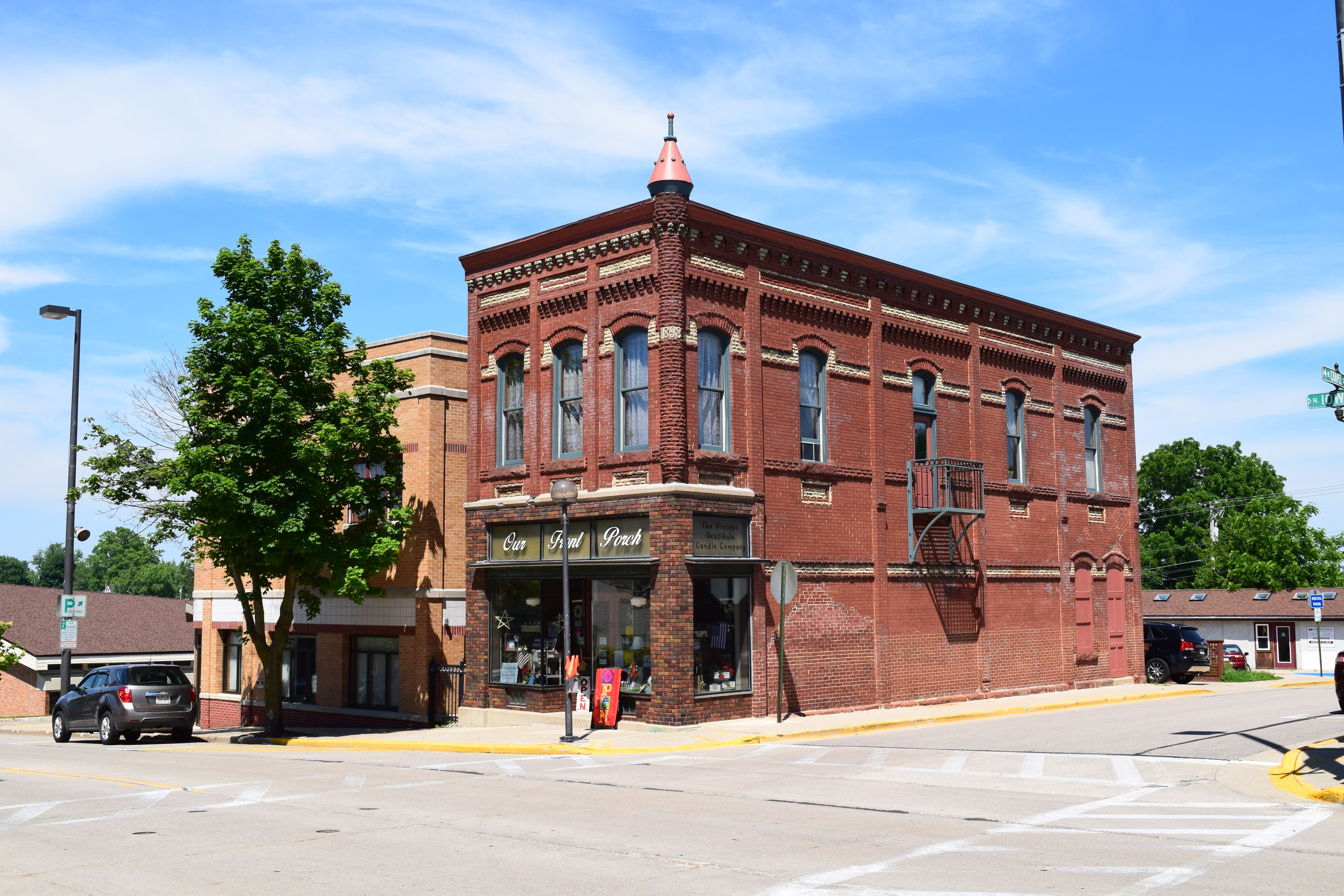
Corner of Iowa and Chapel, Iowa Street Historic District

In 1827, Henry Dodge, his family, and about 40 miners began what would become the city of Dodgeville. Dodge made a pact with the local Winnebago Indian leaders so he could build a cabin and smelter. The original community had three settlements: "Dodgeville", "Dirty Hollow" and "Minersville". A fourth settlement, Moon Spring, near the intersection of the present Highway 18 bypass and Bennett Road flourished until the cholera epidemic in the early 1850s.

Dodgeville, which was named after Dodge, grew slowly during its early years. It was incorporated as a village in the 1840s. Later a small "war" was fought with Mineral Point over which community would become the seat of Iowa County after Lafayette County was created. At the time, Mineral Point was the seat, because it was centrally located in the 'old' Iowa County that stretched from the Wisconsin River in the north south to the Illinois border.

The County seat eventually moved to Dodgeville because of its central location in the 'new' Iowa County. Dodgeville's population grew rapidly, and it became a center for mining and later, dairy product manufacturing and shipping. Miners from England flooded the city, and British and Cornish architecture is still visible in the city today. Dodgeville became the largest city in Wisconsin at the time as well as most of the Midwest north of St. Louis, and west of Cincinnati. The community's boom didn't last long though, and with the decline of mining its population was overtaken by rapidly growing cities like Chicago and Milwaukee.

Several factors led to the decline in importance of mining, including the Black Hawk War, the California Gold Rush, the Civil War, and the emergence of farming, leading to Dodgeville's development as a business and agricultural center. Today the city is most commonly known for being the headquarters for the apparel company Lands' End.

== Geography ==
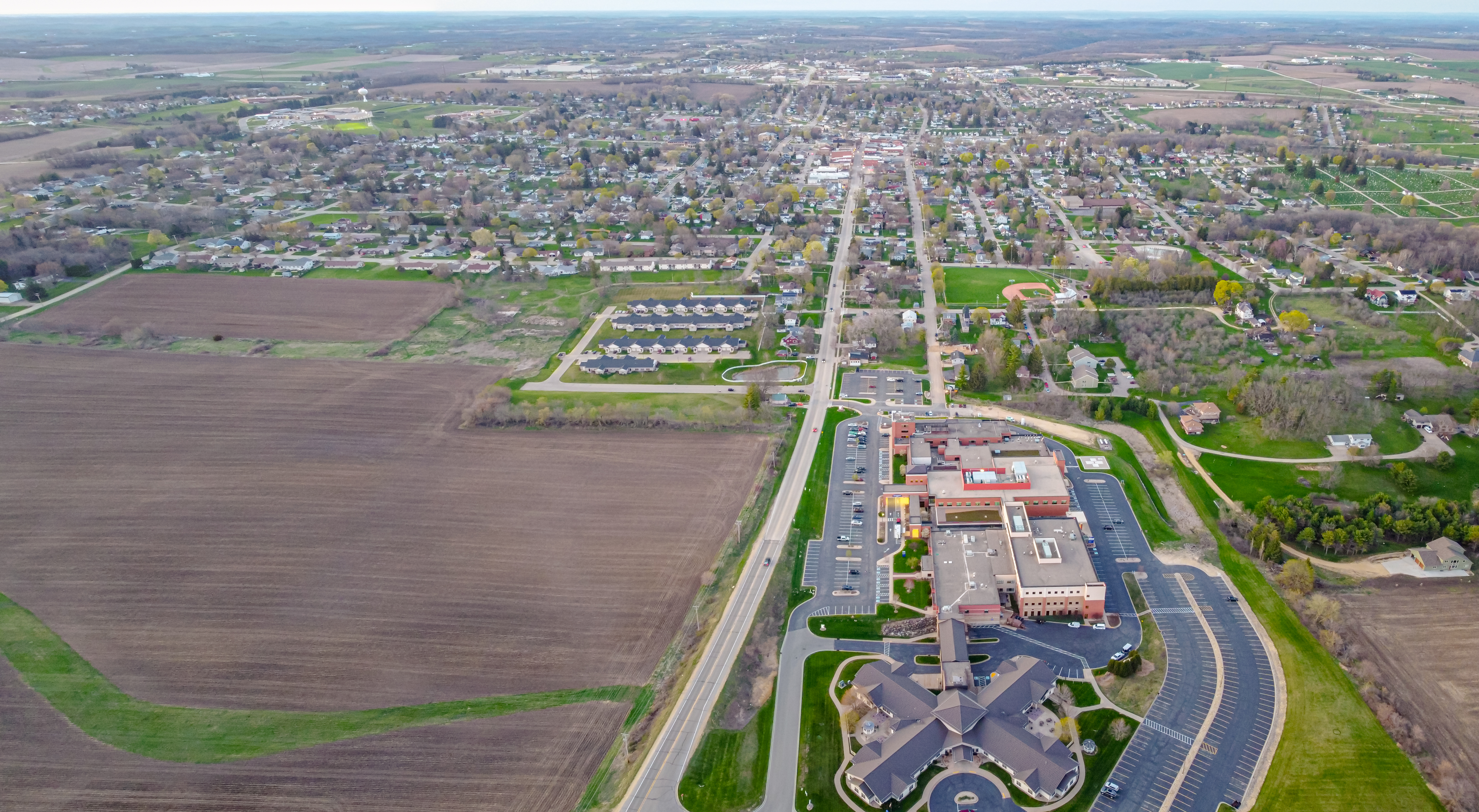
Aerial view of Dodgeville

Dodgeville is located at 42°57′48″N 90°7′52″W (42.963373, -90.131161).

According to the United States Census Bureau, the city has a total area of 4.06 square miles (10.52 km^{2}), all land.

=== Climate ===
According to the Köppen Climate Classification system, Dodgeville has a warm-summer humid continental climate, abbreviated "Dfb" on climate maps. The hottest temperature recorded in Dodgeville was 108 °F (42.2 °C) on July 24, 1901, while the coldest temperature recorded was −33 °F (−36.1 °C) on January 19, 1994.

Climate data for Dodgeville, Wisconsin, 1991–2020 normals, extremes 1896–present
Month	Jan	Feb	Mar	Apr	May	Jun	Jul	Aug	Sep	Oct	Nov	Dec	Year
Record high °F (°C)	58 (14)	70 (21)	83 (28)	93 (34)	93 (34)	100 (38)	108 (42)	101 (38)	97 (36)	91 (33)	73 (23)	67 (19)	108 (42)
Mean maximum °F (°C)	44.7 (7.1)	50.1 (10.1)	66.1 (18.9)	77.7 (25.4)	84.8 (29.3)	89.6 (32.0)	90.8 (32.7)	89.4 (31.9)	86.6 (30.3)	79.6 (26.4)	62.8 (17.1)	49.1 (9.5)	92.6 (33.7)
Mean daily maximum °F (°C)	26.0 (−3.3)	30.6 (−0.8)	42.8 (6.0)	56.5 (13.6)	68.3 (20.2)	77.7 (25.4)	81.4 (27.4)	79.6 (26.4)	72.4 (22.4)	59.3 (15.2)	43.9 (6.6)	31.1 (−0.5)	55.8 (13.2)
Daily mean °F (°C)	17.4 (−8.1)	21.4 (−5.9)	32.9 (0.5)	45.2 (7.3)	56.9 (13.8)	66.8 (19.3)	70.7 (21.5)	68.9 (20.5)	60.9 (16.1)	48.5 (9.2)	35.0 (1.7)	23.4 (−4.8)	45.7 (7.6)
Mean daily minimum °F (°C)	8.9 (−12.8)	12.1 (−11.1)	23.0 (−5.0)	33.9 (1.1)	45.5 (7.5)	55.9 (13.3)	60.1 (15.6)	58.2 (14.6)	49.4 (9.7)	37.6 (3.1)	26.0 (−3.3)	15.6 (−9.1)	35.5 (2.0)
Mean minimum °F (°C)	−12.6 (−24.8)	−7.9 (−22.2)	3.0 (−16.1)	20.3 (−6.5)	31.8 (−0.1)	42.6 (5.9)	49.2 (9.6)	48.3 (9.1)	36.0 (2.2)	24.0 (−4.4)	10.4 (−12.0)	−4.6 (−20.3)	−16.6 (−27.0)
Record low °F (°C)	−33 (−36)	−32 (−36)	−21 (−29)	8 (−13)	24 (−4)	29 (−2)	39 (4)	31 (−1)	18 (−8)	12 (−11)	−12 (−24)	−22 (−30)	−33 (−36)
Average precipitation inches (mm)	1.45 (37)	1.52 (39)	2.30 (58)	3.88 (99)	4.61 (117)	5.73 (146)	4.71 (120)	4.39 (112)	3.66 (93)	3.08 (78)	2.47 (63)	1.83 (46)	39.63 (1,008)
Average snowfall inches (cm)	10.3 (26)	10.6 (27)	5.9 (15)	1.5 (3.8)	0.0 (0.0)	0.0 (0.0)	0.0 (0.0)	0.0 (0.0)	0.0 (0.0)	0.6 (1.5)	1.9 (4.8)	10.3 (26)	41.1 (104.1)
Average precipitation days (≥ 0.01 in)	8.6	8.0	8.6	11.5	12.6	11.8	9.8	9.1	9.2	9.6	8.2	8.8	115.8
Average snowy days (≥ 0.1 in)	5.6	5.2	2.5	0.9	0.1	0.0	0.0	0.0	0.0	0.2	1.2	5.1	20.8
Source 1: NOAA
Source 2: National Weather Service

== Demographics ==
Historical population
Census	Pop.	Note	%±
1860	1,222		—
1870	1,407		15.1%
1880	1,547		10.0%
1890	1,722		11.3%
1900	1,865		8.3%
1910	1,791		−4.0%
1920	1,896		5.9%
1930	1,937		2.2%
1940	2,269		17.1%
1950	2,532		11.6%
1960	2,911		15.0%
1970	3,255		11.8%
1980	3,458		6.2%
1990	3,882		12.3%
2000	4,220		8.7%
2010	4,693		11.2%
2020	4,984		6.2%
U.S. Decennial Census

=== 2020 census ===
As of the census of 2020, the population was 4,984. The population density was 1,227.0 inhabitants per square mile (473.7/km^{2}). There were 2,238 housing units at an average density of 551.0 per square mile (212.7/km^{2}). The racial makeup of the city was 91.8% White, 2.0% Asian, 0.7% Black or African American, 0.3% Native American, 0.6% from other races, and 4.7% from two or more races. Ethnically, the population was 2.1% Hispanic or Latino of any race.

According to the American Community Survey estimates for 2016-2020, the median income for a household in the city was $65,040, and the median income for a family was $90,729. Male full-time workers had a median income of $48,065 versus $42,755 for female workers. The per capita income for the city was $32,599. About 2.0% of families and 8.3% of the population were below the poverty line, including 11.3% of those age 65 or over. Of the population age 25 and over, 96.9% were high school graduates or higher and 22.3% had a bachelor's degree or higher.

=== 2010 census ===
As of the census of 2010, there were 4,693 people, 1,965 households, and 1,229 families residing in the city. The population density was 1,206.4 inhabitants per square mile (465.8/km^{2}). There were 2,117 housing units at an average density of 544.2 per square mile (210.1/km^{2}). The racial makeup of the city was 97.3% White, 0.5% African American, 0.3% Native American, 1.0% Asian, 0.2% from other races, and 0.8% from two or more races. Hispanic or Latino of any race were 1.8% of the population.

There were 1,965 households, of which 33.3% had children under the age of 18 living with them, 47.0% were married couples living together, 11.2% had a female householder with no husband present, 4.4% had a male householder with no wife present, and 37.5% were non-families. 32.8% of all households were made up of individuals, and 13.8% had someone living alone who was 65 years of age or older. The average household size was 2.35 and the average family size was 2.98.

The median age in the city was 37.8 years. 26.8% of residents were under the age of 18; 6.1% were between the ages of 18 and 24; 27.3% were from 25 to 44; 25.5% were from 45 to 64; and 14.3% were 65 years of age or older. The gender makeup of the city was 47.5% male and 52.5% female.

=== 2000 census ===
As of the census of 2000, there were 4,220 people, 1,751 households, and 1,131 families residing in the city. The population density was 1,178.5 people per square mile (455.1/km^{2}). There were 1,831 housing units at an average density of 511.3 per square mile (197.5/km^{2}). The racial makeup of the city was 98.06% White, 0.36% Black or African American, 0.02% Native American, 0.59% Asian, 0.05% Pacific Islander, 0.17% from other races, and 0.76% from two or more races. 0.43% of the population were Hispanic or Latino of any race.

There were 1,751 households, of which 33.1% had children under the age of 18 living with them, 51.5% were married couples living together, 10.5% had a female householder with no husband present, and 35.4% were non-families. 30.9% of all households were made up of individuals, and 13.2% had someone living alone who was 65 years of age or older. The average household size was 2.34, and the average family size was 2.96.

In the city, the population was spread out, with 25.8% under the age of 18, 6.3% from 18 to 24, 31.5% from 25 to 44, 19.9% from 45 to 64, and 16.5% who were 65 years of age or older. The median age was 37 years. For every 100 females, there were 89.3 males. For every 100 females age 18 and over, there were 85.0 males

The median income for a household in the city was $41,615, and the median income for a family was $50,755. Males had a median income of $32,738 versus $24,047 for females. The per capita income for the city was $20,962. About 2.7% of families and 5.3% of the population were below the poverty line, including 4.3% of those under age 18 and 16.0% of those age 65 or over.

== Economy ==
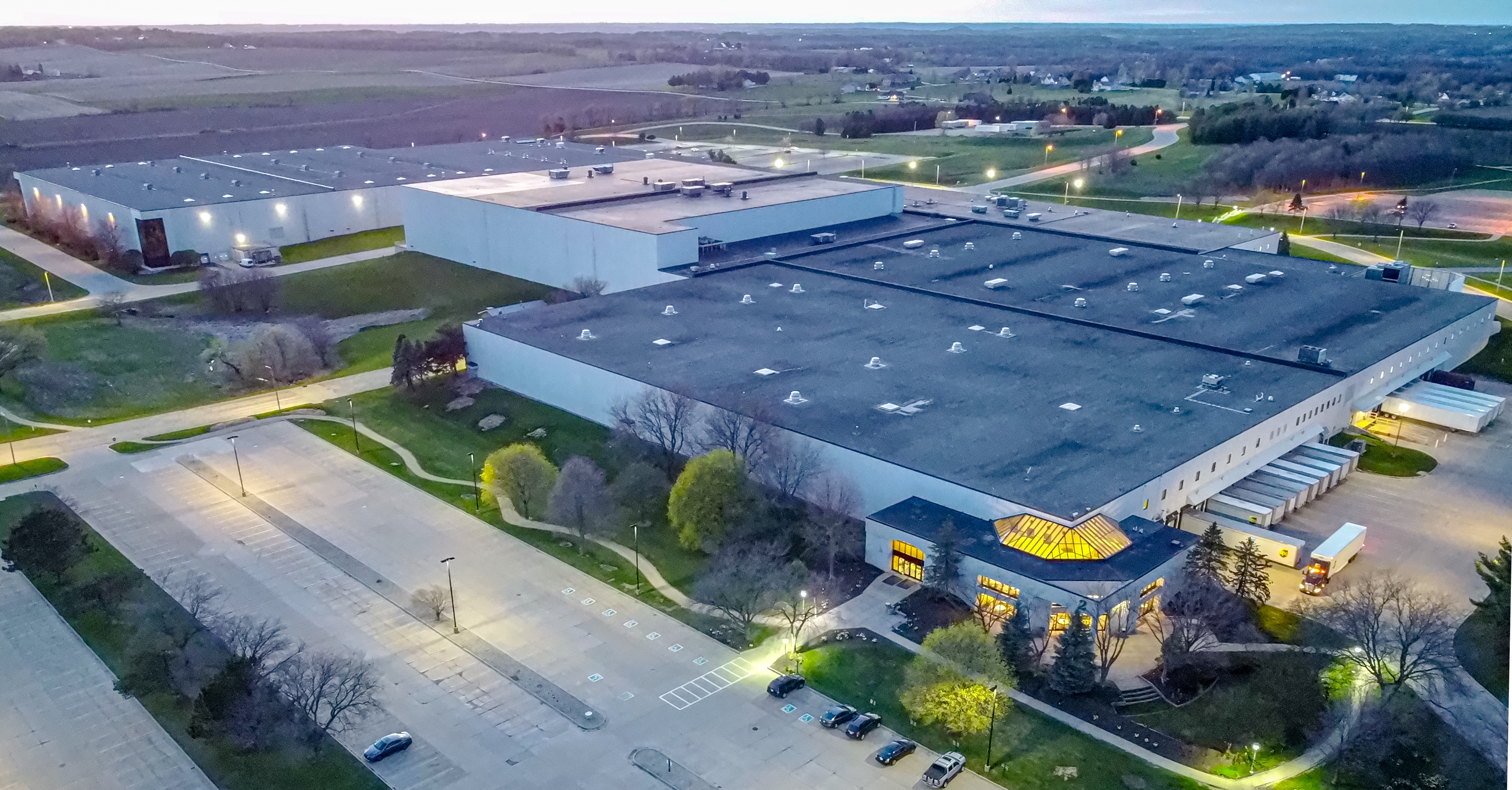
Lands' End corporate office

Dodgeville was designated a National Mainstreet Program in 1991.

As the seat of an agricultural county, the city's economy provides services for farmers.

Dodgeville is home to the corporate headquarters of Lands' End, a global catalog and internet merchant of apparel and home products. Lands' End employs 6,000 people in its Dodgeville headquarters.

== Arts and culture ==
=== Events ===
Every summer, Dodgeville holds a "Farmer Appreciation Day" featuring a parade down Dodgeville's Iowa Street and a festival in Harris Park. The event, which takes place the third weekend of July, serves as a way for the people of Dodgeville to show appreciation for the farmers who are the backbone of the local economy. The parade features farming implements, fire trucks and ambulances, and floats constructed by area churches and businesses. The festival features cold BBQ sandwiches, music, rides, tractor pulls, and fireworks.

=== Historical sites ===
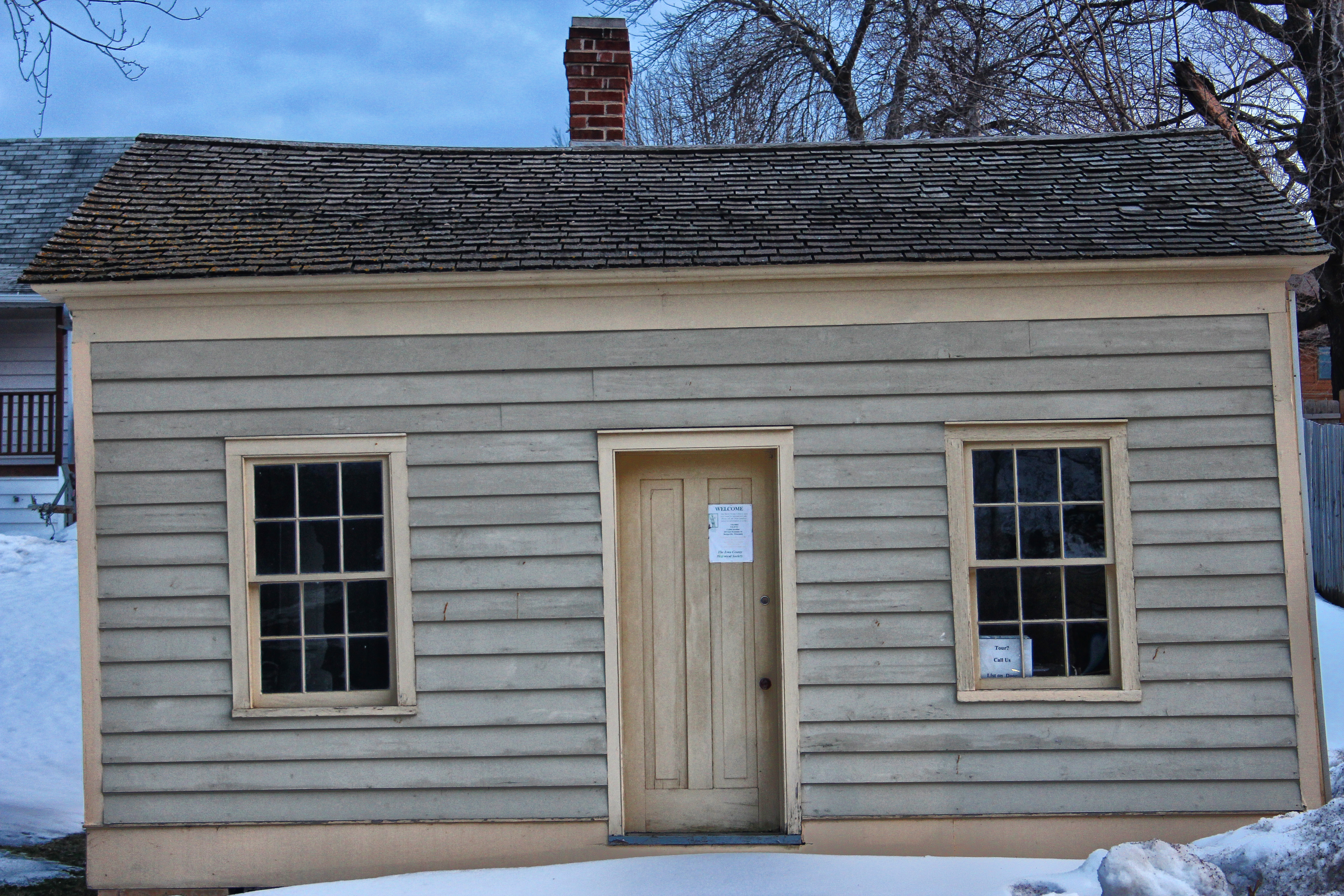
Dodge Mining Camp Cabin

The Iowa County Courthouse was dedicated in 1859 and continues to serve as the seat of government in Iowa County, functioning as the oldest courthouse in the state. Several additions to the building have been added over the years, in keeping with the historic and classic architectural style of the original structure.

The Dodge Mining Camp Cabin, originally built circa 1828, is representative of the housing constructed by lead diggers at "Dodge's Camp" - the original lead mining claim of Colonel Henry Dodge and family. The Iowa County Historical Society restored the cabin and moved it to its present location on Fountain Street. It is one of Wisconsin's oldest structures and may be the last extant mining camp cabin from the days of the "Lead Rush" of 1827–1830.

Spang's Opera House was built in the early stages of Dodgeville's development. It was demolished during the 1990s to build a convenience store at the intersections of Highway 23—Bequette, North and Spring Streets. The structure's foundation walls were among the oldest stone structures in Dodgeville, dating from the 1840s. In the 1940s the lower level of the opera house was the first location of the Iowa County Dairy Cooperative, before the coop built a structure near the intersection of Hwy. 191 and Section Line Road on the east side of Dodgeville. At one time the Opera House was in the center of a thriving business area, with several hotels in the immediate vicinity: The Cocking Hotel, the Wisconsin House, and the Western Hotel, all on North Main Street. Today, only the Western Hotel survives, and is now rental units.

Begun in 1928, construction was completed on the Dodgeville Masonic Temple in 1930, with the building dedicated on May 13 of that year. This structure is among the last Masonic Temples built in Wisconsin that is still functioning as a Masonic Lodge. Dodgeville Lodge #119 dates to 1859. Today, the structure also houses a Masonic Museum for the Southwestern Wisconsin region. The Dodgeville Primitive Methodist Church stood on this site until the present Plymouth Congregational UCC structure was built in 1907.

Downtown Dodgeville's historic buildings stretch six blocks along north and south Iowa Street. Much of the downtown is included in the Iowa Street Historic District.

The Jones and Owens family, prominent merchants in Dodgeville constructed a Mausoleum in the East Cemetery on East Division Street where several of the family members are entombed. Family mausoleums were quite common in larger urban areas in the late 19th century, but less common in smaller communities. The Jones and Owens mercantile business building is located on South Iowa Street and currently houses the Quality Bakery (since 1946), among other businesses. The Jones family mansion is located on North Main Street across from Plymouth UCC and the Owens family mansion is located on South Iowa Street near the intersection with Valley Street. Both structures are private dwellings.

Built in 1878, the David J. and Maggie Jones House was originally built for J.C. Hocking and was later purchased by David J. Jones.

== Parks and recreation ==
Military Ridge State Trail is a 40-mile (64 km) trail that runs from Dodgeville to Fitchburg, Wisconsin following the former Chicago and Northwestern Railroad paths (MRT). It is used for hiking, bicycling, snowmobiling, and cross-country skiing. The original military road from Fort Howard in Green Bay to Fort Crawford in Prairie du Chien followed much of the same corridor in the 1820s through the 1840s and was the primary land route crossing the state.

Governor Dodge State Park is located on Highway 23, about 3 miles (4.8 km) north of Dodgeville. The park's development began in the late 1940s, followed by the development of Cox Hollow Lake in the 1950s. The park is in the upper reaches of the Twin Parks watershed, a major soil and water conservation project in the area of the Lower Wisconsin River watershed.

== Government ==
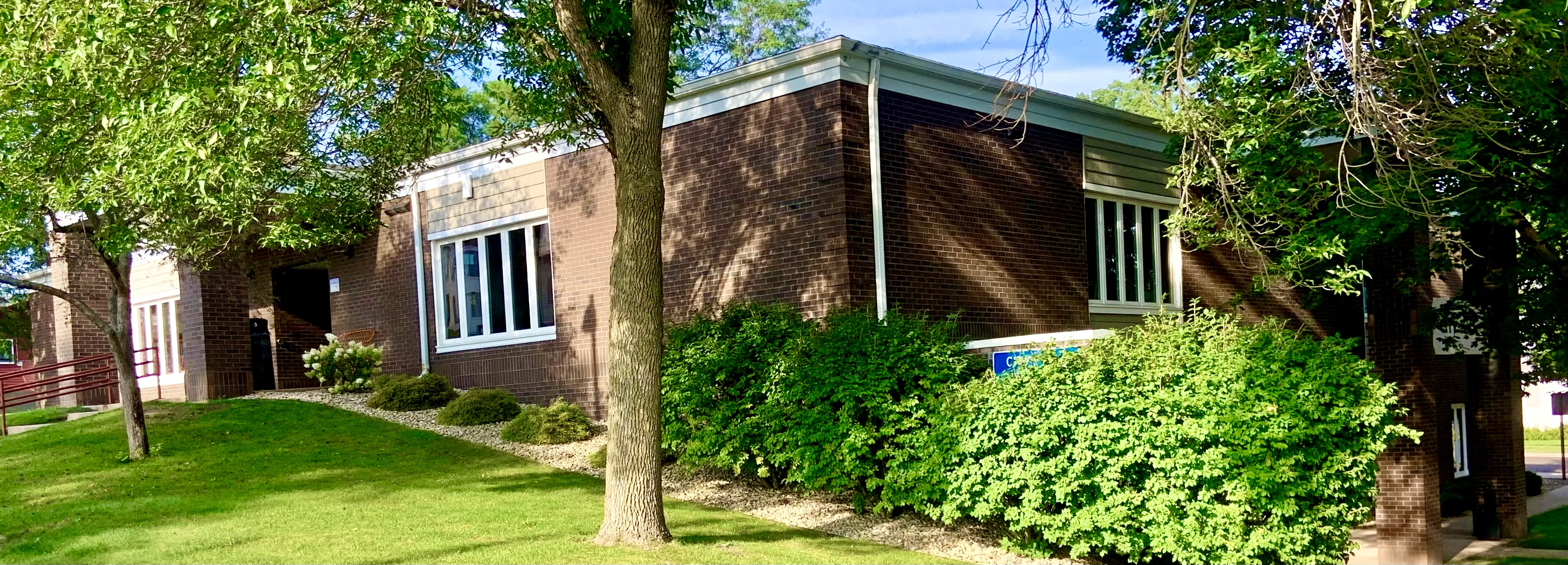
City Hall

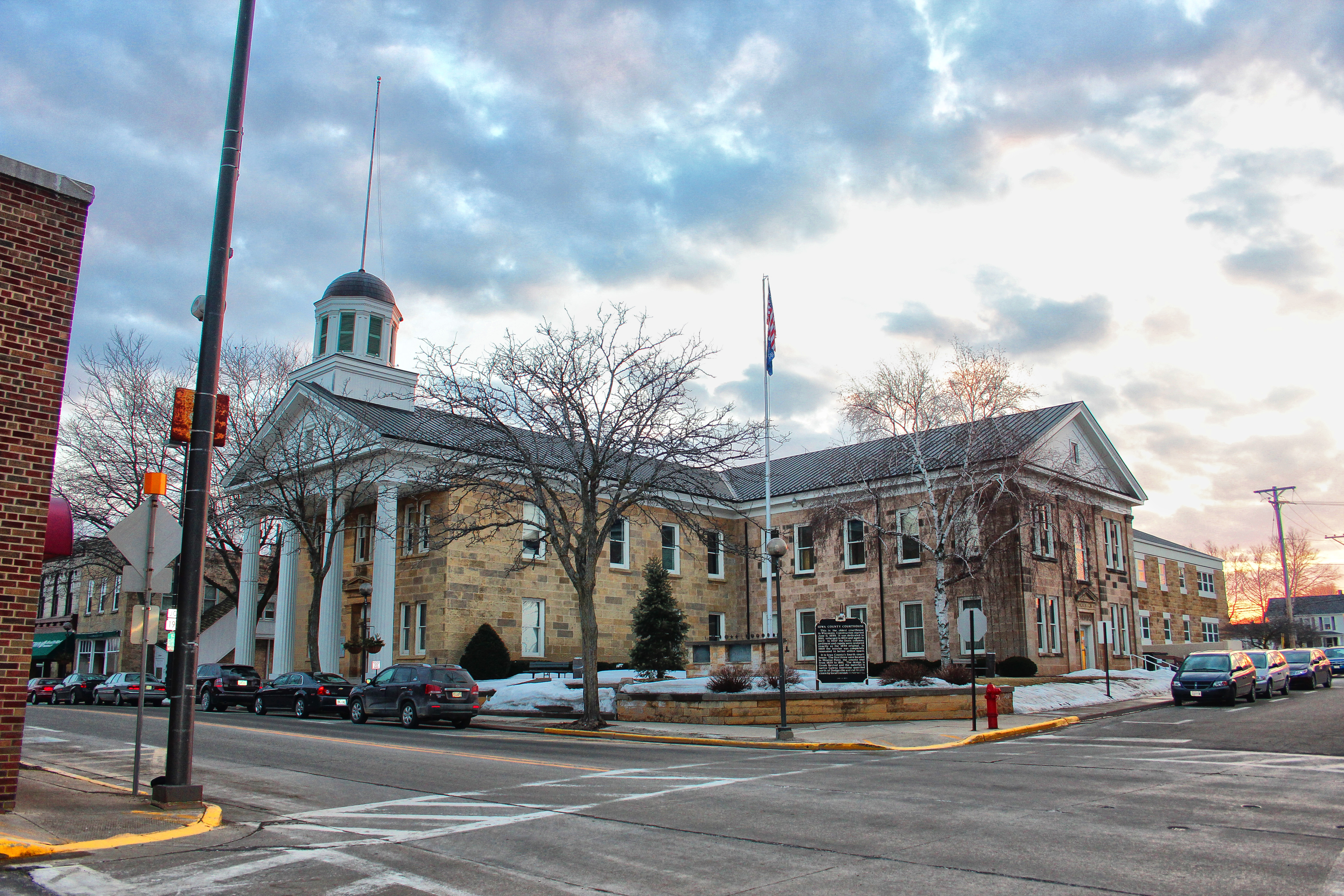
Iowa County Courthouse

The foundations for the Iowa County Courthouse located at 222 North Iowa Street were laid in 1859, making it the state's oldest continuously active courthouse.

The mayor of Dodgeville is Barry N. Hottmann.

== Education ==
The Dodgeville School District serves students from Dodgeville and the village of Ridgeway and comprises three schools - one elementary school, one middle school, and one high school. The elementary school covers pre-K through 5th grade. The middle school serves grades 6 through 8, and the high school 9 through 12.

St. Joseph's Catholic School serves students in Kindergarten through 8th grade.

In the metropolitan building downtown, SWATC adult education classes are offered.

== Media ==
Dodgeville's weekly newspaper is the Dodgeville Chronicle, published every Wednesday. With a circulation of about 5,300, the newspaper serves Dodgeville and surrounding communities. Dodgeville is also served by the Wisconsin State Journal, published in Madison, and the Dubuque Telegraph Herald, Milwaukee Journal Sentinel, and Chicago Tribune. Dodgeville is home to WDMP-FM 99.3 offering a full service country format and WZRK 810 AM and 96.9 FM offering an active rock format, Dodgeville is also served locally by Wisconsin Public Radio transmitter WHHI 91.3 licensed to nearby Highland. Dodgeville is a part of the larger Madison radio and television market with Madison-based broadcasters available over the air and on cable, satellite and OTT services.

== Transportation ==
=== Airports ===
The Dodgeville Municipal Airport, built in 1967, was originally known as the Governor Dodge Quinn Airport. Closed in 1989, it reopened as the Southwind Airport, a private airport, in 2002.

=== Bus service ===
The Aging & Disability Resource Center (ADRC) has a special needs van that serves Iowa County. The bus is available on Tuesdays for people wanting to travel around Dodgeville. Residents over the age of 60 or individuals with disabilities may use the Iowa County Aging & Disability Resource Center Volunteer Driver Escort program for non-emergency medical purposes. The Iowa County Taxi serves Dodgeville on Wednesdays and Fridays and Lamers Bus provides transportation from Green Bay to Dubuque, stopping in downtown Dodgeville.

=== Highways ===
Dodgeville Expressway, U.S. Route 151 (US 151), US 18, and Wisconsin Highway 23 travel through the city.

=== Railroads ===
Dodgeville no longer has rail service, but was once served by both the Chicago and Northwestern and the Illinois Central Railroads. The former Illinois Central freight depot still stands in downtown Dodgeville. The former C&NW passenger depot was relocated from North Dodgeville to the former Don Q Inn Supper Club and Motel north of Dodgeville in the 1970s. Dodgeville was the northernmost terminus for an Illinois Central line from Freeport, Illinois. The C&NW line extended from Madison to Dodgeville and then to points west and south, with its terminus in Galena. The Illinois Central line to Dodgeville was removed in February 1942 and the rails were used in the construction of the Battleship Wisconsin, which was commissioned during World War II and served into the Vietnam era.

== Healthcare ==
In 1974, St. Joseph's Hospital and Dodgeville General Hospital merged to form Memorial Hospital. In 2001, Memorial Hospital changed its name to Upland Hills Health Center. Later other structures were added to the hospital, which were eventually demolished to build the much larger existing Upland Hills Health Center. The center now comprises a clinic, rehabilitation center, nursing home, and hospital.

== Sister city ==
- Oakham, Rutland, United Kingdom

== Notable people ==
- Glenn A. Abbey, U.S. diplomat
- Melancthon J. Briggs, Wisconsin State Assembly
- Henry Dodge, first territorial governor of Wisconsin for whom Dodgeville was named
- William D. Dyke, mayor of Madison and judge
- Thomas Evans, Wisconsin State Assembly
- Homer Fieldhouse, landscape architect
- Francis Gehon, member of the Iowa Territorial Legislature
- Bradley M. Glass, Illinois state legislator and lawyer
- Archie Hahn, Gold medal Olympic sprinter in the 1904 and 1906 Olympics
- Steve Hilgenberg, Wisconsin State Assembly
- Thomas Jenkins, Wisconsin State Assembly
- Roy C. Smelker, Wisconsin State Assembly
- Joel Whitman, Wisconsin State Senator
- Platt Whitman, Wisconsin State Assembly
- John "Weenie" Wilson, Hall of Fame football, basketball, and baseball coach
