= List of mayors of Madison, Wisconsin =

This is a list of mayors of Madison, Wisconsin.

== Village presidents ==
President	Tenure
Thomas W. Sutherland	1846
Alexander L. Collins	1847–1849
William N. Seymour (1808–1886)	1850
Simeon Mills	1851
Chauncey Abbott	1852
Horace A. Tenney	1853
Simeon Mills	1854
Peter Van Bergen (1809–1879)	1855

== Mayors ==
No.	Image	Mayor	Sworn In	Left office
1		Jairus C. Fairchild	1856	1856
2		Augustus A. Bird	1857	1857
3		George Baldwin Smith	1858	1860
4		Levi Baker Vilas	1861	1861
5		William T. Leitch	1862	1864
6		Elisha W. Keyes	1865	1866
7		Alden Sprague Sanborn	1867	1868
8		David Atwood	1868	1868
9		Andrew Proudfit	1869	1870
10		James Barton Bowen	1871	1871
11		James L. Hill	1872	1872
12		Jared Comstock Gregory	1873	1873
13		Silas U. Pinney	1874	1875
14		John N. Jones (1817–1898)	1876	1876
15		Harlow S. Orton	1877	1877
16		George Baldwin Smith	1878	1878
17		John R. Baltzell	1879	1879
18		Philip L. Spooner, Jr.	1880	1880
19		James Conklin	1881	1883
20		Breese J. Stevens	1884	1884
21		Hiram N. Moulton	1885	1885
22		Elisha W. Keyes	1886	1886
23		James Conklin	1887	1887
24		Moses Ransom Doyon	1888	1889
25		Robert McKee Bashford	1890	1890
26		William H. Rogers	1891	1892
27		John H. Corscot	1893	1894
28		Jabe B. Alford	1895	1895
29		Albert A. Dye	1896	1896
30		Mathias J. Hoven	1897	1897
31		Charles Elbert Whelan	1898	1898
32		Mathias J. Hoven	1899	1900
33		Storm Bull	1901	1901
34		John W. Groves	1902	1903
35		William Dexter Curtis (D.)	1904	1905
36		Joseph C. Schubert (D.)	1906	1911
37		John B. Heim (D.)	1912	1913
38		Adolph H. Kayser	1914	1915
39		George C. Sayle (1864–1951)	1916	1919
40		Isaac Milo Kittleson	1920	1925
41		Albert G. Schmedeman	1926	1932
42		James R. Law, Jr.	1932	December 1943
43		Fred Halsey Kraege	December 1943	September 15, 1947 (Note: In a November 1946 referendum, Madison switched to a City Manager form of government, effective after the following April election. On April 15th 1947 Kraege was appointed Acting City Manager until the appointment of a permanent city manager.)
44		Leonard G. Howell (City Manager) (1894–1980)	September 15, 1947	July 31, 1950
45		George J. Forster	August 1, 1950	April 1955 (Note: Forster was appointed Acting City Manager after Howell resigned to become the city manager of Des Moines, Iowa. A November 1950 referendum returned Madison to a Mayor-Aldermanic form of government, and Forster was elected Mayor in the spring election and took office on April 17th 1951)
—		Alfred W. Bareis	April 1955	1956 Interim
46		Ivan A. Nestingen (D.)	1956	1961
—		Harold E. Hanson	1961	1961 Interim
47		Henry Edward Reynolds (R.)	1961	1965
48		Otto Festge (D.) (1921–2007)	April 1965	April 1969
49		William Dyke (R.)	April 1969	April 17, 1973
50		Paul Soglin (D.)	April 17, 1973	April 17, 1979
51		Joel Skornicka (D.)	April 18, 1979	April 17, 1983
52		F. Joseph Sensenbrenner Jr. (D.)	April 17, 1983	April 18, 1989
53		Paul Soglin (D.)	April 18, 1989	April 15, 1997
54		Susan J. M. Bauman (D.)	April 15, 1997	April 22, 2003
55		Dave Cieslewicz (I.)	April 22, 2003	April 19, 2011
56		Paul Soglin (D.)	April 19, 2011	April 16, 2019
57		Satya Rhodes-Conway (D.)	April 16, 2019	present

== See also ==
- Mayoral elections in Madison, Wisconsin
