= Fourth Lake Ridge Historic District =

Historic district in Wisconsin, United States

- U.S. National Register of Historic Places
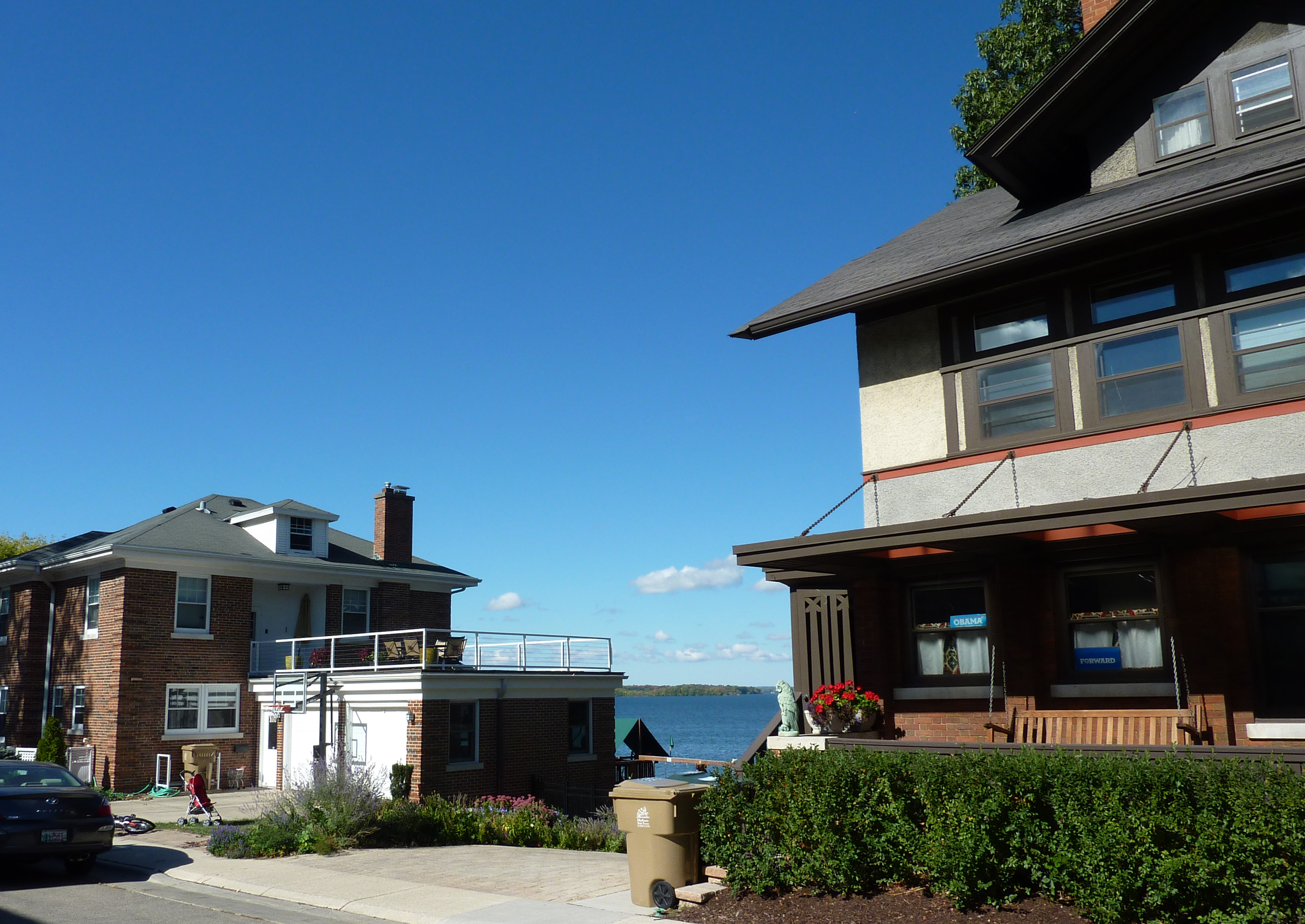
- A portion of the district.
- Location: Roughly bounded by Lake Mendota, N. Brearly, E. Johnson, and N. Franklin Sts., Madison, Wisconsin
- Coordinates: 43.08386°N 89.37885°W
- Area: 20.5 acres (8.3 ha)
- NRHP reference No.: 98000167
- Added to NRHP: February 26, 1998

The Fourth Lake Ridge Historic District is a historic neighborhood on the Lake Mendota side of the isthmus in Madison, Wisconsin, with most homes built from the 1890s to 1930s, but a few as old as the 1850s. In 1998 the historic district was added to the National Register of Historic Places.

Early Madison was sometimes called a city of four hills: Capitol Hill, Mansion Hill, the Third Lake Ridge, and the Fourth Lake Ridge. Fourth Lake was an early name for Lake Mendota, so "Fourth Lake Ridge" refers to the ridge along Lake Mendota in which the historic district is now located, five to ten blocks north of the capitol square.

The ridge was part of James Doty's initial 1836 plat of Madison, but not much development occurred in this area until the 1850s. The blocks nearer the capitol generally filled up earlier, as did the south side of the isthmus where the rail lines ran. But a few large houses (described below) were built on Fourth Lake Ridge in the 1850s, and the lots slowly filled. By 1890 many of the lots along Gorham Street were occupied, with large houses along the lake, mid-sized houses on the other side, and smaller houses on E. Johnson from the 500 to 700 blocks.

In this era before cars, the distance to capitol square had discouraged people from building homes on the Fourth Lake Ridge because it was a bit far to walk to work. But when the blocks around the capitol became full, an eight block walk became more attractive, and when a streetcar line was built in the 1890s from the capitol out along E. Johnson to Baldwin, the area began to fill in with homes of the Queen Anne style that was popular then. Some of the large parcels were further subdivided, like Castle Place, Prospect Place and Washburn Place. Some older homes were replaced with newer ones. Architectural styles shifted to modern styles and period revival styles. Growth began to slow after World War I and was largely done by World War II.

Here are some good examples of different styles of architecture in the district, in roughly the order built.

- The Robert White house at 633 E. Gorham St is a 2-story frame house built in 1856 in Italianate style. Hallmarks of the style are the low-pitched roof and the broad eaves supported by double brackets. White was a carpenter who built the house for his own family, then sold it in 1864 to Denson Worthington, Secretary of the Madison Mutual Insurance Co.

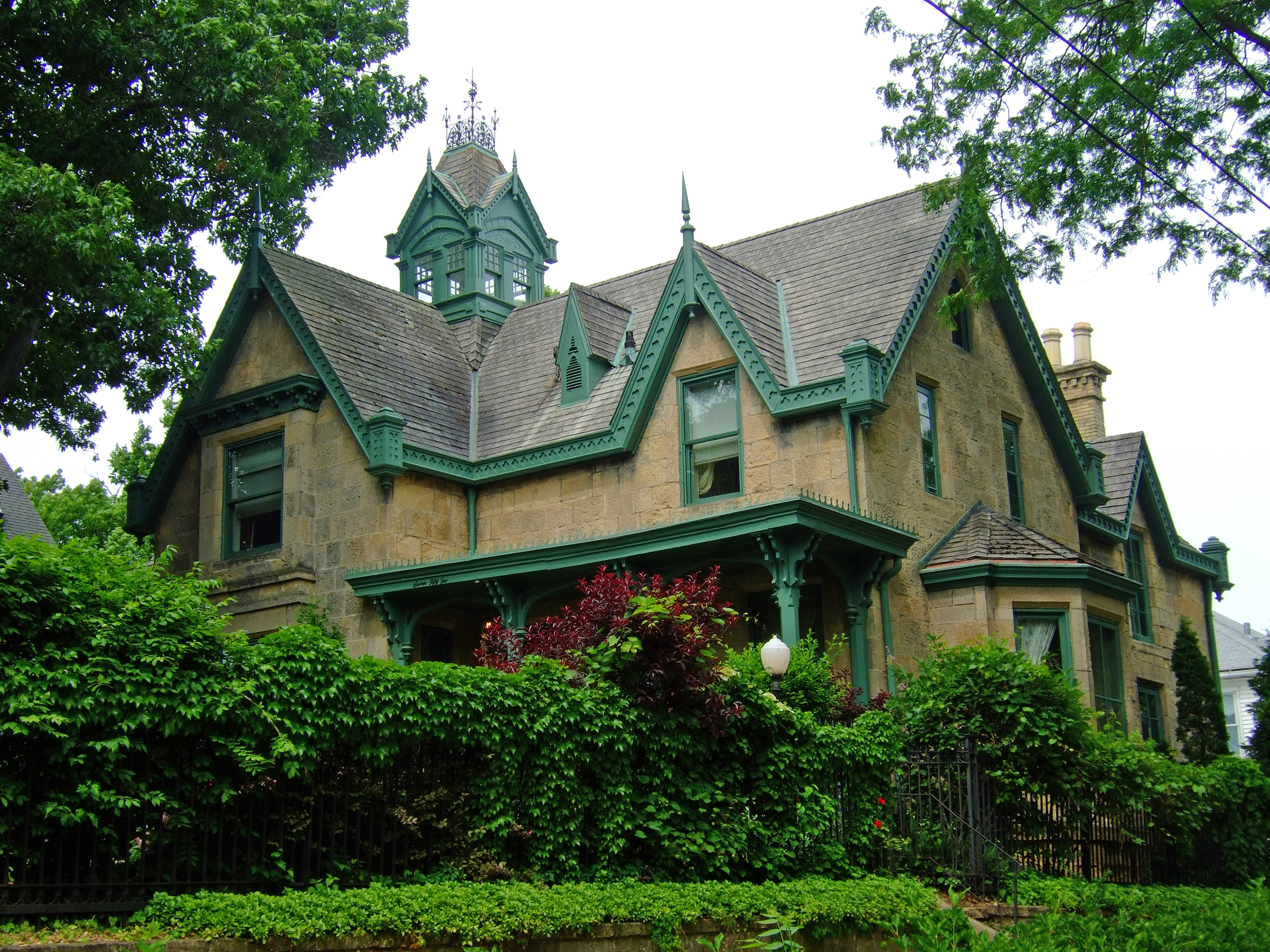
1857 Leitch house, Gothic Revival style

- The William T. Leitch House at 752 E. Gorham was built in 1857, clad in Madison sandstone with a slate roof. The style is Gothic Revival style. Hallmarks of that style in this house are the steeply pitched roofs, the decorated bargeboards, the finials pointing upward, and the cresting. The house is topped by an elaborate cupola. The house was built for William T. Leitch, an English immigrant who ran a wholesale clothing business in New York before coming west to Madison in 1858, where he was elected mayor a few years later and served three terms. Moses Ransom Doyon, a later mayor of Madison, lived in the house from 1881 to 1902. Lawyer and assemblyman Nils P. Haugen lived in the house later, and UW Agricultural Economics professor Asher Hobson later still.
- The main part of the Theodore and Marie Herfurth Sr. house at 703 E. Gorham St was built in 1868 in Italianate style. It was originally a frame structure, but in 1900 Herfurth had most of the house clad in brick. The styling is a bit odd for Italianate, but it still has the typical hip roof, the bracketed eaves, and the porch decoration. Theodore was a German immigrant who ran a carriage-making firm in Madison, a general store in King Street, and later started an insurance agency with his son.
- The Frank Horner house at 715 E Gorham St is an early and intact example of Queen Anne style built in 1891. Hallmarks of the style are the asymmetric front, and the care taken to vary the surface textures. Elaborate Queen Annes often have a corner tower, but not this one. Horner had been a printer for the Wisconsin State Journal, but had switched to managing a bicyclist department by the time he built this house.
- The Frederick and Grace Conover house at 435 N Paterson is a Shingle Style house built in 1901 above Lake Mendota, 2.5 stories tall, with a cross-gambrel roof, with walls clad in shingles, and with Tuscan columns supporting the porch. Frederick was the court reporter for the Wisconsin Supreme Court.

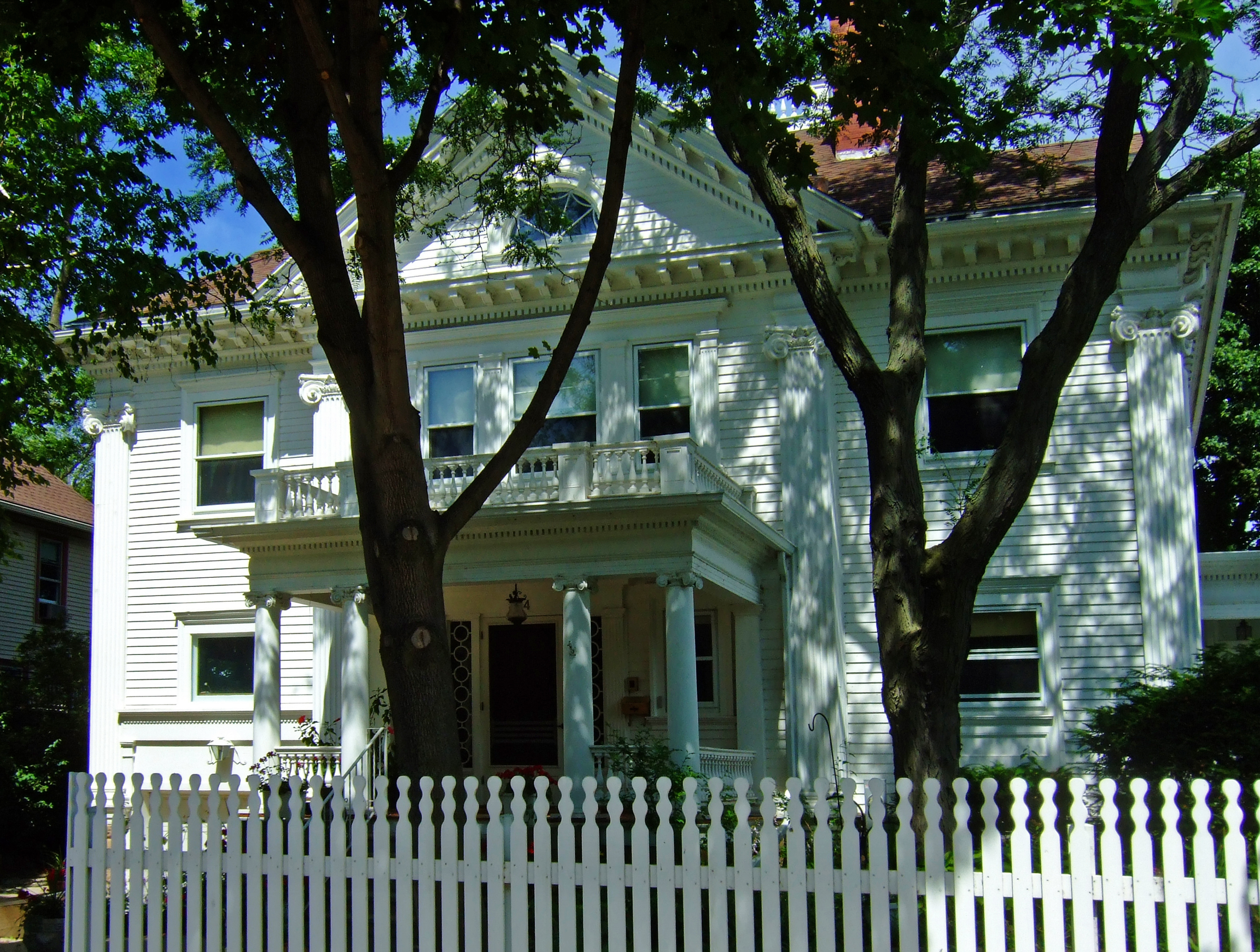
1901 Fay house, Georgian Revival

- The Lucius M. and Marion Fay house at 844 Prospect Place is a Georgian Revival-style house designed by Louis Claude and Edward Stark of Madison and built in 1901. It has the formal symmetry and classical details typical of the style, but is clad in clapboard, whereas most Georgian Revival homes are clad in red brick. The building manages to incorporate most of the classical elements: large pilasters, sidelights on the main entry, balusters, pediment, dentils, and modillions. Lucius Fay was a leader of the Madison Democrat newspaper, a founder of Wisconsin Life Insurance Company, and a real estate developer. He lived in the house only a year before he died.

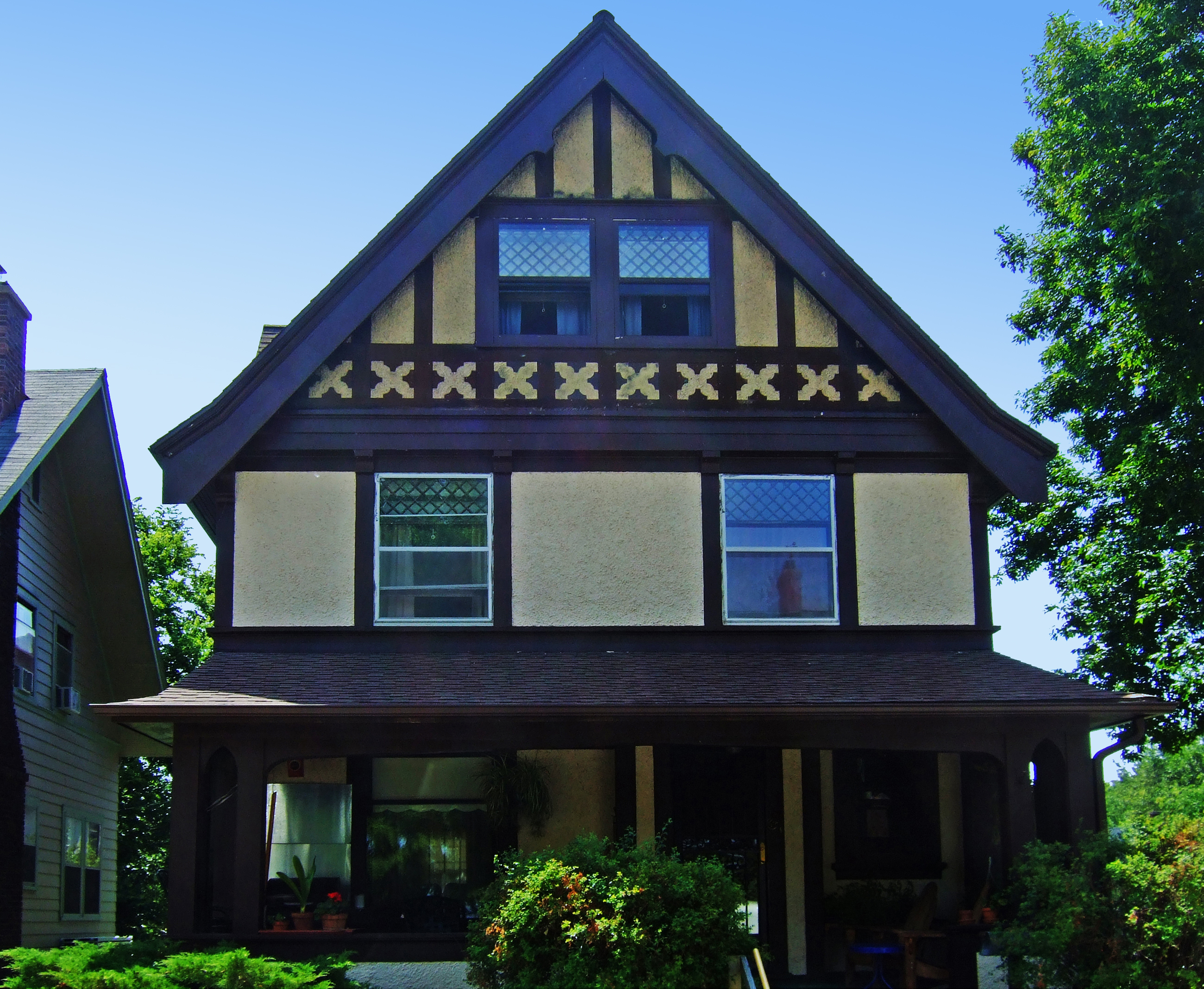
1902 Louis Claude house, Tudor Revival

- Architect Louis Claude built his own house at 831 Prospect Place in 1902 - a modest Tudor Revival home, 2.5 stories with the steep roof and half-timbered stucco typical of the style.

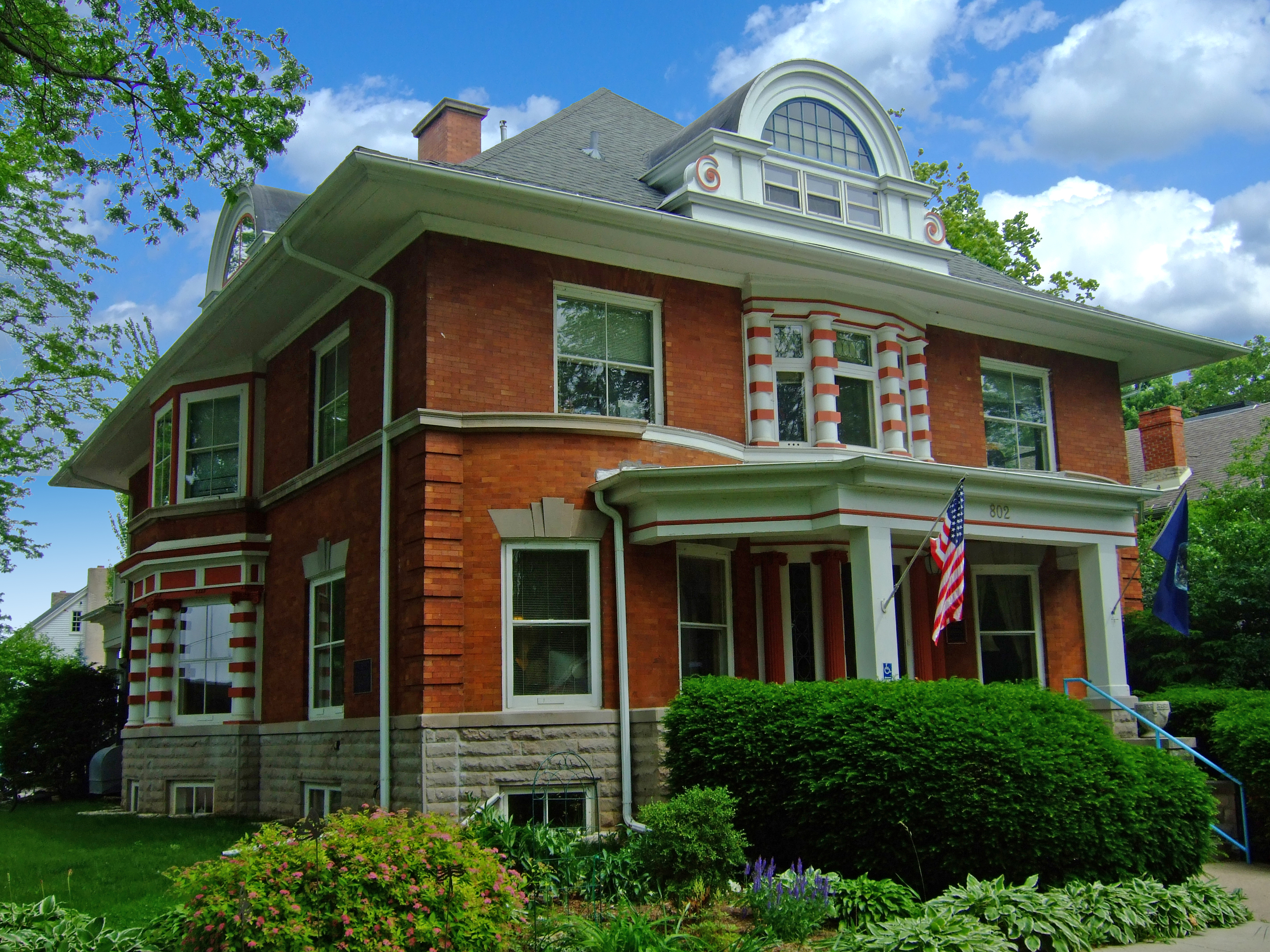
1901 Kayser house, blending Prairie School and classical

- The Adolph and Hedwig Kayser house at 802 E Gorham St was built in 1901, designed by Claude & Starck. The design blends the columns, quoins and symmetry from classical architecture with the broad eaves and horizontal emphasis of Prairie style. The arch-topped dormers are also a modern touch. Adolph owned a lumber company and served two terms as mayor of Madison.
- The Russell and Nettie Hargraves house at 416 Castle Place is a 2-story American Foursquare-style house designed by Claude & Starck and built in 1907. The front porch is supported by four Tuscan columns and the back corner bulges to a 2-story bay. Russell was a mechanical and electrical engineer for Gisholt Machine Company.
- The Thomas G. and Hannah Herfurth Murray house at 515 E. Gorham is a 2-story house built in 1908, as Queen Anne style was going out of fashion. It has the complex roof, bay windows, asymmetric porch, and tall chimneys of Queen Anne style. But the general shape is a 2-story cube, typical of the American Foursquare style that was coming into fashion in 1908, and the Tuscan columns supporting the front porch are drawn from Classical Revival style, which was also growing in popularity. Thomas was vice-president of the Burdick & Murray dry goods store and Hannah was a daughter of the Herfurth grocers up the street.

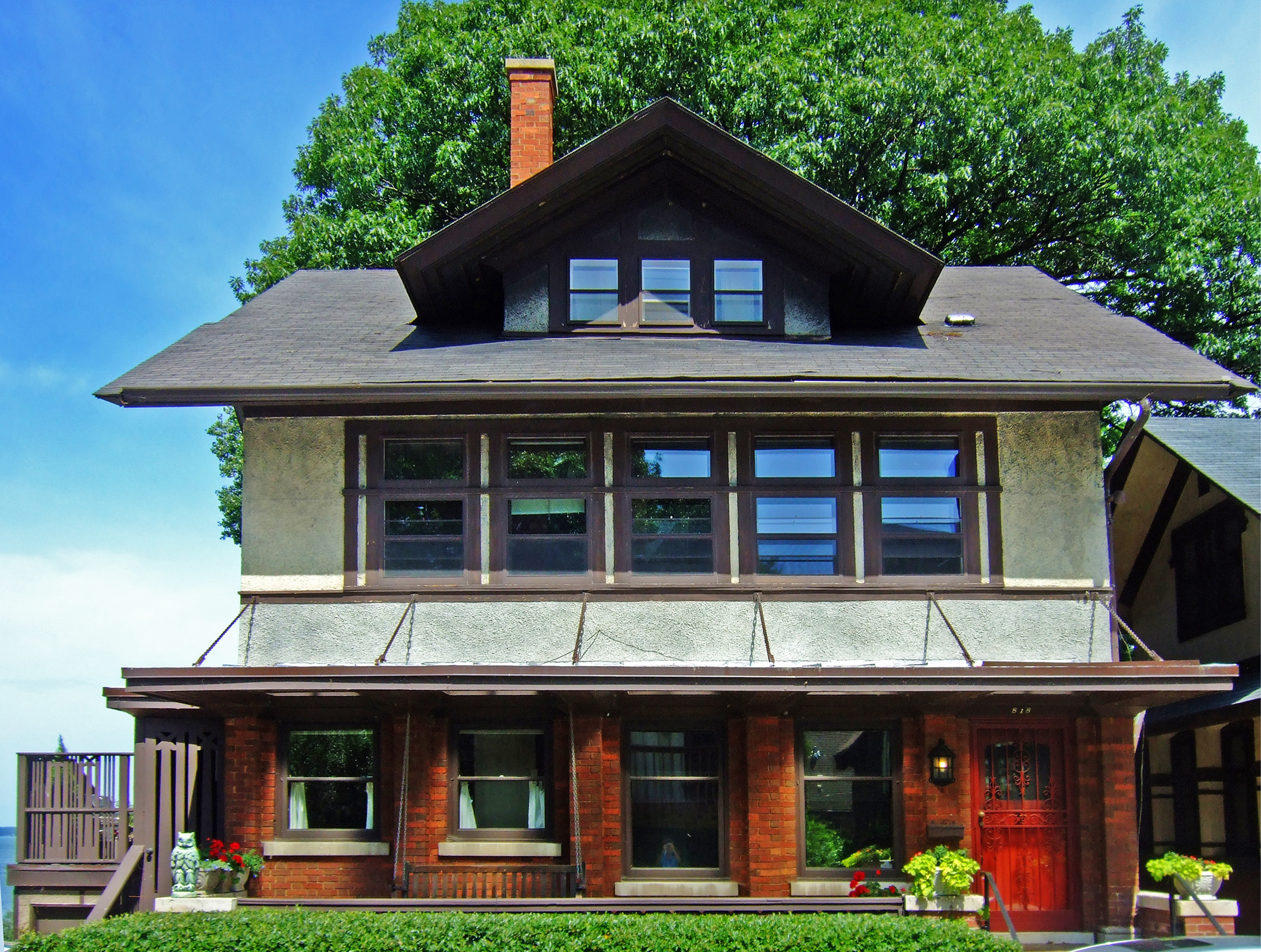
1909 Gary house, Prairie School

- The George and Elizabeth Gary house at 818 Prospect Place is a Prairie School house designed by Claude & Starck and built in 1909. Its front terrace is shaded by an unusual flat canopy suspended by chains.
- The Paul and Luella Warner House at 424 Washburn Place is a Tudor Revival-style home designed by Claude & Starck and built in 1910. The house's street-facing side is dominated by two 2-story oriel/dormers. The first story is clad in horizontal board and batten, the second in stucco and false half-timbering. Paul Warner was a prominent businessman and owned an insurance company. Claude and Starck designed a number of houses like this - to some extent a simplified copy of the 1895 Nathan G. Moore House in Oak Park, Illinois which Frank Lloyd Wright designed.
- The bungalow at 416 Russell Walk was built in 1911 - one of four built when Frank Hall subdivided a lot after moving his own house across the street to 842 Prospect Place. All four houses were bungalows designed by Cora Tuttle, the only known woman to design houses in Madison before the end of WWI. All are modest, rectangular, 1.5 stories, with dormers and exposed rafter tails - typical of the style. To fit four houses in one lot, Hall omitted garages and added a shared walkway to access the houses - Russell Walk.

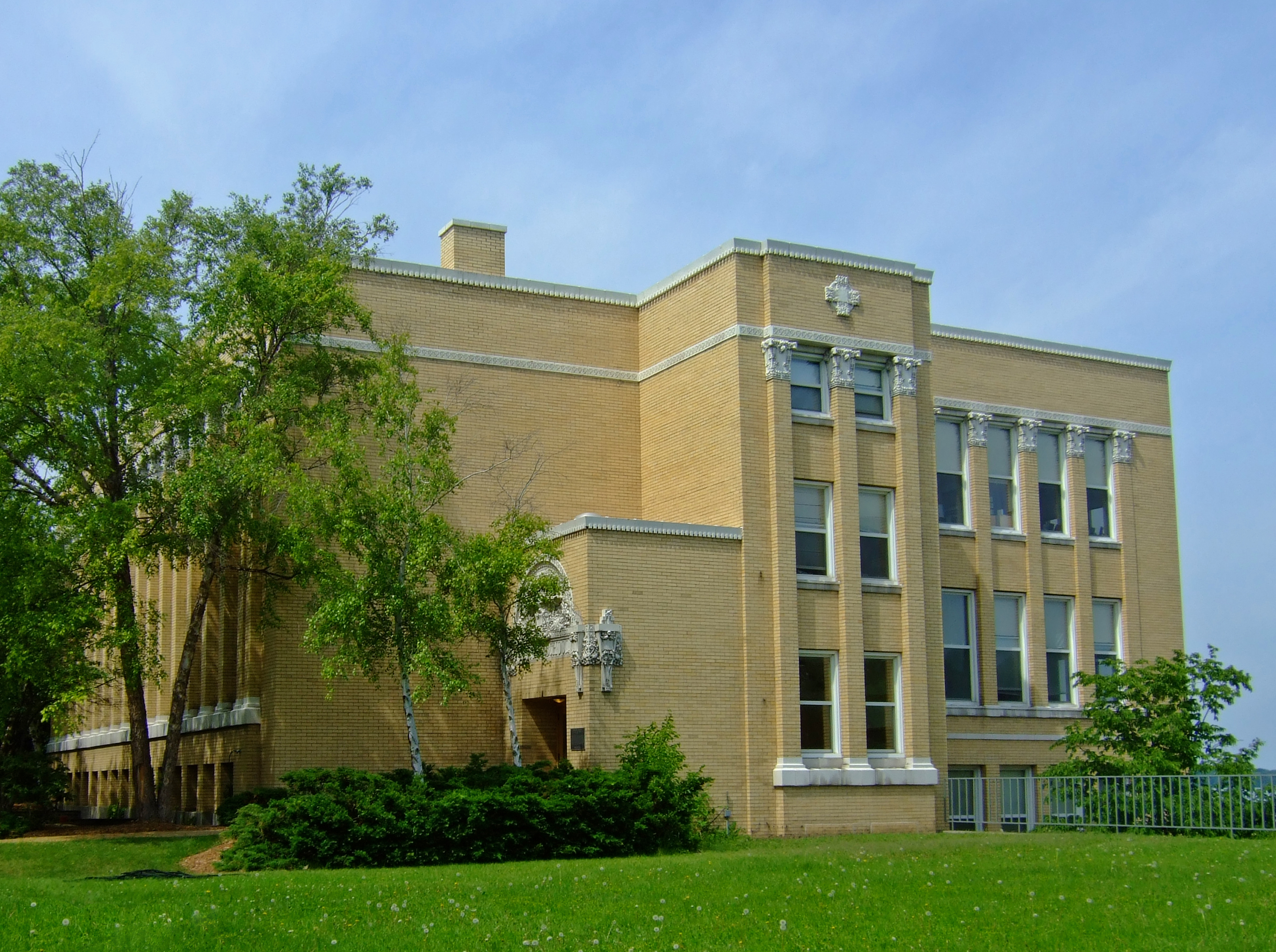
1915 Lincoln School, Prairie Style

- The Lincoln Elementary School at 720 E Gorham St is a 3-story Prairie Style structure designed by Claude & Starck and built in 1915, with bands of windows and lines of trim emphasizing the horizontal. The terra cotta eagles that crown the pilasters were cast using a mold that Grant Elmslie made for the Merchants National Bank building in Winona, Minnesota. This Prairie Style school was built on the site of an earlier 1866 school building which Frank Lloyd Wright once attended.
- The Lillian and James A. Jackson house at 440 N. Paterson St is a Colonial Revival-ish house built in 1917. It too was designed by Claude & Starck with the columns, quoins, and symmetry of Colonial Revival style. The exposed rafter tails suggest classical dentils, but the broader windows are a more modern touch.
