= Ivan A. Nestingen =

20th century American politician

United States Under Secretary of Health, Education, and Welfare
- In office February 7, 1961 – May 31, 1965
- President: John F. Kennedy; Lyndon B. Johnson
- Preceded by: Bertha Adkins
- Succeeded by: Wilbur J. Cohen

46th Mayor of Madison, Wisconsin
- In office April 16, 1956 – February 7, 1961
- Preceded by: Alfred W. Bareis (interim); George J. Forster (elected)
- Succeeded by: Harold E. Hanson (interim); Henry Edward Reynolds (elected)

Member of the Wisconsin State Assembly from the Dane 2nd district
- In office January 3, 1955 – April 16, 1956
- Preceded by: Carl W. Thompson
- Succeeded by: Fred Risser

Personal details
- Born: September 9, 1921 Sparta, Wisconsin, U.S.
- Died: April 24, 1978 (aged 56) Washington, D.C., U.S.
- Resting place: Resurrection Cemetery, Madison, Wisconsin
- Party: Democratic
- Spouse: Geraldine Ann Krawczak (m. 1952–1978)
- Children: 4
- Education: University of Wisconsin Law School
- Profession: Lawyer

Military service
- Allegiance: United States
- Branch/service: United States Army; Army Corps of Engineers
- Years of service: 1943–1946
- Rank: 1st Lieutenant
- Battles/wars: World War II

Ivan Arnold Nestingen (September 9, 1921 – April 24, 1978) was an American lawyer and Democratic politician from Madison, Wisconsin. He served as United States Under Secretary of Health, Education, and Welfare under presidents John F. Kennedy and Lyndon B. Johnson and played an important role in the design and passage of Medicare. Earlier in his career, he was the 46th mayor of Madison (1956–1961) and served part of one term in the Wisconsin State Assembly (1955).

== Early life and education ==
Ivan Nestingen was born and raised in Sparta, Wisconsin. He attended public schools and went on to attend the La Crosse State Teachers College. Before completing his education, he joined the United States Army in the midst of World War II and served in the Army Corps of Engineers until 1946.

After the war, he attended the University of Wisconsin Law School, where he earned his Ph.B. and LL.B. He began a law practice in 1949 in partnership with Robert Y. Dewa.

== Political career ==
In 1951, he was elected to the Madison Common Council; he was re-elected in 1953. Around that time, Nestingen first began receiving statewide notoriety as a leader of the "Joe Must Go" movement—an unsuccessful attempt to recall U.S. senator Joseph McCarthy.

In 1954, a new redistricting plan for the state legislature went into effect and Dane County's Assembly delegation grew from three representatives to five. No incumbent representative lived in the new Dane County 2nd district, where Nestingen then resided. In April 1954, Nestingen declared his candidacy for the seat, running on the Democratic Party ticket. He faced no opposition for the Democratic nomination and went on to defeat county supervisor George H. Harb in the general election.

After just a year in the Assembly, Nestingen entered the race for mayor of Madison, following the resignation of the last elected mayor, George J. Forster. Two other candidates also entered the race—banker John S. Hobbins and incumbent sheriff Franz G. Haas. Hobbins topped the nonpartisan primary, but Nestingen easily surpassed Haas, winning a place on the general election ballot. After a closely contested race, Nestingen prevailed in the April general election with about 52% of the vote. Nestingen went on to win re-election as mayor in 1957 and 1959. Nestingen's most noteworthy contribution as mayor was a massive annexation campaign which saw the city grow by 60% during his two and a half terms. As mayor, he also advocated for the Frank Lloyd Wright Monona Terrace design, but the project would not reach final approval until decades after his mayoral term.

Shortly after his 1959 re-election, Nestingen began organizing support in Wisconsin for the presidential campaign of John F. Kennedy. When Kennedy officially launched his campaign for the presidency, Nestingen became chairman of his Wisconsin operation. Nestingen spent a great deal of time with Kennedy, as he campaigned extensively throughout the state in 1960. Kennedy's victory in the Wisconsin primary over Hubert Humphrey was seen as the first pivotal step in his campaign for the presidency.

Shortly after Kennedy's inauguration as president of the United States, Nestingen was appointed United States Under Secretary of Health, Education, and Welfare. He officially resigned the office of mayor February 7, 1961, and moved to Washington, D.C., to begin his federal service. Shortly after arriving in Washington, Nestingen began advocating for a federal program of medical coverage for older Americans. After Kennedy's death, with the support of president Lyndon B. Johnson, the concept was passed into law as Medicare.

Nestingen left the federal government shortly after Lyndon Johnson's 2nd inauguration. Nestingen was immediately courted to run for governor or lieutenant governor in 1966, but he declined to enter the race, stating instead that he would resume his legal practice. After briefly returning to Madison, Nestingen moved his law practice back to Washington, D.C., where he remained for most of the remainder of his life.

He died of a sudden heart failure at his law office in Washington on April 24, 1978.

== Personal life and family ==
Nestingen married Geraldine Ann "Jerry" Krawczak in 1952; they had met while students at the University of Wisconsin. They had four daughters together, but one died young.

== Electoral history ==
=== Wisconsin Assembly (1954) ===
Wisconsin Assembly, Dane 2nd District Election, 1954
| Party | Candidate | Votes | % | ±% |
|---|---|---|---|---|
General Election, November 2, 1954
| Democratic | Ivan A. Nestingen | 6,019 | 57.58% | −6.58pp |
| Republican | George H. Harb | 4,434 | 42.42% | |
| Plurality | | 1,585 | 15.16% | -13.16% |
| Total votes | | 10,453 | 100.0% | -39.35% |
| Democratic hold | | | | |

=== Madison Mayor (1956, 1957, 1959) ===
Madison Special Mayoral Election, 1956
| Party | Candidate | Votes | % | ±% |
|---|---|---|---|---|
Nonpartisan Primary, March 6, 1956
| Nonpartisan | John S. Hobbins | 10,508 | 44.72% | |
| Nonpartisan | Ivan A. Nestingen | 6,019 | 36.00% | |
| Nonpartisan | Franz G. Haas | 4,531 | 19.28% | |
| Total votes | | 23,497 | 100.0% | |
General Election, April 3, 1956
| Nonpartisan | Ivan A. Nestingen | 15,945 | 52.36% | |
| Nonpartisan | John S. Hobbins | 14,510 | 47.64% | |
| Plurality | | 1,435 | 4.71% | |
| Total votes | | 30,455 | 100.0% | +32.55% |

Madison Mayoral Election, 1957
| Party | Candidate | Votes | % | ±% |
|---|---|---|---|---|
General Election, April 2, 1957
| Nonpartisan | Ivan A. Nestingen (incumbent) | 24,735 | 75.63% | +23.28pp |
| Nonpartisan | A. J. Fiore | 7,969 | 24.37% | |
| Plurality | | 16,766 | 51.27% | +46.55pp |
| Total votes | | 32,704 | 100.0% | +7.38% |

Wisconsin State Assembly
| Preceded by Carl W. Thompson | Member of the Wisconsin State Assembly from the Dane 2nd district January 3, 1955 – April 16, 1956 | Succeeded by Fred Risser |
Political offices
| Preceded by Alfred W. Bareis (interim); George J. Forster (elected) | Mayor of Madison, Wisconsin; April 16, 1956 – February 7, 1961 | Succeeded by Harold E. Hanson (interim); Henry Edward Reynolds (elected) |
Government offices
| Preceded by Bertha Adkins | United States Under Secretary of Health, Education, and Welfare; February 7, 1961 – May 31, 1965 | Succeeded by Wilbur J. Cohen |
