= Albert A. Dye =

American politician (1845–1934)

29th Mayor of Madison, Wisconsin
- In office 1896–1897
- Preceded by: Jabe B. Alford
- Succeeded by: Mathias J. Hoven

Personal details
- Born: November 27, 1845
- Died: November 24, 1934 (aged 88)
- Occupation: Politician

Albert A. Dye (November 27, 1845 – November 24, 1934) was an American politician who served as the 29th mayor of Madison, Wisconsin, from 1896 to 1897. Dye's daughter married Herbert H. Manson, the future chairman of the Democratic Party of Wisconsin.
