= Harold E. Hanson =

20th century American lawyer and mayor

Interim Mayor of Madison, Wisconsin
- In office February 3, 1961 – April 18, 1961
- Preceded by: Ivan A. Nestingen
- Succeeded by: Henry Edward Reynolds

City Attorney of Madison, Wisconsin
- In office May 2, 1938 – May 1, 1961
- Preceded by: Doris E. Lehner (acting)
- Succeeded by: Alton S. Heasler

Personal details
- Born: October 31, 1895 Stoughton, Wisconsin, U.S.
- Died: November 28, 1978 (aged 83) Madison, Wisconsin, U.S.
- Resting place: Forest Hill Cemetery, Madison
- Spouse: Alice Salsman (m. 1923–1978)
- Children: Harlan Philip Hanson (b. 1925, d. 1996); David John Hanson; (b. 1928, d. 1951); Carol Hanson Grisar (b. 1930, d. 2015).
- Education: Lawrence University; University of Wisconsin Law School
- Profession: Lawyer

Military service
- Allegiance: United States
- Branch/service: Wisconsin National Guard
- Years of service: 1917–1918
- Unit: 32nd Div. U.S. Infantry
- Battles/wars: World War I

Harold E. Hanson (October 31, 1895 – November 29, 1978) was an American lawyer from Madison, Wisconsin. He was the city attorney for 23 years (1938–1961), and served as interim mayor during 1961. He also served 11 years as an assistant U.S. attorney.

== Biography ==
Harold E. Hanson was born in Stoughton, Wisconsin, and attended Lawrence University, in Appleton, Wisconsin. While attending university, however, he chose to enlist in the Wisconsin National Guard for service in World War I. He served in a field hospital in France with the 32nd U.S. Infantry Division.

After returning from the war, he completed his education at the University of Wisconsin Law School, graduating in 1922. Shortly after graduating he was appointed city attorney of his hometown, Stoughton. He was then hired as an Assistant United States Attorney for the Western District of Wisconsin, serving from 1927 until 1938.

In 1938, Madison, Wisconsin, city attorney Francis Lamb resigned his office due to poor health. The city council sought applicants to fill the position and ultimately received interest from 14 local attorneys. After an examination, Hanson topped a list of candidates. The city council unanimously approved Hanson's selection in April 1938.

Hanson ultimately served 23 years as city attorney. In 1961, Madison mayor Ivan A. Nestingen was appointed Undersecretary for the United States Department of Health, Education, and Welfare, creating a vacancy in the mayor's office. On February 3, 1961, Hanson was unanimously elected to serve as interim mayor. He served through the April 1961 election, and retired at the end of his 74-day term.

He died at Veterans hospital in Madison on November 29, 1978.

Political offices
Preceded by Ivan A. Nestingen	Mayor of Madison, Wisconsin; February 3, 1961 – April 18, 1961	Succeeded by Henry Edward Reynolds
Legal offices
Preceded by Doris E. Lehner (acting)	City Attorney of Madison, Wisconsin; May 2, 1938 – May 1, 1961	Succeeded by Alton S. Heasler
