= Storm Bull =

American engineer and mayor (1856–1907)

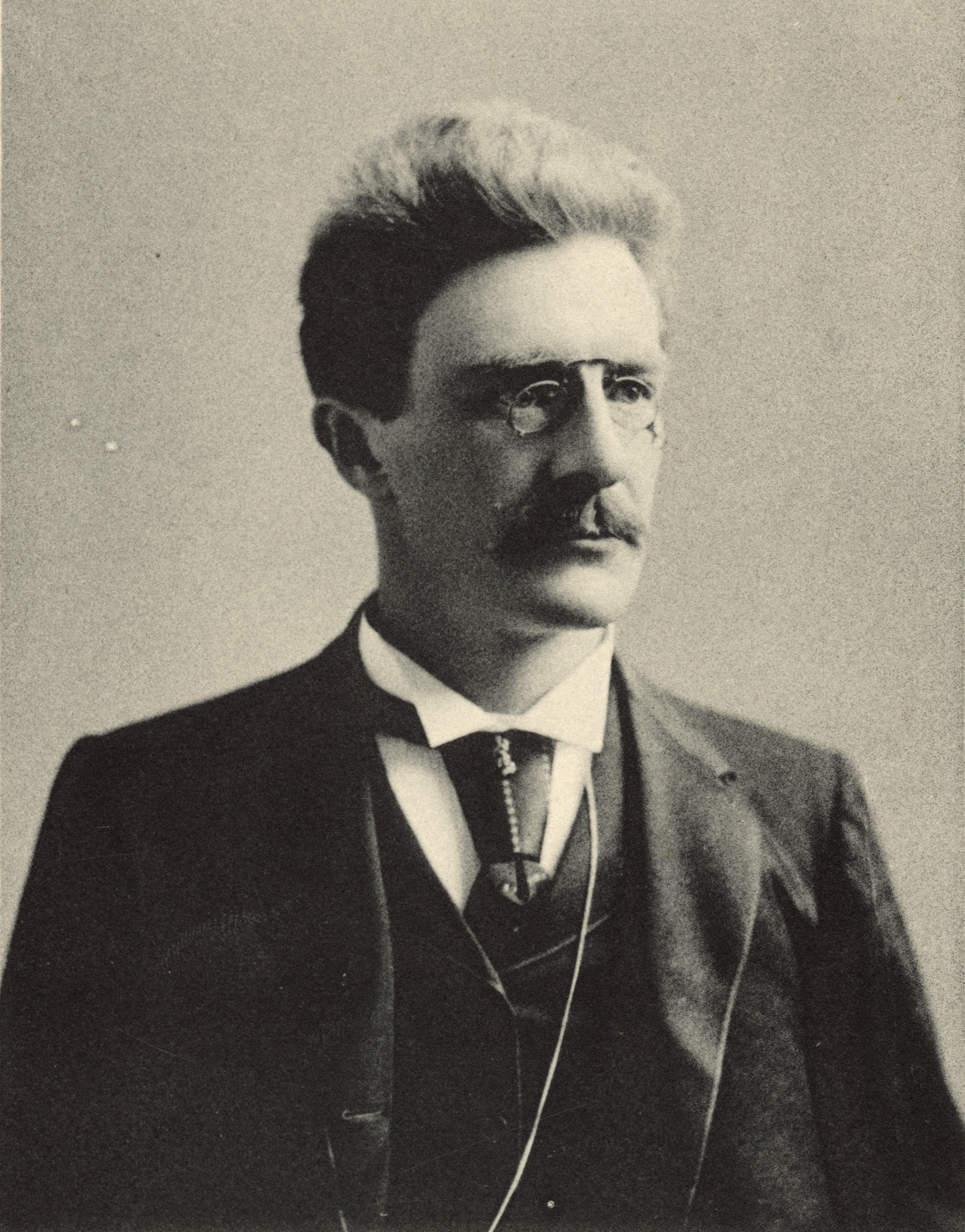

33rd Mayor of Madison, Wisconsin
- In office April 1901 – April 1902
- Preceded by: Mathias J. Hoven
- Succeeded by: John W. Groves

Personal details
- Born: October 20, 1856 Bergen, Hordaland, Norway
- Died: November 17, 1907 (aged 51) Madison, Wisconsin, U.S.
- Cause of death: Stomach cancer
- Resting place: Forest Hill Cemetery, Madison
- Spouses: Marie Margarethe Steineber (died 1883); Dina Munster (m. 1886–1907)
- Children: 1
- Education: Federal Polytechnic School
- Profession: Engineer, educator

Storm Bull (October 20, 1856 – November 17, 1907) was a Norwegian American immigrant, engineer, and educator. He was the 33rd mayor of Madison, Wisconsin.

== Biography ==
Storm Bull was born in Bergen, Hordaland, Norway. He was a nephew of the violinist Ole Bull. He was educated at the Polytechnic Institute in Zurich, Switzerland, where he graduated with a degree in engineering in 1877. He first arrived in Madison, Wisconsin, in 1879, where became a professor in the engineering department of the University of Wisconsin. He was subsequently appointed a professor in mechanical engineering and later professor in steam engineering.

Bull held memberships in the Western Society of Engineers, American Society for Engineering Education and the American Society of Mechanical Engineers. He also served as mayor of Madison, Wisconsin, for one term, from April 1901 to April 1902. He was a Unitarian.

Bull died of stomach cancer in Madison in 1907.

== Other sources ==
- Howe, Charles S. (ed) (1909) "Papers, Reports, Discussions, etc." of the Journal of Engineering Education (Brooklyn, NY: Pratt Institution. Volume 16. page 407)
