= John H. Corscot =

American mayor

27th Mayor of Madison, Wisconsin
- In office 1893–1895
- Preceded by: William H. Rogers
- Succeeded by: Jabe B. Alford

Personal details
- Born: September 12, 1839; Winterswijk, Gelderland, Netherlands
- Died: May 13, 1926 (aged 86)
- Spouse: Julia Francis Mayers
- Parent(s): Gerrit Jan Kortschot; Berendina Freriks
- Occupation: Politician

John H. Corscot (September 12, 1839 – May 13, 1926) was the mayor of Madison, Wisconsin, from 1893 to 1895.

== Biography ==
Corscot was born on September 12, 1839, in the town of Winterswijk in The Netherlands. He was born as Jan Hendrik Kortschot, son of Gerrit Jan Kortschot and Berendina Freriks. He came to the United States in 1846, together with his parents and an elder brother. The family settled in Madison, Wisconsin. He married Julia Francis Mayers. Corscot died on May 13, 1926.
