= James R. Law Jr. =

American politician (1885–1952)

James R. Law, Jr.

42nd Mayor of Madison, Wisconsin
- In office January 1, 1933 – April 1943
- Preceded by: Albert G. Schmedeman
- Succeeded by: Fred Halsey Kraege

Personal details
- Born: James Richard Law, Jr. 1885
- Died: 1952 (aged 66–67)
- Resting place: Forest Hill Cemetery; Madison, Wisconsin
- Party: Republican

James Richard Law Jr. (1885–1952) was an American politician who served as the 42nd Mayor of Madison, Wisconsin, from 1932 to 1943 as a member of the Republican Party.

== Biography ==
Law was appointed Mayor of Madison in late 1932 to complete the unexpired term of Albert G. Schmedeman, who had been elected Governor of Wisconsin in the 1932 general election. He was then elected to remain in the job in 1933 and re-elected in 1935, 1937, 1939, and 1941.

Before his mayorship, Law worked for an architectural firm.

During his mayorship, he was named to an advisory board to aid the federal government in preparing legislation that would affect municipalities. He also joined 32 other US mayors in co-signing a 1938 message to the International Peace Campaign expressing "horror and indignation" at bombing violence happening in other parts of the world.

After serving as mayor, Law served as the chair of Wisconsin's state highway commission, and briefly ran for Governor of Wisconsin in the 1946 Republican primary, but didn't make the ballot. Incumbent Walter Samuel Goodland was renominated and went on to win re-election.

Political offices
Preceded by Albert G. Schmedeman	Mayor of Madison, Wisconsin; 1933 – 1943	Succeeded by Fred Halsey Kraege
