= Isaac Milo Kittleson =

American politician (1874–1958)

40th Mayor of Madison, Wisconsin
- In office 1920–1925
- Preceded by: George C. Sayle
- Succeeded by: Albert G. Schmedeman

Personal details
- Born: November 17, 1874
- Died: April 2, 1958 (aged 83)
- Occupation: Politician

Isaac Milo Kittleson (November 17, 1874 – April 2, 1958) was an American politician who served as the 40th mayor of Madison, Wisconsin, from 1920 to 1925.

His former home, now known as the Curtis-Kittleson House, is listed on the National Register of Historic Places. The house was also lived in by Madison Mayor William Dexter Curtis.
