= Adolph H. Kayser House =

Historic house in Wisconsin, United States

- U.S. National Register of Historic Places
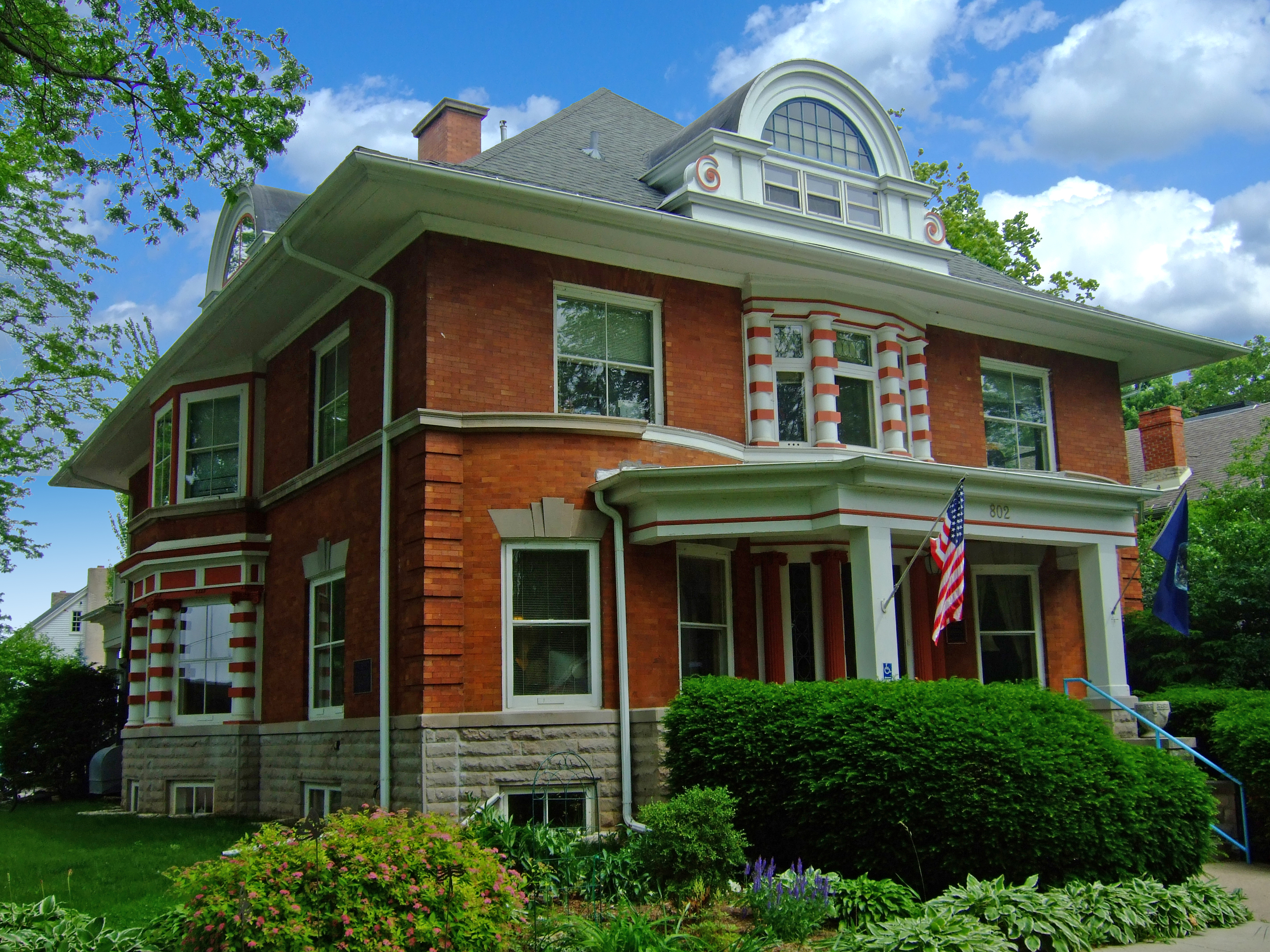
- Adolph H. Kayser House
- Location: 802 E. Gorham St., Madison, Wisconsin
- Coordinates: 43°05′03″N 89°22′44″W
- Area: 0.4 acres (0.16 ha)
- Built: 1902
- Architect: Claude and Starck
- Architectural style: Prairie School
- NRHP reference No.: 80000122
- Added to NRHP: November 28, 1980

The Adolph H. Kayser House is a Prairie Style house built in 1902 a half mile north of the capitol above Lake Mendota in Madison, Wisconsin. In 1980 it was added to the National Register of Historic Places.

== History ==
Adolph H. Kayser was a German immigrant who ran a lumber company in Madison and would become mayor of Madison after this house was built. He was married to Hedwig.

Louis W. Claude and Edward F. Starck started an architecture firm in Madison in 1896. Up into the 1890s almost all designs by American architects were in styles derived from European models (e.g. Greek Revival, Italianate, and Queen Anne) but in the 1890s some American architects started looking for an American style independent of European precedents. The new ideas were called "progressive" and later "Prairie School." Claude had worked for Louis Sullivan in Chicago in the early 1890s, alongside Frank Lloyd Wright and George Elmslie at a time when George Maher was also working in Chicago. All were leaders of the Prairie School. Claude and Starck started out designing in traditional styles like Queen Anne, but gradually shifted to include Prairie style influences in their designs - particularly in the many public libraries they later designed. The Kayser house represents an early point in that transition.

The Kayser house is 2.5 stories, with a footprint roughly rectangular and a hip roof flared above the eaves. Exterior walls are clad in orange-tan brick on a foundation of rock-faced limestone, with brick quoins at the corners. The front porch was originally square, but has been replaced with a polygonal porch supported by square columns. Beneath the porch, the front door is flanked by four Ionic columns, and beyond that, two shallow bays with the outer windows decorated with a flat stone lintel. Above the porch, a centered three-part window is separated by unusual columns, which point to the large arch-fronted dormers that rise from the roof. Other sides of the house have similar bays and dormers. Inside the front door, a central hall leads to shared rooms on the first floor. A dark oak arch leads to a stair to the second floor, with five bedrooms and a bathroom.

Many of these elements are from Classical Revival style: the quoins and columns and the symmetry of the façade. But other elements are Prairie style. The broad eaves and the belt course between the stories emphasize the horizontal. The arched dormers look very much like something from a George Maher design, as do the odd columns above the porch.

The Kaysers lived in the house for 21 years. Then in 1922 they built a new house in the then-popular Colonial Revival style a short distance away at 425 N. Livingston St.

Their 1902 was listed on the National Register of Historic Places in 1980 and on the State Register of Historic Places in 1989, noting that "it represents a fine example of a large residence designed by an important regional architectural firm, Claude and Starck of Madison, Wisconsin, in the 'progressive' manner emerging in the Midwest as opposed to the traditional revival types of architecture."
