= Fred Halsey Kraege =

American politician (1899–1982)

43rd Mayor of Madison, Wisconsin
- In office December 1943 – 1947
- Preceded by: James R. Law Jr.
- Succeeded by: Leonard G. Howell

Personal details
- Born: May 3, 1899
- Died: May 12, 1982 (aged 83)
- Occupation: Politician

Fred Halsey Kraege (May 3, 1899 – May 12, 1982) was an American politician who served as the 43rd mayor of Madison, Wisconsin, from 1943 to 1947.

== Education ==
Kraege graduated from the University of Wisconsin–Madison as part of the class of 1922.

== Career ==
In 1935, while serving in his third term as a member of the Madison City Council, he was elected as president of the body.

While Kraege was mayor, Madison switched to a City Manager form of government in a November 1946 referendum, effective after the following April election. On April 15, 1947 Kraege was appointed Acting City Manager until the appointment of a permanent city manager in September 1947.

A 1950 article in The Berkshire Eagle described Kraege as "a capable mayor" who in 1946 was "finishing out four terms marked by efficient administration" in describing the city's switch to a city manager form of government when reporting on the later firing of Madison's city manager.
