= Orton Park =

Park in Madison, Wisconsin, US

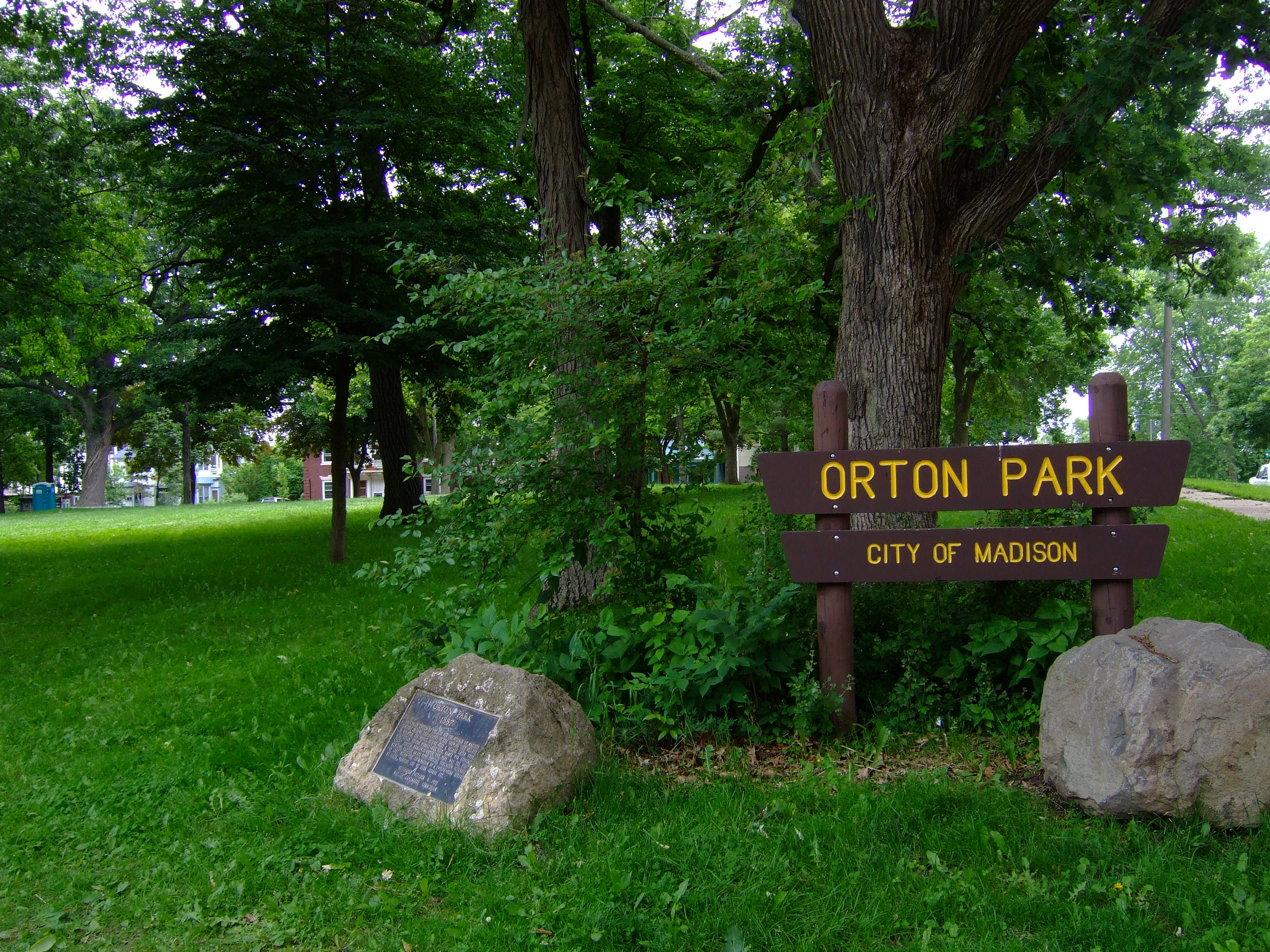
- Plaque and sign at the park.
- Interactive map of Orton Park
- Location: 1100 Spaight St., Madison, Wisconsin
- Coordinates: 43°04′51″N 89°21′47″W
- Area: 3.5 acres (1.4 ha)
- Opened: 1887
- Etymology: Harlow S. Orton
- Orton Park
- U.S. National Register of Historic Places
- NRHP reference No.: 78000091
- Added to NRHP: December 18, 1978

Orton Park is a public park located at 1100 Spaight Street in Madison, Wisconsin.

== History ==
The land was designated as a public cemetery in 1846, the same year Madison was chartered as a village. Madison quickly outgrew the cemetery, and by the 1850s the Common Council was already looking for a larger site. In 1877, the graves located at the site were moved to Forest Hill Cemetery.

The site officially opened as a park in 1887, making it the first public park in Madison. Other proposals for the site included a beer garden and a hospital. It was named after Wisconsin Supreme Court justice Harlow S. Orton. The park has hosted neighborhood events since its creation; these originally included concerts and ice cream socials, and have more recently included a farmer's market and neighborhood festival.

The park was added to the National Register of Historic Places on December 18, 1978. It is located within the Orton Park Historic District, which is also listed on the National Register.
