= John W. Groves =

American politician (1844–1921)

34th Mayor of Madison, Wisconsin
- In office 1902–1903
- Preceded by: Storm Bull
- Succeeded by: William Dexter Curtis

Personal details
- Born: 1844
- Died: December 4, 1921 (aged 76–77)
- Occupation: Politician

John W. Groves (1844–1921) was an American politician who served as the 34th mayor of Madison, Wisconsin, from 1902 to 1903.
