= George A. Lougee House =

Historic house in Wisconsin, United States

- U.S. National Register of Historic Places
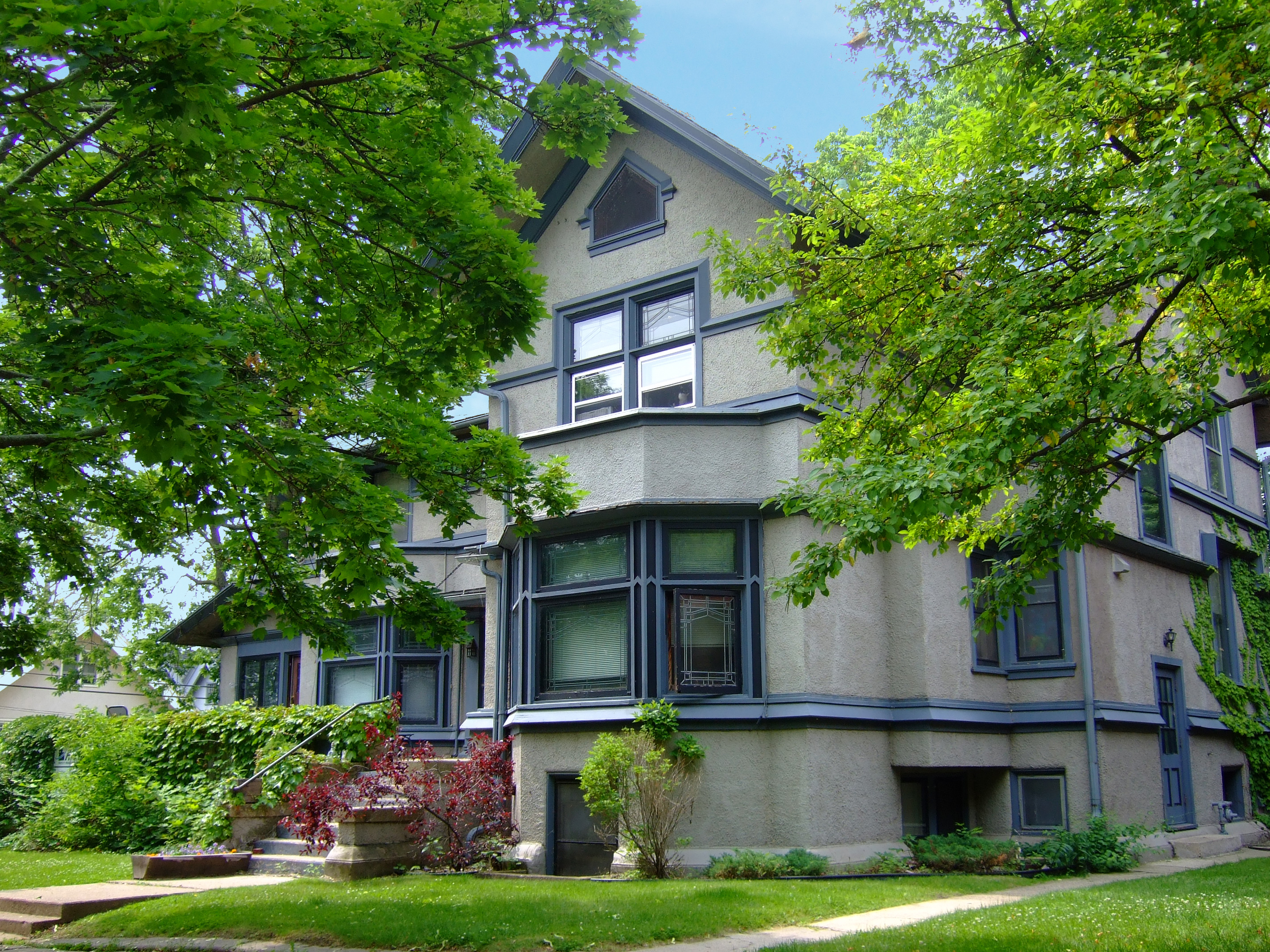

- Location within Wisconsin Location within the United States
- Location: 620 S. Ingersoll St. Madison, Wisconsin
- Coordinates: 43°4′48″N 89°21′49″W
- Area: 0.1 acres (0.040 ha)
- Built: 1907
- Architect: Claude and Starck
- Architectural style: Prairie School
- NRHP reference No.: 78000090
- Added to NRHP: June 7, 1978

The George A. Lougee House is a historic house located at 620 South Ingersoll Street in Madison, Wisconsin, United States. The house was built in 1907 for hotel proprietor George A. Lougee. Architects Claude and Starck, a prominent local firm with ties to Frank Lloyd Wright, designed the Prairie School home. It was added to the National Register of Historic Places in 1978.

== History and architecture ==
George A. Lougee was born in New Hampshire in 1850. By 1875, he had entered the hospitality business, operating the Pennsylvania Railroad's first dining car. Lougee ran Madison's Park Hotel from 1891 until 1911; while his house was built in 1907, relatively late in his tenure at the hotel, he lived in Madison until his death in 1932. Lougee also managed the Palmer House in Chicago, the New Kimball Hotel in Atlanta, and the University Club in Madison.

Lougee hired the prominent Madison architectural firm of Louis W. Claude and Edward F. Starck to design his home. The two architects were partners from 1896 until 1929 and designed both residences and public buildings across Wisconsin and its neighboring states. Claude was a friend of Frank Lloyd Wright, and Wright's Prairie School designs influenced the firm's residential work. The Lougee House, which is similar to Wright's B. Harley Bradley House in Kankakee, Illinois, is one of the firm's most highly regarded home designs.

The two-story house has a stucco exterior, as was common for Prairie School homes, and a gable roof. A cross gable extends forward from the east side of the house, and an attached porch extends along the home's south side. The entrance, located next to the cross gable, features floral-patterned leaded glass windows. Horizontal wooden bands above and below the windows on both floors and a terrace wall along the east side give the house a horizontal emphasis, a key element of Prairie School architecture.

The house was designated a landmark by the Madison Landmarks Commission in 1977. It was added to the National Register of Historic Places on June 7, 1978. Additionally, it is located within the Orton Park Historic District.
