= Jabe B. Alford =

American politician (1850–1927)

28th Mayor of Madison, Wisconsin
- In office 1895–1896
- Preceded by: John H. Corscot
- Succeeded by: Albert A. Dye

Personal details
- Born: September 21, 1850
- Died: September 10, 1927 (aged 76)
- Party: Democratic
- Occupation: Politician

Jabe B. Alford (September 21, 1850 – September 10, 1927) was an American politician who served as the 28th mayor of Madison, Wisconsin, from 1895 to 1896.

== Biography ==
A native of Syracuse, New York, Alford was born on September 21, 1850. He moved to Madison in 1855. Alford died on September 10, 1927.

== Career ==
Alford was mayor from 1895 to 1896. Previously, he was a member of the city council from 1890 to 1891. He was a Democrat.
