= George J. Forster =

American politician (1905–1988)

45th Mayor of Madison, Wisconsin
- In office 1950 – April 1955
- Preceded by: Leonard G. Howell
- Succeeded by: Ivan A. Nestingen

Personal details
- Born: July 26, 1905
- Died: November 17, 1988 (aged 83)
- Occupation: Politician

George J. Forster (July 26, 1905 – November 17, 1988) was an American politician who served as the 45th mayor of Madison, Wisconsin, from 1950 to 1955. He subsequently served 17 months as city manager of Janesville, Wisconsin. Forster returned to Madison government in 1971 when he was elected alderperson from the 19th district. He served one term, opting not to run again in the 1973 election.
