= Curtis-Kittleson House =

Historic house in Wisconsin, United States

- Curtis–Kittleson House
- U.S. National Register of Historic Places
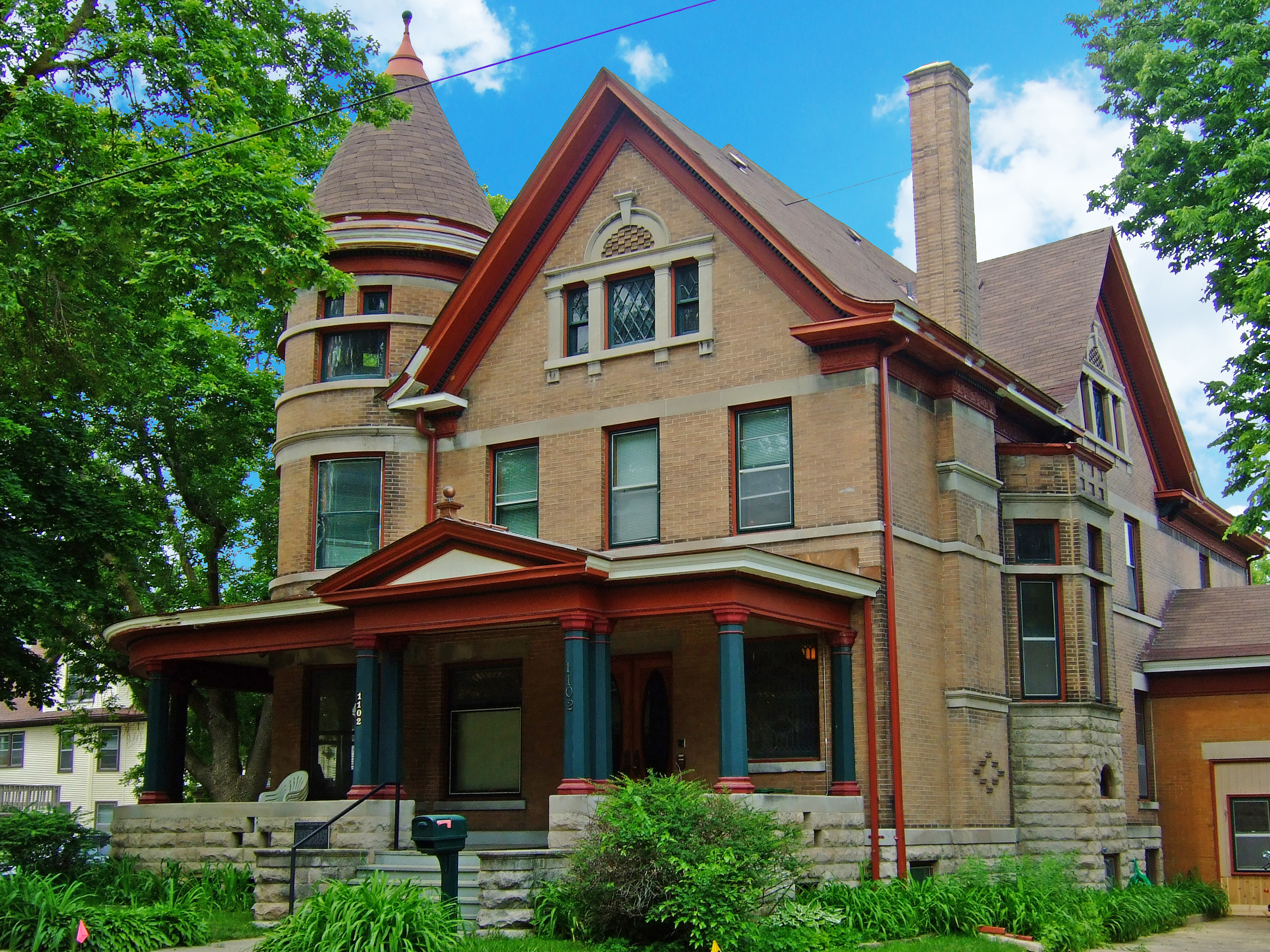

- Location within Wisconsin Location within the United States
- Location: 1102 Spaight St. Madison, Wisconsin
- Coordinates: 43°4′51″N 89°21′52″W
- Built: 1901
- Architect: J. W. Gordon and F. W. Paunack
- Architectural style: Queen Anne
- NRHP reference No.: 80000118
- Added to NRHP: April 10, 1980

The Curtis–Kittleson House (also known as the Thoreau House) is a Queen Anne-style mansion built in 1901 for William Dexter Curtis, a prominent businessman and mayor of Madison whose fortune started with horse collars and saddlery. The house was later the home of Isaac Milo Kittleson, another mayor of Madison. In 1980 the house was added to the National Register of Historic Places.

== History ==
In 1870 Dexter Curtis, the father of the man who built this house, patented a method of enclosing small sheets of zinc in leather horse collar pads to reduce the sores on horses' necks. With this innovation, he started the Dexter Curtis Company to sell saddlery equipment. His company was so successful that it had factories overseas in England and France along with Madison and Michigan, and he made a fortune.

The elder Curtis's son William Dexter Curtis was managing his father's saddlery business when old Curtis died in 1898. At times William also served as chairman of the board of Union Trust Co., as vice-president of the 1st National Bank, and as v.p. and financial manager of the L.L. Olds Seed Co. As a sign of their success, in 1901 William and his wife Mary built this mansion on a prominent corner in a prestigious neighborhood.

They hired the Madison architects J.O. Gordon and F.W. Paunack, who designed a large brick 2.5-story home in the then-popular Queen Anne style. Typical elements of that style are the corner tower, the asymmetric wraparound porch, the corbelled chimneys, and the variety of surface textures. The pediment and columns of the porch, and the Palladian windows in the gable ends are drawn from the Classical Revival style that was becoming popular in 1901.

William was elected mayor of Madison in 1904. While mayor, he helped induce the Chicago and North Western Railway to build new passenger and freight stations in Madison. He also encouraged expansion of Madison's park and drive system. He served only one term as mayor, and died in 1935.

Isaac Kittleson bought the house from the Curtises in 1949. Kittleson had grown up on a farm in Green County, graduated from the UW Law School in 1902, and became secretary and director of the Savings and Loan Trust Co. In 1906 he married Ida Johnson of Mt. Horeb. She served as treasurer of the Public Welfare Association, the YWCA, and as President of the Dane County Humane Society. Isaac served as a city alderman and three terms as mayor beginning in 1920. They were well-established community leaders by the time they bought the house in 1949.

Rev. Richard Larson of Bethel Lutheran Church and his wife owned the house after the Kittlesons. Now it is Thoreau House, a group home. The house was designated a landmark by the Madison Landmarks Commission in 1978. It is located within the Orton Park Historic District.
