= Orton Park Historic District =

Historic district in Wisconsin, United States

- U.S. National Register of Historic Places
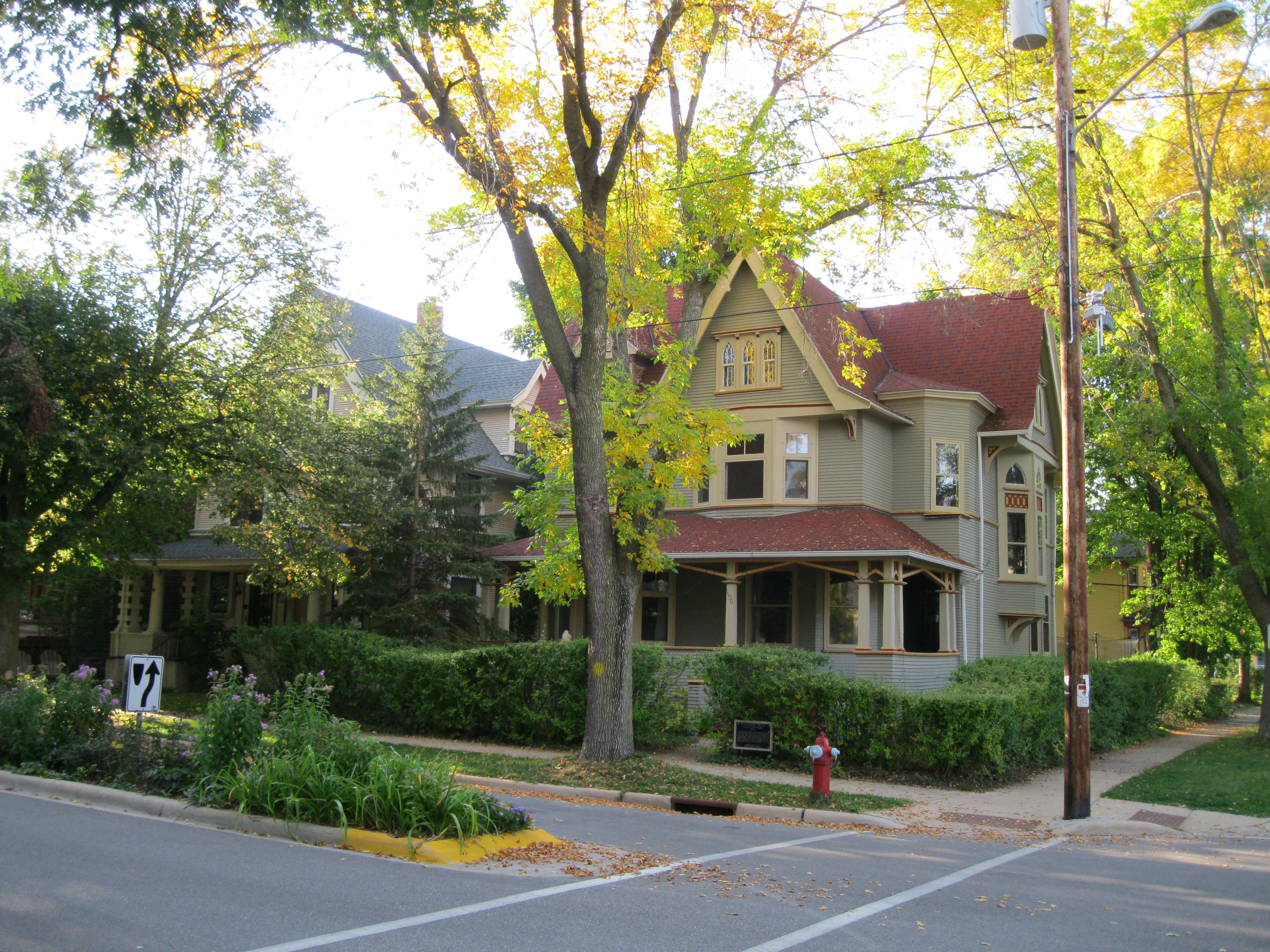
- Bascom Clarke house, Queen Anne, 1899

- Location within Wisconsin
- Location: Roughly bounded by Spaight St., S. Few St., Lake Monona, and S. Ingersoll St., Madison, Wisconsin
- Coordinates: 43°04′50″N 89°21′46″W
- Area: 13.1 acres (5.3 ha)
- NRHP reference No.: 88000221
- Added to NRHP: October 31, 1988

The Orton Park Historic District is a residential historic district on the near east side of Madison, Wisconsin. The district is centered on Orton Park, the first public park in Madison, and includes 56 houses facing or near to the park. The first houses in the area were built in the 1850s during a local housing boom; however, after the Panic of 1857 ended the boom, development in the area halted. When Orton Park was developed out of a former cemetery in the 1880s, more houses were built near the park; construction in the district continued through the 1950s. Many houses in the district were designed in the Queen Anne, Prairie School, and Craftsman styles, and local architects Claude and Starck designed at least seven houses in the district. The district also includes examples of Greek Revival, Italianate, and Colonial Revival architecture.

The district was added to the National Register of Historic Places on October 31, 1988. Three houses in the district, the Bascom B. Clarke House, the Curtis-Kittleson House and the George A. Lougee House are listed individually on the National Register, as is Orton Park itself.

These are good examples of different architecture styles within the district, in roughly the order built.

- The John and Harriet Martin house at 1033 Spaight St. is a 2.5-story Italianate-styled house built in 1855. The shallow hip roof and double brackets supporting the eaves are typical of the style. This example has short windows tucked into the frieze and is clad in local sandstone. The dormers were added after 1947 and the entry porch is a later replacement for the original wraparound veranda. John Martin was a businessman who moved from Cincinnati to co-publish the Madison Patriot.
- The William Collinson house at 1139 Rutledge St is a 2-story cottage built in 1856. Its style is Greek Revival, which is seen in the rather low-pitched roof, the cornice returns, and the lack of decoration in the window sills and lintels. The entry porch is fancier than typical Greek Revival - perhaps more in the direction of Eastlake. The structure of the older part of the house is hewn timbers, whereas newer parts are balloon framed. From 1892 to 1969 the family of Edward Appleby, an accountant at Fuller and Johnson, lived here.

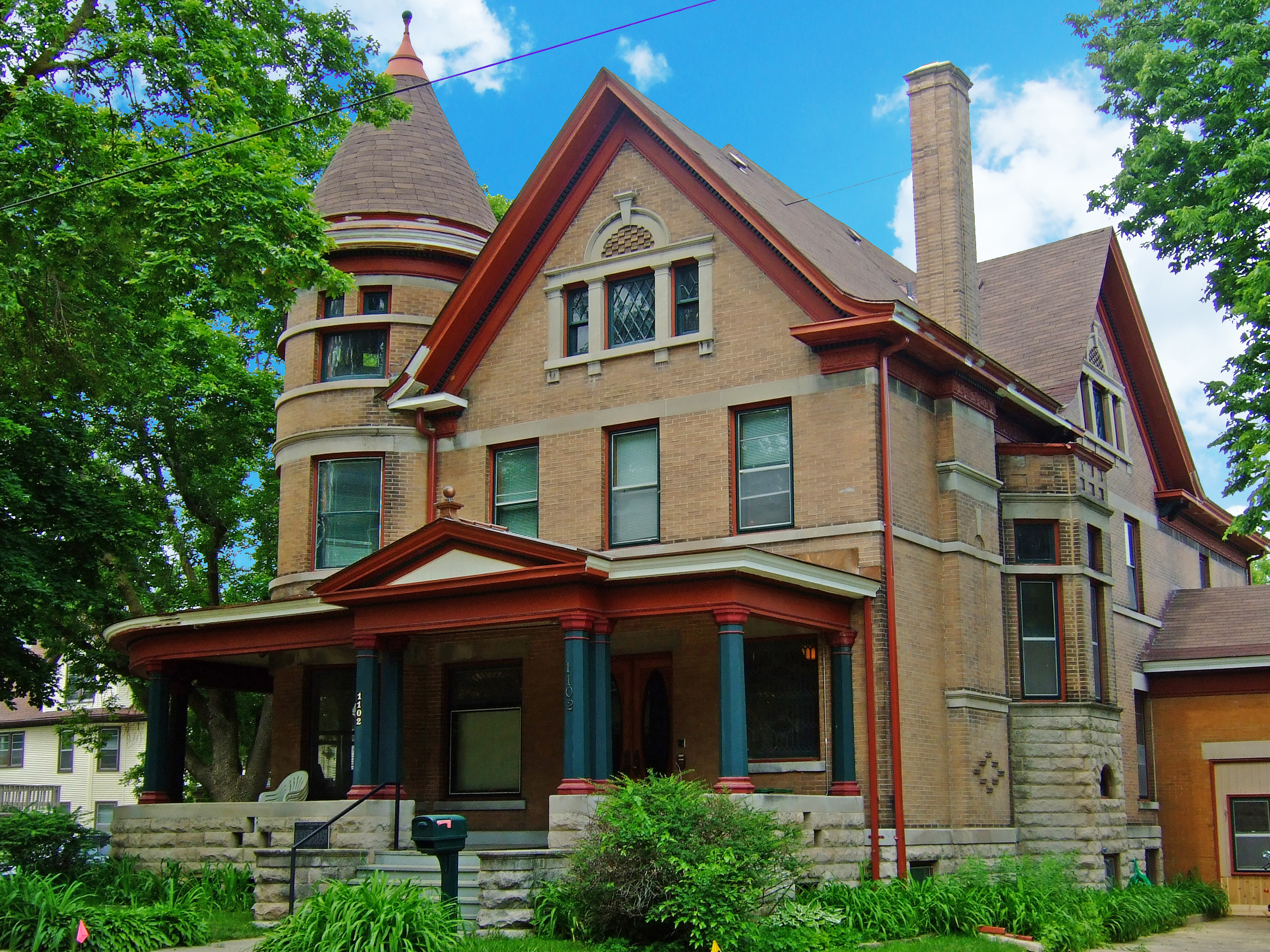
Curtis-Kittleson house, Queen Anne, 1901

- The Curtis-Kittleson House at 1102 Spaight Street is a 2.5-story mansion built in 1901. Designed by Gordon and Panauck, it displays most of the features of Queen Anne style: an asymmetric façade with a corner tower and wraparound porch, a complex roof, tall chimneys, and stained glass windows. The walls are a pink-orange brick. The Palladian window in the gable end and the columns of the porch are drawn from Neoclassical style - common in later Queen Annes. The house was built for Dexter Curtis, whose father sold saddlery equipment, but who succeeded on his own trading agricultural implements.
- The Wynne house at 1047 Rutledge Street is a 2-story house designed by Claude and Starck and built in 1905. The style is Prairie School, evident in the horizontal emphasis of the façade and the bands of windows. The stucco walls are also common for that style. Not typical of the style are the arch-topped windows, and the second gable peak behind and parallel to the front one. Frank Wynne was an attorney and real estate developer.

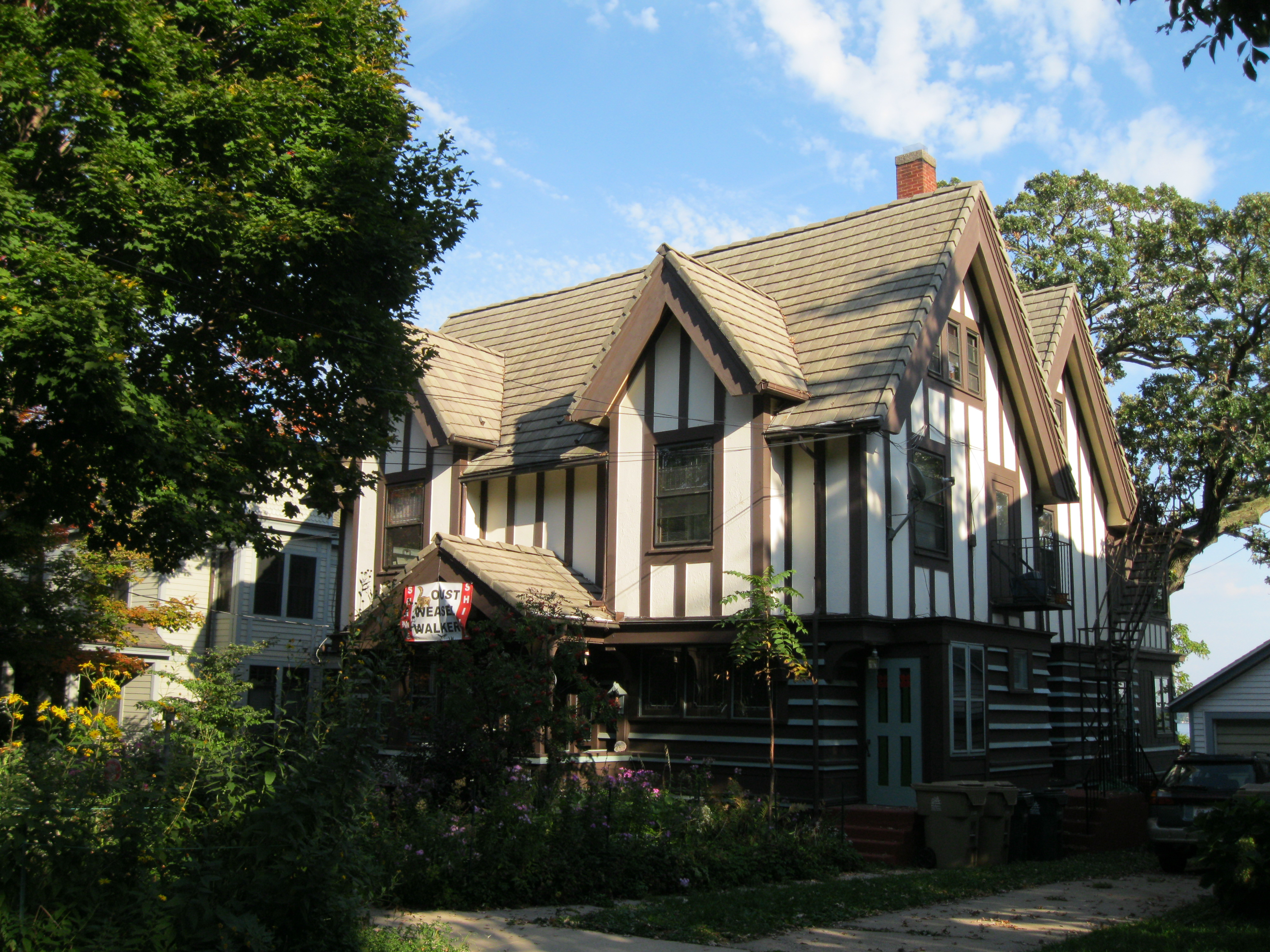
Miller house, Tudor Revival and perhaps Craftsman, 1907

- The Miller house at 1125 Rutledge Street is another house designed by Claude and Starck - this one built in 1907. Its style is Tudor Revival, with the typical steep roof and the common false half-timbering in the second story, but as is common with Claude and Stark, the Revival style is leavened with modern touches: the half-timbering is all vertical lines rather than more interesting shapes; the windows are broad and convenient; the no-drama chimneys do not dominate the façade. And the first floor is clad in horizontal board and batten - an unusual choice. George Miller was president of the G.P. Miller Lumber Company.

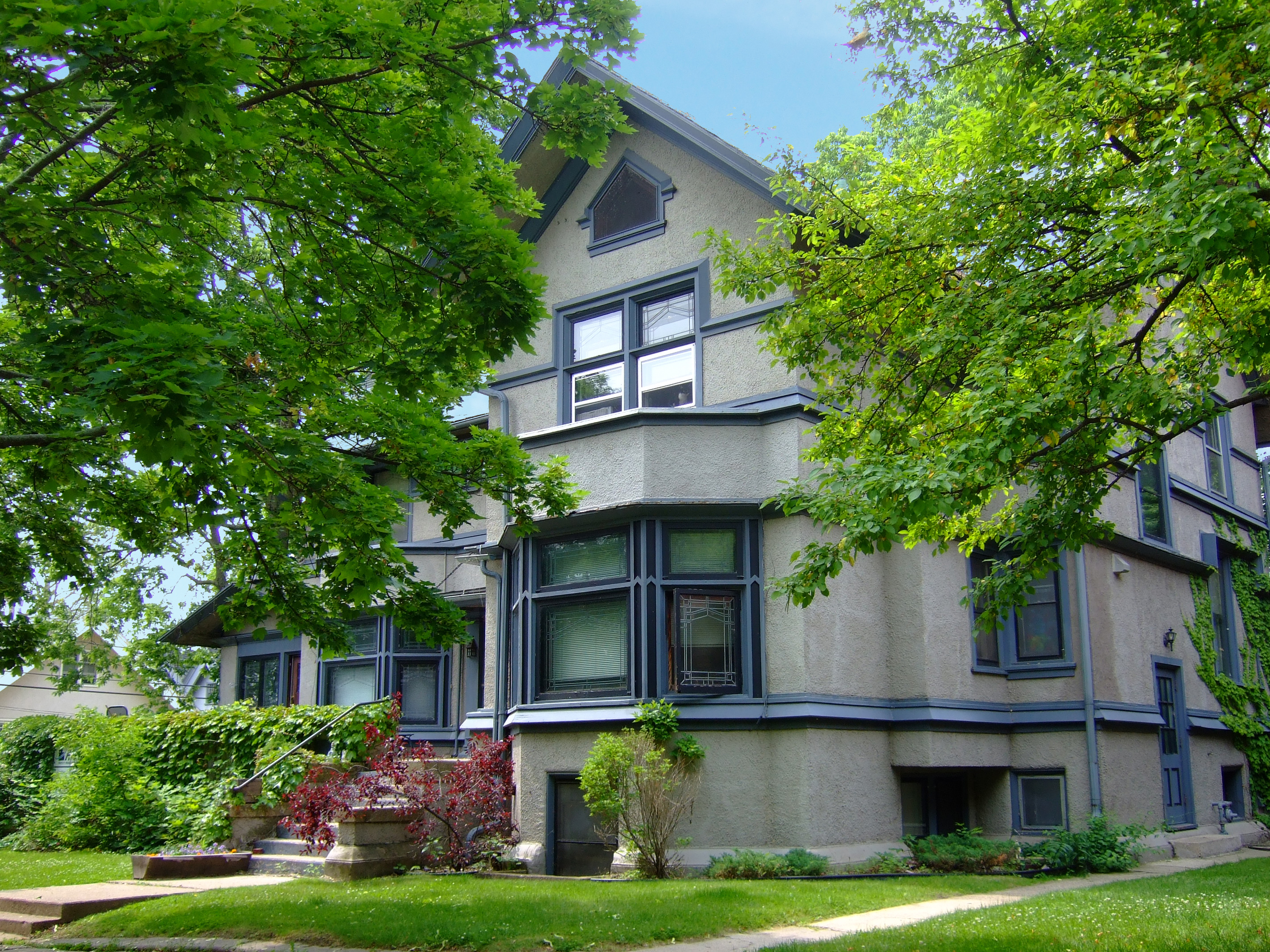
Lougee house, Prairie style, 1907

- The Lougee house at 620 S. Ingersoll is a 2-story Prairie Style house designed by Claude and Starck and built in 1907. The design shows a strong horizontal emphasis in the belt course and the broad eaves. The exterior is stucco and the roof is covered in slate. The house resembles Frank Lloyd Wright's Harley Bradley house in Kankakee, Illinois. George Lougee was a hotelier, operating the Park Hotel and University Club in Madison and the Palmer House in Chicago.

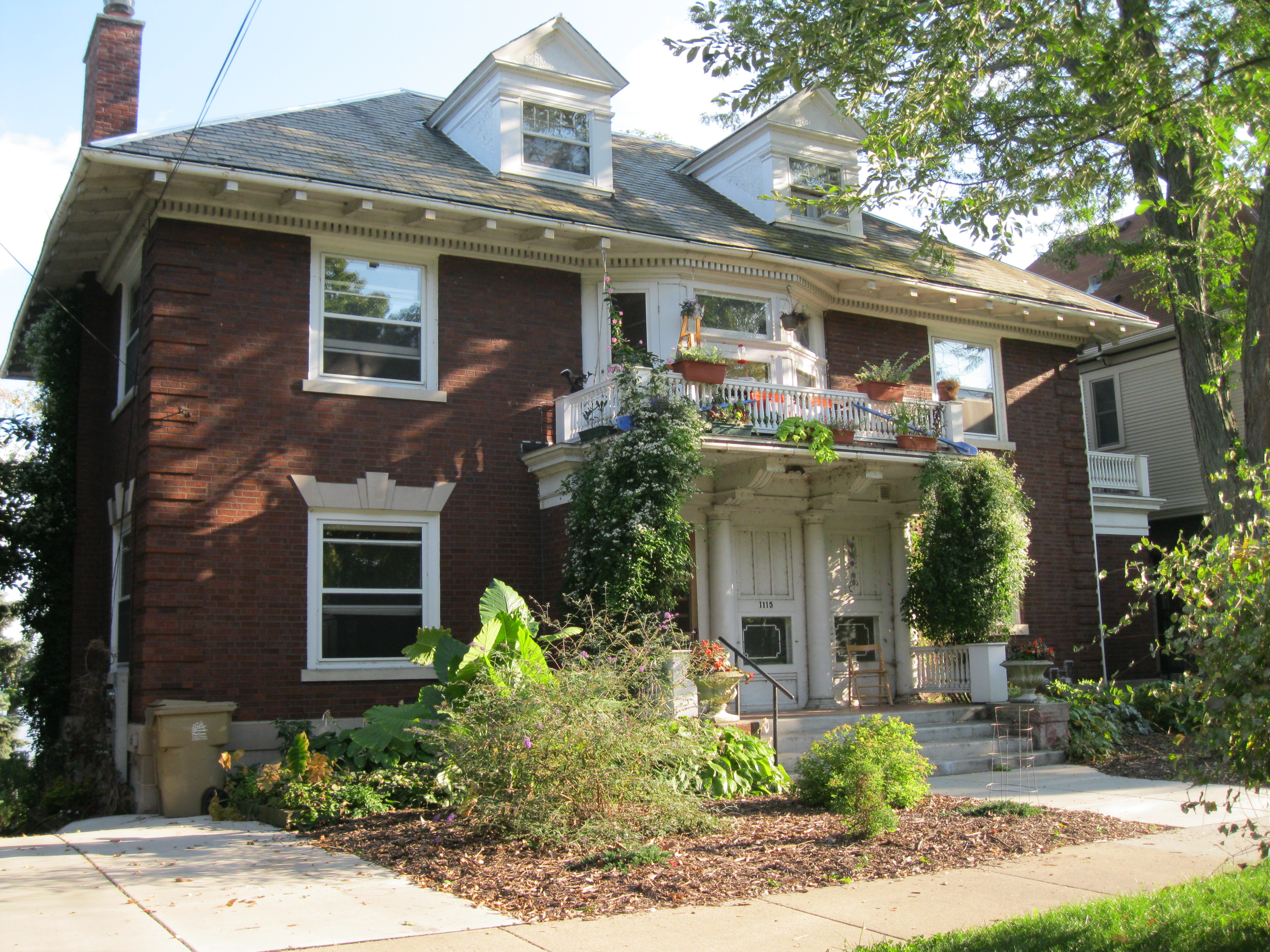
Mason house, Prairie style and Colonial Revival, 1913

- The Mason house at 1115 Rutledge Street is a 2.5-story house designed by Claude and Starck and built in 1913. Its massing is Prairie Style (hip roof, broad windows, strong horizontal lines), but the details are Colonial Revival (the pediments in the dormers, the corner quoins, the columns framing the front door, the keystone ornament above windows, and the denticulated cornice under the eaves. George Mason was president of the Mason Donaldson Lumber Company.
