= William Dexter Curtis =

American politician (1857–1935)

35th Mayor of Madison, Wisconsin
- In office 1904–1905
- Preceded by: John W. Groves
- Succeeded by: Joseph C. Schubert

Personal details
- Born: July 4, 1857
- Died: December 19, 1935 (aged 78)
- Occupation: Politician

William Dexter Curtis (July 4, 1857 – December 19, 1935) was an American politician who served as the 35th mayor of Madison, Wisconsin, from 1904 to 1905.

His former home, now known as the Curtis-Kittleson House, is listed on the National Register of Historic Places. The house was also lived in by Madison Mayor Isaac Milo Kittleson.
