= Herbert H. Manson =

American lawyer

Herbert H. Manson was Chairman of the Democratic Party of Wisconsin.

== Biography ==
Manson was born in 1872. He would graduate from the University of Wisconsin Law School and marry the daughter of former Madison, Wisconsin Mayor Albert A. Dye. They would adopt one child together. Manson died on April 29, 1914.

== Career ==
Manson was Chairman of the Democratic Party of Wisconsin from 1906 to 1909. He had also served as Chairman of the Marathon County, Wisconsin Democratic Party, City Attorney of Wausau, Wisconsin and District Attorney of Marathon County. In 1902, he was a candidate for the Wisconsin State Assembly. Manson was a delegate to the 1908 Democratic National Convention before being appointed as Collector of Internal Revenue of the Western District of Wisconsin by U.S. President Woodrow Wilson.
