= Bascom B. Clarke House =

Historic house in Wisconsin, United States

- U.S. National Register of Historic Places
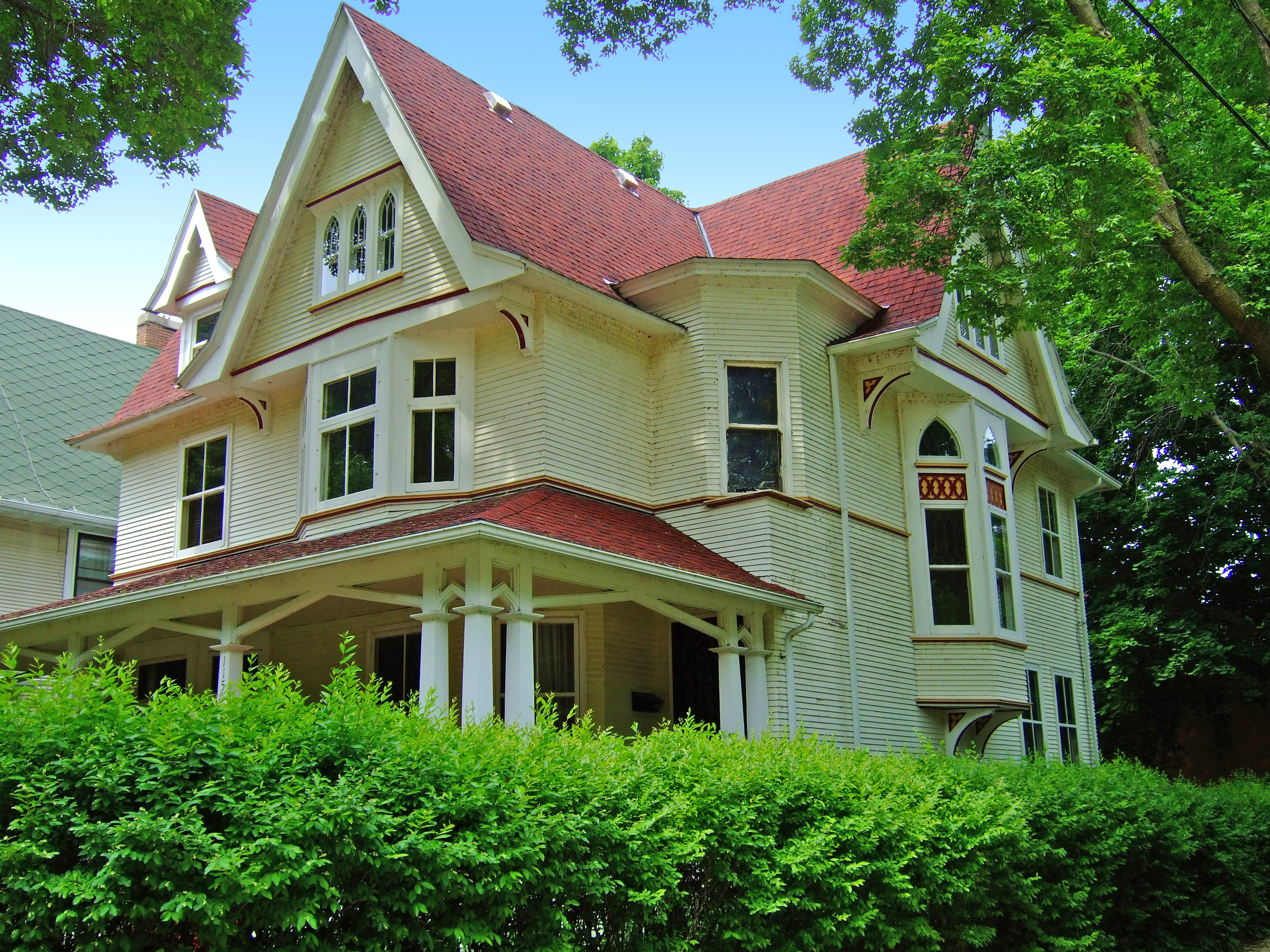
- Bascom B. Clarke House
- Location: 1150 Spaight St., Madison, Wisconsin
- Coordinates: 43°04′55″N 89°21′46″W
- Area: 0.3 acres (0.12 ha)
- Built: 1899; 127 years ago
- Architect: Claude and Starck
- Architectural style: Queen Anne
- NRHP reference No.: 80000117
- Added to NRHP: November 28, 1980

The Bascom B. Clarke House in Madison, Wisconsin was built in 1899, designed in Queen Anne style with Gothic Revival details for Clarke, who founded the magazine American Thresherman. In 1980 it was added to the National Register of Historic Places.

== History and description ==
Bascom B. Clarke was born in Virginia in 1851. In 1857, his family headed west, where his father founded the town of Mount Adams on the White River in Arkansas. After the Civil War Bascom lived in Colfax, Indiana. With only a few weeks of formal education in his whole life, he became postmaster and published a newspaper. In 1873 he married M. Belle Watkins. Their beginnings were humble - Bascom later said that their first home in Indiana was "furnished with a borrowed table and a borrowed bedstead" - but he made a small fortune selling threshing machines.

In 1890 Clarke moved to Madison, continuing in the threshing machine business. There he helped organize the Dane County Telephone Company with Robert La Follette and others. In 1898 he began publishing American Thresherman, the only magazine at that time to focus on the mechanization of farming. Bascom regularly contributed a column called "Uncle Silas" in which he shared his own musings, like "Most of the skyscrapers in the cities have farmer boys as tenants."

In 1899 Clarke had the architectural firm Claude & Starck of Madison design this house. The firm had just formed the year before and would go on to design many Prairie Style libraries around the state, but this early design is residential and traditional. The house stands 2.5 stories, built of wood. The complex roof, asymmetric gables and bays fall within the Queen Anne architectural style that was popular at the time. Yet the pointed-arch church-like windows in the dormer ends draw from Gothic Revival style and some of the woodwork on the porch draws from Stick style. Inside was dark woodwork, a brick fireplace, and bookcases with Prairie Style leaded-glass doors. The house cost $4,500 to build.

Bascom was also instrumental in establishing a Masonic temple in Madison. He died in 1929. In 1980 his house was added to the NRHP as an early design of Claude and Starck and as home of one of Madison's leading citizens. The house is now located within the Orton Park Historic District.
