= Joseph C. Schubert =

American politician (1871–1959)

36th Mayor of Madison, Wisconsin
- In office 1906–1911
- Preceded by: William Dexter Curtis
- Succeeded by: John B. Heim

Personal details
- Born: January 9, 1871
- Died: November 10, 1959 (aged 88)
- Party: Democratic
- Occupation: Politician

Joseph C. Schubert (January 9, 1871 – November 10, 1959) was an American politician who served as the 36th mayor of Madison, Wisconsin, from 1906 to 1911. Schubert was a Democrat.
