= Nils P. Haugen =

Norwegian American immigrant, lawyer, and politician (1849–1931)

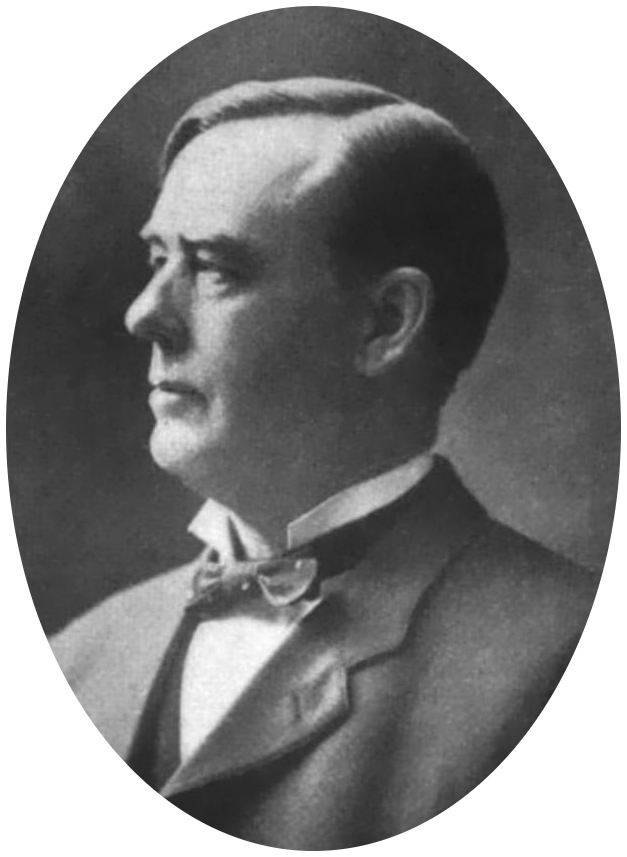
- Nils P. Haugen in 1912

Member of the U.S. House of Representatives from Wisconsin
- In office March 4, 1887 – March 3, 1895
- Preceded by: Hugh H. Price (8th); District established (10th)
- Succeeded by: Lyman E. Barnes (8th); John J. Jenkins (10th)
- Constituency: 8th district (1887-93); 10th district (1893-95)

Member of the Wisconsin State Assembly from the Pierce district
- In office January 6, 1879 – January 3, 1881
- Preceded by: Charles A. Hawn
- Succeeded by: Franklin L. Gilson

Personal details
- Born: March 9, 1849 Modum, Norway
- Died: April 23, 1931 (aged 82) Madison, Wisconsin, U.S.
- Resting place: Forest Hill Cemetery; Madison, Wisconsin, U.S.
- Party: Republican (Progressive)

Nils Pederson Haugen (March 9, 1849 – April 23, 1931) was a Norwegian American immigrant, lawyer, and politician. He served four terms in the United States House of Representatives, representing western Wisconsin. He was a leading member of the Progressive Movement in Wisconsin and a national expert on tax reform. The village of Haugen, Wisconsin, in Barron County, was named after him.

== Background ==
Born in Modum, Buskerud, Norway, Haugen immigrated to the United States in 1854 with his parents. They settled in Pierce County, Wisconsin, in 1855. Haugen attended Luther College, in Decorah, Iowa. Haugen graduated from the law department of the University of Michigan in 1874. He was admitted to the bar the same year and commenced practice in River Falls, Wisconsin. He also served for several years as a court reporter for the 8th and later the 11th judicial circuits.

Haugen's former home, the William T. Leitch House, is listed on the National Register of Historic Places. The house was also home to Madison, Wisconsin, mayors William T. Leitch and Moses Ransom Doyon.

Haugen wed the former Ingeborg "Belle" Rasmussen in Saint Croix county, Wisconsin in 1875.

== Career ==
Haugen served in the Wisconsin State Assembly in 1879 and 1880. He was the Wisconsin Railroad Commissioner from 1882 until 1887. In 1887, Haugen was elected as a Republican Congressman to the Fiftieth Congress. He was elected as the representative of Wisconsin's 8th congressional district. Haugen was reelected to the Fifty-first, Fifty-second, and Fifty-third Congresses. In his last congressional term, he represented the newly created Wisconsin's 10th congressional district, following redistricting. Overall he served from March 4, 1887, until March 3, 1895. He did not seek renomination in 1894 but was an unsuccessful candidate for the nomination for Governor of Wisconsin.

Haugen was often associated with and served as a political ally of Robert M. La Follette, Sr. Wisconsin Republican Party dissidents who joined La Follette became known as the Progressive faction. Progressives stressed the need for more direct voter control and championed consumer rights. Their call for reform gained more support after the Panic of 1893 shook up the economic, class, and ethnic assumptions held by many Americans. In 1894, the Progressives began to openly campaign for leadership of the Republican Party in Wisconsin. Nils Haugen sought the party nomination for governor in 1894 and Robert La Follette followed in 1896 and 1898.

After La Follette was elected governor of Wisconsin, he appointed Haugen to the Tax Commission in 1901. Haugen served on the Wisconsin State Tax Commission throughout the Progressive era, from 1901 until 1921. During that time he made the commission an important part of the Progressive movement. In 1915 Haugen helped preserve the law's strength by persuading Gov. Emanuel Philipp not to transfer collection activities from the commission to local governments. From 1919 until 1920, Haugen served as president of the National Tax Association, a nonpartisan, educational association that studies tax theory and public finance. Haugen was adviser to the State of Montana Board of Equalization from 1921 to 1923. He died April 23, 1931, in Madison, Wisconsin, where he was interred in Forest Hill Cemetery.

== Other sources ==
- Brandes, Stuart Dean. Nils P. Haugen and the Wisconsin Progressive Movement (Master's thesis, University of Wisconsin, 1925)
- Brøndal, Jørn. Ethnic Leadership and Midwestern Politics: Scandinavian Americans and the Progressive Movement in Wisconsin, 1890-1914. (Northfield, Minnesota: Norwegian-American Historical Association, 2004)
- Haugen, Nils Pederson. Pioneer and Political Reminiscences. (Evansville, Wis.: The Antes Press, 1930)

Wisconsin State Assembly
Preceded by Charles A. Hawn	Member of the Wisconsin State Assembly from the Pierce district January 6, 1879 – January 3, 1881	Succeeded by Franklin L. Gilson
U.S. House of Representatives
Preceded by Hugh H. Price	Member of the U.S. House of Representatives from Wisconsin's 8th congressional district March 4, 1887 - March 3, 1893	Succeeded by Lyman E. Barnes
Preceded by District Created	Member of the U.S. House of Representatives from Wisconsin's 10th congressional district March 4, 1893 - March 3, 1895	Succeeded by John J. Jenkins
