= Charles Elbert Whelan =

American politician

Mayor of Madison
- In office 1898–1899

Personal details
- Born: August 26, 1862
- Died: November 29, 1928 (aged 66)

Charles Elbert Whelan (1862–1928) was Mayor of Madison, Wisconsin, from 1898 to 1899.
