= Alfred W. Bareis =

American politician

Mayor of Madison, Wisconsin
- In office 1955–1956

Personal details
- Born: April 16, 1893 Dane County, Wisconsin, U.S.
- Died: August 7, 1976 (aged 83)
- Occupation: Politician

Alfred W. Bareis (born on April 16, 1893 in Dane County, Wisconsin, died on August 7, 1976) was Mayor of Madison, Wisconsin. He held the office from 1955 to 1956. Since 1932 he was a city clerk of the same city, and previously he had been a clothing salesman and a popular singer.
