= Moses Ransom Doyon =

American politician (1845–1933)

24th Mayor of Madison, Wisconsin
- In office 1888–1889
- Preceded by: James Conklin
- Succeeded by: Robert McKee Bashford

Personal details
- Born: December 18, 1845; Franklin, Vermont, U.S.
- Died: August 12, 1933 (aged 87)
- Spouse: Amelia Herrick (m. 1869)
- Occupation: Politician

Moses Ransom Doyon (December 18, 1845 – August 12, 1933) was an American politician who served as the 24th mayor of Madison, Wisconsin, from 1888 to 1889.

== Biography ==
Doyon was born on December 18, 1845, in Franklin, Vermont. He married Amelia Herrick on October 19, 1869. Doyon moved to Ironton, Wisconsin, in 1878. He moved to Madison in 1881. Doyon died on August 12, 1933.

His former home, known as the William T. Leitch House, is listed on the National Register of Historic Places. The house was also home to Madison Mayor William T. Leitch and U.S. Representative Nils P. Haugen.

== Career ==
Doyon was mayor from 1888 to 1890. He was elected in 1888 and reelected in 1889 as candidate of all political parties. Previously, he was a member of Board of Education of Madison.
