= William T. Leitch House =

Historic house in Wisconsin, United States

- U.S. National Register of Historic Places
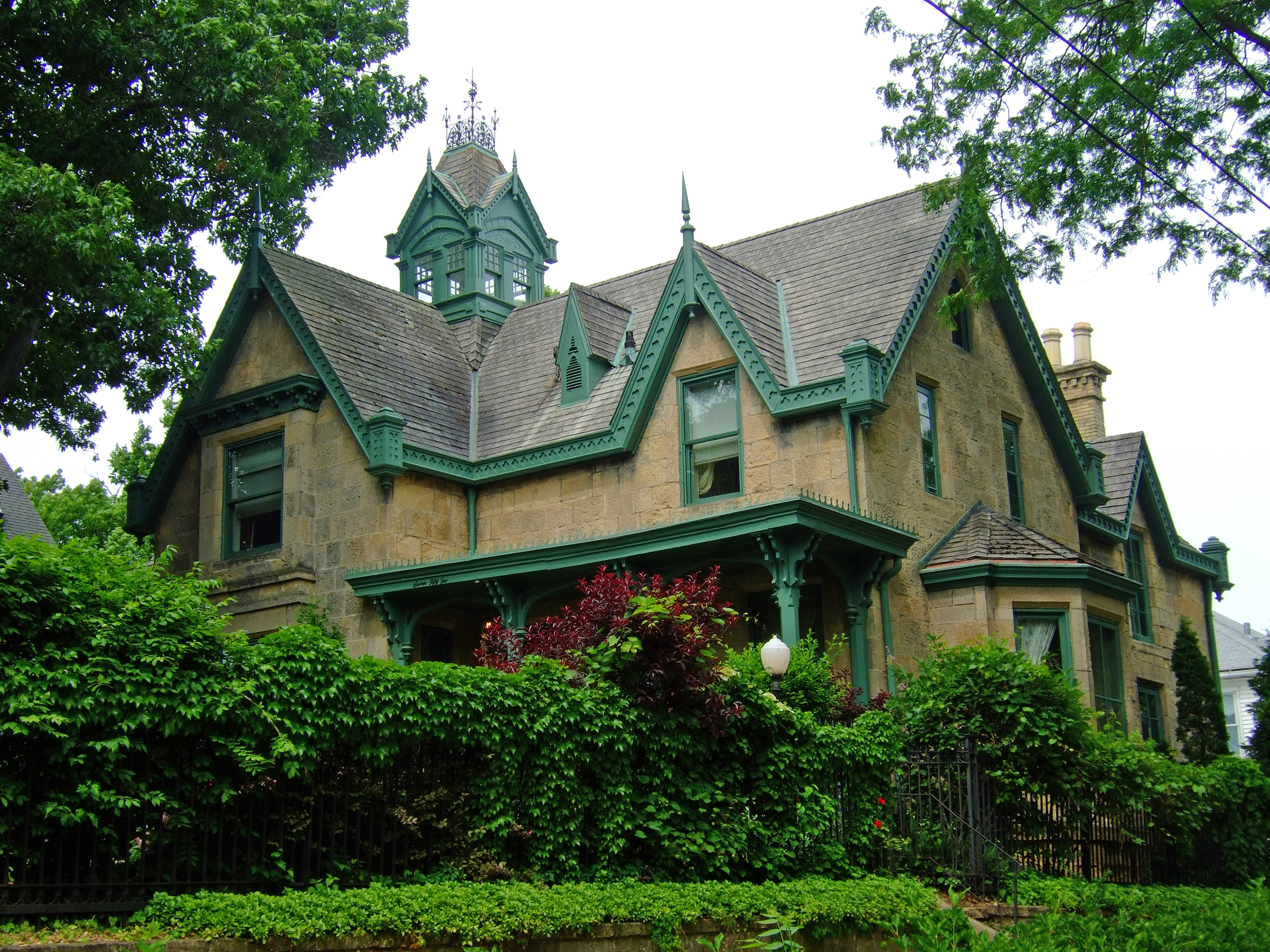

- Location within Wisconsin Location within the United States
- Location: 752 E. Gorham St. Madison, Wisconsin
- Coordinates: 43°5′2″N 89°22′45″W
- Built: 1857
- Architectural style: Gothic Revival
- NRHP reference No.: 75000061
- Added to NRHP: July 18, 1975

The William T. Leitch House is a well-preserved house built in 1857 a half mile northeast of the capitol square in Madison, Wisconsin, United States. In 1975 it was added to the National Register of Historic Places, as "the best example of mid-19th century Gothic Revival style" in Madison, and for its association with the city mayors and legislator who lived there.

== History ==
William T. Leitch immigrated from England to New York in 1829 where he became a clothier. Before he and his wife Jane came to Wisconsin in 1858, they commissioned this grand house.

Its style is Gothic Revival, and the design is attributed to August Kutzbock. Hallmarks of the style are the steep roof, the tall, narrow windows, and the finials on the peaks, all pointing upward. The decorated bargeboards are another hallmark. The walls of this particular house are clad in blocks of Madison sandstone, which was quarried in Westport and hauled across Lake Mendota on a barge. The bays of the front porches are framed in Tudor arches. Tall chimneys rise from the back of the slate roof, and a Gothic cupola rises from the point where the gables cross. The front door opens under an original etched glass transom. From there a spiral staircase ascends. The house contains nine fireplaces - some faced with marble, some with decorative tile, and some simple brick.

In 1862 William was elected mayor of Madison and served three terms. He also served as president of the school board and city assessor. When the Leitches sold the house in 1880, their notice in the Wisconsin State Journal described the house as "replete with every convenience for a comfortable and pleasant home. The stable, carriage house, cow house, etc., are all stone buildings. The grounds... are laid out in lawn, fruit, and vegetable gardens. The view of Fourth Lake is unsurpassed."

Moses Ransom Doyon and his wife Carolyn lived in the house from 1881 to 1902. Moses also served as mayor, in 1888 and 1889. He also served on the school board, and as alderman.

After the Doyons, Nils P. Haugen and his wife Bella lived in the house from 1902 to 1934. Nils was an attorney who served in the State Assembly in 1879 and 1880, then represented Wisconsin's 8th and 10th congressional district in the United States House of Representatives from 1887 to 1895. Nils was a prominent Progressive Era Republican and friend of Robert M. La Follette. Governor La Follete appointed him as a State Tax Commissioner, and Haugen served in that role for 20 years while living in this house. During that time, "Haugen won national renown as a tax expert and was a major figure in the implementation of Wisconsin's graduated income tax law."

Thea and Asher Hobson lived in the house after the Haugens. Asher was a prominent agricultural economist at the UW.

In 1972, the house was designated a landmark by the Madison Landmarks Commission. In 1975 it was added to the NRHP for its association with the civic leaders described above, and for its fine, well-preserved architecture.
