= Adolph H. Kayser =

American mayor

Adolph H. Kayser (January 28, 1851 – January 26, 1925) was mayor of Madison, Wisconsin, from 1914 to 1915.

Kayser was born in the village of Frechen, near Cologne, on the Rhine, in the Kingdom of Prussia, on Jan. 28, 1851. He was the son of Mr. and Mrs. Theodore Kayser. When four years old he came to America with his parents, who settled on a farm near Sauk City. Later the family moved to Madison. In 1881, Mr. Kayser married Hedwig Stein, daughter of the late Christian Stein. For a number of years he was associated with the C. P. Stein Lumber Co., which was incorporated as the A. H. Kayser Lumber Co. upon the death of Christian Stein.

Kayser was mayor of Madison for one term, from 1914 to 1916, succeeding John B. Heim, who was also his lifetime neighbor on East Gorham Street.

He died in 1925 at a local hospital after an illness of two months.

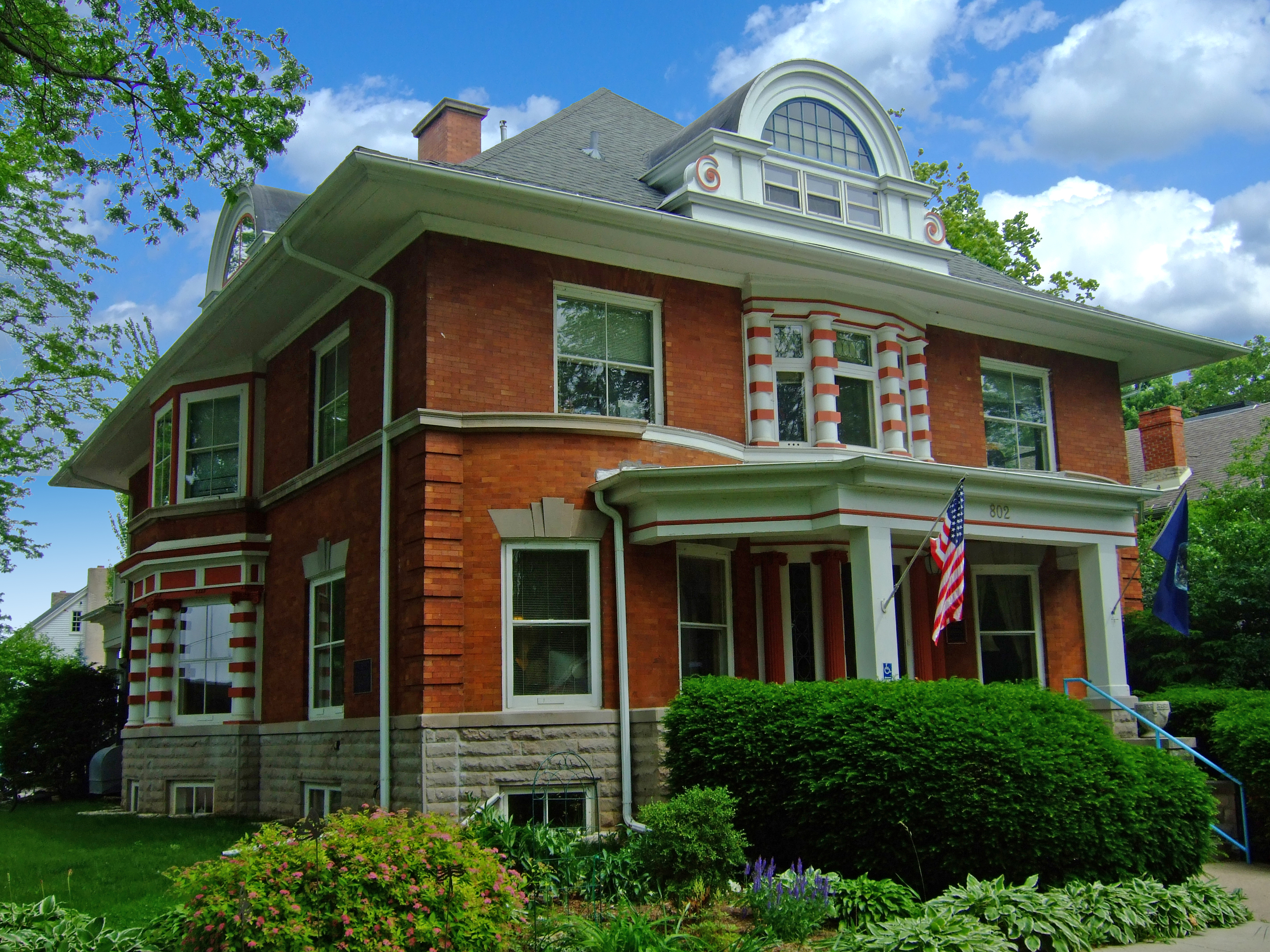
Kayser's 1902 house, both Prairie Style and Classical, designed by Claude & Starck

Kayser's home, the Adolph H. Kayser House, constructed in 1902, is at the intersection of East Gorham Street and North Livingston Street in Madison. It was designed by the architects Claude and Starck and is on the National Register of Historic Places.
