= William H. Rogers (mayor) =

American politician (1850–1935)

mayor of Madison, Wisconsin
- In office 1891–1893

Personal details
- Born: 1850
- Died: 1935 (aged 84–85)

William H. Rogers (1850–1935) was mayor of Madison, Wisconsin. He held the office from 1891 to 1893.
