= William T. Leitch =

American politician

William T. Leitch (1808–1885) was Mayor of Madison, Wisconsin from 1862 to 1865. His former house, known as the William T. Leitch House, is listed on the National Register of Historic Places. The house was also lived in by Madison Mayor Moses Ransom Doyon and U.S. Representative Nils P. Haugen.

== Photo gallery ==
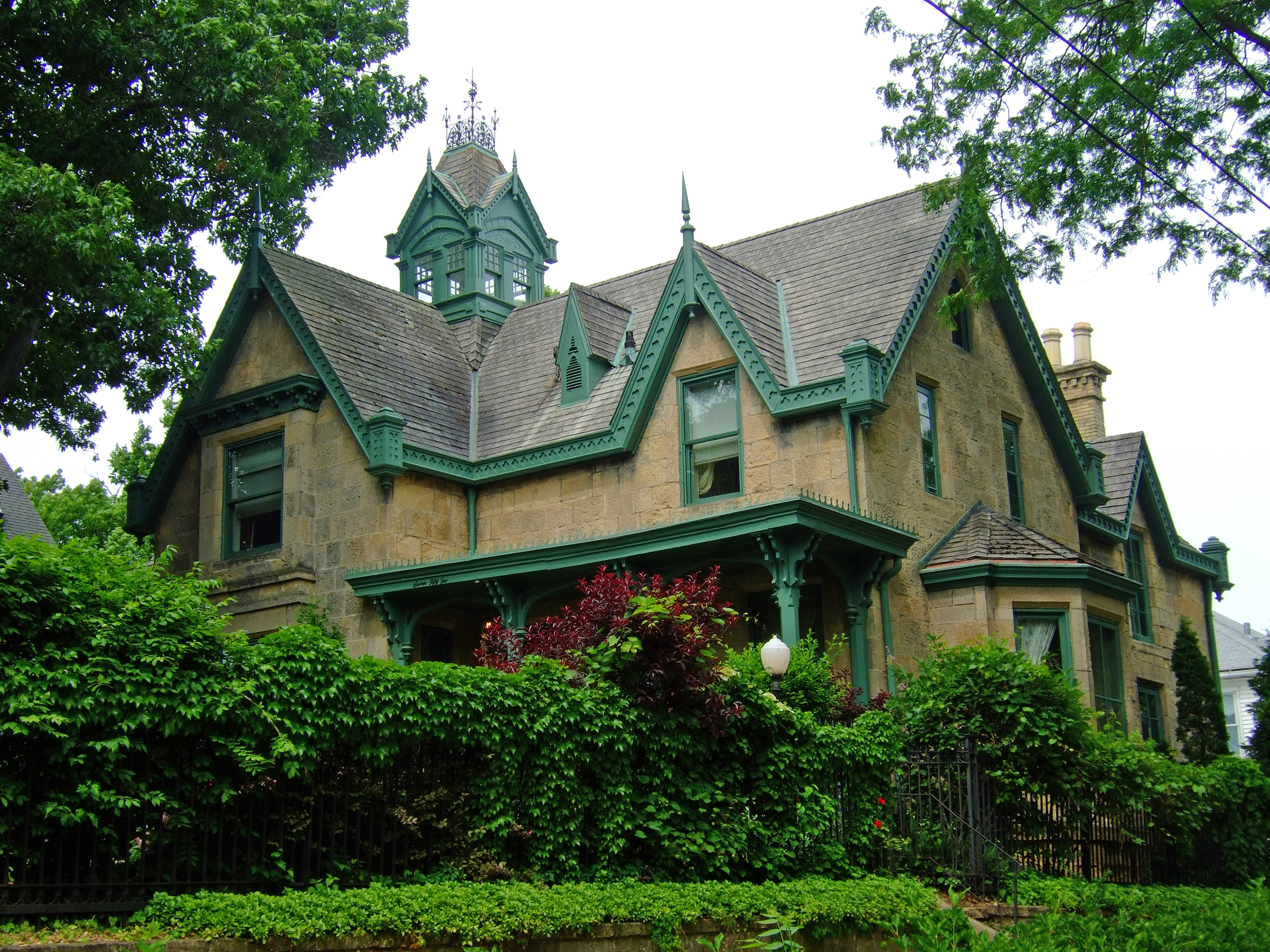
William T. Leitch House
