= Mathias J. Hoven =

American mayor

Mathias J. Hoven (July 9, 1850 – October 1, 1901), was twice mayor of Madison, Wisconsin, from 1897 to 1898 and from 1899 to 1901.
