= Henry Edward Reynolds =

American politician

Henry Edward Reynolds (1905–1980) was Mayor of Madison, Wisconsin. He held the office from 1961 to 1965.
