= Colleen Barros =

American government official

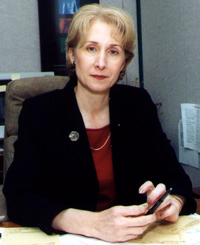

United States Deputy Secretary of Health and Human Services
- Acting
- In office January 20, 2017 – October 6, 2017
- President: Donald Trump
- Preceded by: Mary Wakefield (acting)
- Succeeded by: Eric Hargan

Personal details
- Education: American University (MA)

Colleen Barros is an American government official specialized in managing technical and scientific information systems and in research and development management. She served as the acting United States deputy secretary of health and human services from January 20, 2017, until October 6, 2017, before being succeeded by Eric Hargan. Barros served as the deputy for Norris Cochran (acting), Tom Price and Don J. Wright (acting).

Barros has also served as deputy director for management and chief financial officer for the National Institutes of Health.

== Life ==
Barros has an M.A. in Public Administration from the American University.

She began her career at the National Institutes of Health (NIH) in 1979 as a budget analyst. She served as a senior administrative officer in the NIH office of the director. She was responsible for directing the efforts in establishing several new offices such as the Office of AIDS Research, the Office of Human Genome Research, the Office of Research on Minority Health, and the Office of Alternative Medicine.

In 1995, Barros was selected as the associate director for administration in the National Institute on Aging (NIA) where she received several awards for her contributions toward improving the administrative operations of both the NIH and the NIA. She participated in several trans-NIH committees and projects including serving on the NIH Information Technology Central Committee responsible for advising the NIH Director on NIH information technology issues and as the NBRSS Project Leader responsible for the development and implementation of NIH's new business system.

In February 2004, Barros joined the NIH Office of the Director again as she took on the role of acting deputy director for management until May 30, when she was appointed deputy director for management and chief financial officer. Barros has expertise in managing technical and scientific information systems and in research and development management. While at NIH, in 2008 she won the Presidential Rank of Distinguished Executive Award, the 2003 Presidential Rank of Meritorious Executive Award, and 4 NIH Director's Awards.
