= C. D. Baker =

C. D. Baker may refer to:

- Charles Duncan Baker, a mayor of Las Vegas
- C. David Baker (born 1953), American football executive
- Charles D. Baker (attorney) (1846–1934), an Assistant United States Attorney
