= Bill Corr =

American government official and attorney (born 1948)

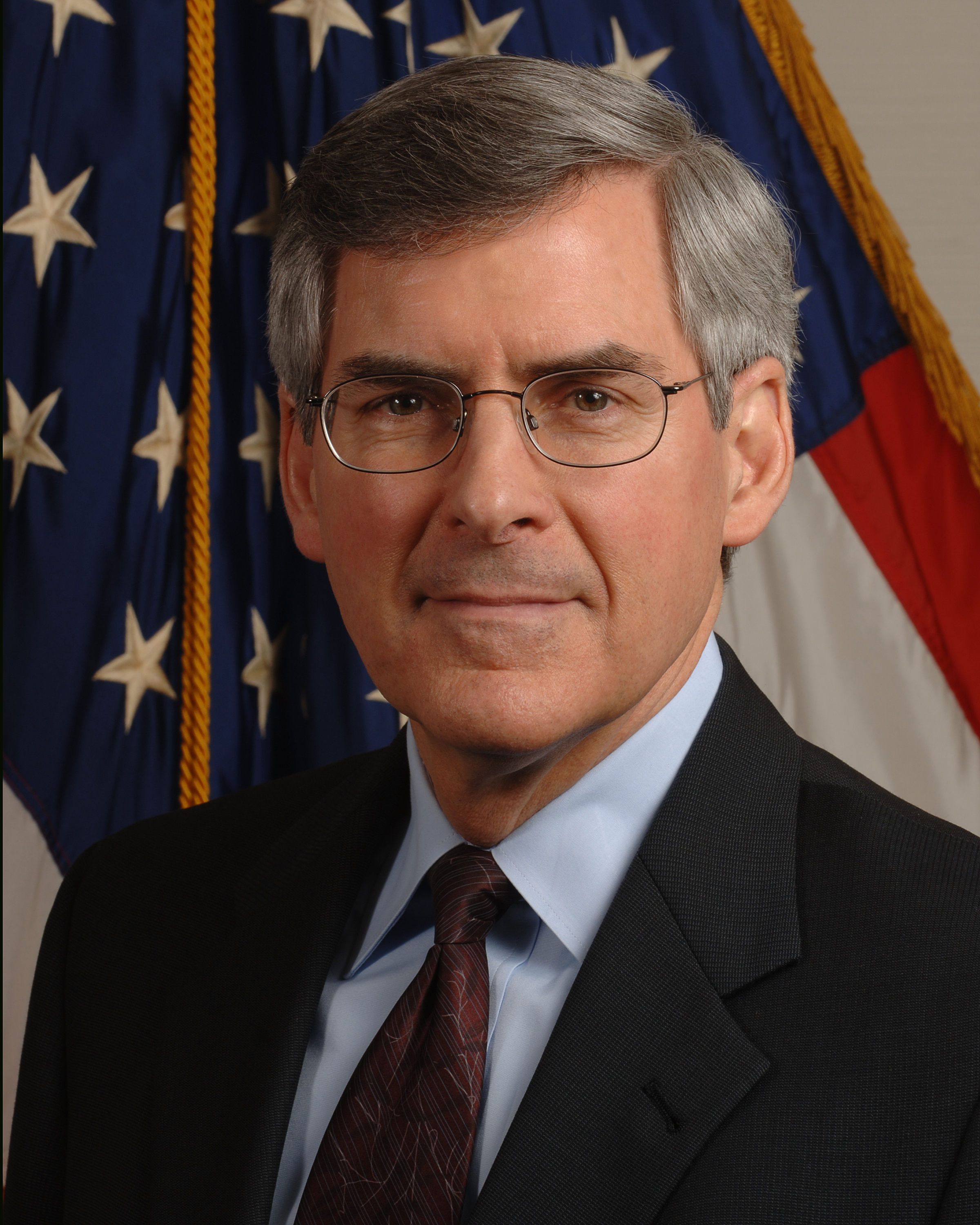
- Official portrait, 2011

22nd United States Deputy Secretary of Health and Human Services
- In office May 6, 2009 – April 2015
- President: Barack Obama
- Preceded by: Tevi Troy
- Succeeded by: Mary Wakefield

Personal details
- Born: William V. Corr; July 21, 1948 (age 78) Selma, Alabama, U.S.
- Party: Democratic
- Education: University of Virginia (BA); Vanderbilt University (JD)

William V. Corr (born July 21, 1948) is an American attorney and former government official. He served as Chief of Staff for the Secretary of Health and Human Services in the administration of President Bill Clinton and as Deputy Secretary of the United States Department of Health and Human Services in the administration of President Barack Obama from 2009 to 2015.

== Early life and education ==
Corr was born and raised in Selma, Alabama. He earned a Bachelor of Arts in economics from the University of Virginia and Juris Doctor from the Vanderbilt School of Law.

== Career ==
Corr served as counsel for the House Subcommittee on Health and the Environment of the House Committee on Commerce (later the House Committee on Energy & Commerce) beginning in approximately 1980. During his service, the subcommittee was first chaired by Representative Paul Rogers, a Democratic from Florida, and later by Representative Henry A. Waxman, a Democrat from California. There Corr helped develop legislation on a number of important health issues. He later served as chief counsel and staff director for the Subcommittee on Antitrust, Monopolies and Business Rights of the Senate Committee on the Judiciary from 1989 to 1993. From 1993 to 1996 he was Deputy Assistant Secretary for Health in the United States Department of Health and Human Services. He became Counselor to the Secretary in January 1996 and then Chief of Staff for the Department of Health and Human Services.

He served as chief counsel and policy director for former Senate majority leader, Tom Daschle (D-South Dakota) from 1998 to 2000.

On May 6, 2009 he was unanimously confirmed as United States Deputy Secretary of Health and Human Services by the United States Senate. He served until the end of Obama's era in January 20, 2017.

His appointment as Deputy Secretary was criticized by conservative publications because he worked as an anti-tobacco lobbyist as recently as September 2008, having been the executive director of the Campaign for Tobacco-Free Kids. In response to the criticism, Corr's spokesman said that in his new job, Corr would recuse himself from tobacco-related issues.

As Deputy Secretary of HHS, Corr was responsible for many of the day-to-day operations of the department, and among other duties, was the co-chair of the Health Care Fraud Prevention & Enforcement Action Team HEAT, a task force which ferrets out Medicare fraud.

He is now a Principal at Waxman Strategies in Washington, D.C. The organization lobbies and develops public outreach strategies on a variety of health and environmental issues.

Political offices
Preceded by Tevi Troy	United States Deputy Secretary of Health and Human Services; 2009–2015	Succeeded by Eric Hargan
