= Wilbur J. Cohen =

American social scientist

Wilbur Cohen
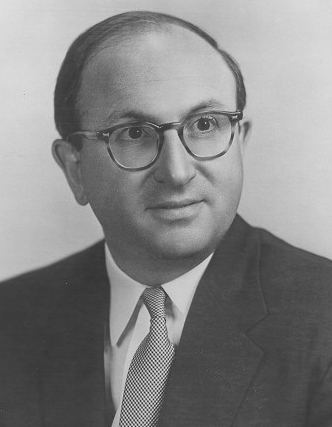

7th United States Secretary of Health, Education, and Welfare
- In office May 16, 1968 – January 20, 1969
- President: Lyndon B. Johnson
- Preceded by: John W. Gardner
- Succeeded by: Robert Finch

Under Secretary of Health, Education, and Welfare
- In office June 1965 – May 1968
- President: Lyndon B. Johnson
- Preceded by: Ivan A. Nestingen
- Succeeded by: James H. McCrocklin

Personal details
- Born: Wilbur Joseph Cohen; June 10, 1913 Milwaukee, Wisconsin, U.S.
- Died: May 17, 1987 (aged 73) Seoul, South Korea
- Party: Democratic
- Spouse: Eloise Bittel (m. 1938)
- Children: 3
- Education: University of Wisconsin, Madison (BA)
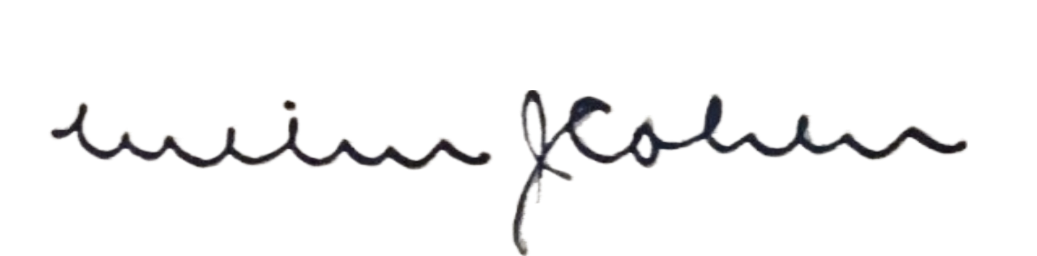
- Signature

Wilbur Joseph Cohen (June 10, 1913 – May 17, 1987) was an American social scientist and civil servant. He was one of the key architects in the creation and expansion of the American welfare state and was involved in the creation of both the New Deal and Great Society programs.

== Early life and career ==
Cohen was born in Milwaukee, Wisconsin, to Bessie (née Rubenstein) and Aaron Cohen. He was known to by several nicknames. He was once dubbed "The Man Who Built Medicare" and John F. Kennedy tagged him "Mr. Social Security", although it was Frances Perkins, the first woman Secretary of Labor (under FDR), who was the architect of social security. The New York Times called him "one of the country's foremost technicians in public welfare." Time portrayed him as a man of "boundless energy, infectious enthusiasm, and a drive for action." He was a leading expert on Social Security and a member of Americans for Democratic Action.

After graduating from the University of Wisconsin–Madison in 1934, Cohen moved to Washington, D.C. where he was a research assistant for the committee which drafted the Social Security Act.

On April 8, 1938, Cohen married Eloise Bittel. They had three sons: Christopher, Bruce and Stuart.

He was Director of the Bureau of Research and Statistics in charge of program development and legislative coordination with Congress for the Social Security Board (SSB), which was renamed the Social Security Administration in 1946.

== Kennedy and Johnson administrations ==
In 1961, President John F. Kennedy appointed Cohen as Assistant Secretary for Legislation of Health, Education, and Welfare. According to Christy Ford Chapin (Insuring America's Health: The Public Creation of the Corporate Health Care System p. 205) it was Cohen who, during the writing of Medicare legislation, "advised fellow reformers that partnering with insurance companies would create a politically palatable program"—with the result that America is today the only "developed" country with a for-private-profit health care system and without universal health care. Cohen was responsible for developing many of the details of Medicare and Medicaid.

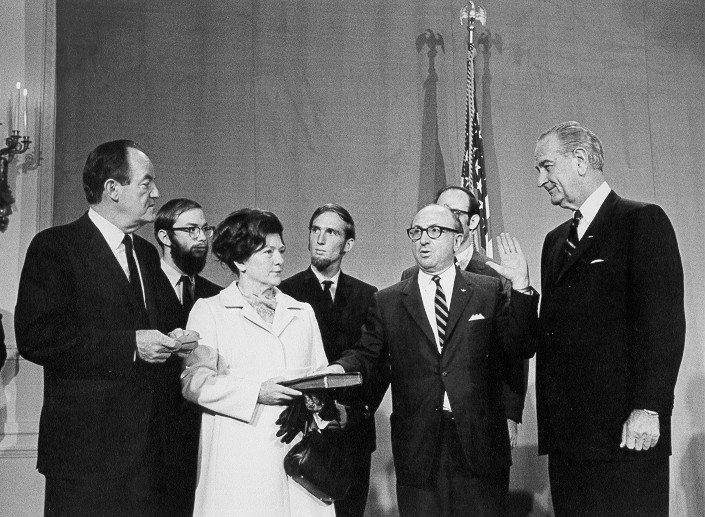
Cohen being sworn in as the Secretary of Health, Education and Welfare; from left to right: President Lyndon B. Johnson (far right), Vice-president Hubert H. Humphrey (far left), and the Eloise B. Cohen (right) and the three sons in 1968.

Nicholas Lemann (The Promised Land: The Great Black Migration and How It Changed America p. 131 & 143) describes Cohen as "a first-generation New Deal social welfare planner [who] was deputy secretary but the real power in the Department of Health, Education and Welfare" and "an old friend of [Lyndon] Johnson." President Lyndon B. Johnson elevated him to Under Secretary in 1965, and he served as the U.S. Secretary of Health, Education, and Welfare from May 1968 to the end of Johnson's term, following the resignation of John W. Gardner. With a tenure of 249 days, Cohen became the shortest-ever secretary of that department, as the office was succeeded by the U.S. Secretary of Health and Human Services in 1980.

== Later life and death ==
In 1969, Cohen retired at the end of a Johnson's administration. In 1970, Cohen served as the president of the American Public Welfare Association (renamed the American Public Human Services Association in 1997). In 1971, Cohen was elected to the Common Cause National Governing Board. In 1980 Cohen became a professor of Public Affairs at the University of Texas at Austin.

The University of Michigan in Ann Arbor, where Cohen was a professor of Public Welfare Administration and lived for many years, established the Wilbur J. Cohen Collegiate Professor of Social Work professorship in his honor.

He died while attending a gerontology conference in Seoul, South Korea, on May 17, 1987. He is interred at Garden of Memories Cemetery in Kerrville, Texas.

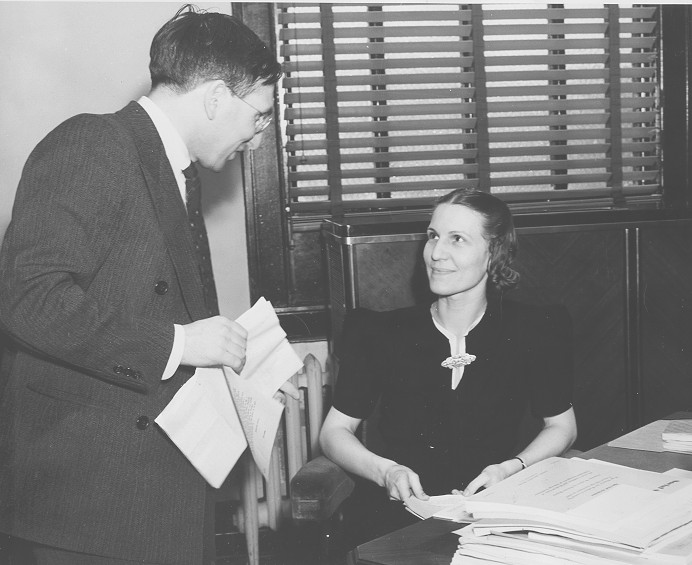
Cohen in the early days of Social Security with Maurine Mulliner, who was the executive secretary of the Social Security Board in 1935.

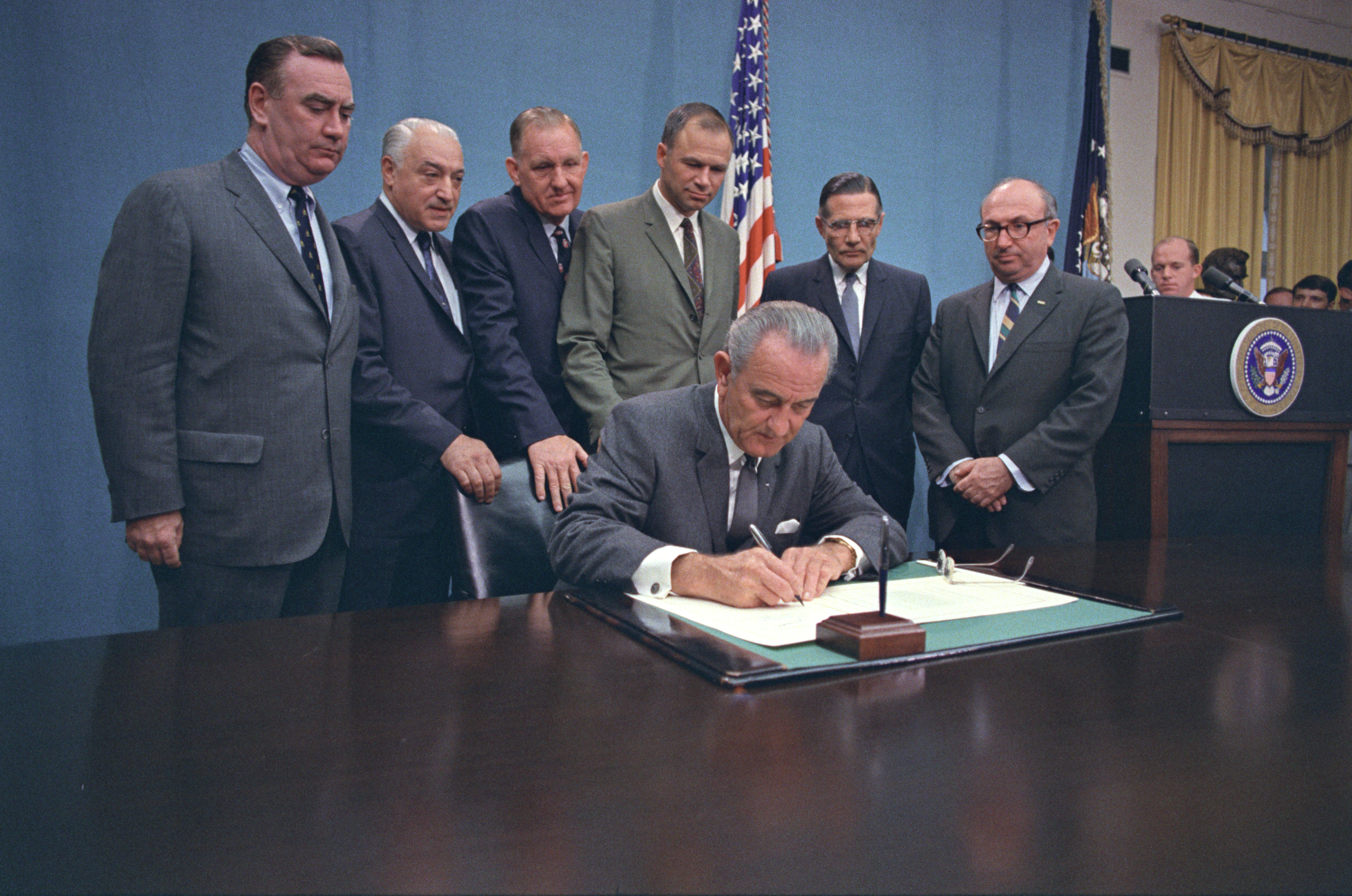
President Johnson signs a bill authorizing education programs for children with disabilities; from left to right: Hugh L. Carey, Dominick V. Daniels, Carl D. Perkins, Albert H. Quie, Winston L. Prouty, Cohen (1968)

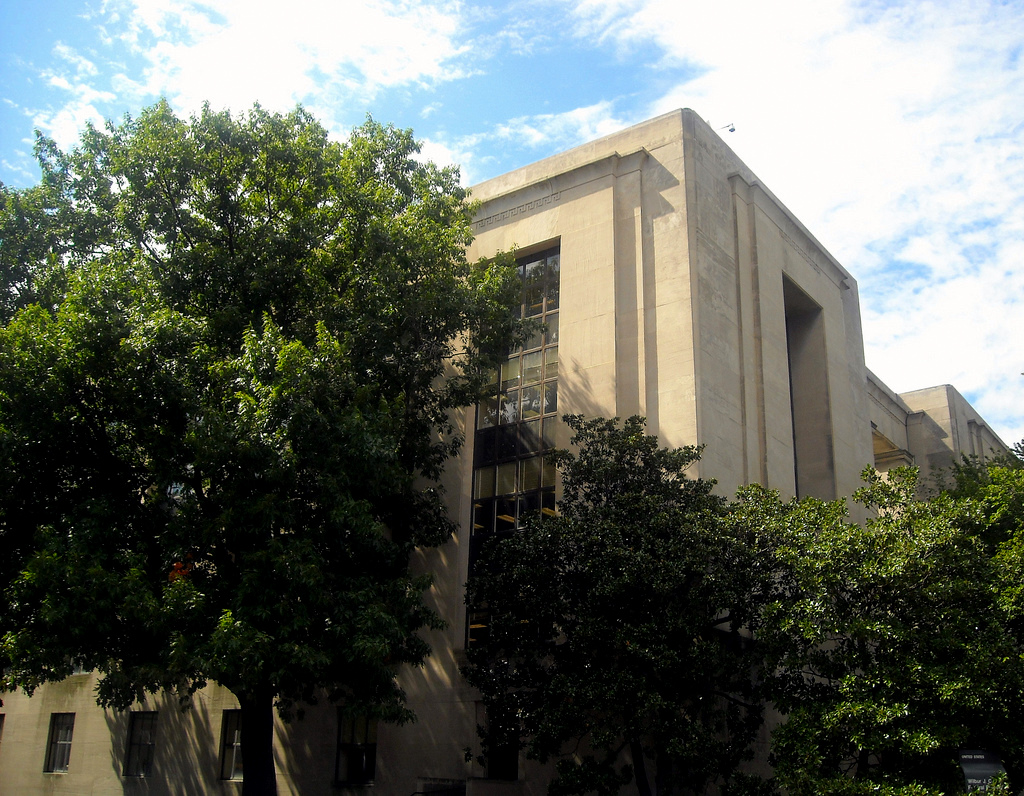
The Wilbur J. Cohen Building at the current US Department of Health and Human Services in Washington, D.C.

== See also ==
- List of Jewish United States Cabinet members

== Books ==
- The Elimination of Poverty in the United States. Wilbur J. Cohen, 1963.
- The Roosevelt New Deal: A Program Assessment Fifty Years After. Wilbur J. Cohen. Austin, Texas: University of Texas Press. 1986 paperback edition: ISBN 0-89940-416-2, ISBN 978-0-89940-416-5.
- Social Security: Universal or Selective? Wilbur J. Cohen and Milton Friedman, co-authors. Washington: American Enterprise Institute for Public Policy Research. 1972.
- Unemployment Insurance in the United States: The First Half Century. Saul J. Blaustein, Wilbur J. Cohen, William Haber, co-authors. Kalamazoo, Michigan: W. E. Upjohn Institute for Employment Research. 1993 hardcover edition: ISBN 0-88099-136-4, ISBN 978-0-88099-136-0.

Biography

- Wilbur J. Cohen: the pursuit of power; a bureaucratic biography. Marjorie O'Connell Shearon. Shearon Legislative Service. 1967.
- Mr. Social Security: The Life of Wilbur J. Cohen. Edward D. Berkowitz. Lawrence, Kansas: University Press of Kansas. 1995 hardcover edition: ISBN 0-7006-0707-2, ISBN 978-0-7006-0707-5.

Political offices
Preceded by John W. Gardner	United States Secretary of Health, Education, and Welfare; 1968–1969	Succeeded by Robert Finch
