= Andrea Palm =

American health advisor (born 1973)

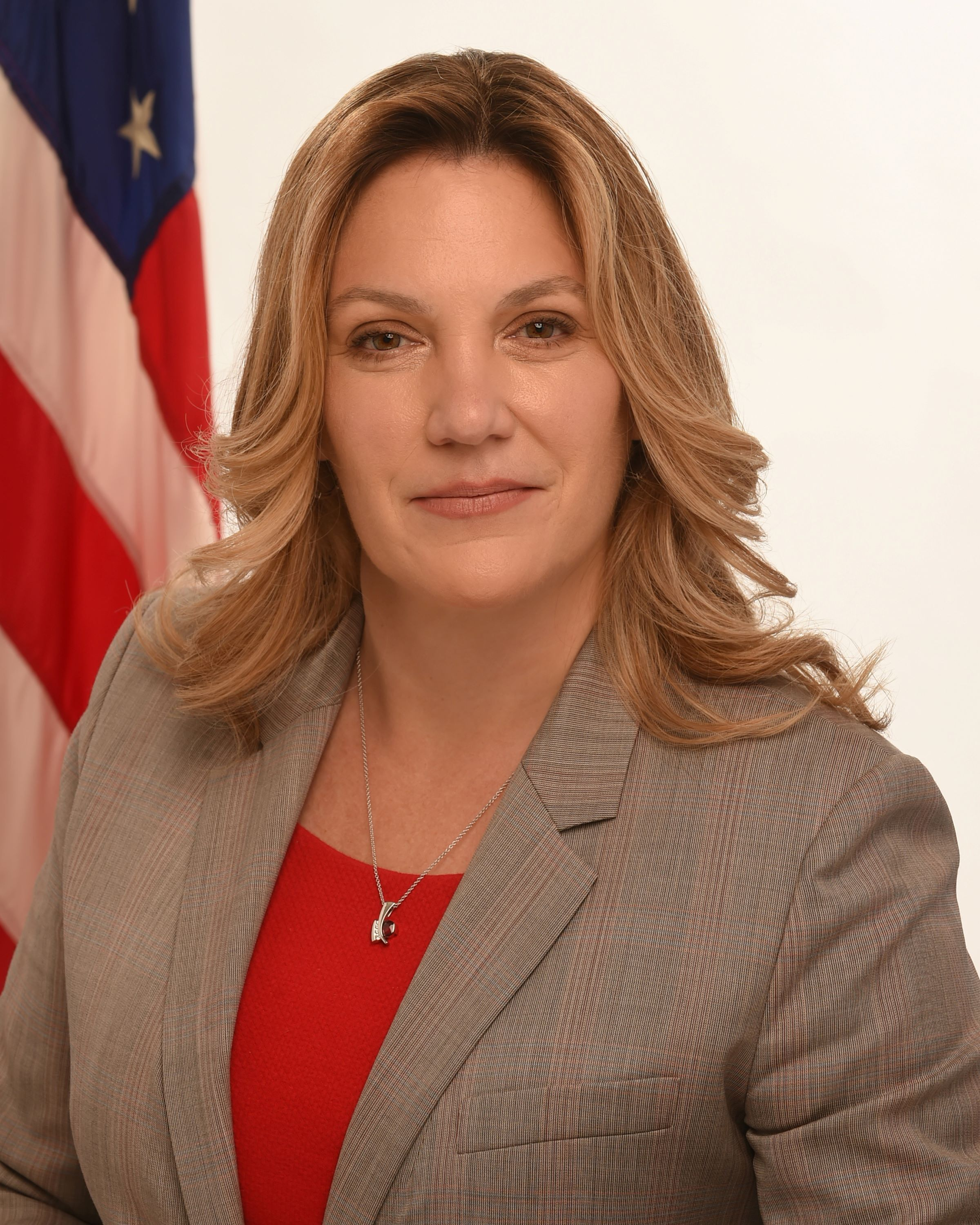
- Official portrait, 2022

24th United States Deputy Secretary of Health and Human Services
- In office May 12, 2021 – January 20, 2025
- President: Joe Biden
- Preceded by: Eric Hargan
- Succeeded by: Jim O'Neill

Secretary of the Wisconsin Department of Health Services
- Acting as designee
- In office January 7, 2019 – January 20, 2021
- Governor: Tony Evers
- Preceded by: Linda Seemeyer
- Succeeded by: Karen Timberlake (acting)

Personal details
- Born: Andrea Joan Palm; 1973 (age 52–53) Star Lake, New York, U.S.
- Party: Democratic
- Spouse: Dan Utech (m. 2012)
- Education: Cornell University (BS); Washington University (MSW)

Andrea Joan Palm (born 1973) is an American government health advisor who served as the United States deputy secretary of health and human services in the Biden administration from 2021 to 2025. Previously, Palm served as secretary-designee of the Wisconsin Department of Health Services from 2019 to 2021 in the administration of Governor Tony Evers, an office she was never sworn into due to Republican opposition in the Wisconsin Senate.

She worked as a senior staffer in the U.S. Department of Health and Human Services and as a White House policy advisor during the presidency of Barack Obama. She was an aide to Hillary Clinton during her time in the United States Senate.

== Early life and education ==
Palm was born and raised in Star Lake, New York. She earned a Bachelor of Science degree in human services studies from Cornell University and Master of Social Work from the Washington University in St. Louis.

== Career ==
Palm began her career as a legislative assistant for California congressman Bob Matsui. She then worked as a health policy advisor to then-U.S. senator Hillary Clinton. In 2009, Palm was appointed deputy assistant United States secretary of health and human services for legislation by President Barack Obama. Since the role of assistant secretary for legislation was vacant, she served as acting assistant secretary during that time. Palm then served as a policy advisor to the United States Domestic Policy Council at the White House. She re-joined the Department of Health and Human Services to serve as an advisor to the assistant secretary for health and chief of staff of the HHS.

=== Wisconsin DHS ===
In January 2019, governor-elect Tony Evers nominated Palm to serve as secretary of the Wisconsin Department of Health Services. Palm and other Evers-nominated cabinet secretaries began performing their duties while their confirmation hearings were pending. Palm's nomination stalled in the Republican-controlled Wisconsin legislature, with members citing Palm's decision to name a former Planned Parenthood lobbyist as her deputy. State senate majority leader Scott L. Fitzgerald blocked Palm's nomination from appearing before a full Senate vote.

==== COVID-19 response ====
While still acting as secretary-designate, Palm was tasked with managing Wisconsin's response to the COVID-19 pandemic. Various mayors requested that Palm use emergency authorities as secretary to mail ballots to every registered voter, so as not to require voters to cast ballots in person in the April 2020 primary election. Governor Tony Evers signed an executive order for all-mail-in election, but the order was rejected by the Republican-controlled Wisconsin legislature.

In March 2020, in order to slow the transmission of COVID-19, Governor Evers issued an order restricting nonessential travel and the operation of nonessential businesses. The order expired in late April 2020, but on May 26, 2020, Palm extended the order at Evers' direction. Republican state legislators sued Palm, seeking to strike down her order. Palm's updated stay-at-home order was struck down in a ruling by the conservative-controlled Wisconsin Supreme Court, effectively reopening several businesses in the state against warnings by public health officials. In the 4–3 decision, the Court ruled that while Evers had emergency powers authority, Palm did not.

=== Biden administration ===
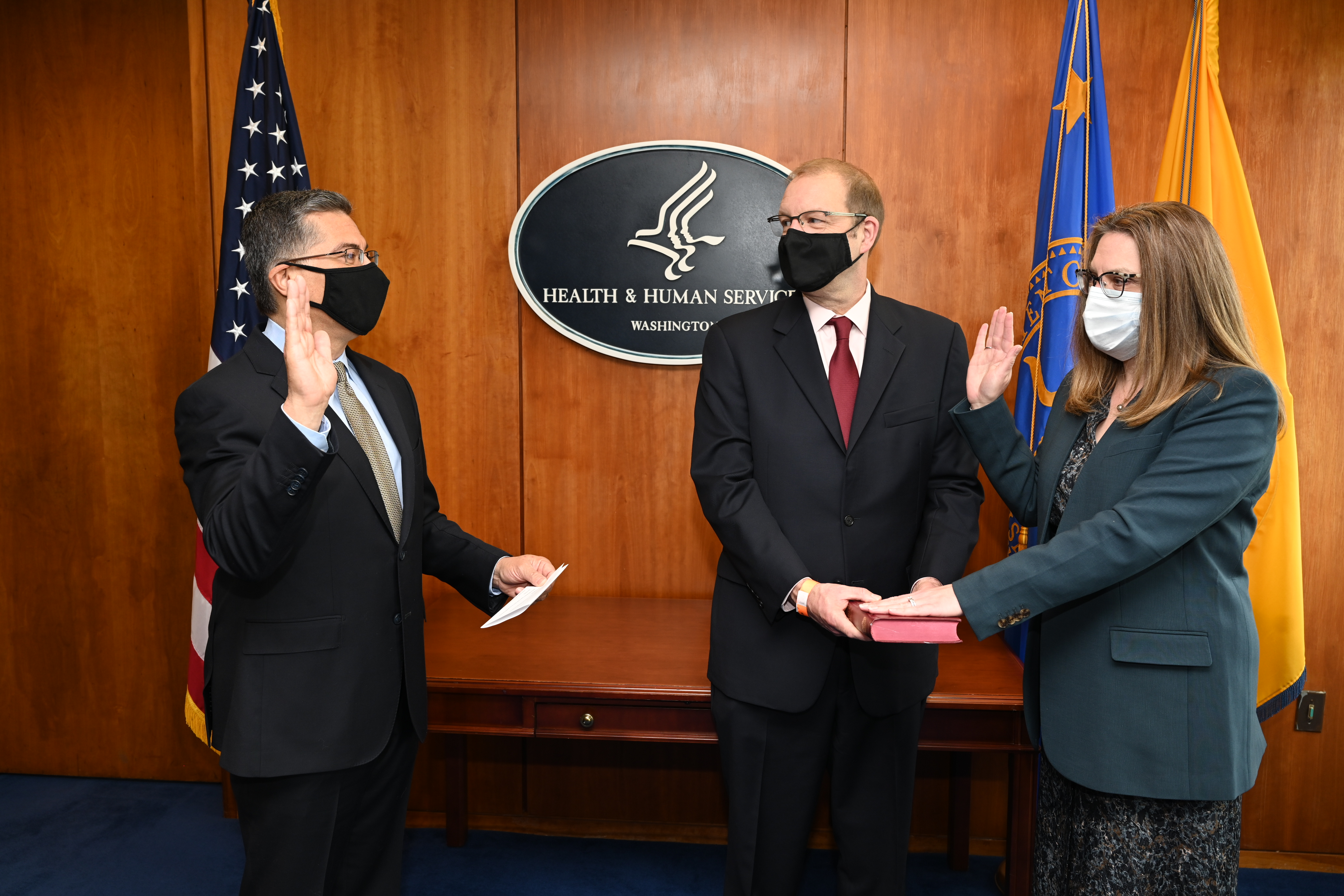
Palm is sworn in as deputy secretary of health and human services by Secretary Xavier Becerra on May 12, 2021.

On January 18, 2021, it was announced that Palm would be nominated to serve as United States deputy secretary of health and human services in the incoming Biden administration. Palm subsequently announced that her last day at the Wisconsin Department of Health Services would be January 20, 2021. Her nomination to be deputy secretary of health and human services was submitted to the United States Senate on February 22, 2021. On May 11, 2021, by a vote of 61-37, the U.S. Senate confirmed her nomination. She was sworn in by HHS Secretary Xavier Becerra on May 12.

== Personal life ==
Palm is married to Dan Utech, a former advisor in the United States Department of Energy and United States Domestic Policy Council. Utech later served as deputy assistant to Barack Obama for energy and climate change before becoming a lecturer at the Yale School of Forestry & Environmental Studies.

Political offices
Preceded by Eric Hargan	United States Deputy Secretary of Health and Human Services; 2021–2025	Succeeded by Jim O'Neill
