= Marjorie Lynch =

American politician (1920–1977)

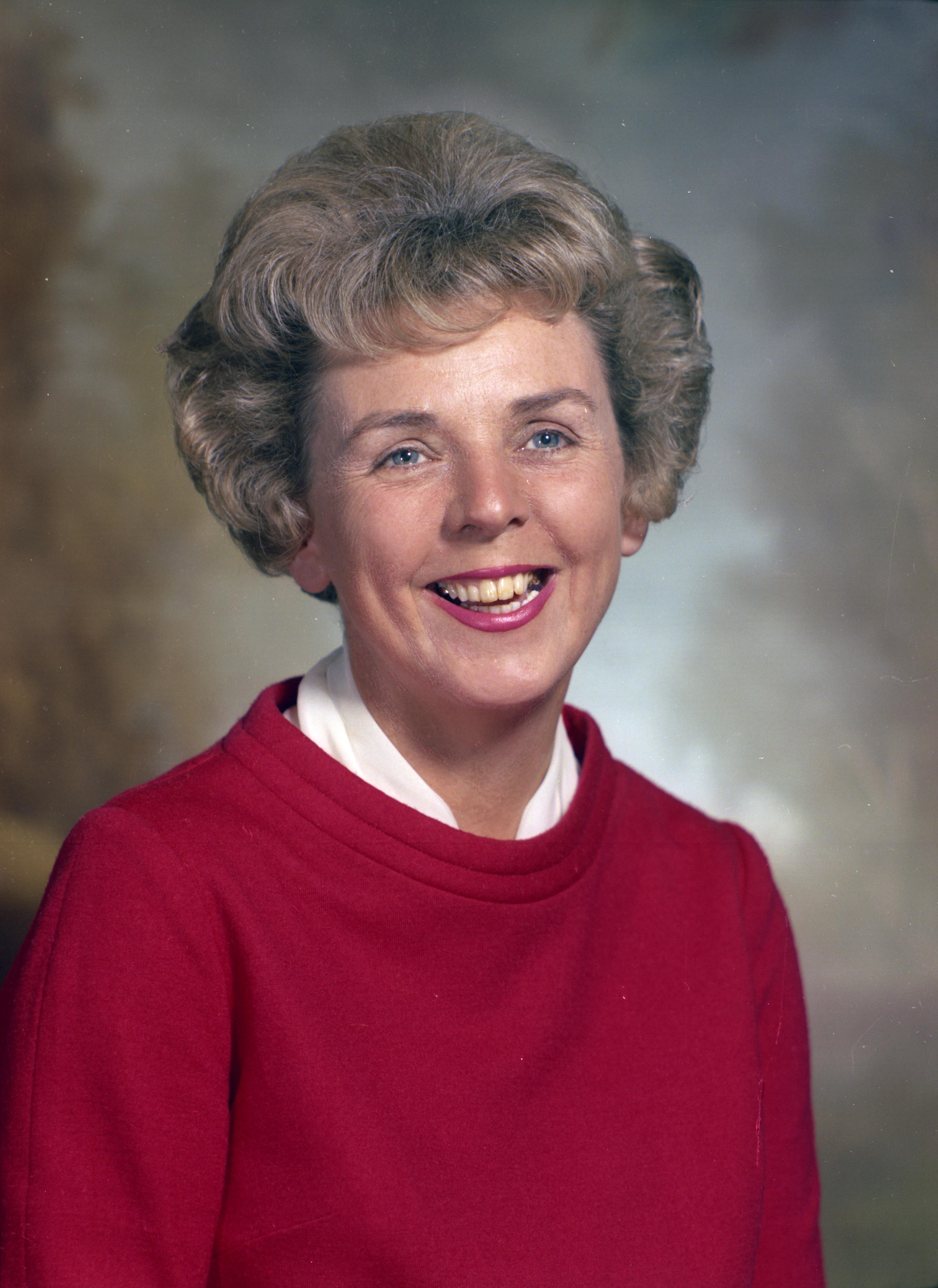
- Lynch in 1967

United States Undersecretary of Health, Education, and Welfare
- In office November 1975 – January 1977
- President: Gerald Ford
- Preceded by: Frank Carlucci
- Succeeded by: Hale Champion

Member of the Washington House of Representatives from the 14th district
- In office 1962–1971 Serving with: Stanley Pence (1962–1963); Ed Morrissey (1962–1965); Robert F. Brachtenbach (1963–1967); Robert Kull (1965–1967)
- Preceded by: Lincoln E. Shropshire
- Succeeded by: Donald G. Garrett

Personal details
- Born: November 30, 1920 London, England
- Died: November 8, 1977 (aged 56) Tacoma, Washington, U.S.
- Citizenship: United Kingdom; United States
- Party: Republican

Marjorie Lynch (née Ward; November 30, 1920 – November 8, 1977) was a British-born American politician. She served as a Republican in the Washington House of Representatives for the 14th legislative district for ten years, between 1961 and 1971. She was deputy administrator of the American Revolution Bicentennial Administration between January 1975 and November 1975, when she was appointed as undersecretary of the Department of Health, Education, and Welfare.

Born in London, England, Lynch served in the Women's Auxiliary Air Force during World War II at Biggin Hill, Kent, before joining the American Red Cross in 1943. While in Paris with the organization, she met Edward Donald Lynch, a medical officer with the United States Army, and following their wedding in 1945, moved to his hometown of Yakima, Washington. She became involved in civic life in her new country and was appointed to the Washington House of Representatives in 1961. While in the legislature, she chaired the committee on higher education between 1963 and 1968 and sponsored the bills which established the state community college system and Evergreen State College.

Lynch resigned from the House in 1971 to join ACTION, a federal agency focused on volunteerism, as a regional director. She was promoted to associate director of the agency's domestic and anti-poverty operations, causing her to move to Washington, D.C. She was nominated as deputy administrator of the American Revolution Bicentennial Administration in 1974, and although her nomination was initially opposed by the Daughters of the American Revolution on account of her British background, she ultimately served in the position for eleven months. She was appointed as the undersecretary of the Department of Health, Education, and Welfare in 1975, where she took responsibility for the day-to-day management of the department. She resigned in March 1977 to join the University of Alabama as associate vice president but died of cancer after only a few months in the role.

== Early life ==
Lynch was born Marjorie Ward on November 20, 1920, in London, England. Her father, Geoffrey Ward, was a Canadian immigrant who became a Conservative alderman in the borough of Croydon. Her mother was active in the community. She had a brother, Roy Ward, and a sister, Daphne Hall. Lynch assisted in running a youth club in the London slums when she was 16. In 1939, when she was 18, she volunteered with the Women's Auxiliary Air Force and became a first lieutenant in the Royal Air Force by the time she left in 1945. She was stationed at Biggin Hill, Kent, where she worked as an administrative officer and served as an assistant to Group Captain A. G. Malan and met Winston Churchill on several occasions. The base was often bombed by German planes, including during the Battle of Britain, and in 1943, Lynch joined the American Red Cross (ARC) as a home service worker.

She served in London and Paris, where she met her future husband, Dr. Edward Donald Lynch, on Christmas Day in 1944. The couple married the next April and, with encouragement from her parents, Lynch followed her husband, a United States Army medical officer, back to his hometown of Yakima, Washington, in 1945. Although initially hesitant about life in the United States, Lynch quickly became involved with the local community. She re-joined the ARC and became involved with community initiatives focused on health and education. Three years after arriving in the country, she was naturalized as an American citizen. Lynch and her husband had three daughters by 1954: Valerie, Daphne, and Theresa. They later divorced.

== Political career ==
Lynch became involved in civic organizations and local politics in her new town, having first been appointed as chair of Citizens for Eisenhower in 1952. She was a member of the Yakima Chamber of Commerce and the president of the woman's auxiliary to the Washington State Medical Association. She served on the board of the Washington State Mental Health Association, United Good Neighbors, and the Washington State Heart Association. She held every position in the Washington State Republican Party, including vice chair of the Yakima County Republican Club, vice president of the Women's Federation of Washington State Republican Club, and vice chair of the Washington State Republican Central Committee between 1961 and 1962.

=== Washington House of Representatives ===
In December 1961, she was appointed to the Washington House of Representatives for the 14th legislative district to serve the remainder of the term for resigning representative Lincoln Shropshire. She won re-election in 1962, when she was appointed as vice chair of the medicine, dentistry and drugs committee and a member of the commerce and economic development committee, the public institutions committee, and the social security and public assistance committee. She sponsored two bills during the session which were signed by Governor Albert Rosellini: HB257, which refunded some college fees, and HB394, which allowed state colleges to confer associate degrees in nursing.

She was re-elected in the 1964 election and was appointed as a member of the commerce and economic development committee, the medicine, dentistry and drugs committee, the public institutions and youth development committee, and the higher education committee. She was chosen to chair the House committee on higher education between 1963 and 1968, an appointment which fit well with her legislative focus on education. In 1969, Lynch introduced several bills in the area of healthcare, including HB329 to create a new department of social and health services and a bill to allow minors to receive treatment for venereal diseases without parental consent. She sponsored HB296, which specified the duties of the Department of Public Assistance concerning child welfare, and HB647, which allowed the state to participate in federal mental disability and mental health care programs.

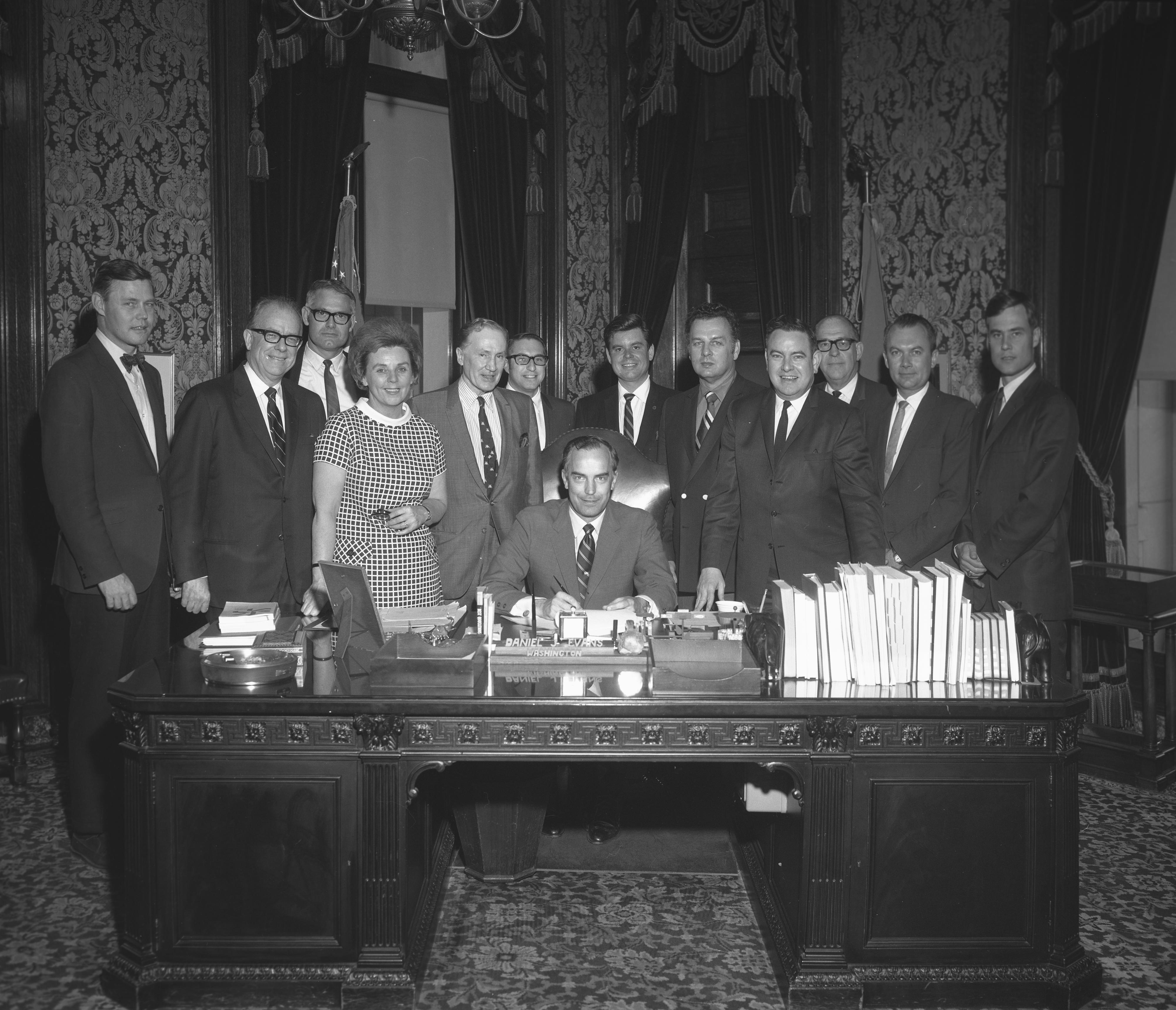
Lynch with Governor Daniel J. Evans as he signs HB635 in 1969

Following the 1966 election, Lynch was appointed to the appropriations and public institutions and youth development committees. As the prime sponsor of the 1967 bill which created the Washington state community college system, she was actively involved in the foundation of Evergreen State College. Lynch also assisted in creating mandatory education and group homes for mentally handicapped people. In 1970, she won re-election against Democrat Thomas S. Hallahan with 10,665 votes compared to his 7,072. She was a member of the appropriations committee and the social and health services committee. She supported Referendum 20, to legalize abortion while still early in a pregnancy.

Lynch served as chair of the higher education subcommittee of appropriations and the senior member of the appropriations committee. She was a member of the executive committee and the mental health council of the Western Interstate Commission for Higher Education and commissioner of the Education Commission of the States. She was a member of the Governor's Advisory Council of Mental Health and Mental Retardation. She supported farmers’ rights and lowering property taxes. Following her resignation, her position in the legislature for the 14th district was filled by fellow Republican Donald Garrett.

=== ACTION ===
In December 1971, Lynch resigned from the state legislature to join ACTION, a federal agency founded by President Richard Nixon that same year to encourage private sector volunteerism, as the organization's Northwest regional director. She was sworn in on January 12, 1971, in Washington, D.C. For two years, she ran the Peace Corps, Volunteers in Service to America, and Service Corps of Retired Executives programs in region 10, which included the states of Washington, Oregon, Idaho, and Alaska. She served as the acting associate director of the agency's domestic and anti-poverty operations from June 1973, before being nominated by Nixon to the permanent position in September 1973. Lynch was confirmed by the U.S. Senate in October 1973 and moved to Washington, D.C. to carry out the role. She had responsibility for 400 employees of the agency and 100,000 volunteers.

=== American Revolution Bicentennial Administration ===
Lynch was nominated by President Gerald Ford, who took over for Nixon following the Watergate scandal, to the position of deputy administrator of the American Revolution Bicentennial Administration (ARBA) on October 2, 1974. The administration was tasked with planning a ceremony to celebrate the 200th anniversary of the founding of the United States. She was assumed to be a safe nominee due to her popularity in the Republican party, but her confirmation was threatened by a protest mounted by the Daughters of the American Revolution (DAR). The organization opposed her nomination because she was born in Britain, and did not come to the United States until after World War II. Lynch received widespread support, including receiving public statements of support from Governor Dan Evans, Senator Warren Magnuson, and Senator Henry Jackson, Washington state politicians from both parties. Jackson described her as the embodiment of the American dream during the congressional debate. Lynch spoke at the hearing, stating "the tenets of American democracy are particularly cherished when you are not born to them but with deliberation and conviction adopt them for your own."

Lynch was finally confirmed to the position on the third attempt, being approved by the Senate Judiciary Committee on December 17, 1974, without any dissenting votes and by the Senate on December 18, 1974. She was sworn in on January 24, 1975, by Vice-President Nelson Rockefeller. In the position, she was tasked with assisting John Warner, the ARBA administrator, in organizing a series of events between March 1975 and December 1976. She was in charge of personnel and administration, as well as dispensing the annual $10 million budget. She later repaired relationships with the DAR and was invited to present the bicentennial flag at their 1975 national convention.

=== Department of Health, Education and Welfare ===
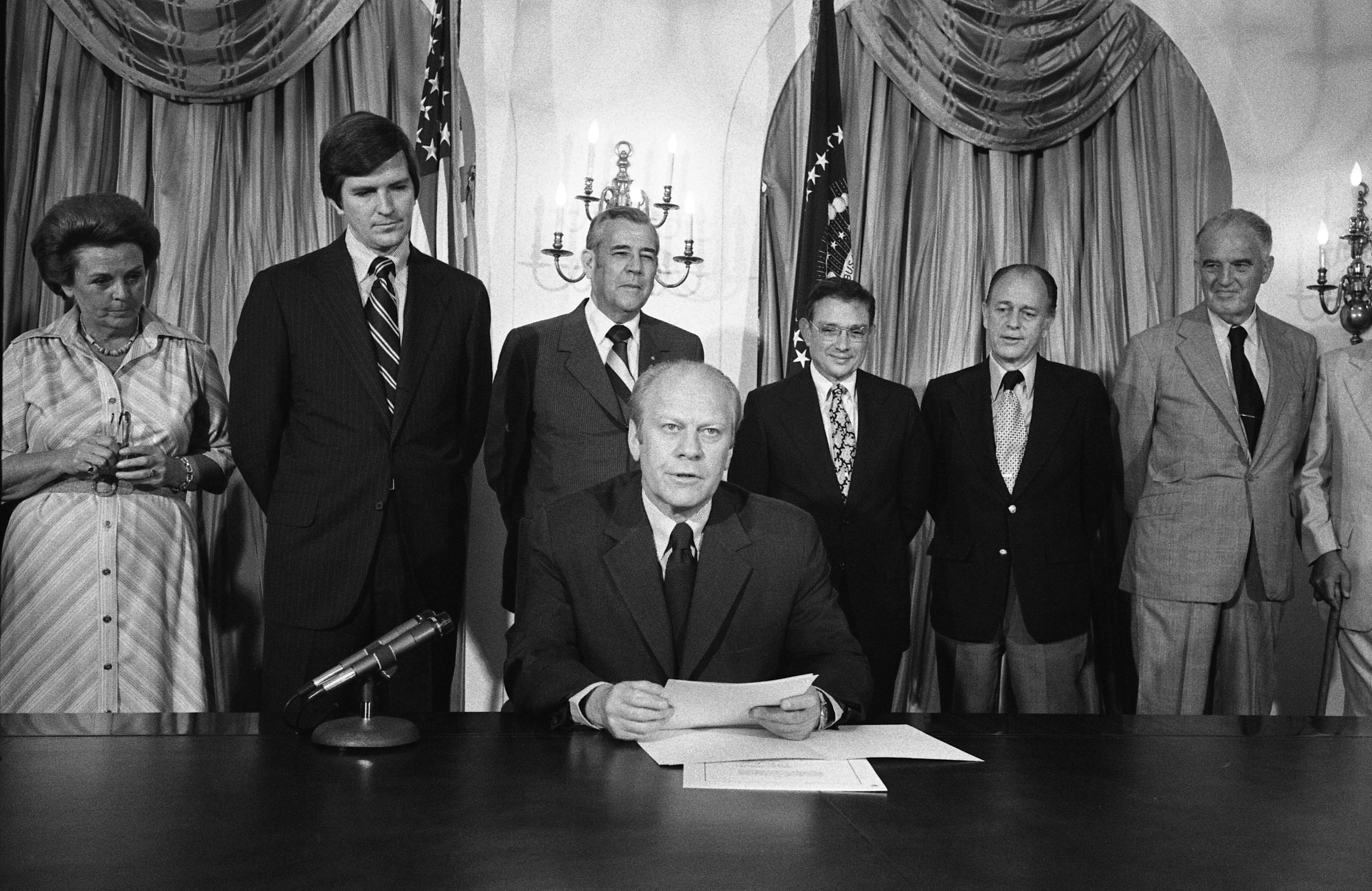
Lynch (far left) with President Gerald Ford in 1976

After eleven months in her role with the Bicentennial Administration, Ford appointed Lynch as the undersecretary of the U.S. Department of Health, Education, and Welfare (HEW). She was sworn in to the position on November 13, 1975, becoming the second woman to hold the position after Bertha Adkins. The HEW secretary, F. David Mathews, put her in charge of the routine operations of the department, including its $120 billion budget and 140,000 employees, and its relations with state and local officials. She was additionally tasked with simplifying the agency's pre-existing rules and regulations. She was the second-highest-ranking woman in the Ford administration, ranking behind only Carla Hills, the Secretary of Housing and Urban Development. She lost her position at HEW following the election of President Jimmy Carter, but was kept on as a consultant.

== Later life and legacy ==
In March 1977, Lynch joined the University of Alabama in Tuscaloosa, Alabama, as associate vice president with responsibility for continuing education and off-campus programs. She had cancer and died on November 8, 1977, in Tacoma, Washington. Throughout her life, she was honored with various awards, including the 1961 Women of Achievement Award from the Business and Professional Women's Foundation, the 1967 Citation for Meritorious Service from the American Legion Auxiliary, the 1968 P.T.A. Golden Acorn Award for Service to Children and Youth, and the 1976 Phillips Medal from the Ohio University College of Osteopathic Medicine. The University of Alabama created the Marjorie Ward Lynch Memorial Scholarship in her honor. Her papers are held at the Yakima Valley Museum.
