= Charles D. Baker (businessman) =

American businessman and government official (1928–2025)

United States Under Secretary of Health and Human Services
- In office 1983–1984
- President: Ronald Reagan
- Preceded by: John Svahn
- Succeeded by: Don Newman

Personal details
- Born: Charles Duane Baker III; June 21, 1928 Newburyport, Massachusetts, U.S.
- Died: November 1, 2025 (aged 97) Needham, Massachusetts, U.S.
- Party: Republican
- Spouse: Alice Ghormley (m. 1955; died 2016)
- Relations: Charles D. Baker (grandfather)
- Children: 3, including Charlie
- Education: Harvard University (BA, MBA)
- Profession: Businessman; politician

Military service
- Allegiance: United States
- Branch: United States Navy
- Service years: 1946–1953
- Rank: Lieutenant junior grade

Charles Duane Baker III (June 21, 1928 – November 1, 2025) was an American businessman and Republican Party politician who served as United States Deputy Secretary of Health and Human Services from 1983 to 1984 under President Ronald Reagan. He previously served in several departmental roles during the presidency of Richard Nixon. He was the father of former Governor of Massachusetts Charlie Baker.

== Early life and education ==
Charles Duane Baker III was born in Newburyport, Massachusetts. He was the son of Charles D. Baker Jr. (d. 1971), a prominent Republican politician from Newburyport, Massachusetts, and Eleanor (Little) Baker. His grandfather was also named Charles D. Baker (1846–1934), and was a United States Attorney and member of the New York State Assembly. The young Baker had two sisters, Caroline R. Baker and Nancy B. Kobick.

He attended Baldwin High School in Baldwin, New York, and graduated in 1945. He went on to attend Harvard College, and graduated in 1951 with an A.B.

Baker spent 1946 to 1948 in the United States Navy in aviation, and returned from 1951 to 1953. In the Navy, he achieved the rank of lieutenant (junior grade). He then returned to Harvard, receiving an M.B.A. from Harvard Business School in 1955.

== Career ==
Baker moved to Elmira, New York, after graduation, where he became a buyer for the Westinghouse Electric Corporation. Baker served as vice president of United Research, an economic research firm, from 1961 to 1965.

In 1965, Baker became vice president of Harbridge House, a management consulting firm, part of whose client base included the United States Department of Defense, Department of Health and Human Services, and Department of Transportation.

Throughout his career, Baker served the following roles: United States Deputy Under Secretary of Transportation (1969), Assistant Secretary of Transportation for Policy and International Affairs (1970–1971), and Under Secretary of Health and Human Services (1984–1985).

In 1985, he became a professor at the Northeastern University College of Business Administration.

== Personal life ==
Baker married Alice Elizabeth "Betty" Ghormley (December 24, 1932 – May 21, 2016) of Rochester, Minnesota, on June 4, 1955. They had three sons, including Charles Duane Jr.

Baker died in Needham, Massachusetts, on November 1, 2025, at the age of 97.
