= Winifred G. Helmes =

American educator, historian, public servant, and author

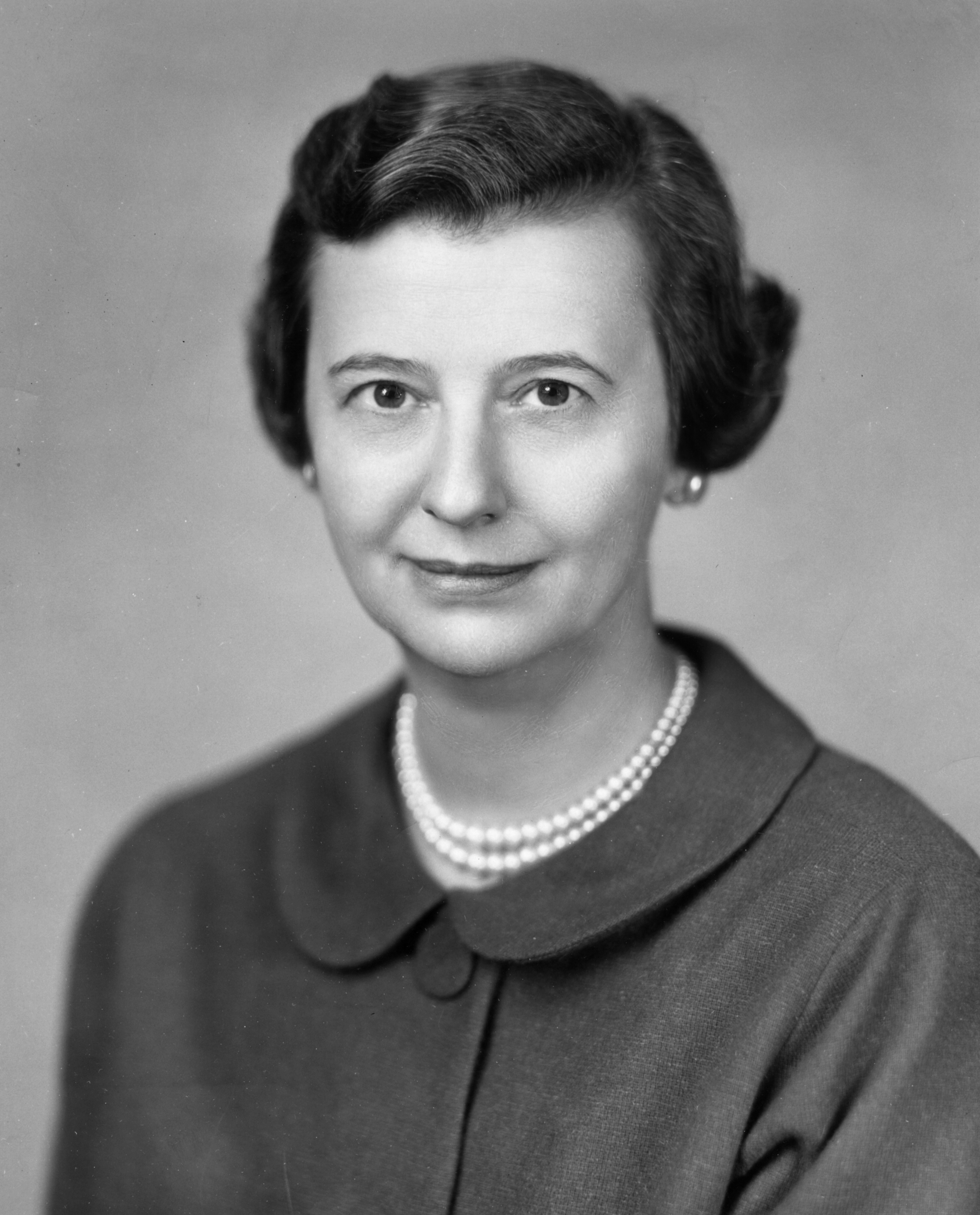
Dr. Winifred G. Helmes, U.S. Department of Health, Education, and Welfare, 1959

Winifred Gertrude Helmes (March 6, 1913 – July 24, 2005) was an American educator, historian, public servant, and author.

Born in St. Paul, Minnesota, Helmes graduated from the University of Minnesota where she earned her Bachelor of Science, Master's, and Ph.D. degrees. Her doctoral dissertation, published by the University Minnesota Press in 1949, was a political biography of former Minnesota governor John Albert Johnson. Helmes taught history at the University of Minnesota and at Louisiana State University as a teaching assistant. She became a member of the faculty at Bradford Junior College in Massachusetts in 1943 where she taught history and directed a bi-weekly radio program for the college. It was at Bradford that Helmes met her lifelong friend, Bertha Adkins.

In 1951, Helmes joined the executive staff of the American Association of University Women and directed its Status of Women program. Even after leaving the executive staff in 1954, she remained active with the AAUW as a member of the Maryland State Division Board, president of the Salisbury branch, and membership on the Educational Foundation, Communications Advisory, and Bertha Adkins Fellowship Committees.

In 1954 she became assistant director of the United States Women's Bureau. For three years she was a member of the Secretary of Labor's special staff to develop the department's Manpower Program, writing articles about "womanpower" and touring the country to speak to various women's organizations. In October 1959, she was appointed special assistant to the Under Secretary of Health, Education and Welfare, Bertha Adkins. In this position, she worked primarily in the area of public affairs, particularly in connection with the Under-Secretary's official relations with educational institutions, national organizations, and other groups. She also served as liaison with various agencies of the Department of Health, Education and Welfare.

From 1961 to 1967, Helmes served as academic dean at the Foxcroft School in Middleburg, Virginia under the school's new head, Bertha Adkins, and at the Samuel Ready School in Baltimore, Maryland from 1967 to 1968. In 1968 she joined the faculty of Salisbury State College (now Salisbury University) as associate professor of history. She introduced the school's first courses on the history of women and, beginning in 1973, initiated and organized three annual Eastern Shore Conferences on Women. Helmes received a grant from the Maryland Bicentennial Commission to edit Notable Maryland Women, in addition to directing a two-year project involving Maryland AAUW branches that led to Who's Who of Maryland Women, 1930-1976, Baltimore County Women, 1930-1975, and Who's Who of Wicomico Women, 1930-1976. Helmes retired from teaching in 1981.

Helmes received an honorary LL.D. degree from Hobart and William Smith College in 1958. She was a national consultant for the Women's Archives at Radcliffe College (now the Arthur and Elizabeth Schlesinger Library on the History of Women in America). She also served on both the Virginia and Maryland Commissions on the Status of Women, as well as the Maryland Humanities Council.

She was the author of the book Orchids in the Icebox: The Story of Bertha Adkins and Other Influential Women in the Eisenhower Administration, which was published by Chapel Hill Press in 2002.
