= Linda Seemeyer =

American health care administrator and politician

Secretary of the Wisconsin Department of Health Services
- In office August 2016 – January 2019
- Governor: Scott Walker
- Preceded by: Kitty Rhoades
- Succeeded by: Andrea Palm

Personal details
- Born: Linda Jane Seemeyer; 1949 (age 76–77)

Linda Jane Seemeyer (born 1949) is an American health care administrator and politician. She served as the Wisconsin Secretary of Health Services under Governor Scott Walker starting in August 2016.

Previously, Seemeyer had served as Deputy Secretary of the Wisconsin Department of Administration under Governor of Wisconsin Tommy Thompson and later as the Director of the Milwaukee County Department of Administrative Services under then-County Executive Scott Walker. She served as Director of the Walworth County Department of Health & Human Services from 2007 to 2015.
