= Mary Wakefield =

American nurse and healthcare administrator (born 1954)

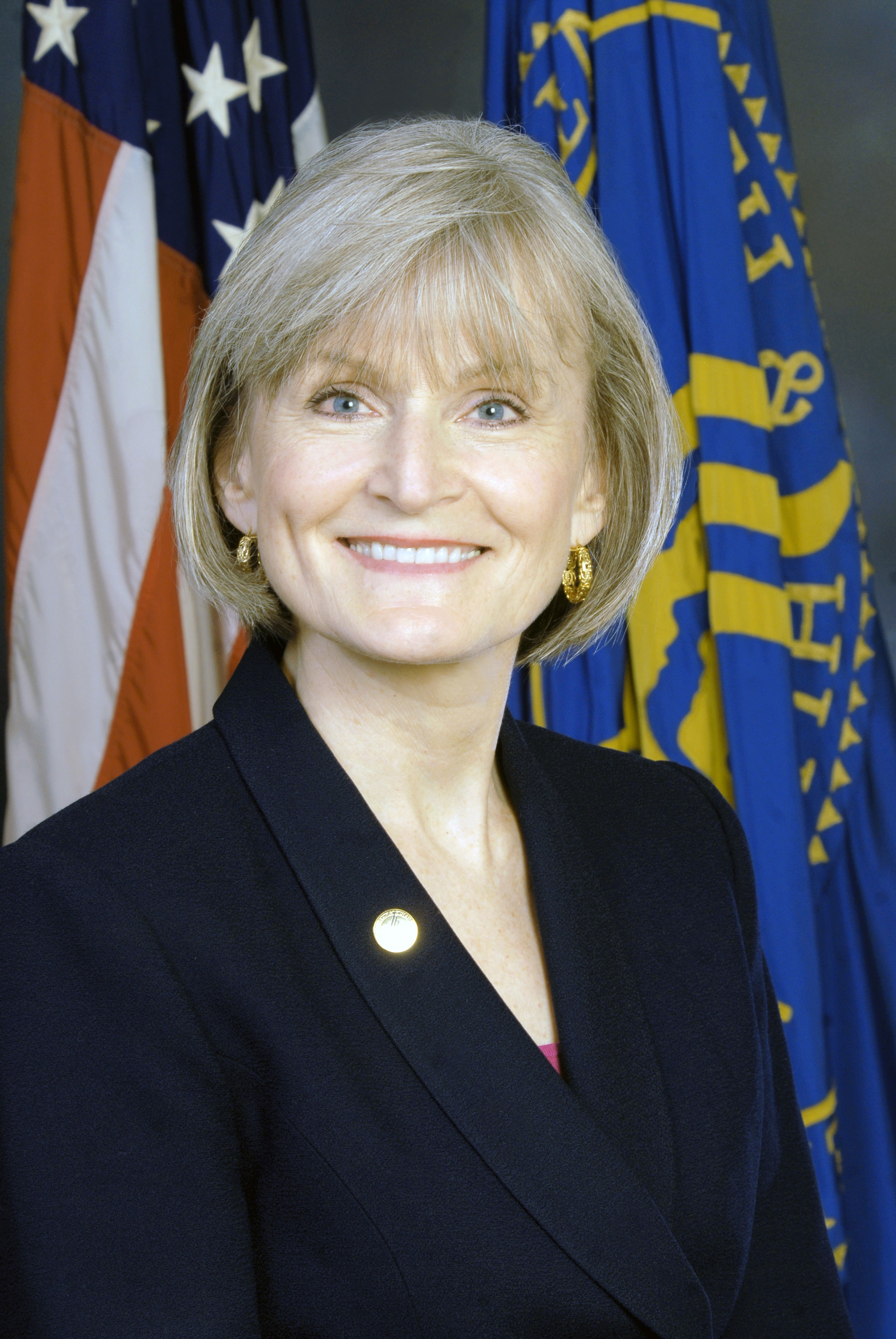

United States Deputy Secretary of Health and Human Services
- Acting
- In office April 2015 – January 20, 2017
- President: Barack Obama
- Preceded by: Bill Corr
- Succeeded by: Colleen Barros (acting)

Personal details
- Born: August 12, 1954 (age 71) Devils Lake, North Dakota, U.S.
- Education: University of Mary (BSN); University of Texas at Austin (MSN, PhD)

Mary Wakefield (born August 12, 1954) is an American nurse and health care administrator, who served in the Obama administration as acting United States Deputy Secretary of Health and Human Services from 2015 to 2017, and as head of the Health Resources and Services Administration from 2009 to 2015.

== Education ==
Wakefield was born in Devils Lake, North Dakota, in 1954. She completed a Bachelor of Science in Nursing from the University of Mary in Bismarck, North Dakota, in 1976, and completed a Master of Science degree in 1978 and a PhD in 1985, in nursing at the University of Texas at Austin.

== Career ==
Wakefield worked as a full or part-time nurse, primarily in medical surgical units and intensive care, from 1976 to 1985, and taught nursing from 1977 to 1987 at the University of North Dakota (UND).

A request for a summer internship in 1987 led to a position as a legislative assistant for health matters for Senator Quentin Burdick (D-ND), who later made her chief of staff. After Burdick's death in 1992, she worked for a month as a consultant for the Global Programme on AIDS at the World Health Organization in Geneva, Switzerland, then took the position of chief of staff for Senator Kent Conrad, which she held until 1996. Her Senate duties included co-chairing the Senate Rural Health Caucus Staff Organization with Sheila Burke, who was also a nurse and was chief of staff for Senator Bob Dole, from 1987 to 1992.

In 1996 she returned to academia and served as professor and director of the Center for Health Policy, Research, and Ethics at George Mason University. In 2001 she returned to North Dakota as the associate dean for rural health at the University of North Dakota School of Medicine and Health Sciences, and director of the Center for Rural Health at UND's School of Medicine and Health Sciences. At UND, Wakefield also was director of the Rural Assistance Center (now the Rural Health Information Hub), a HRSA-funded source of information on rural health and social services for researchers, policymakers, program managers, project officers and the general public. She was a superdelegate at the 2008 Democratic National Convention.

In November 2020, Wakefield was named a volunteer member of the Joe Biden presidential transition Agency Review Team to support transition efforts related to the Department of Health and Human Services and the U.S. Consumer Product Safety Commission.

== Obama Administration ==
Wakefield was named administrator of the Health Resources and Services Administration (HRSA) by President Barack Obama in February 2009. The agency has a budget of $7.5 billion agency that distributes funding across some 3,000 grants spanning 80 programs, and received an additional $2.5B under the Affordable Care Act.

As the administrator of HRSA, she oversaw the approximately 1,100 federally supported community care clinics that serve people without health insurance or who are under-insured; she oversaw the disbursement of $150 million in funding to those clinics under the Affordable Care Act to help people enroll in the program, and another $250 million in competitive grant funding to build new community care clinics and increase services. She also administered the disbursement of $55.5 million in grants to increase the nurse and dentistry workforces.

== Deputy Secretary ==
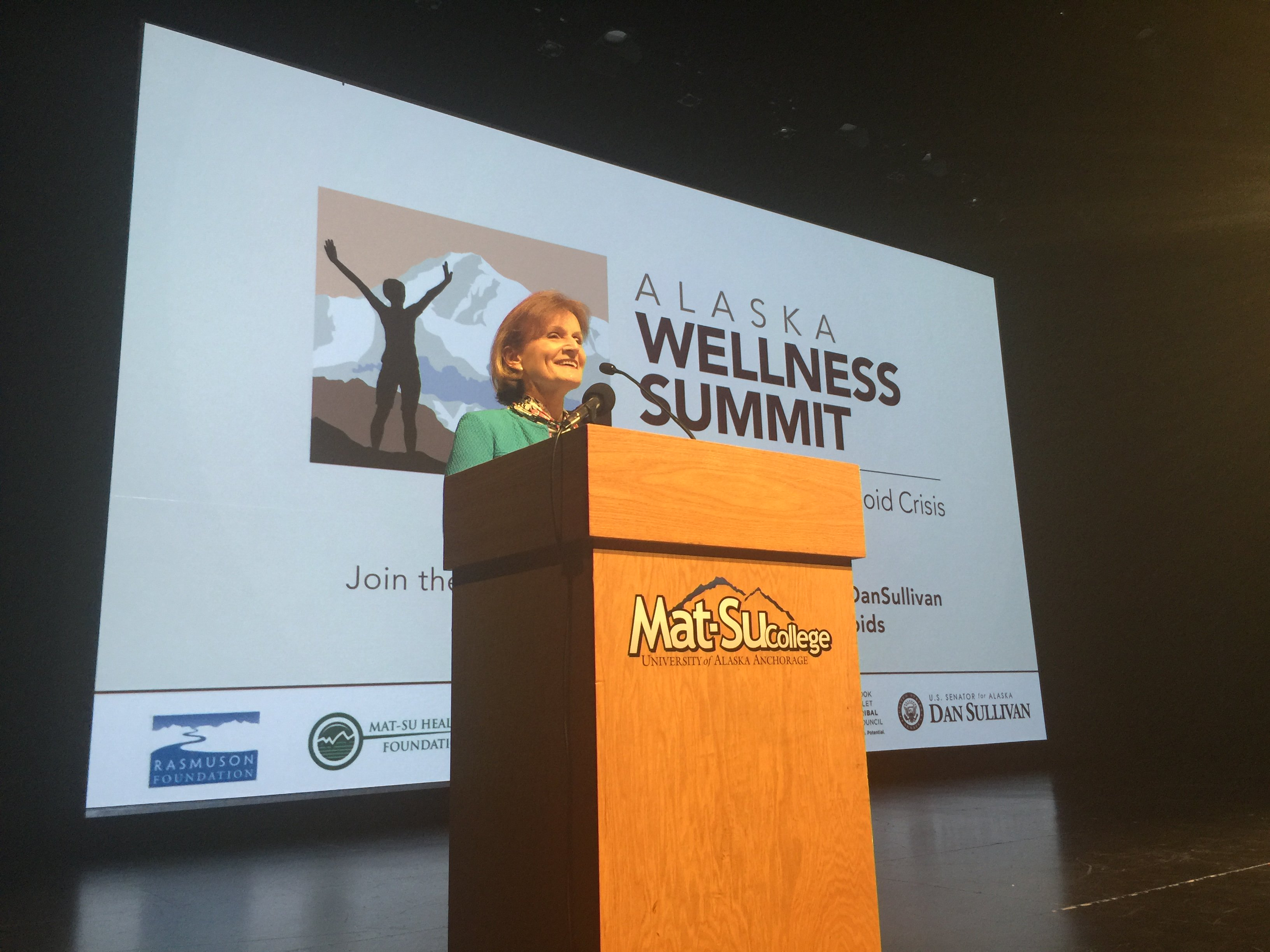
Wakefield speaking at the 2016 Alaska Wellness Summit

Wakefield began serving as acting Deputy Secretary of Health and Human Services in April 2015, after the resignation of Bill Corr, and on July 9, 2015, President Barack Obama nominated Wakefield to that job permanently. On July 13, 2015, her nomination was sent to the United States Senate, and she received a hearing before the United States Senate Committee on Finance on February 4, 2016. Ultimately, however, her nomination was stalled in the Senate and she was never confirmed, due to disputes over abortion between Republican Senators and the Department of Health and Human Services, which had nothing to do with Wakefield personally. Her term as acting deputy secretary ended on January 20, 2017, and she returned to North Dakota.

== Committees ==
Wakefield served on the Institute of Medicine (IoM) committee that produced the report, To Err is Human in 1999, and Crossing the Quality Chasm in 2001. She also co-chaired the IOM committee that produced the 2003 report Health Professions Education: A Bridge to Quality, and chaired the committee that produced the 2005 report Quality Through Collaboration: The Future of Rural Health Care (2005).

In addition, she was a member of President Clinton's Advisory Commission on Consumer Protection and Quality in the Health Care Industry from 1997 to 1998, served on the Medicare Payment Advisory Commission from 1999 to 2004, and was appointed a member of the National Advisory Committee to HRSA's Office of Rural Health Policy in 1999. She served a three-year term as a member of the National Advisory Council for the Agency for Healthcare Research and Quality from 2001 to 2004.

== Honors ==
Wakefield is a fellow in the American Academy of Nursing and was elected to the Institute of Medicine of the National Academies in 2004. In 2019, she was named a Living Legend of the American Academy of Nursing.
