= Don J. Wright =

American physician, government official & diplomat

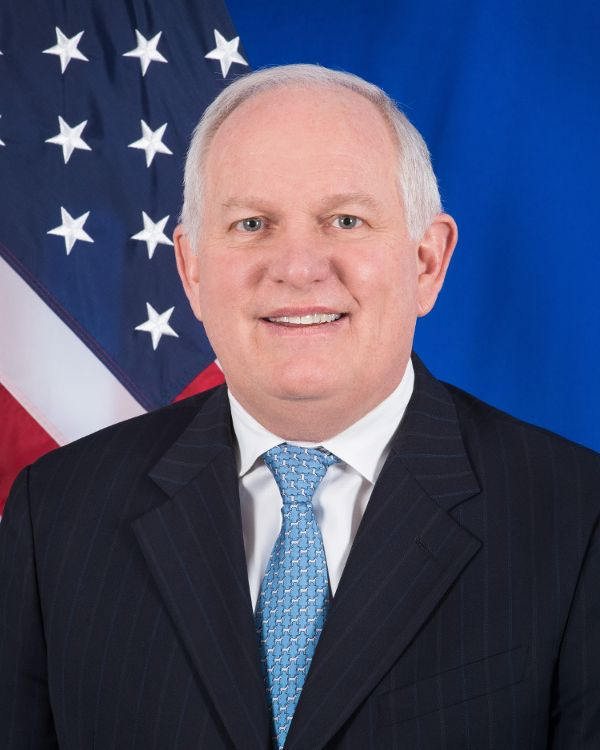

United States Ambassador to Tanzania
- In office August 2, 2020 – January 11, 2023
- President: Donald Trump; Joe Biden
- Preceded by: Mark B. Childress (2016)
- Succeeded by: Michael Battle

United States Secretary of Health and Human Services Acting
- In office September 29, 2017 – October 10, 2017
- President: Donald Trump
- Deputy: Eric Hargan
- Preceded by: Tom Price
- Succeeded by: Eric Hargan (Acting)

United States Assistant Secretary for Health Acting
- In office February 10, 2017 – February 15, 2018
- President: Donald Trump
- Preceded by: Karen DeSalvo (acting)
- Succeeded by: Brett Giroir
- In office September 4, 2007 – March 28, 2008
- President: George W. Bush
- Preceded by: John O. Agwunobi
- Succeeded by: Joxel García

Personal details
- Born: Donald John Wright
- Education: Texas Tech University; University of Texas Medical Branch; Medical College of Wisconsin
- Occupation: Physician; government official; diplomat

Donald John Wright is an American physician, government official, and diplomat who served as United States Ambassador to Tanzania between 2020 and 2023.

Wright served as Acting United States Secretary of Health and Human Services for twelve days in 2017. He was designated by President Donald Trump after his predecessor, Tom Price, resigned on September 29, 2017, amid a charter-flight scandal. Wright was replaced as acting secretary by newly confirmed Deputy Secretary Eric Hargan on October 10, 2017.

== Education ==
Wright received his undergraduate degree from Texas Tech University and his medical degree from the University of Texas Medical Branch at Galveston. He completed his family medicine residency training at Baylor College of Medicine. In addition to his medical degree, he holds a Master of Public Health degree from the Medical College of Wisconsin.

== Career ==
After completing his residency, Wright worked for 15 years in the private sector, maintaining an extensive clinical and consulting practice in Central Texas.

From 2003 to 2007, Wright was Director of the Office of Occupational Medicine for the Occupational Safety and Health Administration (OSHA).

Wright started at HHS in 2007, as Principal Deputy Assistant Secretary for Health. In 2009, he became Deputy Assistant Secretary for Health Care Quality, and in 2012, he was named Deputy Assistant Secretary for Health and Director of the Office of Disease Prevention and Health Promotion. He continued in those positions after being replaced as acting Secretary of HHS.

In October 2019, Wright was nominated to be the next United States Ambassador to Tanzania. He appeared before the Senate Committee on Foreign Relations in December, received committee approval in January 2020, and was confirmed by voice vote of the full Senate on February 11, 2020. Wright was sworn in on April 2, 2020, but did not present his credentials to President John Pombe Magufuli in Dar es Salaam until August 2, 2020.

== See also ==
- List of current ambassadors of the United States

Political offices
| Preceded by Tom Price | United States Secretary of Health and Human Services; Acting; 2017 | Succeeded by Eric Hargan |
Diplomatic posts
| Preceded by Mark B. Childress | United States Ambassador to Tanzania; 2020–2023 | Succeeded by Michael Battle |
