= Hale Champion =

American government and academic administrator

C. Hale Champion (August 27, 1922 – April 23, 2008) was an American government and academic administrator who served as California's Finance Director, director of the Boston Redevelopment Authority, United States Under Secretary of Health, Education, and Welfare, and chief of staff to the Governor of Massachusetts. He also held a variety of positions at Harvard University, including vice president of finance and executive dean of the John F. Kennedy School of Government.

== Early life ==
Champion was born on August 27, 1922, in Coldwater, Michigan. He survived polio as a boy and attended the University of Michigan, but his studies were interrupted by World War II. He served in the United States Army from 1942 to 1945. He was stationed in France and rose to the rank of sergeant. He refused an officer's commission to obtain an earlier discharge. After leaving the Army, Champion worked as a reporter for United Press International, the Milwaukee Journal, and The Sacramento Bee. In 1949 moved to Washington, D.C. to work as an aide to Representative Andrew Biemiller. In 1952 he earned a bachelor's degree in English from Stanford University. After college, Champion worked as a reporter for the San Francisco Chronicle.

== Career ==
In 1958, Champion was appointed press secretary to California governor-elect Pat Brown. In 1961 he was appointed state finance director. He played a major role in shaping policy, including the California Master Plan for Higher Education and improvement of the state's infrastructure.

After Brown left office, Champion became a Kennedy Fellow at the Harvard Institute of Politics. In 1967 he was named director of the Boston Redevelopment Authority by mayor-elect Kevin White. During his tenure as head of the BRA, Champion oversaw the redevelopment of Quincy Market and $1 billion in commitments to commercial development. He resigned in 1969 to become the vice president of planning and operations for the University of Minnesota system. He returned to Massachusetts two years later when he was named Harvard's vice president of finance.

In 1977, Champion was appointed United States Under Secretary of Health, Education, and Welfare. In 1978, HEW secretary Joseph A. Califano Jr. pushed for Champion to become commissioner of the Social Security Administration, however President Jimmy Carter preferred to keep Champion in the higher-ranking role of undersecretary. Champion resigned in 1979, citing his position's low pay and his desire to leave before a law that restricted the ability of former federal officials to deal with the government went into effect.

Champion returned to Harvard as an assistant to president Derek Bok. In 1980 he was appointed executive dean of the John F. Kennedy School of Government. He took a leave of absence from the school in 1987 to serve as chief of staff to Massachusetts Governor Michael Dukakis. He returned to Harvard in the spring of 1989 and taught there until his retirement in 1995. From 1990 to 1992, Champion was chairman of the Kaiser Family Foundation.

== Personal life ==
Champion met his wife Marie Ozine Tifft while he was attending Stanford. They had one son and one daughter. Marie Champion served on the Sacramento, California school committee while the family resided there. On July 7, 1965, Champion, his wife, and their infant daughter were kidnapped by two ex-convicts. who were unaware of Champion's government position. They were released two days later after Champion was wounded in an exchange of gunfire in Tonopah, Nevada.

Champion spent his final years caring for his wife, who had Alzheimer's disease. Champion died on April 23, 2008, at Mount Auburn Hospital in Cambridge, Massachusetts from prostate cancer.

Political offices
Preceded by John Carr	California Finance Director; 1961–1967	Succeeded by Gordon Smith
Preceded by Francis X. Cuddy	Director of the Boston Redevelopment Authority; 1968–1969	Succeeded by John D. Warner
Preceded by Marjorie Lynch	United States Under Secretary of Health, Education, and Welfare; 1977–1979	Succeeded by Nathan J. Stark
Preceded by John Sasso	Chief of Staff to the Governor of Massachusetts; 1987–1988	Succeeded by S. Stephen Rosenfield
