= Charles Horner (diplomat) =

U.S. diplomat (born 1943)

Charles Horner (born April 8, 1943) is a former Deputy Assistant Secretary of State and Associate Director of the U.S. Information Agency during the administrations of President Ronald Reagan, and is currently a Senior Fellow at the Hudson Institute in Washington, D.C.

He is married to former government official and businesswoman, Constance Horner.

== Career in government and diplomacy ==
Horner's service in government began as Staff Assistant to the late Senator Henry M. Jackson (D.-Wash.) and as Senior Legislative Assistant for Foreign Affairs and National Security Policy to the late Senator Daniel P. Moynihan. (D.-NY).

President George H. W. Bush appointed him to the J. William Fulbright Foreign Scholarship Board and President George W. Bush appointed him to the Board of Directors of the U.S. Institute of Peace. Horner has also been a member of the Secretary of State’s Advisory Committee on International Communications and Information Policy, the Secretary of Commerce’s Advisory Committee on the National Oceanic and Atmospheric Administration, the Voice of America Advisory Committee, and the Advisory Board of the U.S. Merchant Marine Academy.

Horner received the Department of State’s Superior Honor Award.

== China scholar and commentator ==
Horner began his study of China at the University of Pennsylvania and later was a graduate student at the University of Chicago, National Taiwan University, and Tokyo University. He was adjunct professor in Georgetown University's School of Foreign Service, and also an associate of its Landegger Program in International Business.

Horner is an author of Rising China and Its Postmodern Fate, Volume I: Memories of Empire in a New Global Context (2009). "Explicitly miming Joseph Levenson's trilogy on the roots and meaning of the 1949 revolution," writes the Journal of Asian Studies review, "this book explores the origins and nature of the 1978 reforms and their potential consequences for the world," and brings historical precedents and comparisons to bear." Andrew Erikson, writing in the U.S. Naval War College Review, commended Volume II: Grandeur and Peril in the Next World Order (2015) to "general readers in search of intellectually stimulating but accessible material, to teachers of survey courses at the advanced undergraduate or graduate level, and to specialists seeking insights into their own studies of Chinese history."

A China Scholar's Long March: Collected Writings, 1978-2015 (2019) is a selection of his essays, reviews, and commentary.

== Selected publications ==
=== Books ===
- Horner, Charles. Rising China and Its Postmodern Fate: Memories of Empire in a New Global Context. Athens, Georgia: University of Georgia Press, 2009. ISBN 9780820333342.
- ___, Rising China and Its Postmodern Fate. Vol. 2. Grandeur and Peril in the Next World Order. Leiden: Koninklijke Brill NV, 2015. ISBN 9789004306271
- —— (2018), A China Scholar's Long March, 1978-2015: Reflections on a Changing China, Portlant, ME: MERWIN ASIA 2018, ISBN 9781937385859

=== Selected articles ===
- Horner, Charles; Brown, Eric (2011). "A Century after the Qing: Yesterday's Empire and Today's Republics". China Heritage Quarterly. 27.
- ---, "China's Democratic Future", Clarement Review of Books, 2019
