= Don M. Newman =

American pharmacist (1923–2021)

United States Under Secretary of Health and Human Services
- In office 1985–1989
- Preceded by: Charles D. Baker
- Succeeded by: Constance Horner

Personal details
- Born: July 31, 1923 Chicago, Illinois, U.S.
- Died: January 24, 2021 (aged 97) Belleair, Florida, U.S.
- Education: Purdue University; Indiana University South Bend; Georgetown University
- Profession: Pharmacist

Don Melvin Newman (July 31, 1923 – January 24, 2021) was an American pharmacist who served as the United States Under Secretary of Health and Human Services under President Ronald Reagan from 1985 to 1989. In 1990, he was appointed a United States Representative on the Council of the International Civil Aviation Organization, and served until 1994. He attended Purdue University (B.S., 1947), Georgetown University Law Center (J.D., 1979), and Indiana University South Bend (M.S.B.A., 1972; M.B.A., 1989). He died in January 2021, at the age of 97.

In April 1943, he joined the United States Army Air Forces and served as an B-17 Bomber pilot instructor in Columbus, Ohio. After initially serving as an aviation cadet, he was commissioned as a second lieutenant. He was discharged in 1945.

He was twice the Republican nominee in Indiana's 3rd Congressional District, in 1970 and 1972; he was defeated both times by Democratic incumbent John Brademas.
