= Constance Horner =

American businesswoman

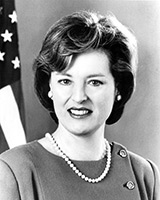
- Horner in 1985

Director of the White House Presidential Personnel Office
- In office 1991–1993
- President: George H. W. Bush
- Preceded by: Chase Untermeyer
- Succeeded by: Bruce Lindsey

United States Deputy Secretary of Health and Human Services
- In office 1989–1991
- President: George H. W. Bush
- Preceded by: Don M. Newman
- Succeeded by: Kevin Moley

Director of the United States Office of Personnel Management
- In office August 22, 1985 – May 10, 1989
- President: Ronald Reagan; George H. W. Bush
- Preceded by: Loretta Cornelius (acting)
- Succeeded by: Constance Newman

Personal details
- Born: Constance Joan McNeely; February 24, 1942 (age 84) Summit, New Jersey, U.S.
- Party: Democratic (before 1970s); Republican (1970s–present)
- Spouse: Charles Horner
- Education: University of Pennsylvania (BA); University of Chicago (MA)

Constance Joan Horner (born February 24, 1942, nee McNeely) is an American businesswoman, known for being the third Director of the United States Office of Personnel Management as well as President Reagan's chief advisor on Federal civil service personnel matters. She was a presidential appointee in the Administrations of President Reagan and President George H. W. Bush.

Horner worked for OPM from August 22, 1985 through May 10, 1989. During her time in the Reagan administration she also served as Associate Director for Economics and Government in the Office of Management and Budget. She approved the budget and legislative proposals of many of Federal agencies, including the Departments of Treasury, Justice, Transportation, Commerce, Housing and Urban Development. She was the Director of VISTA as well as Acting Associate Director of ACTION, VISTA's parent agency.

She later served in the Bush administration where he appointed her deputy secretary of health and human services and later director of Presidential Personnel where she advised the President on "the selection of appointees to cabinet and sub-cabinet posts, ambassadorships, judgeships, regulatory agencies, and commissions." During her nomination hearing for the position at Health and Human Services, Senator David Durenberger said of Horner "[I]f you had to find somebody inside the system who was never satisfied that the system worked well enough for the people it is supposed to serve, it would be Constance Horner."

After she left the White House Horner was a guest scholar at the Brookings Institution, writing and lecturing on public organization management reforms. She is a lecturer and writer on the subject of managing the Federal Government. Her writing on public policy has been published in The Wall Street Journal, The New York Times, and The American Spectator. As of 2013 she served on the boards of directors of The Prudential Insurance Company of America, Ingersoll-Rand, and Pfizer.

== Early years and education ==
Horner was born in Summit, New Jersey. Raised in Chatham Borough, New Jersey, she graduated from Chatham High School in 1960.

She graduated from the University of Pennsylvania in 1964 and received an M.A. degree in English Literature from the University of Chicago in 1967. She is married to Charles Horner. They have two sons. They live in Lexington, Virginia.
