= John Alanson Perkins =

American academic, academic administrator, and politician

22nd President of University of Delaware
- In office 1950–1967
- Preceded by: William S. Carlson
- Succeeded by: John Alanson Perkins

3rd Under Secretary of Health, Education and Welfare
- In office April 1957 – March 1958
- President: Dwight D. Eisenhower
- Preceded by: Herold Hunt
- Succeeded by: Bertha Adkins

Personal details
- Born: June 29, 1914 Owosso, Michigan
- Died: April 6, 1982 (67) Berkeley, California

John Alanson Perkins (June 29, 1914– April 6, 1982) was an American academic, academic administrator and politician.

== Life and career ==
The son of Glen E. Perkins and his wife Clara M. Reed, John Alanson Perkins was born in Owosso, Michigan on June 29, 1914. He graduated from the University of Michigan (UM) with a bachelor, master, and doctoral degrees. In his early career he worked as secretary to United States senator Arthur Vandenberg. He also taught on the faculty of UM.

Perkins served as president of the University of Delaware from 1950 to 1967 (on leave from 1957 to 1958) and served as the United States Under Secretary of Health, Education, and Welfare from April 1957 to March 1958. In 1967 he was appointed president of Dun & Bradstreet, and a year later became chairman of that company's board.

In 1968 Perkins was elected a trustee of the Alfred P. Sloan Foundation and also served on that foundation's executive committee. In 1970-1971 Perkins worked on the staff of Northwestern University, and from 1972-1977 he was a professor of political science at University of California, Berkeley. He penned three books; among them Plain Talk From a Campus (1959). He was also active in a researcher on labor issues.

Perkins died on April 6, 1982 in Berkeley, California at the age of 67.
