= Lincoln Shropshire =

American politician

Member of the Washington House of Representatives for the 14th district
- In office 1953–1967
- Succeeded by: Marjorie Lynch

Personal details
- Born: February 17, 1900 South Bend, Washington, United States
- Died: March 6, 1983 (aged 83) Yakima, Washington, United States
- Party: Republican

Lincoln Earl Shropshire (February 17, 1900 – March 6, 1983) was an American politician in the state of Washington. He served in the Washington House of Representatives from 1953 to 1967 for district 14.
