= Jane Morrow Spaulding =

Jane Morrow Spaulding (1900 – 10 September 1965) was a United States social worker. She was the first African American Assistant to the United States Secretary of the Department of Health, Education, and Welfare and the first African American female assistant secretary in a United States President's cabinet.

== Life ==
Jane was born in Logan County, Kentucky. She was raised in Nashville, Tennessee. She graduated from Fisk University. She married Dr. Albert Lee Spaulding, and had a child, Dr. Albert L. Spaulding Jr. In 1965, she died of a stroke.

== Career ==
Spaulding was an active and well-known United States social worker. Spaulding became involved in the Roosevelt administration, as the director of the "Negro Division" of the West Virginia Relief Administration. She held that position for four years. The West Virginia Relief Program worked to rehabilitate rural communities and aid those in rural areas economically and educationally. The West Virginia Relief Program also provided scholarships for five students studying at West Virginia State College to attend the Atlanta School of Social Work, and upon graduation, graduates were expected to "return to West Virginia to organize and maintain social welfare programs in African American communities." In 1934, Spaulding was elected vice president of the Central Association of Colored Women's Clubs in Louisville, Kentucky.

In 1951, she was the United States representative for the U.S. Council of Women at the Triennial International Council of Women. During that year, she also took part in the Human Rights Commission of the United Nations. In 1952, she worked to campaign for Black votes for the Eisenhower election. She caught the attention of the administration, as she worked hard to communicate to African American voters about the Republican civil rights platform. She was seen as very effective in gaining African American support throughout the entire United States.

In 1952, Spaulding became the first African American female assistant secretary in the cabinet of a United States President. She became the assistant of Mrs. Oswald B. Lord, who was then cochair of Citizens for Eisenhower. In 1953, she became Assistant Secretary of the Department of Health Education and Welfare. She was specially appointed by president Dwight D. Eisenhower. At the time of her appointment, she was "the highest paid African American employed by the federal government."

After nine months, she lost her position as Assistant Secretary. Allegedly, this was due to her refusal to support Jim Crow laws. Particularly, Spaulding was asked to sign and distribute a letter that rebuffed the charges that Oveta Hobby was delaying integration of schools on military bases. Spaulding refused, and went on to give anti-discrimination speeches, along with supporting the NAACP's position on an issue of a Houston hospital not recognizing African American doctors. She then moved to the War Claims Commission, a move that was charged by NAACP director Clarence Mitchell as a ploy to eventually fire her completely. However, in 1954, she was appointed to her third position in the Eisenhower administration - a consultant with the Foreign Operations Administration.

== Awards and honors ==
Spaulding was named Woman of the Year by the National Council of Negro Women in 1953. In 1955, she was named one of America's ten best dressed women by Ebony magazine.
