= James H. McCrocklin =

James Henry McCrocklin was an American academic administrator and politician. He served as President of Texas State University from August 1964 to April 1969, and as the United States Under Secretary of Health, Education, and Welfare from July 1968 to January 1969. His career ended due to a plagiarism scandal that resulted in his doctoral degree being revoked.
