= Eric Hargan =

American civil servant (born 1968)

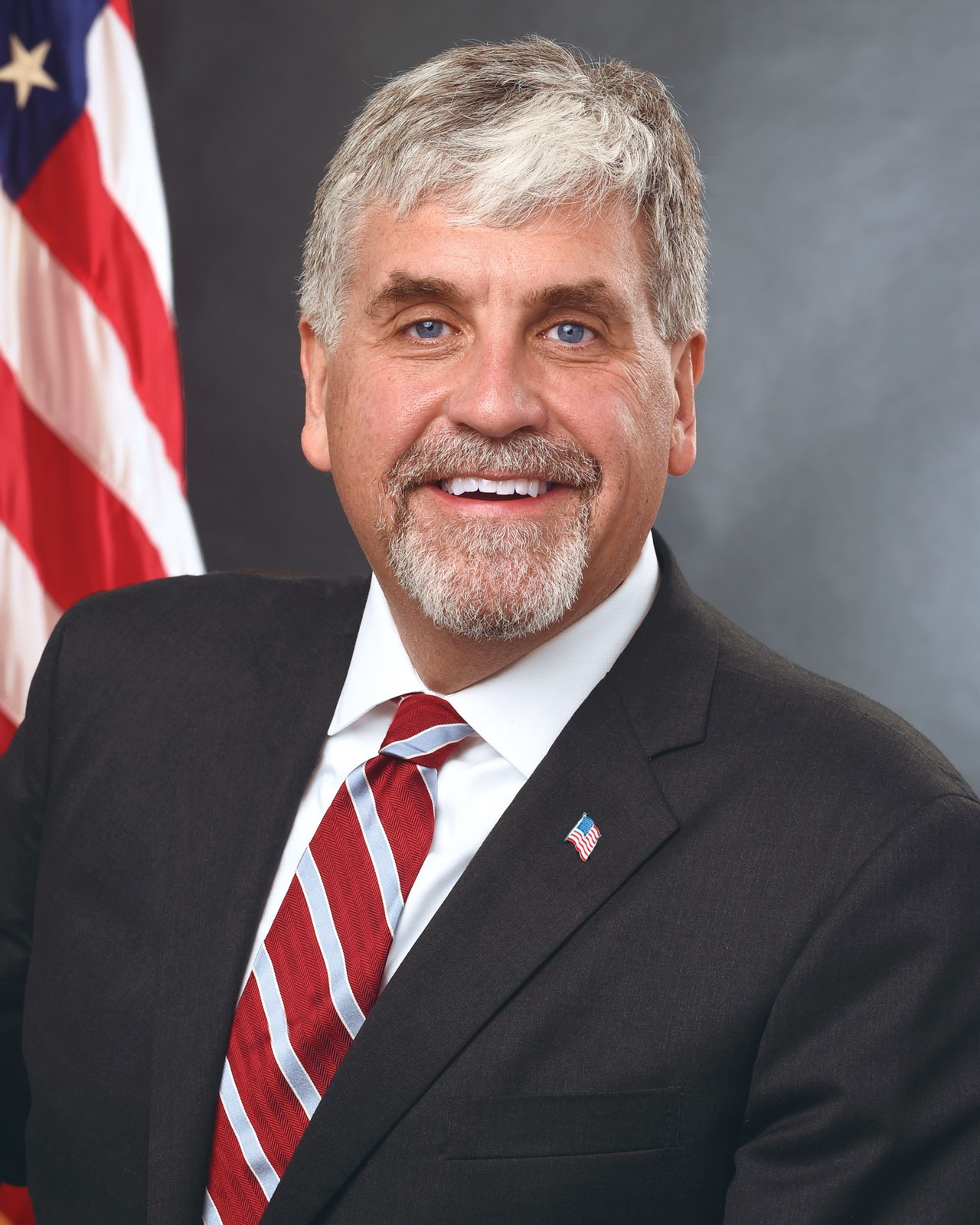
- Official portrait, 2017

23rd United States Deputy Secretary of Health and Human Services
- In office October 6, 2017 – January 20, 2021
- President: Donald Trump
- Preceded by: Bill Corr
- Succeeded by: Andrea Palm
- Acting; February 4, 2007 – August 5, 2007
- President: George W. Bush
- Preceded by: Alex Azar
- Succeeded by: Tevi Troy

United States Secretary of Health and Human Services
- Acting; October 10, 2017 – January 29, 2018
- President: Donald Trump
- Preceded by: Don J. Wright
- Succeeded by: Alex Azar

Personal details
- Born: Eric David Hargan; June 3, 1968 (age 58) Cape Girardeau, Missouri, U.S.
- Party: Republican
- Children: 2
- Education: Harvard University (BA); Columbia University (JD)

Eric David Hargan (born June 3, 1968) is an American lawyer and government official who served as United States Deputy Secretary of Health and Human Services from October 2017 to January 2021. A member of the Republican Party, Hargan previously acted in this role in 2007 under the George W. Bush administration.

On October 10, 2017, President Donald Trump appointed Hargan as acting United States Secretary of Health and Human Services, which he held until January 29, 2018, when Alex Azar assumed the office.

== Early life and education ==
Hargan was born in 1968 in Cape Girardeau, Missouri and raised in Mounds, Illinois. He received his B.A. in philosophy from Harvard University and his J.D. from Columbia Law School, where he was a senior editor of the Columbia Law Review.

== Career ==
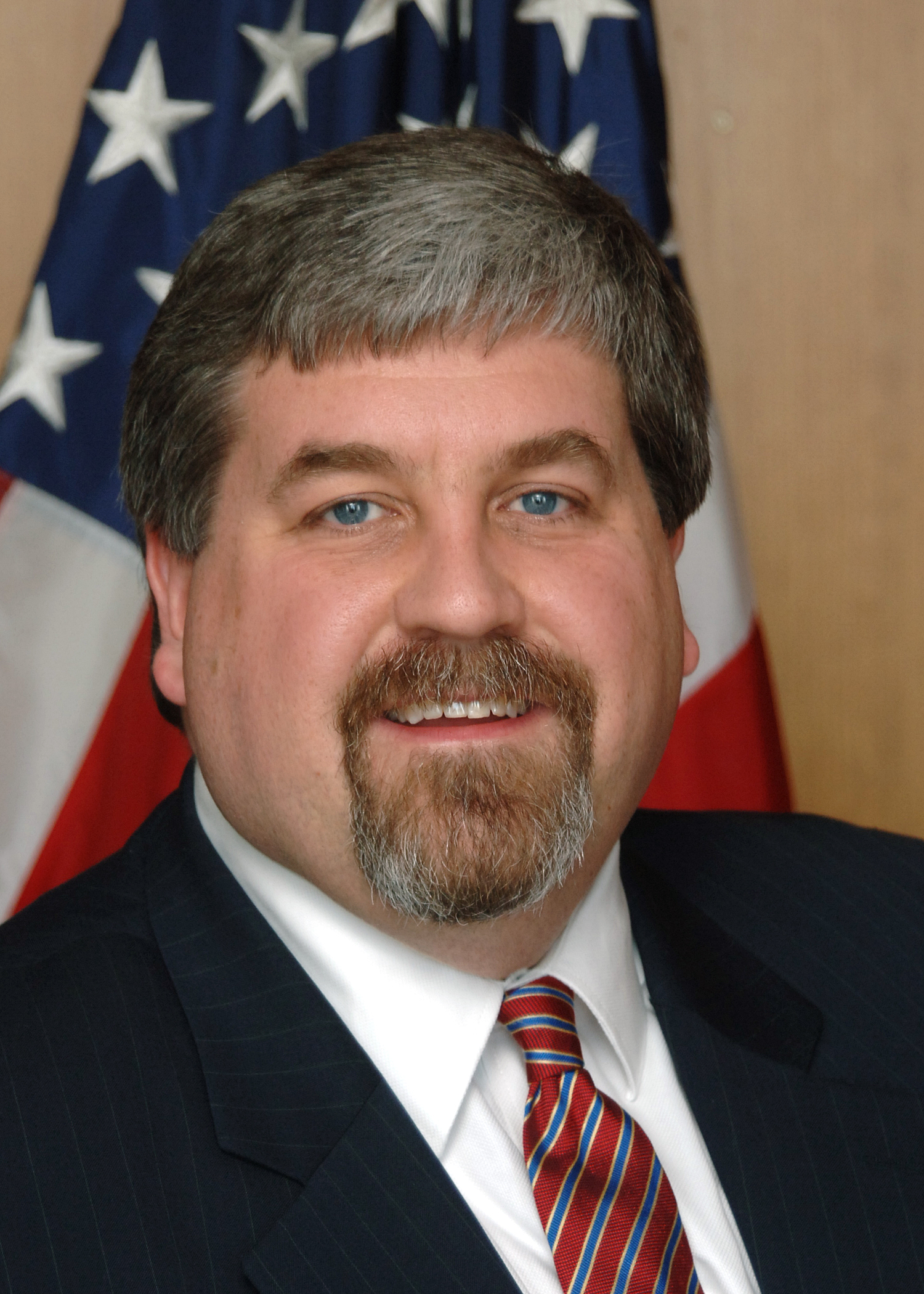
Hargan's HHS portrait during the George W. Bush administration

From 1997 to 2003, Hargan was a partner in the Chicago headquarters of the law firm of Winston & Strawn, where he specialized in corporate law, particularly mergers and acquisitions, securities, and venture capital transactions.

From 2003 to 2005, Hargan served as Deputy General Counsel of HHS for the George W. Bush administration. From 2005 to 2007, he served the Department as Principal Associate Deputy Secretary and Acting Deputy Secretary. Working closely with Secretary Mike Leavitt, Hargan oversaw the department's operations. He also served as the Regulatory Policy Officer for HHS, overseeing the development and approval of all HHS regulations and significant guidances.

Hargan left the government in 2007 and joined the health law department of law firm McDermott Will & Emery. Hargan joined the health and FDA business development practice of law firm Greenberg Traurig in June 2010.

In 2014, Hargan worked on Illinois Governor Bruce Rauner's health care transition team.

Following the election of Donald Trump, Hargan was on the administration's HHS transition team. On March 15, 2017, Hargan was nominated to be the United States Deputy Secretary of Health and Human Services. His confirmation hearing was held on June 7, 2017. Hargan was confirmed by the U.S. Senate on October 4, 2017.

He is the founder of the Hargan Strategies.

== Personal life ==
Hargan lives in Virginia with his wife Emily, and their two sons. Hargan served as a professor at Loyola University Chicago School of Law, teaching healthcare regulations and administrative law.

Political offices
Preceded by Alex Azar	United States Deputy Secretary of Health and Human Services; Acting; 2007	Succeeded by Tevi Troy
Preceded by Bill Corr	United States Deputy Secretary of Health and Human Services; 2017–2021	Succeeded by Andrea Palm
Preceded by Don J. Wright; Acting	United States Secretary of Health and Human Services; Acting; 2017–2018	Succeeded by Alex Azar
