= United States Deputy Secretary of Health and Human Services =

Leading role in US federal department

- Seal of the Department of Health and Human Services
- Incumbent; Vacant since February 13, 2026
- United States Department of Health and Human Services
- Style: Mr. Deputy Secretary (informal); The Honorable (formal)
- Reports to: United States Secretary of Health and Human Services
- Seat: Hubert H. Humphrey Building, Washington, D.C.
- Appointer: The president; with Senate advice and consent
- Term length: No fixed term
- Precursor: Under Secretary of Health and Human Services
- Formation: August 1990
- First holder: Nelson Rockefeller
- Salary: Executive Schedule, level II
- Website: www.hhs.gov

The deputy secretary of health and human services (formerly the under secretary of health, education, and welfare, 1953–1979, and the under secretary of health and human services, 1979–1990) is the chief operating officer of the United States Department of Health and Human Services (HHS). The deputy secretary oversees all operations within the department, including overseeing Medicare, Medicaid, public health, medical research, food and drug safety, welfare, child and family services, disease prevention, Indian health, and mental health services. The deputy secretary was Jim O'Neill, from June 2025 to February 2026.

The deputy secretary is also the regulatory policy officer for the department, overseeing the development and approval of all HHS regulations and significant guidance. In addition, the deputy secretary leads a number of initiatives at the department, including implementing the president's management agenda, combating bio-terrorism, and public health emergency preparedness. He also represents the secretary of health and human services on the board of the John F. Kennedy Center for the Performing Arts.

The deputy secretary is appointed by the president and confirmed by the Senate. The deputy secretary is paid at level II of the Executive Schedule. The deputy secretary is assisted by a principal associate deputy secretary of health and human services, two associate deputy secretaries, and three staff assistants. The position of deputy secretary was originally held by an under secretary until the position was retitled in August 1990. The position of under secretary had been in existence since the creation of the Department of Health, Education, and Welfare in 1953.

== Health, Education, and Welfare ==
=== List of assistant secretaries ===
#	Image	Name	Took office	Left office	President served under	References
1		Jane Morrow Spaulding	April 1953	January 1954	Dwight D. Eisenhower	

=== List of under secretaries ===
#	Image	Name	Took office	Left office	President served under	References
1		Nelson Rockefeller	June 1953	December 1954	Dwight D. Eisenhower	
		Vacant	December 1954	September 1955	Dwight D. Eisenhower	
2		Herold Christian Hunt	September 1955	February 1957	Dwight D. Eisenhower	
		Vacant	February 1957	April 1957	Dwight D. Eisenhower	
3		John Alanson Perkins	April 1957	March 1958	Dwight D. Eisenhower	
		Vacant	March 7, 1958	March 18, 1958	Dwight D. Eisenhower	
4		Bertha Adkins	March 1958	January 1961	Dwight D. Eisenhower	
5		Ivan Arnold Nestingen	January 1961	May 1965	John F. Kennedy	
5		Ivan Arnold Nestingen	January 1961	May 1965	Lyndon B. Johnson	
6		Wilbur J. Cohen	June 1965	May 1968	Lyndon B. Johnson	
		Vacant	May 1968	July 1968	Lyndon B. Johnson	
7		James H. McCrocklin	July 1968	January 1969	Lyndon B. Johnson	
		Vacant	January 1969	March 1969	Richard Nixon	
8		John Veneman	March 1969	January 1973	Richard Nixon	
9		Frank Carlucci	January 1973	January 1975	Richard Nixon	
9		Frank Carlucci	January 1973	January 1975	Gerald Ford	
10		Marjorie Lynch	November 1975	January 1977		
10		Marjorie Lynch	November 1975	January 1977	Gerald Ford	
11		Hale Champion	January 1977	June 1979		
11		Hale Champion	January 1977	June 1979	Jimmy Carter	

== Health and Human Services ==
=== List of under secretaries ===
#	Image	Name	Took office	Left office	President served under	References
12		John A. Svahn	March 1983	September 1983	Ronald Reagan	
13		Charles D. Baker	1984	1985	Ronald Reagan	
14		Don M. Newman	1985	1989	Ronald Reagan	
15		Constance Horner	1989	August 1990	George H. W. Bush	

=== List of deputy secretaries ===
#	Image	Name	Took office	Left office	President served under	References
15		Constance Horner	August 1990	1991	George H. W. Bush	
16		Kevin Moley	1991	1993	George H. W. Bush	
17		Walter Broadnax	1993	1996	Bill Clinton	
18		Kevin Thurm	1996	2001	Bill Clinton	
19		Claude Allen	May 26, 2001	January 22, 2005	George W. Bush	
20		Alex Azar	January 22, 2005	February 4, 2007	George W. Bush	
–		Eric Hargan (acting)	February 4, 2007	August 5, 2007	George W. Bush	
21		Tevi Troy	August 5, 2007	January 20, 2009	George W. Bush	
22		Bill Corr	May 6, 2009	April 2015	Barack Obama	
–		Mary Wakefield (acting)	April 2015	January 20, 2017	Barack Obama	
–		Colleen Barros (acting)	January 20, 2017	October 6, 2017	Donald Trump	
23		Eric Hargan	October 6, 2017	January 20, 2021	Donald Trump	
24		Andrea Palm	May 12, 2021	January 20, 2025	Joe Biden	
25		Jim O'Neill	June 9, 2025	February 13, 2026	Donald Trump	

== Sources ==
- Journal of physical education and recreation, Vol. 28, American Physical Education Association, 1957
- The inauguration of James Henry McCrocklin as fourth president of Southwest Texas State Teachers College, Southwest Texas State Teachers College, 1964
- A common thread of service, United States Department of Health, Education, and Welfare, 1970
- Public Papers of the Presidents of the United States, Richard Nixon, 1973: Containing the Public Messages, Statements, and Speeches of the President, Government Printing Office, 1999, ISBN 978-0-16-058865-5
- Bowling, Lawson (2005), Shapers of the great debate on the Great Society: a biographical dictionary, Greenwood Publishing Group, ISBN 978-0-313-31434-6
- Derthick, Martha (1979), Policymaking for social security, Brookings Institution Press, ISBN 978-0-8157-1815-4
- Kaplowitz, Craig Allan (2005), LULAC, Mexican Americans, and national policy, Texas A&M University Press, ISBN 978-1-58544-388-8
- Mjagkij, Nina (2003), Portraits of African American life since 1865, Rowman & Littlefield, ISBN 978-0-8420-2967-4
- Mossman, Jennifer (2001), Almanac of Famous People: A Comprehensive Reference Guide to More than 33,000 Famous and Infamous Newsmakers from Biblical Times to the Present, Vol. 1, Gale Research Co., ISBN 978-0-7876-4793-3
- O'Dea Schenken, Suzanne (1999), From suffrage to the Senate: an encyclopedia of American women in politics, Vol. 2, ABC-CLIO, ISBN 978-0-87436-960-1
- San Migel, Guadalupe (2004), Contested policy: the Rise and Fall of Federal Bilingual Education in the United States, 1960–2001, University of North Texas Press, ISBN 978-1-57441-171-3
- Smith, Jessie Carney (1996), Notable Black American women, Book II, VNR AG, ISBN 978-0-8103-9177-2
- Smith, W. Thomas (2003), Encyclopedia of the Central Intelligence Agency, Infobase Publishing, ISBN 978-0-8160-4666-9
