= Bertha Adkins =

American politician (1906–1983)

4th Under Secretary of Health, Education and Welfare
- In office March 1958 – January 20, 1961
- President: Dwight D. Eisenhower
- Preceded by: John Alanson Perkins
- Succeeded by: Ivan A. Nestingen

Personal details
- Born: August 24, 1906 Salisbury, Maryland, U.S.
- Died: January 14, 1983 (aged 76) Easton, Maryland, U.S.
- Party: Republican

Bertha Sheppard Adkins (August 24, 1906 – January 14, 1983), was an educator, political activist, public servant, and a community leader.

== About ==
=== Early life ===
Adkins was born in Salisbury, Maryland in 1906.

Adkins graduated (at age 15) from Wicomico High School in Salisbury, Maryland. Her parents decided that she was not yet ready for college, so she attended preparatory school at the Baldwin School in Bryn Mawr, Pennsylvania. After graduation she attended Wellesley College where she graduated with an AB degree in 1924. She later received Master of Arts degree from Columbia University. Adkins also received honorary degrees from Hood, Salisbury State, Western Maryland, Wheaton and Wilson Colleges.

Her first job after college was as a teacher at Miss Harold's School, a private elementary school in Salisbury. She held this position from 1928 to 1932. She felt unchallenged by the position and left. After a brief trip to Europe she began working as a secretary in the family business, E. S. Adkins Lumber Company.

In 1934, Western Maryland College (now McDaniel College) in Westminster, Maryland. Adkins became the Dean of Women until 1942. Afterwards, she became the Dean of Residence at Bradford Junior College in Bradford, Massachusetts.

=== Career ===
After the death of her mother in 1946, Adkins returned to Salisbury to run her father's household. At that time she was active in community affairs and also began her political career by volunteering her services to the local Republican Party. In recognition of her organizational abilities and skill in working with the public, she was appointed as Republican National Committeewoman for Maryland in 1948. Some women who had long been active in the Maryland Federation of Republican Women protested this appointment, resentful that the relative newcomer was appointed over other candidates and fearing that this was a case of the men of the party imposing their will on the women's activities. Adkins’ down-to-earth strength in organizing and motivating workers at the precinct level soon won over all but her most bitter rivals.

Two years later, she was appointed executive director of the Women's Division of the Republican National Committee (RNC). In 1953, she became Assistant to the Chairman of the RNC. During this time, she instituted a series of "Breakfasts with the President" and set an example for a series of annual national conferences of Republican women. In her work for the RNC Adkins traveled extensively across the country speaking to Republican women's groups, at Lincoln Day dinners, and at a wide range of party events. Frequently in her speeches she encouraged women to take an active role in party politics and to consider running for elected office. An active member of the American Association of University Women (AAUW), The Bertha Sheppard Adkins fellowship was established in her honor in 1958, for a female scholar pursuing advanced work in American history, government of politics.

She maintained close relationships with Democratic women leaders throughout her political career, maintaining that strong participation by women in both parties was needed to ensure a strong two-party system. She continued to be active in the Republican Party throughout her life. In 1968, she helped organize the unsuccessful Presidential campaign bid of Nelson Rockefeller.

President Dwight D. Eisenhower appointed Adkins the Under Secretary of Health, Education, and Welfare (HEW) in 1958. She was the first woman to hold this position. One of her chief responsibilities was the oversight of aging programs. In this capacity she directed the organization of the first White House Conference on Aging in 1961. She also played a role in the White House Conference on Children and Youth held in 1960. She hired Winifred G. Helmes as her Special Assistant in 1959.

As Under Secretary she also served on the advisory board for Economic Growth and Stability, the Committee for Rural Development, the committee to Coordinate Federal Urban Area Assistance Programs, and served as chairman of the Department Board on Employee Awards. She continued her extensive speaking schedule with a new agenda; now she promoted HEW programs, in particular, the White House Conference on Aging. As Under Secretary she attended the United Nations Seminar on the Participation of Women in Public Life in Bogota, Colombia, May 18–29, 1959 and the UNESCO General Conference in Paris in November–December, 1960. She also traveled to Finland, Norway, Sweden Soviet Union, and Poland in 1959.

In 1957, President Eisenhower appointed Adkins to the Lincoln Sesquicentennial Commission. She served as chair of the executive committee. The Commission organized publications, promotions and educational programs to commemorate Abraham Lincoln. The activities culminated on Lincoln's 150th birthday in 1959.

After leaving Federal service in 1961, Adkins returned to education. She accepted the position as Head of Foxcroft School in Middleburg, Virginia. She worked to strengthen the academic program at the school. In 1967, she retired to her home in Oxford, Maryland.

Instead of a quiet retirement, Adkins once again entered Federal service, returning to her role as an advocate for the elderly and aging programs. In 1969, President Richard Nixon appointed her to the Task Force on the Problems of the Aging. In 1970 she served on the President's Advisory Committee on Social Security. She served as vice-chairman of the 1971 White House Conference on Aging. In 1972, she served on the Advisory Committee on Older Americans. In 1974, she was appointed to the Advisory Committee on Social Security. Finally, on March 27, 1974, President Nixon appointed her as chairperson of his new Federal Council on Aging. As chairperson, she organized public hearings on national policy concerns for older women. Her work in this area set the tone for the work of the council. She served as chairperson until 1977, and retired completely from the committee in 1978.
