= Norris Cochran =

American civil servant (born 1970)

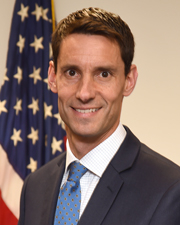

Acting United States Secretary of Health and Human Services
- In office January 20, 2021 – March 19, 2021
- President: Joe Biden
- Preceded by: Alex Azar
- Succeeded by: Xavier Becerra
- In office January 20, 2017 – February 10, 2017
- President: Donald Trump
- Preceded by: Sylvia Mathews Burwell
- Succeeded by: Tom Price

Personal details
- Born: June 9, 1970 (age 56) California, U.S.
- Education: University of California, Santa Barbara (BA); University of Texas at Austin (MPA)

Norris Whitehouse Cochran IV (born June 9, 1970) is an American government official who served as the acting United States Secretary of Health and Human Services from January to March 2021, having also served in this role previously in 2017. He serves as Deputy Assistant Secretary of Budget, and was Acting Assistant Secretary for Financial Resources in the United States Department of Health and Human Services throughout most of the Trump administration.

== Education and career ==
Cochran received a B.A. from the University of California, Santa Barbara in history of public policy in 1993. He earned a Master of Public Affairs at the University of Texas at Austin's Lyndon B. Johnson School of Public Affairs in 1995.

Cochran first worked for the federal government in 1996 when he joined the Centers for Disease Control and Prevention. Between 2001 and 2006 he worked for the Health Division of the Office of Management and Budget.

On February 5, 2006, he joined the Department of Health and Human Services. As of 2007, he was the Director of the Division of Discretionary Programs. He has been Deputy Assistant Secretary of Budget, a Senior Executive Service position, since March 2009. This position involves being the Director of the HHS Office of Budget.

Political offices
Preceded by Sylvia Mathews Burwell	United States Secretary of Health and Human Services; Acting; 2017	Succeeded by Tom Price
Preceded by Alex Azar	United States Secretary of Health and Human Services; Acting; 2021	Succeeded by Xavier Becerra
