= John A. Svahn =

American politician (born 1943)

John Svahn
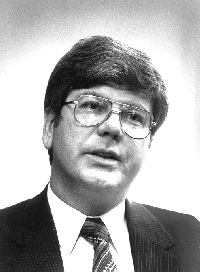
- Official portrait

9th Commissioner of the Social Security Administration
- In office May 6, 1981 – September 12, 1983
- President: Ronald Reagan
- Preceded by: Herbert Doggette (acting)
- Succeeded by: Martha McSteen (acting)

Personal details
- Born: May 13, 1943 (age 82) New London, Connecticut, U.S.
- Party: Republican
- Education: University of Washington (BA)

John A. Svahn (born May 13, 1943 in New London, Connecticut) is an American former Republican politician. He served as 9th Commissioner of the Social Security Administration from 1981, as Under Secretary of Health and Human Services from March to September 1983, and as Assistant to the President for Policy Development from September 1983 in the administration of President Ronald Reagan.

Political offices
Preceded by Herbert Doggette; Acting	Commissioner of the Social Security Administration; 1981–1983	Succeeded by Martha McSteen; Acting
