= Charles D. Baker (attorney) =

American politician

Member of the New York State Assembly from the 2nd Steuben district
- In office January 6, 1885 – May 26, 1887
- Preceded by: Andrew B. Craig
- Succeeded by: Milo M. Acker

Assistant United States Attorney for the Southern District of New York
- In office c. 1889–1908

Personal details
- Born: Charles Duane Baker; September 17, 1846 Painted Post, New York, U.S.
- Died: April 23, 1934 (aged 87) New York City, New York, U.S.
- Party: Republican
- Spouse: Letitia Beattie Ronk (m. 1883)
- Children: 3
- Relatives: Charles D. Baker (grandson); Charlie Baker (great-grandson)
- Occupation: Attorney

Charles Duane Baker (September 17, 1846 – April 23, 1934) was an Assistant United States Attorney and a member of the New York State Assembly (1885–1887). He was the grandfather of Charles D. Baker (1928–2025) and great-grandfather of Charlie Baker (born 1956).

== Life and career ==
Baker was born in the village of Painted Post in Steuben County, New York. His mother, Elizabeth (Fleming) Baker, was the daughter of John Fleming, an early Painted Post settler. His father, Harrison H. Baker, was a millwright who became a lumber manufacturer later in his life. Growing up, Baker attended local public schools. He spent two years at Overland College before attending Cornell University in Ithaca, New York. He graduated from Cornell with a Bachelor of Arts in 1874. He was admitted to the bar in 1876.

He was a member of the New York State Assembly (Steuben Co., 2nd D.) in 1885, 1886 and 1887. Around 1889 he was appointed as Assistant United States Attorney for the Southern District of New York. He resigned in 1895 to return to private law, but was again appointed to the office several years later and served until 1908. In 1910 he was appointed by United States Attorney General George Woodward Wickersham to be special counsel and attorney for the newly organized New York City Department of Justice.

In January 1883, he married Letitia Beattie Ronk. They had three children, Charles Duane Jr., David Dudley Field, and Carolyn Beattie. Charles Jr. (1890–1971) had another son named Charles D. Baker (1928–2025), who served as a U.S. government official under Richard Nixon and Ronald Reagan administrations. His son, Charles IV (born 1956) served as the governor of Massachusetts from 2015 to 2023.

Baker died at St. Luke's Hospital in New York City at age 87. He was buried in Painted Post.

New York State Assembly
| Preceded by Andrew B. Craig | New York State Assembly; Steuben County, 2nd District; 1885–1887 | Succeeded by Milo M. Acker |
