= United States Secretary of Health and Human Services =

Government position

- Seal of the Department of Health and Human Services

- Flag of the secretary

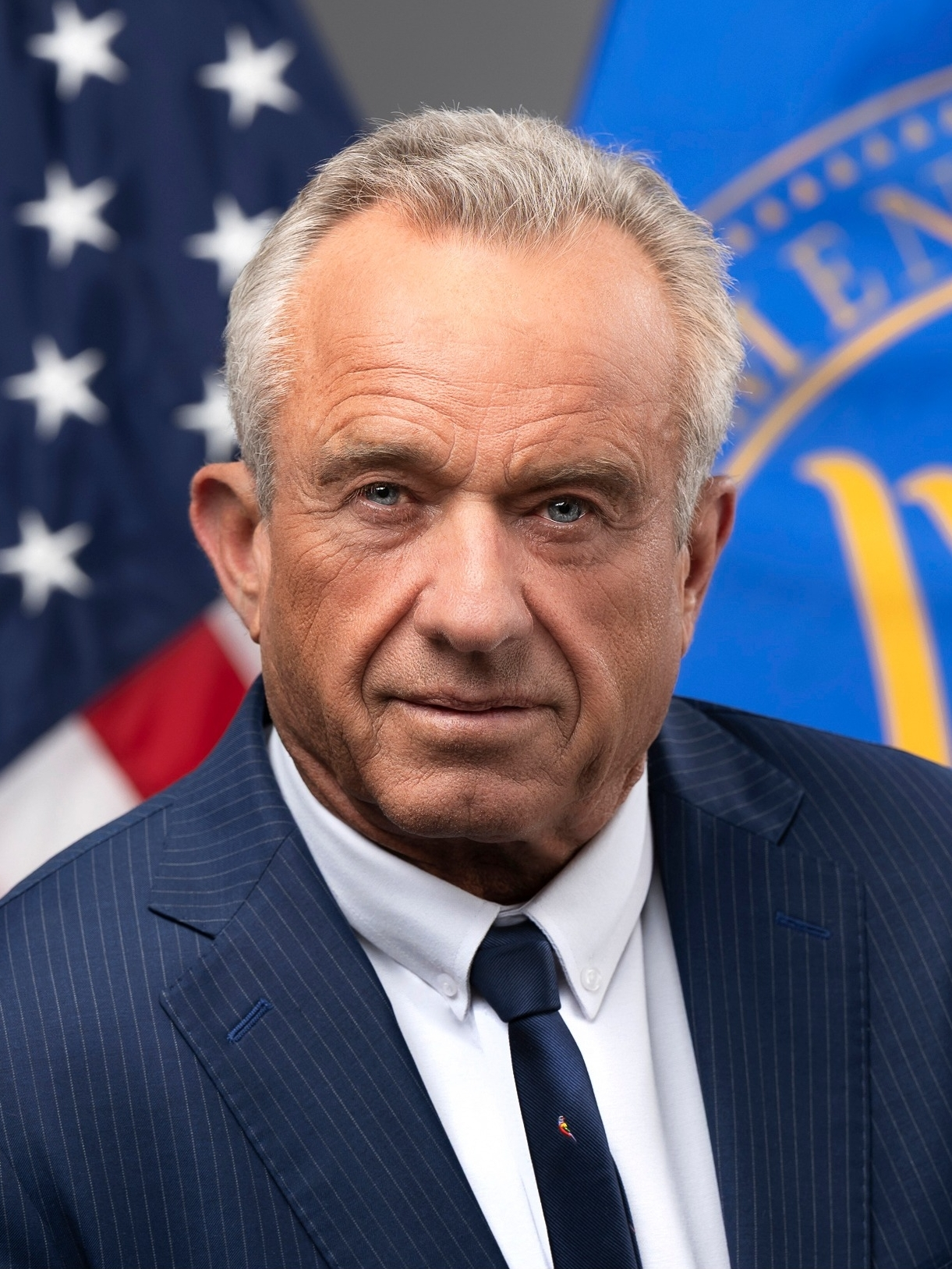
- Incumbent; Robert F. Kennedy Jr. since February 13, 2025
- United States Department of Health and Human Services
- Style: Mr. Secretary (informal); The Honorable (formal)
- Member of: Cabinet
- Reports to: President of the United States
- Seat: Hubert H. Humphrey Building, Washington, D.C.
- Appointer: The president; with advice and consent of the Senate
- Term length: No fixed term
- Constituting instrument: Reorganization Plan No. 1 of 1953; 67 Stat. 631; 42 U.S.C. § 3501
- Formation: April 11, 1953; 73 years ago
- First holder: Oveta Culp Hobby
- Succession: Twelfth
- Deputy: Deputy Secretary
- Salary: Executive Schedule, Level I
- Website: www.hhs.gov

The United States secretary of health and human services is the head of the United States Department of Health and Human Services, and serves as the principal advisor to the president of the United States on health matters. The secretary is a member of the United States Cabinet. Robert F. Kennedy Jr. is the incumbent secretary of health and human services, having held the position since February 13, 2025.

The office was formerly known as the secretary of health, education, and welfare. In 1980, the Department of Health, Education, and Welfare was renamed to Department of Health and Human Services, and its education functions and Rehabilitation Services Administration were transferred to the new United States Department of Education. Patricia Roberts Harris headed the department before and after it was renamed.

Nominations to the office are referred to the Health, Education, Labor and Pensions Committee and the United States Senate Committee on Finance, which has jurisdiction over Medicare and Medicaid, before confirmation is considered by the full United States Senate. The secretary of health and human services is a level I position in the Executive Schedule, thus earning a salary of US$250,600, as of January 2025.

== Duties ==
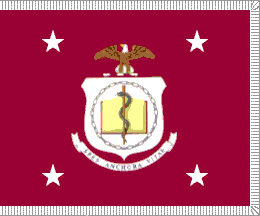
The flag of the secretary of health, education, and welfare, the predecessor to the current office

The duties of the secretary revolve around human conditions and concerns in the United States. This includes advising the president on matters of health, welfare, and income security programs. The secretary strives to administer the Department of Health and Human Services to carry out approved programs and make the public aware of the objectives of the department.

The Department of Health, Education and Welfare (HEW) was reorganized into a Department of Education and a Department of Health and Human Services (HHS).

The Department of Health and Human Services oversees 11 agencies including the Food and Drug Administration (FDA), Centers for Disease Control (CDC), National Institutes of Health (NIH), Administration for Children and Families (ACF) and Centers for Medicare & Medicaid Services (CMS).

== List of secretaries ==
Parties

Democratic (9) Republican (15) Independent (2)

Status Denotes acting HHS secretary

=== Health, Education, and Welfare ===
No.	Portrait	Name	State of residence	Took office	Left office	President(s)
1		Oveta Culp Hobby	Texas	April 11, 1953	July 31, 1955	Dwight D. Eisenhower (1953–1961)
2		Marion B. Folsom	New York	August 2, 1955	July 31, 1958	Dwight D. Eisenhower (1953–1961)
3		Arthur Flemming	Ohio	August 1, 1958	January 19, 1961	Dwight D. Eisenhower (1953–1961)
4		Abraham Ribicoff	Connecticut	January 21, 1961	July 13, 1962	John F. Kennedy (1961–1963)
5		Anthony J. Celebrezze	Ohio	July 31, 1962	August 17, 1965	John F. Kennedy (1961–1963)
5		Anthony J. Celebrezze	Ohio	July 31, 1962	August 17, 1965	Lyndon B. Johnson (1963–1969)
6		John W. Gardner	California	August 18, 1965	March 1, 1968	Lyndon B. Johnson (1963–1969)
7		Wilbur J. Cohen	Michigan	May 16, 1968	January 20, 1969	Lyndon B. Johnson (1963–1969)
8		Robert Finch	California	January 21, 1969	June 23, 1970	Richard Nixon (1969–1974)
9		Elliot Richardson	Massachusetts	June 24, 1970	January 29, 1973	Richard Nixon (1969–1974)
10		Caspar Weinberger	California	February 12, 1973	August 8, 1975	Richard Nixon (1969–1974)
10		Caspar Weinberger	California	February 12, 1973	August 8, 1975	Gerald Ford (1974–1977)
11		F. David Mathews	Alabama	August 8, 1975	January 20, 1977	Gerald Ford (1974–1977)
12		Joseph A. Califano Jr.	District of Columbia	January 25, 1977	August 3, 1979	Jimmy Carter (1977–1981)
13		Patricia Roberts Harris	District of Columbia	August 3, 1979	May 4, 1980	Jimmy Carter (1977–1981)

=== Health and Human Services ===
No.	Portrait	Name	State of residence	Took office	Left office	President(s)
13		Patricia Roberts Harris	District of Columbia	May 4, 1980	January 20, 1981	Jimmy Carter (1977–1981)
14		Richard Schweiker	Pennsylvania	January 22, 1981	February 3, 1983	Ronald Reagan (1981–1989)
15		Margaret Heckler	Massachusetts	March 10, 1983	December 13, 1985	Ronald Reagan (1981–1989)
16		Otis Bowen	Indiana	December 13, 1985	March 1, 1989	Ronald Reagan (1981–1989)
17		Louis W. Sullivan	Georgia	March 1, 1989	January 20, 1993	George H. W. Bush (1989–1993)
18		Donna Shalala	Wisconsin	January 22, 1993	January 20, 2001	Bill Clinton (1993–2001)
19		Tommy Thompson	Wisconsin	February 2, 2001	January 26, 2005	George W. Bush (2001–2009)
20		Mike Leavitt	Utah	January 26, 2005	January 20, 2009	George W. Bush (2001–2009)
–		Charles E. Johnson	Utah	January 20, 2009	April 28, 2009	Barack Obama (2009–2017)
21		Kathleen Sebelius	Kansas	April 28, 2009	June 9, 2014	Barack Obama (2009–2017)
22		Sylvia Mathews Burwell	West Virginia	June 9, 2014	January 20, 2017	Barack Obama (2009–2017)
–		Norris Cochran	Florida	January 20, 2017	February 10, 2017	Donald Trump (2017–2021)
23		Tom Price	Georgia	February 10, 2017	September 29, 2017	Donald Trump (2017–2021)
–		Don J. Wright	Virginia	September 29, 2017	October 10, 2017	Donald Trump (2017–2021)
–		Eric Hargan	Illinois	October 10, 2017	January 29, 2018	Donald Trump (2017–2021)
24		Alex Azar	Indiana	January 29, 2018	January 20, 2021	Donald Trump (2017–2021)
–		Norris Cochran	Florida	January 20, 2021	March 19, 2021	Joe Biden (2021–2025)
25		Xavier Becerra	California	March 19, 2021	January 20, 2025	Joe Biden (2021–2025)
–		Dorothy Fink	Pennsylvania	January 20, 2025	February 13, 2025	Donald Trump (2025–present)
26		Robert F. Kennedy Jr.	California	February 13, 2025	Incumbent	Donald Trump (2025–present)

== Line of succession ==
The line of succession for the secretary of health and human services is as follows:

1. Deputy Secretary of Health and Human Services.
2. General Counsel of the Department of Health and Human Services
3. Assistant Secretary for Administration
4. Assistant Secretary for Planning and Evaluation
5. Administrator of the Centers for Medicare and Medicaid Services
6. Commissioner of Food and Drugs
7. Director of the National Institutes of Health
8. Assistant Secretary for Children and Families
9. Other assistant secretaries (following in the order they took the oath of office)
  1. Assistant Secretary for Health
  2. Assistant Secretary for Preparedness and Response
  3. Assistant Secretary for Legislation
  4. Assistant Secretary for Public Affairs
  5. Assistant Secretary for Financial Resources
  6. Assistant Secretary for Aging
10. Director of the Centers for Disease Control and Prevention
11. Director, Region 4 (Atlanta, Georgia)

U.S. order of precedence (ceremonial)
Preceded by Keith Sonderling as Secretary of Labor	Order of precedence of the United States as Secretary of Health and Human Services	Succeeded by Scott Turner as Secretary of Housing and Urban Development
U.S. presidential line of succession
Preceded by Secretary of Labor; Keith Sonderling	12th in line	Succeeded by Secretary of Housing and Urban Development; Scott Turner
