= Wisconsin's Dane County 2nd Assembly district =

Former American legislative district

Wisconsin's Dane County 2nd State Assembly district
- Obsolete
- Notes: 1848–1972

Wisconsin's Dane County 2nd Assembly district was a district in the Wisconsin State Assembly for most of the history of the state of Wisconsin, up to the legislative redistricting reforms of 1972 which created the current numbered districts. Located in central Wisconsin, the district was one of the 66 original Assembly districts defined in Article XIV of the Constitution of Wisconsin; it originally comprised the western half of Dane County, Wisconsin, including the city of Madison.

The district was in use for the first 124 years of Wisconsin's history, from 1848 to 1972.

== List of representatives ==
List of representatives from the Dane County 2nd district
Member	Party	Residence	Term start	Term end	Leg.
District created
Ebenezer Brigham	Whig	Blue Mounds	June 5, 1848	January 1, 1849	1st
Ira W. Bird	Whig	Madison	January 1, 1849	January 7, 1850	2nd
Chauncey Abbott	Whig	Madison	January 7, 1850	January 6, 1851	3rd
Augustus A. Bird	Dem.	Madison	January 6, 1851	January 5, 1852	4th
Alexander Botkin	Whig	Madison	January 5, 1852	January 3, 1853	5th
Henry L. Foster	Dem.	Deerfield	January 3, 1853	January 2, 1854	6th
Samuel H. Baker	Dem.	Bristol	January 2, 1854	January 1, 1855	7th
William Robert Taylor	Dem.	Cottage Grove	January 1, 1855	January 7, 1856	8th
Augustus A. Huntington	Dem.	York	January 7, 1856	January 5, 1857	9th
Robert W. Davison	Rep.	Beverly	January 5, 1857	January 4, 1858	10th
John E. Sharp	Rep.	Door Creek	January 4, 1858	January 3, 1859	11th
Adam Smith	Dem.	Burke	January 3, 1859	January 2, 1860	12th
Eleazor Grover	Dem.	Madison	January 2, 1860	January 7, 1861	13th
Willard H. Chandler	Rep.	Windsor	January 7, 1861	January 1, 1863	14th 15th
William H. Miller	Rep.	Door Creek	January 1, 1863	January 4, 1864	16th
William H. Miller	Union	Door Creek	January 4, 1864	January 2, 1865	17th
Abram Boyce	Union	Lodi	January 2, 1865	January 1, 1866	18th
John M. Flint	Union	Sun Prairie	January 1, 1866	January 6, 1868	19th 20th
Knute Nelson	Rep.	Cambridge	January 6, 1868	January 3, 1870	21st 22nd
Willard H. Chandler	Rep.	Sun Prairie	January 3, 1870	January 2, 1871	23rd
Knudt Heimdal	Dem.	Deerfield	January 2, 1871	January 1, 1872	24th
John D. Gurnee	Dem.	Madison	January 1, 1872	January 6, 1873	25th
Levi Baker Vilas	Dem.	Madison	January 6, 1873	January 5, 1874	26th
Philo Dunning	Ref.	Madison	January 5, 1874	January 4, 1875	27th
Silas U. Pinney	Dem.	Madison	January 4, 1875	January 3, 1876	28th
William Charlton	Lib.R.	Madison	January 3, 1876	January 1, 1877	29th
Phineas Baldwin	Rep.	Oregon	January 1, 1877	January 7, 1878	30th
Edwin E. Bryant	Rep.	Madison	January 7, 1878	January 6, 1879	31st
Buel Hutchinson	Rep.	Madison	January 6, 1879	January 5, 1880	32nd
Thomas Beattie	Rep.	Stoughton	January 5, 1880	January 3, 1881	33rd
Louis K. Luse	Rep.	Stoughton	January 3, 1881	January 2, 1882	34th
Elisha W. Keyes	Rep.	Madison	January 2, 1882	January 1, 1883	35th
Clement Warner	Rep.	Windsor	January 1, 1883	January 5, 1885	36th
Charles Edwin Buell	Rep.	Sun Prairie	January 5, 1885	January 3, 1887	37th
Hans Grinde	Rep.	Deforest	January 3, 1887	January 7, 1889	38th
William Fehlandt	Dem.	Mazomanie	January 7, 1889	January 5, 1891	39th
Christian Reuter	Dem.	Roxbury	January 5, 1891	January 2, 1893	40th
Isaac Brader	Dem.	Waunakee	January 2, 1893	January 7, 1895	41st
Hiland J. Spaulding	Rep.	Vienna	January 7, 1895	January 4, 1897	42nd
Christopher Legreid	Rep.	Cambridge	January 4, 1897	January 2, 1899	43rd
Nicholas Anderson	Rep.	Albion	January 2, 1899	January 7, 1901	44th
Ole K. Roe	Rep.	Stoughton	January 7, 1901	January 5, 1903	45th
Torger G. Thompson	Rep.	Deerfield	January 5, 1903	January 2, 1905	46th
Henry Huber	Rep.	Stoughton	January 2, 1905	January 7, 1907	47th
Ole P. Sorenson	Rep.	Marshall	January 7, 1907	January 4, 1909	48th
Otto Onstad	Rep.	Christiana	January 4, 1909	January 6, 1913	49th 50th
Edward C. Meland	Rep.	DeForest	January 6, 1913	January 4, 1915	51st
William Nelson	Rep.	Deerfield	January 4, 1915	January 1, 1917	52nd
James C. Hanson	Rep.	Christiana; Deerfield	January 1, 1917	January 7, 1935	53rd 54th 55th 56th 57th 58th 59th 60th 61st
James C. Hanson	Prog.	Christiana; Deerfield	January 7, 1935	January 6, 1941	62nd 63rd 64th
Lars O. Lein	Prog.	Edgerton	January 6, 1941	January 4, 1943	65th
Earl Mullen	Prog.	Blooming Grove	January 4, 1943	January 6, 1947	66th 67th
Earl Mullen	Rep.	Blooming Grove	January 6, 1947	January 3, 1949	68th
John M. Blaska	Rep.	Marshall	January 3, 1949	January 1, 1951	69th
William Proxmire	Dem.	Madison	January 1, 1951	January 5, 1953	70th
Carl W. Thompson	Dem.	Stoughton	January 5, 1953	January 3, 1955	71st
Ivan A. Nestingen	Dem.	Madison	January 3, 1955	April 16, 1956	72nd
--Vacant--			April 16, 1956	January 7, 1957	72nd
Fred Risser	Dem.	Madison	January 7, 1957	January 7, 1963	73rd 74th 75th
Edward Nager	Dem.	Madison	January 7, 1963	January 1, 1973	76th 77th 78th 79th 80th
District abolished by 1971 Wisconsin Act 304; Dane County was divided between the 37th, 38th, 46th, 47th, 50th, 76th, 77th, and 78th Assembly districts The Dane County 2nd district did not have a close analogue in the new map
