= Ira W. Bird =

American politician (1819–1899)

1st Mayor of Jefferson, Wisconsin
- In office April 1878 – April 1879
- Preceded by: himself (as village president)
- Succeeded by: John Reinel Jr.

Judge of Jefferson County, Wisconsin
- In office January 1, 1862 – January 1, 1874
- Preceded by: Samuel Baird
- Succeeded by: Aaron Rankin

Clerk of Jefferson County, Wisconsin
- In office January 1, 1859 – January 1, 1861
- Preceded by: O. C. Merriman
- Succeeded by: William P. Forsyth

Member of the Wisconsin State Assembly from the Dane 2nd district
- In office January 1, 1849 – January 7, 1850
- Preceded by: Ebenezer Brigham
- Succeeded by: Chauncey Abbott

Sheriff of Dane County, Wisconsin
- In office January 6, 1845 – January 5, 1846
- Preceded by: Augustus A. Bird
- Succeeded by: Peter W. Matts

Register of Deeds of Dane County, Wisconsin
- In office January 4, 1847 – January 3, 1848
- Preceded by: J. G. Knapp
- Succeeded by: J. D. Ruggles
- In office November 1841 – January 6, 1845
- Preceded by: Robert L. Ream
- Succeeded by: G. T. Long

Personal details
- Born: March 17, 1819 Oneida County, New York, U.S.
- Died: March 11, 1899 (aged 79) Jefferson, Wisconsin, U.S.
- Resting place: Greenwood Cemetery, Jefferson, Wisconsin
- Party: Republican; Whig (before 1854)
- Spouses: Antoinette Ruby Brayton (m. 1852; died 1860); Mary Emily Howes
- Children: with Antoinette Brayton; Ella Antoinette (Kirkland)^{(b. 1853; died 1926)}; Jessie Louise Bird^{(b. 1856; died 1858)}; with Mary Howes; Ralph William Bird^{(b. 1864; died 1931)}; Isabelle (Copeland)^{(b. 1868; died 1911)}; Jeanetta Bird^{(b. 1874; died 1944)}; Edgar Bird^{(b. 1877; died 1878)}
- Relatives: Augustus A. Bird (brother)

Military service
- Allegiance: United States
- Branch/service: Wisconsin militia California militia
- Years of service: 1846–1848 (Wis.); 1850–1852 (Ca.)
- Rank: Lt. Colonel (Wis.); Quartermaster (Ca.)
- Battles/wars: Yuma War

Ira Washington Bird (March 17, 1819 – March 11, 1899) was an American lawyer, Republican politician, and Wisconsin pioneer. In the Wisconsin Territory era, he served as sheriff and register of deeds of Dane County, then after Wisconsin achieved statehood, he represented Dane County in the Wisconsin State Assembly in the 2nd Wisconsin Legislature (1849). Later he moved to Jefferson County, where he served several years as village president of Jefferson, Wisconsin, served 12 years as county judge, and finally served as the first mayor of Jefferson.

His elder brother, Augustus A. Bird, was also a prominent early Wisconsin settler, he served as mayor of Madison, Wisconsin, and represented Madison in the state Assembly.

== Biography ==
Ira Bird was born in Oneida County, New York, in 1819, and received a public school education in Oneida County. His father died in 1833, and his mother died just six years later. In 1836, Bird went west to Milwaukee, Wisconsin Territory, with most of his siblings, led by elder brother Augustus A. Bird. Arriving in 1836, they became some of the earliest American settlers in Wisconsin. Augustus led the family in a construction business, and staked a claim to land in Milwaukee (though the claims were not yet legal).

In 1837, Augustus was appointed as a commissioner to oversee construction of Wisconsin's first state capitol building, in Madison, Wisconsin. Initially, elder brothers Augustus and George went to Madison, while Ira remained in Milwaukee to sustain the family's claims; while living in Milwaukee, Ira earned money working as a clerk in a store owned by Milwaukee founder Solomon Juneau. In 1838, however, Ira also went to Madison to assist his brothers in the capitol construction project.

The brothers became active in politics with the Whig Party in Madison, and in 1841, Bird was the Whig Party nominee for register of deeds of Dane County (and Sauk County, which was then attached to Dane for administrative purposes). Bird won the September election 92–70, defeating Democratic incumbent Robert L. Ream. He served three years then, in 1844, he was elected to succeed his brother as sheriff. In 1846, he was appointed lieutenant colonel of the Dane County militia, by Governor Henry Dodge. That fall, Bird had the first defeat in his political career, losing the election for county clerk.

While attending to his official duties, he read law in the offices of Thomas W. Sutherland, and was admitted to practice law in 1847. Bird was an outspoken supporter of the first proposed constitution for Wisconsin, but voters rejected the document in an April 1847 referendum. The following year, voters ratified a constitution and Wisconsin achieved statehood. In the fall of 1848, Bird was elected to the Wisconsin State Assembly in Dane County's 2nd district (the western half of the county).

After completing his legislative duties, Bird went west to seek opportunities in the California gold rush. In California, Bird served in public office again, as city attorney in San Diego, California, and later as an assistant clerk in the California Senate. During his time in southern California, he was also quartermaster for a state militia expedition to retaliate for the Garra Revolt.

Bird returned to Madison in 1852 and married later that year. His wife's parents were well-established in neighboring Jefferson County, and Bird soon moved east to reside there with his wife. Bird opened a law practice in Jefferson, Wisconsin, and quickly became a leading member of the community.

After the Whig Party collapsed in 1854, Bird became a member of the Republican Party, though Bird became much less active in political affairs in Jefferson County, focusing instead on nonpartisan and local priorities. In 1855 and 1856, he served as justice of the peace and town clerk; in 1858 he was elected county clerk. After the village of Jefferson was incorporated, Bird was elected the 3rd village president in 1860. In 1861, Bird was elected county judge, and was subsequently re-elected in 1865 and 1869, ultimately serving until 1874. While serving as judge, he was elected again as village president in 1871, 1872, 1875, and 1877. Jefferson was re-incorporated as a city in 1878, and at the first city election, Bird was elected mayor.

For many years in Jefferson, Bird operated his law firm in partnership with his nephew, George W. Bird—son of Augustus. Bird largely receded from public office after serving as mayor, though he did serve a few more terms on the Jefferson County Board of Supervisors.

Bird suffered a bad case of Influenza in February 1899, remaining ill for about a month. He died of the disease on the morning of March 11, 1899.

== Personal life and family ==
Ira W. Bird was the ninth of 11 children born to Zenas W. Bird (1777–1833) and his wife Tabitha (née Burgoyne; 1780–1839). The Bird family were descendants of the colonist Thomas Bird, who emigrated to the Connecticut Colony sometime before 1662.

Ira Bird's maternal grandfather, Augustus Burgoyne, was a nephew of the British general John Burgoyne, and had come to the Americas as a surgeon for the British Army in the American Revolutionary War. Augustus Burgoyne was captured by American forces after the Battle of Bennington, and while being held as a prisoner of war, he was fed by an American woman named Ann Rice. Burgoyne married Ann Rice in 1779 and remained in Vermont after the war; Ira Bird's mother was the eldest of their eight children.

Several of Bird's siblings went on to notable lives in Wisconsin:

- Augustus Allen Bird (1802–1870) was instrumental in the construction of the first Wisconsin state capitol, he was the 2nd mayor of Madison, and served two terms in the state Assembly.
  - George Washington Bird (1837–1912) was a son of Augustus and longtime law partner of Ira, in Jefferson. He was prominent in the Dane County Democratic Party, served as private secretary to Wisconsin governor William Robert Taylor, and was later an unsuccessful candidate for U.S. Congress, U.S. Senate, and Wisconsin governor.
- Charles Hopkins Bird (1813–1883) went with Augustus on the Wisconsin state capitol construction job. During their initial journey to Madison, Charles famously carved a tree with the name "Sun Prairie", after a rain storm; his carving became the name of the township—Sun Prairie, Wisconsin. Charles later settled in the township and lived the rest of his life there.
- Zenus W. Bird (1817–1843) moved to Wisconsin with his brothers, but died young, becoming the first estate administed in the probate court of Dane County, Wisconsin.
- William D. Bird (1821–1905) went with Augustus and George in the caravan from Milwaukee to Madison to build the state capitol, he became a successful farmer and later enlisted in the Union Army during the Civil War.

Ira W. Bird married twice, his first wife was Antoinette Ruby Brayton, whose family were successful pioneers in Aztalan, Wisconsin. They married in 1852 and had two daughters, though one died in childhood. Antoinette died in 1860, at age 28. Bird subsequently married Mary Emily Howes in 1864 and had four more children, though the last died in infancy.

Bird's eldest daughter Ella, from his first marriage, married Scottish immigrant Robert Kirkland, who had read law in Bird's office and had a successful law practice in Jefferson.

Bird's only surviving son, Ralph W. Bird, had a 44-year career in the U.S. postal service; he established many rural routes in Wisconsin and worked as a postal inspector before becoming assistant postmaster at Milwaukee.

Wisconsin State Assembly
Preceded by Ebenezer Brigham	Member of the Wisconsin State Assembly from the Dane 2nd district January 1, 1849 – January 7, 1850	Succeeded by Chauncey Abbott
Political offices
Preceded by Robert L. Ream	Register of Deeds of Dane County, Wisconsin; November 1841 – January 6, 1845	Succeeded by G. T. Long
Preceded by J. G. Knapp	Register of Deeds of Dane County, Wisconsin; January 4, 1847 – January 3, 1848	Succeeded by J. D. Ruggles
Preceded by O. C. Merriman	Register of Deeds of Dane County, Wisconsin; January 1, 1859 – January 1, 1861	Succeeded by William P. Forsyth
City incorporated	Mayor of Jefferson, Wisconsin; April 1878 – April 1879	Succeeded by John Reinel Jr.
Legal offices
Preceded by Augustus A. Bird	Sheriff of Dane County, Wisconsin; January 6, 1845 – January 5, 1846	Succeeded by P. W. Matts
Preceded by Samuel Baird	Judge of Jefferson County, Wisconsin; January 1, 1862 – January 1, 1874	Succeeded by Aaron Rankin
