= Albion, Wisconsin =

Albion is the name of some places in the U.S. state of Wisconsin:

- Albion, Dane County, Wisconsin, a town
  - Albion (community), Wisconsin, an unincorporated community
- Albion, Jackson County, Wisconsin, a town
- Albion, Trempealeau County, Wisconsin, a town
