= James C. Hanson =

20th century American politician

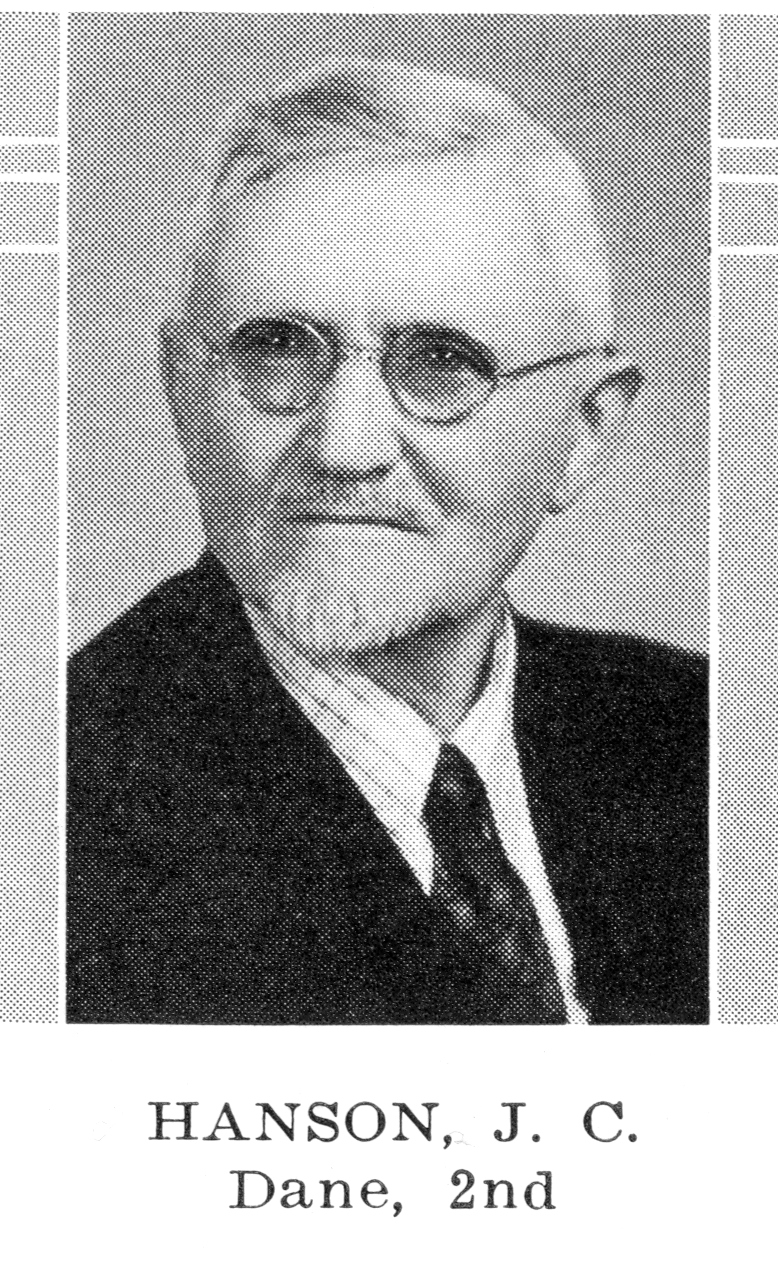

Member of the Wisconsin State Assembly from the Dane 2nd district
- In office January 1, 1917 – January 6, 1941
- Preceded by: William Nelson
- Succeeded by: Lars O. Lein

Personal details
- Born: July 11, 1862 Slysrup, Denmark
- Died: February 1, 1946 (aged 83) Christiana, Dane County, Wisconsin, U.S.
- Party: Republican
- Occupation: Farmer

James C. Hanson (July 11, 1862 – February 1, 1946) was a Danish American immigrant, farmer, insurance executive, and Republican politician. He was a member of the Wisconsin State Assembly for twelve terms, representing eastern Dane County from 1917 through 1941.

== Background and work ==
Hanson was born at Slysrup on the island of Lolland, Denmark on July 11, 1862. His family left Denmark for Christiana, Dane County, Wisconsin when he was a child; his father, a brother, and a sister all died during a cholera epidemic during the voyage. He went to Albion Academy and Milton College.

Later, he lived in Deerfield, Wisconsin. He was a farmer, and active in the cooperative movement. He also worked as a director of the Albion Insurance Company, retiring after fifty years in March 1943.

== Legislative career and after ==
Hanson was a member of the Assembly from 1917 to 1940. He was a member of the Republican Party and the Wisconsin Progressive Party.

He died of a heart attack at his daughter's home in Christiana in 1946.
