= Samuel Stephens Miller =

American politician

Samuel Stephens Miller (born July 17, 1850) was an American pharmacist from Whitehall, Wisconsin who became a lawyer. He served a single term as a Republican member of the Wisconsin State Assembly.

== Background ==
Miller was born in the town of Christiana in Dane County, on July 17, 1850. He went to public schools, then attended Albion Academy and Normal Institute for four years, graduating in 1870. He worked as a pharmacist in Grand Rapids, Wisconsin for two years, but had medical problems. He entered the University of Wisconsin Law School in September 1872, and graduated in the Class of 1873. He worked in a law office in Eau Claire until 1877, when he moved to Whitehall.

== Elected office ==
Miller was elected district attorney of Trempealeau County in 1891. He had held that office for six years when he was e!ected to the Assembly's Trempealeau County district in 1886, with 1,733 votes to 1,079 for Democratic nominee Thomas Thompson and 323 for Probitionist D. Wood. He was assigned as chairman of the standing committee on legislative expenditures.
