= Simeon Mills =

American politician (1810–1895)

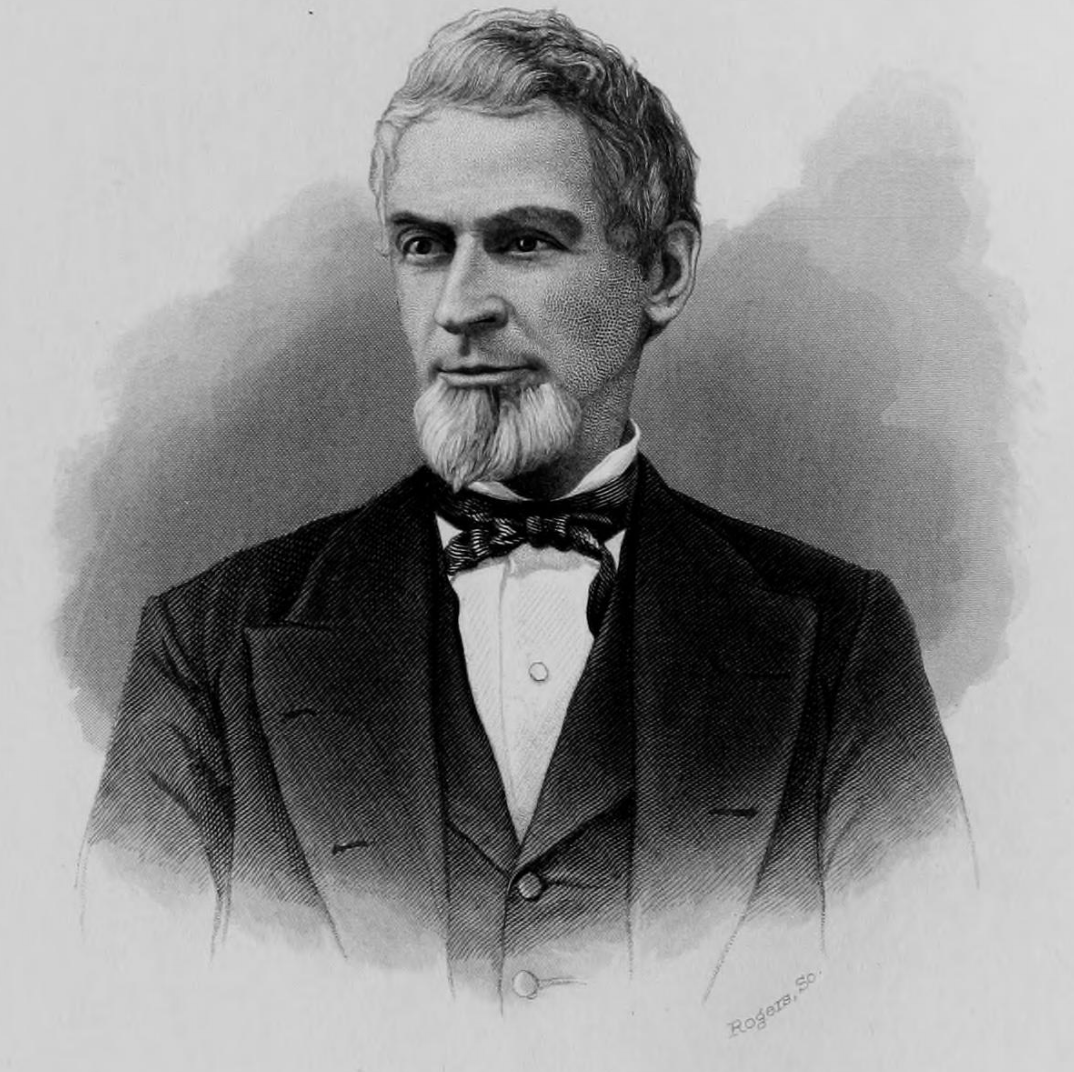

Member of the Wisconsin Senate from the 9th district
- In office June 7, 1848 – January 1, 1849
- Preceded by: Position Established
- Succeeded by: Alexander Botkin

4th & 7th Village President of Madison, Wisconsin
- In office 1854–1855
- Preceded by: Horace A. Tenney
- Succeeded by: Peter Van Bergen
- In office 1851–1852
- Preceded by: William N. Seymour
- Succeeded by: Chauncey Abbott

Personal details
- Born: Simeon Mills; February 14, 1810 Norfolk, Connecticut
- Died: June 1, 1895 (aged 85) Madison, Wisconsin
- Resting place: Forest Hill Cemetery; Madison, Wisconsin
- Party: Democratic
- Spouses: Maria Louisa Smith; (died 1884)
- Profession: politician
- Known for: Introduced bill establishing University of Wisconsin
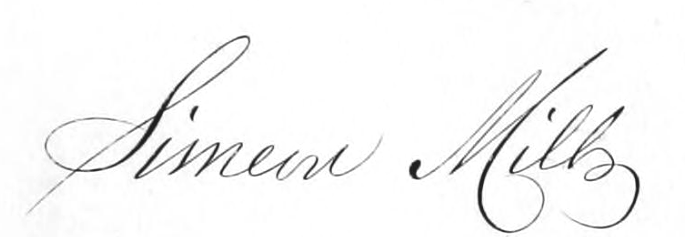
- Signature

Simeon Mills (February 14, 1810 – June 1, 1895) was a Democratic member of the Wisconsin State Senate from Dane County in the 1st Wisconsin Legislature. He introduced the bill which became the charter for the University of Wisconsin.

== Biography ==
Mills was born in 1810. Named assistant postmaster, he walked from Chicago to Madison, Wisconsin Territory, arriving in June 1837. Mills met John Catlin and became the first Deputy Postmaster of Madison in 1837, housing the post office itself in his own store. He was the Clerk of the District Court of Dane County and the Clerk of the Supreme Court of the Wisconsin Territory. Mills was the last treasurer of the territory and was elected to the 1st Wisconsin Legislature in 1848. During the American Civil War, he was the Paymaster of Wisconsin. Mills died in 1895.

== "Elmside" ==
His former home, known as the Simeon Mills House, "Mills Folly," or "Elmside", was added to the National Register of Historic Places in 1997. It was built in 1863 and he resided there until 1867, when he sold it to J. W. Hudson. The structure, now a multi-family residence, suffered $100,000 in damage in a fire June 21, 2012.

An area where a number of his businesses were located, now known as the Simeon Mills Historic District, is also listed.

== Career ==
Prior to serving in the Senate, Mills was Treasurer of the Wisconsin Territory, President of Madison, and a Justice of the Peace.

== Photo gallery ==
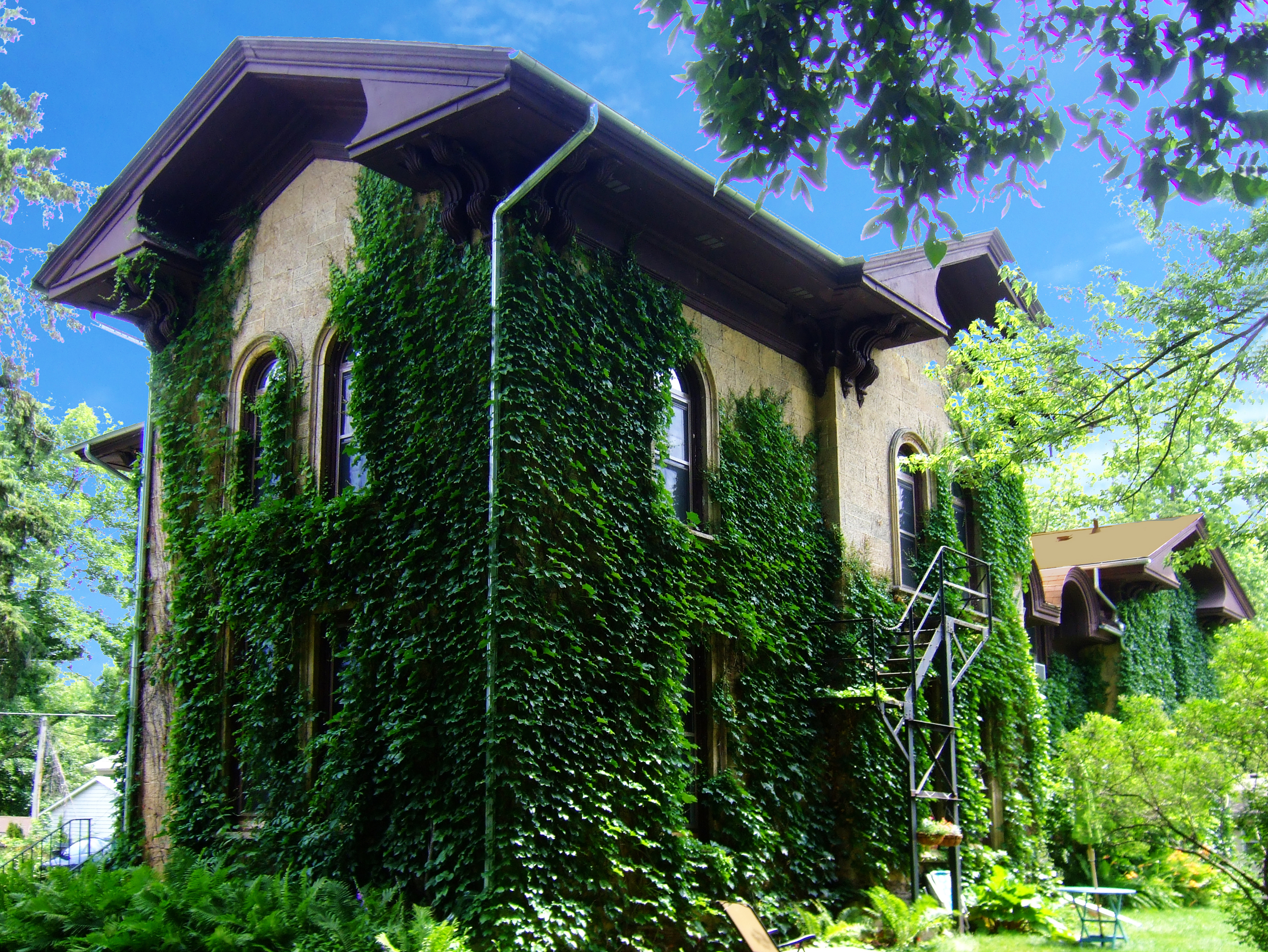
Simeon Mills House

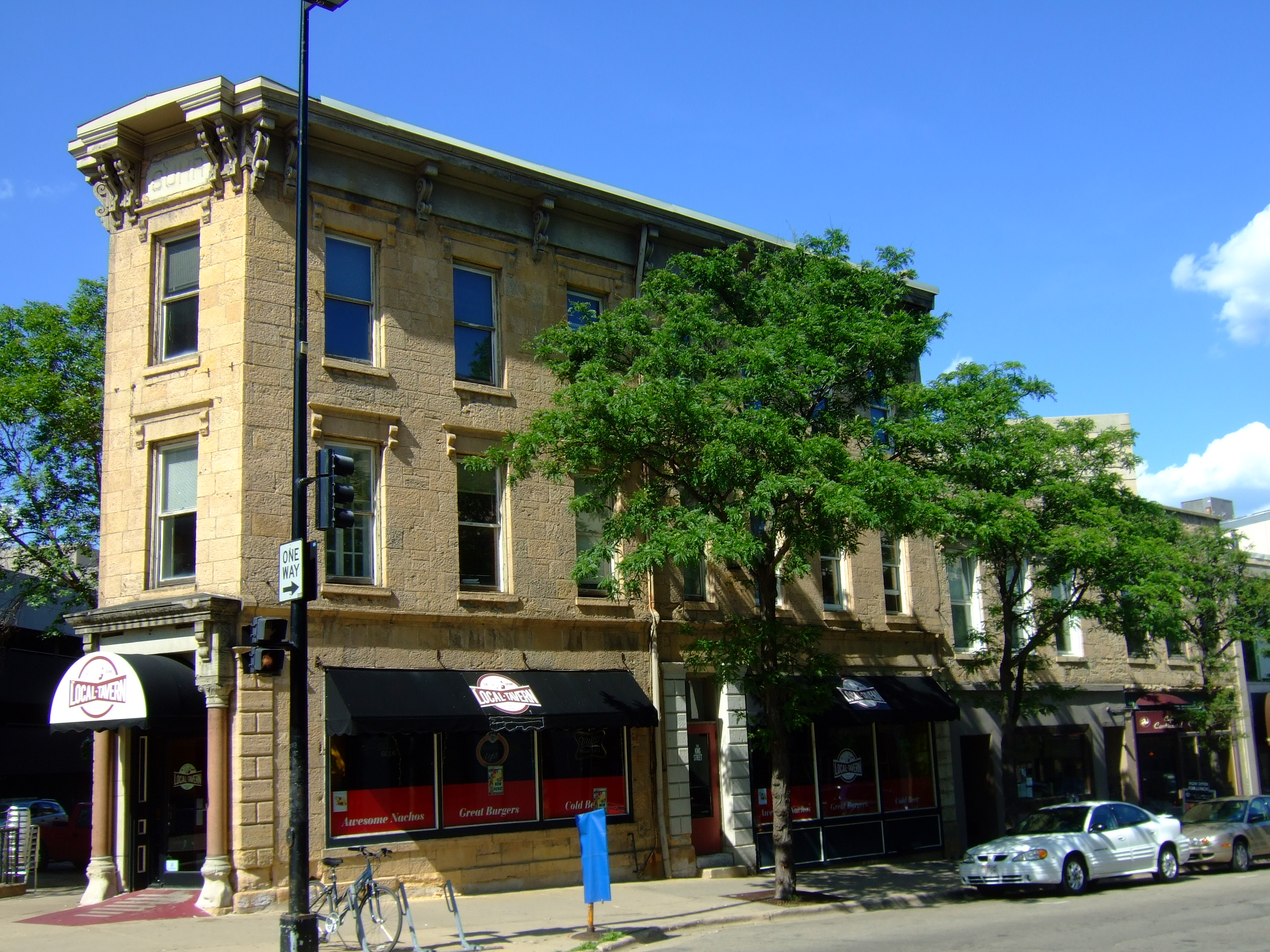
A portion of the Simeon Mills Historic District.
