= Rockdale, Wisconsin =

- Village
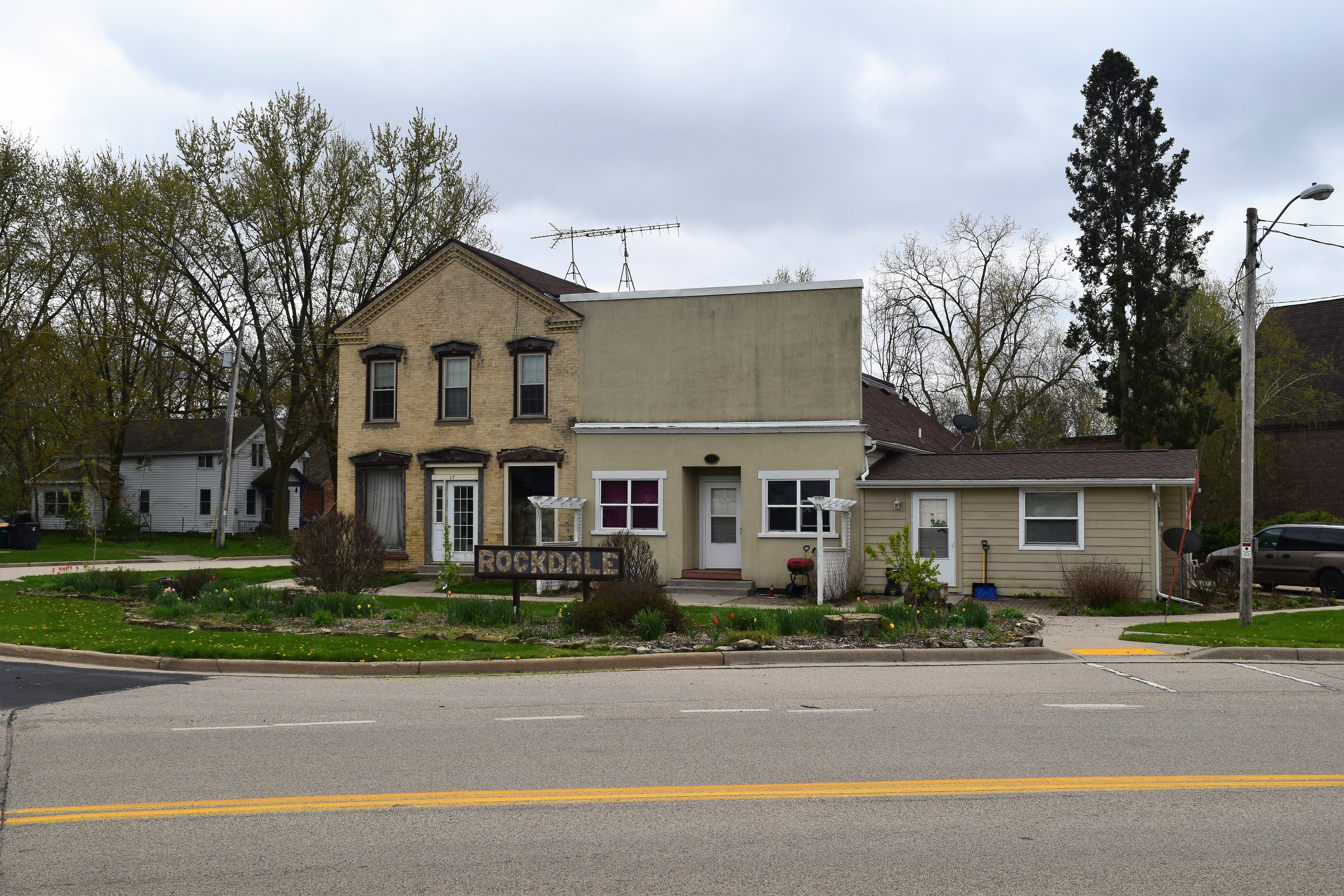

- Location of Rockdale in Dane County, Wisconsin.
- Coordinates: 42°58′21″N 89°2′2″W
- Country: United States
- State: Wisconsin
- County: Dane

Area
  - Total: 0.30 sq mi (0.77 km^{2})
  - Land: 0.28 sq mi (0.73 km^{2})
  - Water: 0.015 sq mi (0.04 km^{2})
- Elevation: 833 ft (254 m)

Population (2020)
  - Total: 207
  - Density: 769/sq mi (296.9/km^{2})
- Time zone: UTC-6 (Central (CST))
  - Summer (DST): UTC-5 (CDT)
- Area code: 608
- FIPS code: 55-68725
- GNIS feature ID: 1572479
- Website: http://www.villageofrockdale.com/

Rockdale is a village in Dane County, Wisconsin, United States. The population was 207 at the 2020 census, making it the smallest incorporated municipality in Dane County. The village is split in half by the Koshkonong Creek. It is part of the Madison, Wisconsin metropolitan area.

== Geography ==
Rockdale is located in the Town of Christiana at 42°58′21″N 89°2′2″W (42.972476, -89.033886).

According to the United States Census Bureau, the village has a total area of 0.24 square miles (0.62 km^{2}), of which 0.23 square miles (0.60 km^{2}) is land and 0.01 square miles (0.03 km^{2}) is water.

== Demographics ==
Historical population
Census	Pop.	Note	%±
1920	139		—
1930	135		−2.9%
1940	136		0.7%
1950	161		18.4%
1960	191		18.6%
1970	172		−9.9%
1980	200		16.3%
1990	235		17.5%
2000	214		−8.9%
2010	214		0.0%
2020	207		−3.3%
U.S. Decennial Census

=== 2010 census ===
As of the census of 2010, there were 214 people, 89 households, and 60 families living in the village. The population density was 930.4 inhabitants per square mile (359.2/km^{2}). There were 94 housing units at an average density of 408.7 per square mile (157.8/km^{2}). The racial makeup of the village was 99.1% White, 0.5% Asian, and 0.5% from two or more races. Hispanic or Latino of any race were 1.9% of the population.

There were 89 households, of which 29.2% had children under the age of 18 living with them, 55.1% were married couples living together, 9.0% had a female householder with no husband present, 3.4% had a male householder with no wife present, and 32.6% were non-families. 23.6% of all households were made up of individuals, and 3.3% had someone living alone who was 65 years of age or older. The average household size was 2.40 and the average family size was 2.92.

The median age in the village was 39 years. 24.3% of residents were under the age of 18; 7.9% were between the ages of 18 and 24; 29.4% were from 25 to 44; 26.5% were from 45 to 64; and 11.7% were 65 years of age or older. The gender makeup of the village was 53.7% male and 46.3% female.

=== 2000 census ===
As of the census of 2000, there were 214 people, 89 households, and 60 families living in the village. The population density was 914.7 people per square mile (359.2/km^{2}). There were 91 housing units at an average density of 388.9 per square mile (152.8/km^{2}). The racial makeup of the village was 99.07% White, 0.47% African American, and 0.47% from two or more races. Hispanic or Latino of any race were 0.47% of the population.

Ancestries: German (59.3%), Norwegian (38.8%), English (15.9%), Irish (15.0%), French (10.3%), Scots-Irish (4.7%).

There were 89 households, out of which 32.6% had children under the age of 18 living with them, 51.7% were married couples living together, 7.9% had a female householder with no husband present, and 31.5% were non-families. 21.3% of all households were made up of individuals, and 5.6% had someone living alone who was 65 years of age or older. The average household size was 2.40 and the average family size was 2.84.

In the village, the population was 26.2% under the age of 18, 4.7% from 18 to 24, 30.4% from 25 to 44, 28.0% from 45 to 64, and 10.7% who were 65 years of age or older. The median age was 38 years. For every 100 females, there were 105.8 males. For every 100 females age 18 and over, there were 90.4 males.

The median income for a household in the village was $37,500, and the median income for a family was $48,281. Males had a median income of $36,667 versus $23,250 for females. The per capita income for the village was $19,416. About 9.5% of families and 8.8% of the population were below the poverty line, including 14.5% of those under the age of eighteen and 13.0% of those 65 or over.
