= Otto Onstad =

American politician

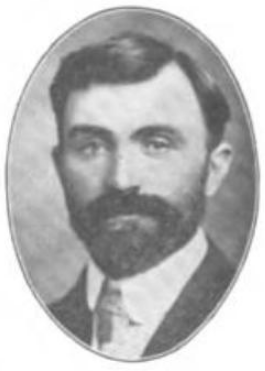

Member of the Wisconsin State Assembly
- In office 1908–1912
- Constituency: Dane County Second District

Personal details
- Born: Peder Otto Onstad; June 4, 1874 Christiana, Dane County, Wisconsin, US
- Died: March 17, 1961 (aged 86) Stoughton, Wisconsin, US
- Party: Republican
- Education: Luther College
- Occupation: Teacher, farmer, politician

Peder Otto Onstad (June 4, 1874 – March 17, 1961) was an American educator and politician who served as a member of the Wisconsin State Assembly.

== Early life and education ==
Peter Otto Onstad was born in Christiana, Dane County, Wisconsin. He was one of ten children born to Johannes (John) Christensen Onstad and his wife Anna Lee. His maternal grandfather Erik Lee was a supporter of the Haugean movement and left Norway following religious persecution, becoming the first settler in the Christiana area. His brother L. Henry Onstad lived in Stoughton until his death. His brother Erick J. Onstad served as an attorney and was deputy state treasurer of Wisconsin underneath Solomon Levitan in the 1920s. Following the death of one of his siblings, Onstad raised four of his nieces and nephews.

He attended Albion Academy and later studied at Luther College in Decorah, Iowa. He later began teaching in Cambridge and returned to teach at Albion Academy, specialising in mathematics. In 1901, Onstad left education and returned to farming.

== Political career ==
In 1909, Onstad was elected to represent Dane County in the Wisconsin State Assembly as a member of the Republican Party. He was reelected in 1911. In 1913, he served as superintendent of public property for the Wisconsin State Capitol.

In 1932, he moved to Madison and served as inspector of the Wisconsin Highway Commission for two years. In 1935, he began joined the register of deeds staff for Dane County.

== Personal life ==
He was a member of East Koshkonong Lutheran Church in Cambridge and Trinity Lutheran Church in Madison.

Onstad died in Stoughton on March 17, 1961.
