= Simeon Mills Historic District =

Historic district in Wisconsin, United States

- U.S. National Register of Historic Places
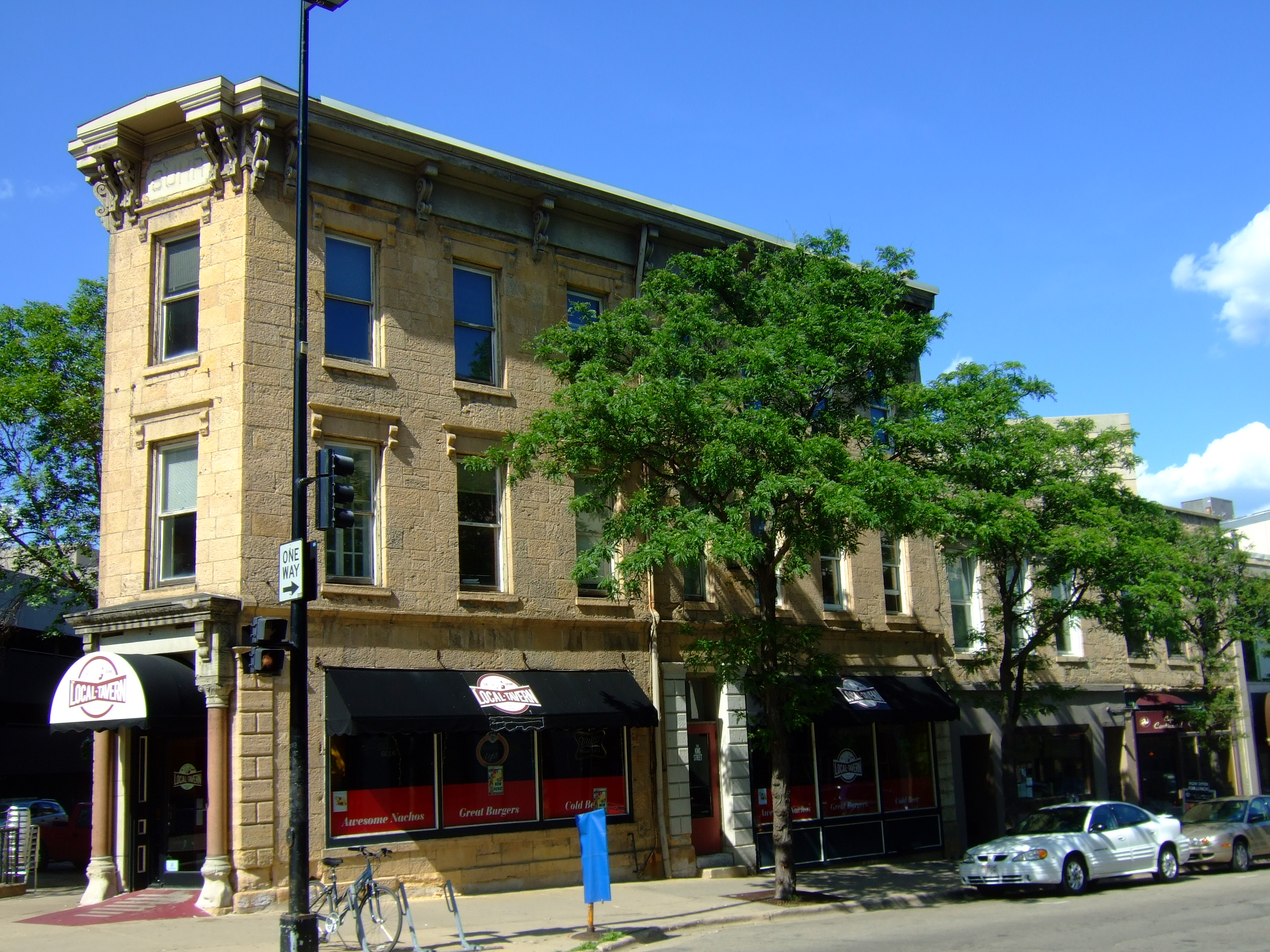
- Suhr bank, Italianate style, 1887
- Location: 102--118 King and 115--123 E. Main Sts., Madison, Wisconsin
- Area: 0.6 acres (0.24 ha)
- NRHP reference No.: 87001063
- Added to NRHP: June 25, 1987

The Simeon Mills Historic District is a group of seven historic commercial buildings two blocks west of the capitol square in Madison, Wisconsin, constructed from around 1845 to 1887. In 1987 the district was added to the National Register of Historic Places - considered significant for its concentration of 19th century commercial buildings, which is unique in Madison.

== History ==
The city of Madison began in 1836 when the territorial legislature chose it as the territorial capital. Work soon began on the capitol building, and Eben and Rosaline Peck built a log inn to house new arrivals, just a block north of what is now the Mills Historic District. They were the first permanent settlers in Madison.

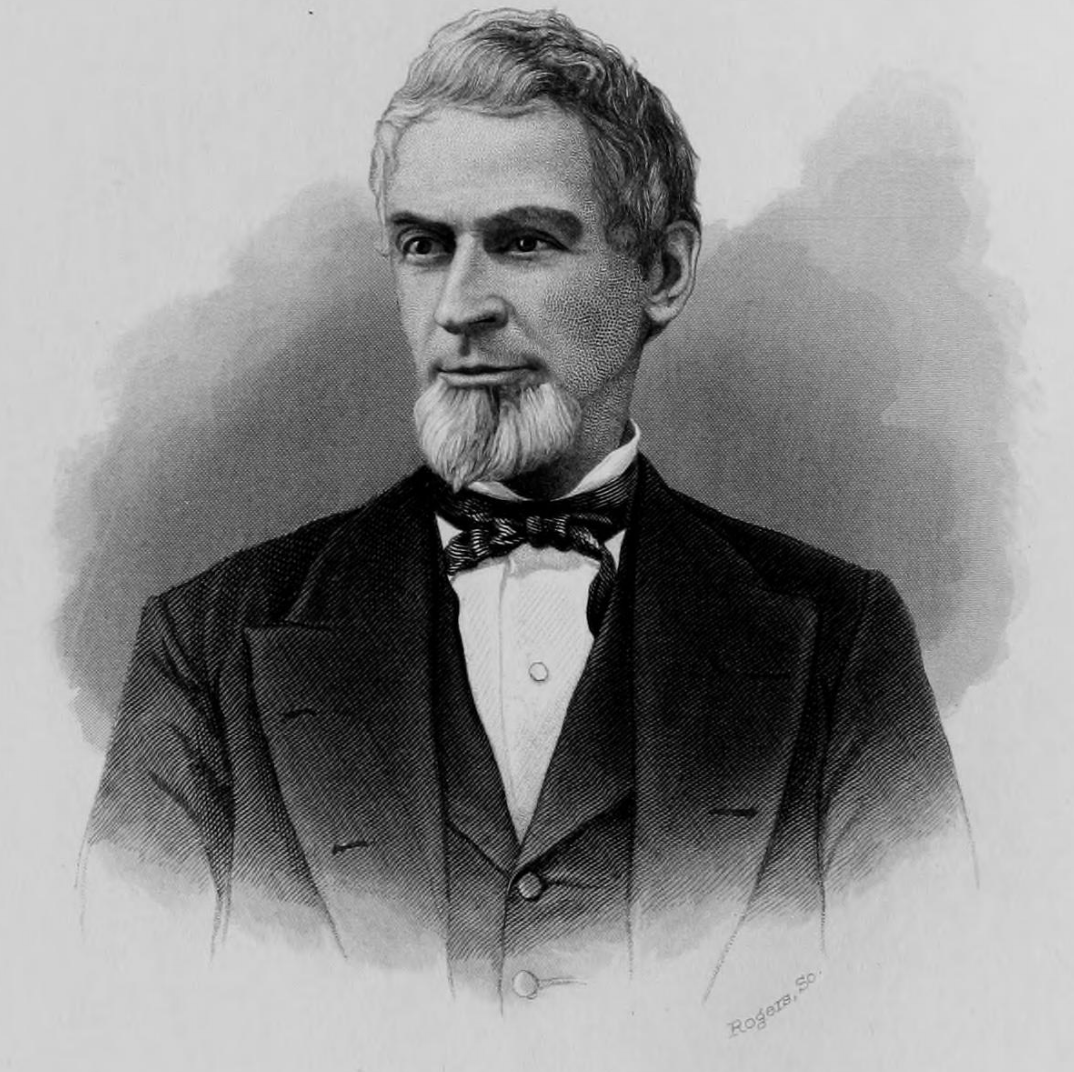
Simeon Mills

In June 1837, Ohio native Simeon Mills walked up from Chicago. Seeing promise in the busy new clearing between lakes and forests, he hired someone to build him a log store and saloon south of the Pecks' inn, at what would become 121-123 E. Main Street, where the Argus-Heilman building now stands. This was the first store in Madison, and perhaps the first store between Milwaukee and Dodgeville. Mills acquired the contract to run Madison's first post office from that store, and carried Madison's mail to and from Milwaukee once a week.

By the following year, the town had grown to 24 buildings, on a "stump-strewn hillside centered along King Street." The buildings included two stores, two saloons, three hotels, and the under-construction Capitol. King Street places the modern historic district squarely in that early business district.

In 1846 when Madison incorporated as a village, the town was still clustered around King Street (still full of stumps), but it was expanding to East Main Street and South Pinckney. Mills helped start a pioneer newspaper the Wisconsin Argus, and around 1847 he and associates built a brick structure on the same block with his log store, with the Argus office on the first floor and halls for a Masonic lodge and an Odd Fellows lodge on the second floor. Though remodeled in 1892, this is the oldest surviving building in Madison.

The business district continued to grow in fits and spurts through economic downturns and the Civil War. Simeon Mills built more commercial buildings in what would become the district, as did others. Mills was a respected civil servant, serving as Clerk of the territorial supreme court, treasurer of Wisconsin Territory, a member of the Wisconsin State Senate, and Wisconsin's paymaster during the Civil War. He was also a key figure in establishing what would become the University of Wisconsin–Madison.

By the 1960s and 1970s the block that would become the Mills district had a shady reputation. Since then, some of the old Mills block has been rehabilitated. A larger area containing the Simeon Mills district was determined to be eligible for the National Register of Historic Places in the 1980s, but some of the owners opposed the listing. The owners of the Mills block itself were more agreeable and the district was listed on the NRHP in 1987 and on the State Register of Historic Places in 1989.

These are the seven surviving historic buildings in the district, in roughly the order built:

- The Argus-Heilmann building at 121-123 E. Main Street was built around 1847 by E.G. Dean to house offices of the Wisconsin Argus newspaper. The paper was on the first floor and halls for Masons and Odd Fellows were above. Starting in 1873, George Heilmann ran the Madison Steam Bakery out of this building, and operated a saloon, a restaurant, and a candy store. Around 1891 the Heilmanns remodeled the façade of the building to the then-fashionable Romanesque Revival style, which is basically the front you see now. The frame behind that façade is probably the oldest surviving building in Madison.
- The Mills and Catlin block at 106-108 King Street was built in 1852 by Simeon Mills and John Catlin. It is a commercial building clad in golden sandstone, with fairly simple window hoods at the second story. Initially the building housed shops at street level and a theater called "Badger Hall" on the third floor. John Wright ran a drug store at 106. R.K. Findlay ran a grocery store at 108, followed by J.H. Hill, then Andrew Mayers, who continued the grocery until 1937. The early Capital Times operated out of the basement of 108 from 1917 to 1927.
- The Mills block at 114-116 King Street was built in 1855, clad in golden sandstone and styled to match 106-108 above. Cantwell Printing operated out of the upper floors of 114 starting in 1867. Charles Hoebel ran a saddle and harness business out of 116 starting in 1885.
- The John Catlin store at 115 E. Main Street, built in 1867, is another golden sandstone building, two stories tall, with rather simple window treatments.

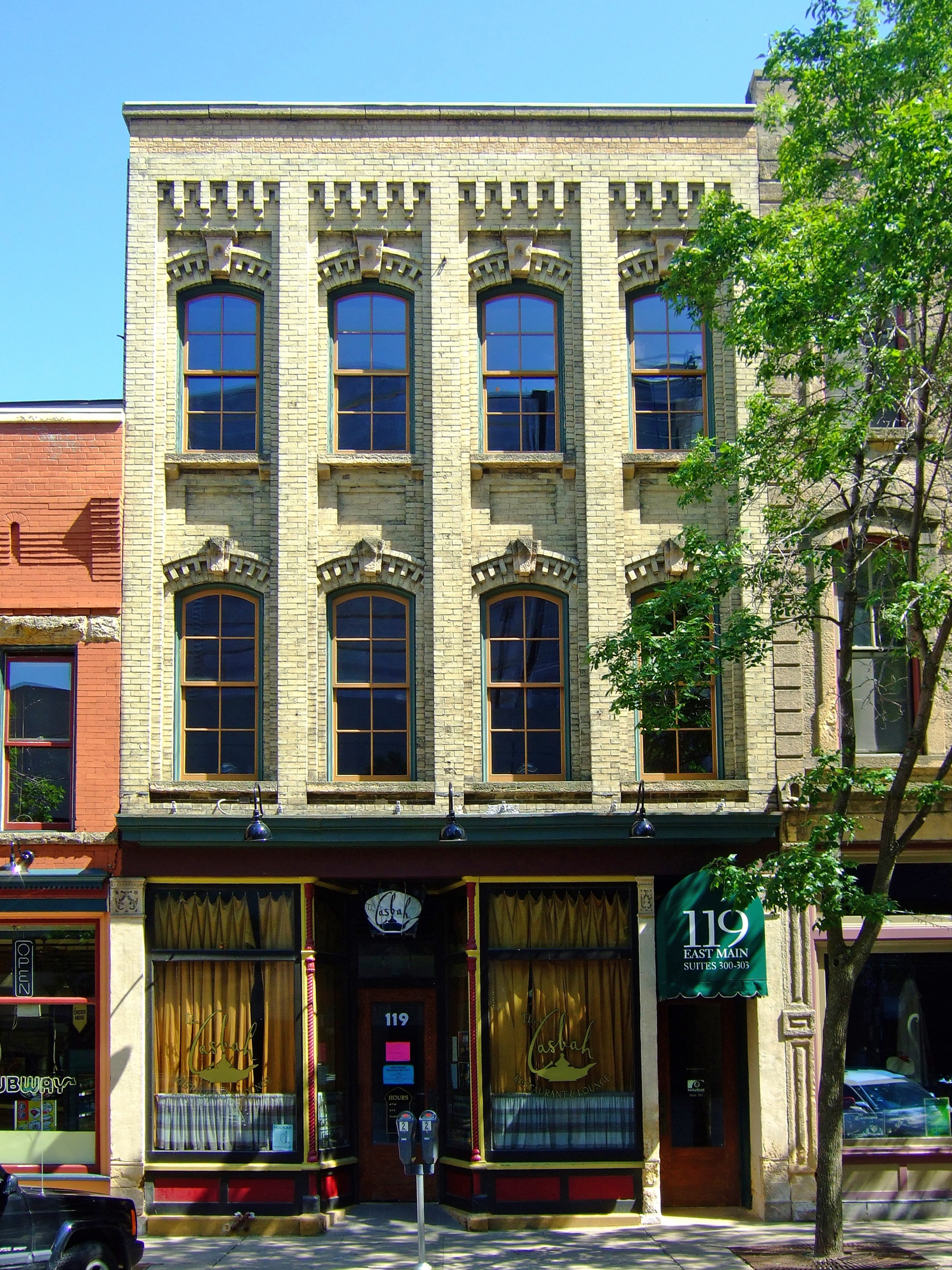
Thompson's Block, Italianate, 1868

- Thompson's Block at 119 E. Main Street is a 3-story cream brick building with fancy Italianate style brickwork, built in 1868. It initially housed Ole Thompson's grocery store, and continued that role under various owners until the 1930s. The store under Thompson was described around 1900 as "packed from cellar to roof with staple and fancy groceries and everything useful to good living," and was known as a good place to buy fish. It was separately listed on the NRHP in 1984.
- The Philip Schoen building at 117 E. Main Street is a 3-story building designed by David R. Jones in Italianate style and built of local sandstone in 1875. It was originally topped with a cornice which has been removed. The building housed Philip Schoen's Capitol Bakery. Before that, Schoen ran a wooden bakery building on this site from 1864 to 1875. In the 1880s the Staats-Zeitung German newspaper was housed in the building. Around 1885 Schoen transitioned the building over to a saloon-restaurant, which continued until Prohibition, when it became a cafe-restaurant.
- The Suhr Bank building at 102-104 King Street was designed by John Nader and built in 1887. It has a triangular footprint to match the lot it sits on, and stands 3 stories. The walls are clad in local sandstone, which was chosen to blend with the older sandstone buildings around it. Nader also mimicked the styling of the nearby Mills block. John J. Suhr founded this bank in 1871 as the Deutsches Bank, to serve local Germans - then Madison's most populous ethnicity. In 1885 the bank was incorporated and the name changed to German-American Bank. During WWI the name was changed to American Exchange Bank. In 1922, Suhr's bank left this location to move to a different 3-story sandstone-clad bank building which still exists, at 1 N. Pinckney Street across the square, which is individually listed on the NRHP.
