= Simeon Mills House =

Historic house in Wisconsin, United States

- U.S. National Register of Historic Places
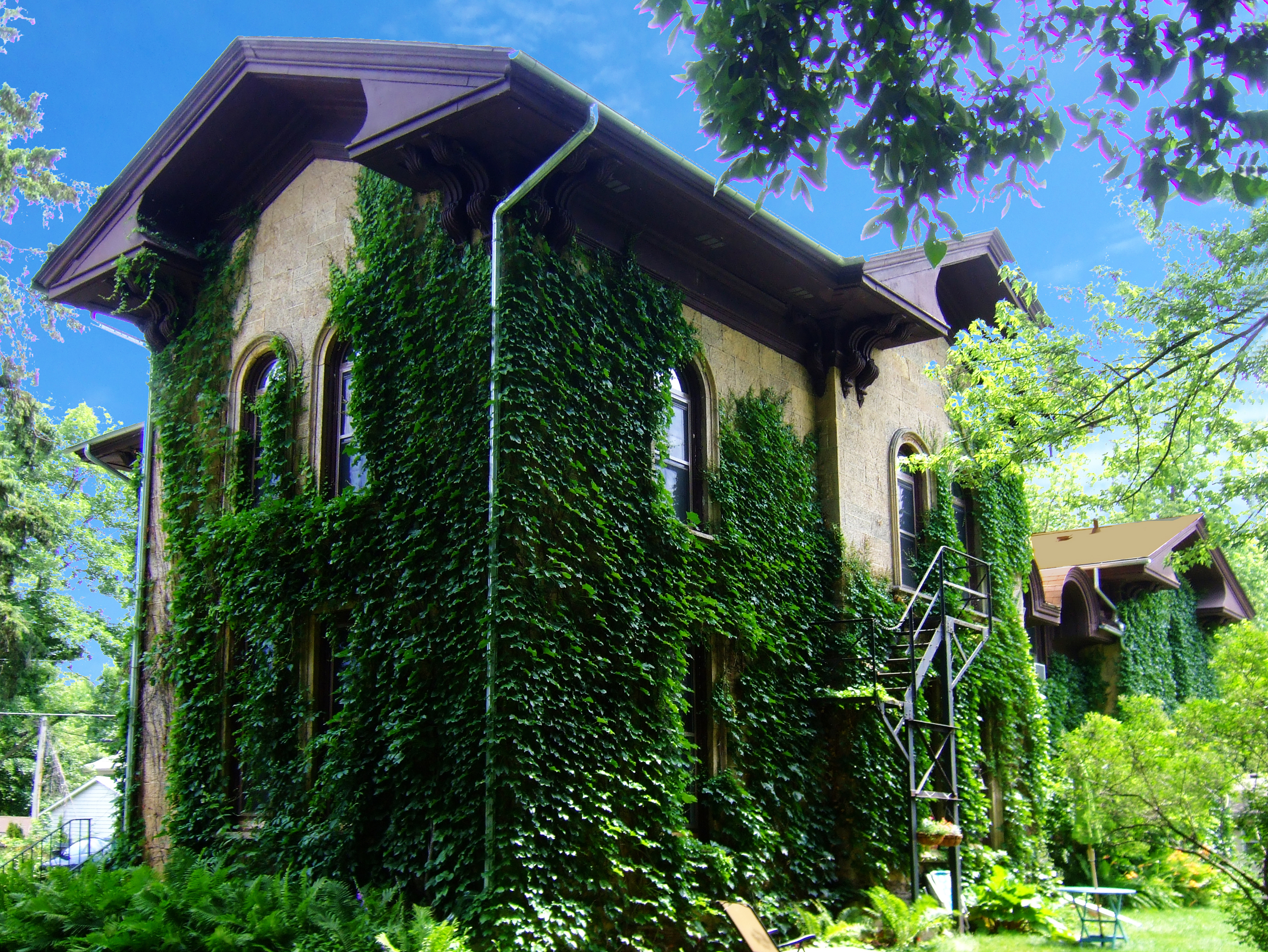
- Simeon Mills House
- Location: 2709 Sommers Ave., Madison, Wisconsin
- Coordinates: 43°05′34″N 89°20′39″W
- Area: less than one acre
- Built: 1863, 1937
- Architectural style: Italianate
- NRHP reference No.: 87001386
- Added to NRHP: August 13, 1987

The Simeon Mills House is an Italianate-style farmhouse-mansion built in 1863 on the east side of Madison, Wisconsin for Mills, an early settler, businessman and prominent civic leader. In 1987 this, his country house, was added to the National Register of Historic Places.

== History ==
Simeon Mills was born in 1810 in Connecticut, and grew up in Ohio. In 1835 the young man came to the frontier that would become Wisconsin and was at Belmont in 1836 for the establishment of Wisconsin Territory. In 1837, he built a log cabin and opened a small grocery store in what would become Madison, years before Madison was incorporated as even a village.

That grocery store was the first of many business ventures for Mills. He was an early speculator in real estate, and successful. He was the first president of the Bank of Madison and of Madison Mutual Insurance Company. He served on the board of Madison Gas, Light & Coke Co. He was a partner in the Argus, Madison's first newspaper. He was president of the Madison and Portage Railroad and director of the Beloit and Madison Railroad.

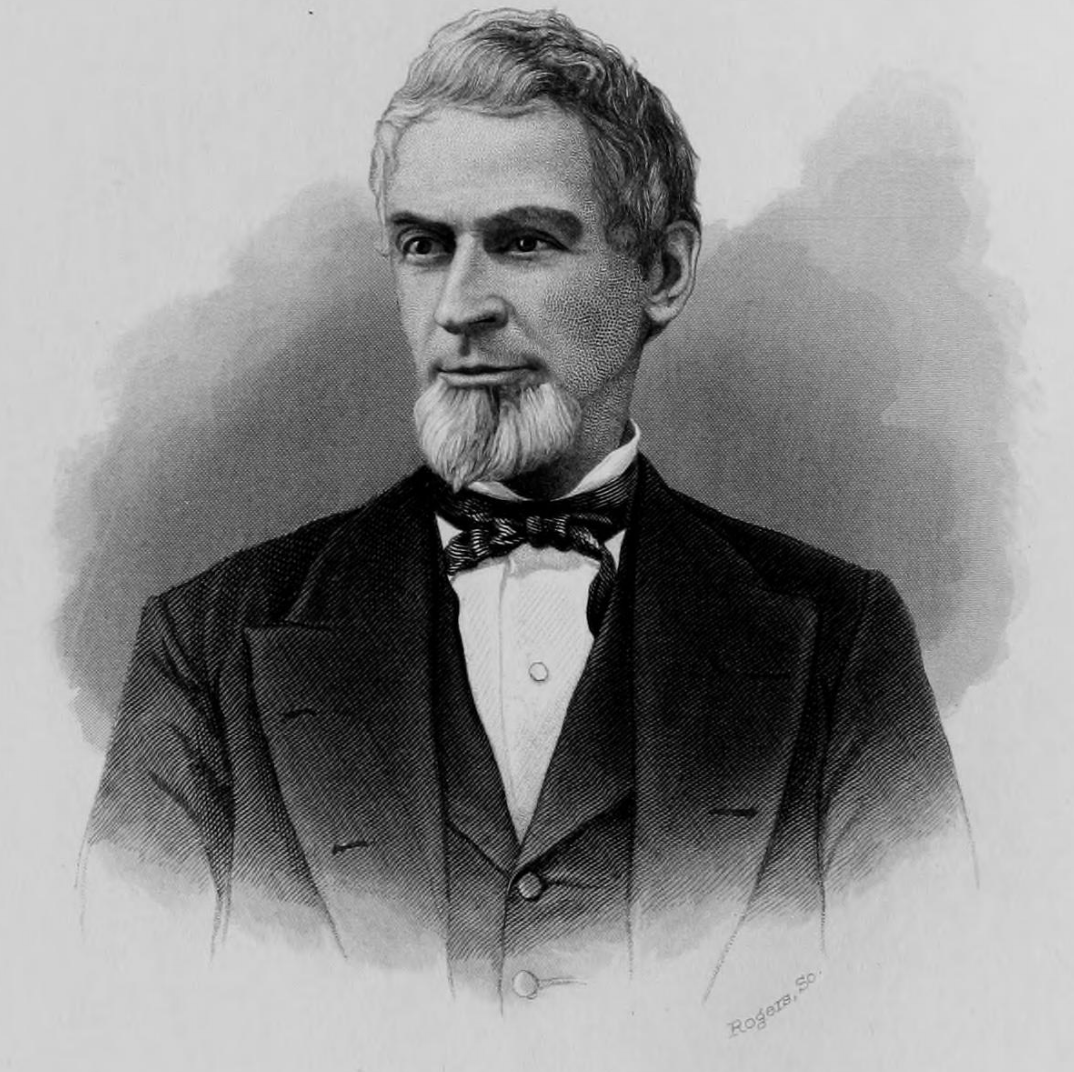
Simeon Mills

Through these years he also served the public in various roles. He was the first mail carrier between Madison and Milwaukee, making that trip twice a week from 1837 to 1842. He was also the first justice of the peace. He served as village trustee, village treasurer, and on Madison's first Board of Education. He was one of Dane County's first county commissioners, and Dane County's first State Senator. In that role, he played a key role in founding the University of Wisconsin, and he served as one of the UW's first regents. During the Civil War, Governor Randall put Mills in charge of recruiting volunteers across Wisconsin for the Union Army.

Mills had four homes around Madison over the years. By 1863, the family was living in a city home at the corner of Main and Monona Ave. Mills also owned 180 acres two miles away on the northeast end of the isthmus. He decided to build a country estate in the then-rural area. The house stands two stories, clad in brown sandstone. The style is Italianate which was fashionable at the time. Hallmarks of the style are the low-pitched roof with wide eaves, the double brackets supporting the eaves, and the protruding mouldings sheltering the windows. First-story windows are rectangular and the second are round-topped. This particular example has eaves that are heavier than most.

Mills called the house Elmside, but local wags dubbed it "Mills Folly," because it was far from his interests downtown. Indeed, the mills family lived there only five years. Later occupants were J.W. Hudson, an industrialist and real estate promoter, and Sam Miller, an opera and theater promoter.

The house was listed on the National Register of Historic Places in 1987 and on the State Register of Historic Places in 1989.
