= Sun Prairie (town), Wisconsin =

Town of Sun Prairie
- Town
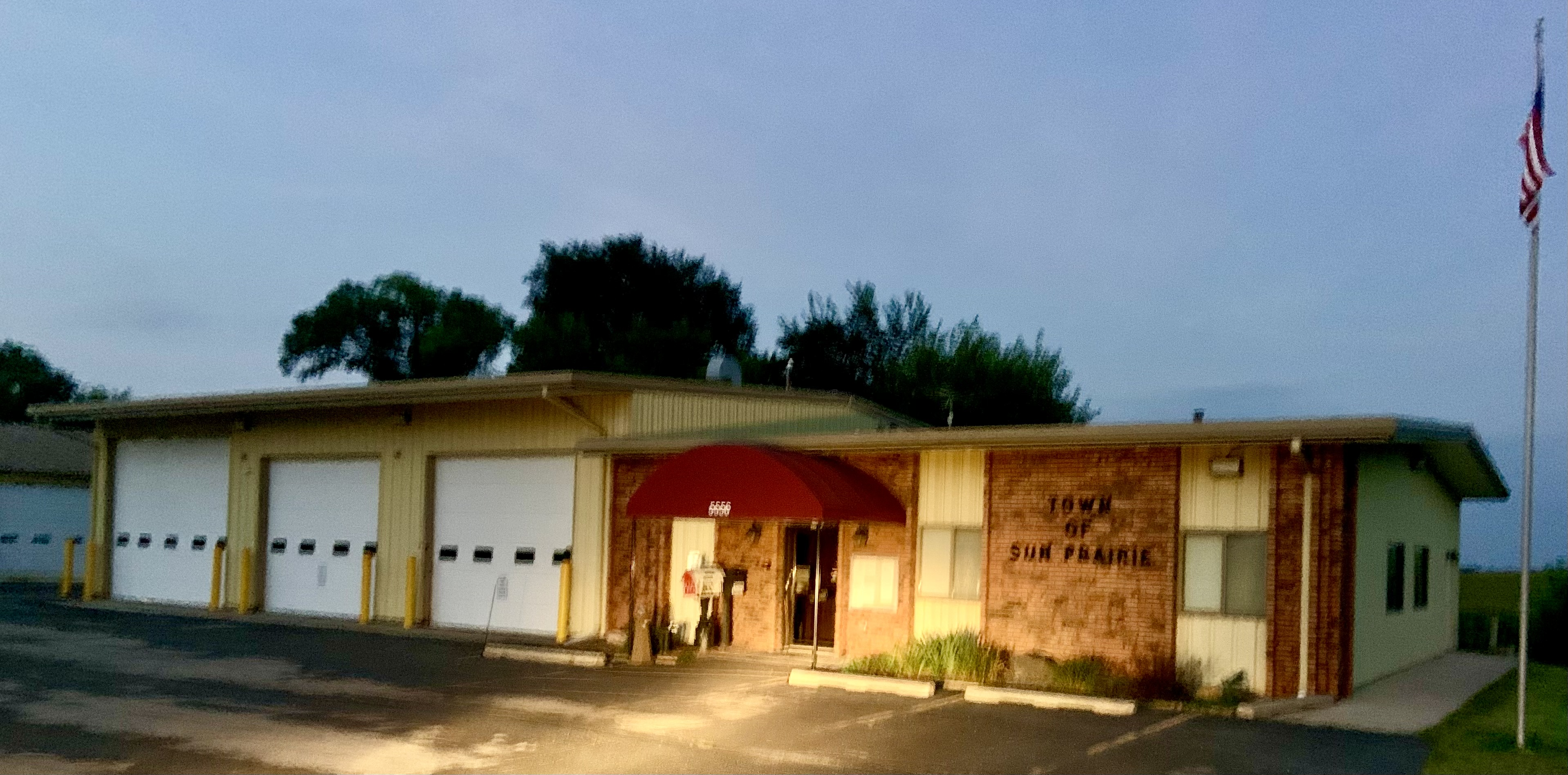
- Town hall

- Location in Dane County and the state of Wisconsin.
- Coordinates: 43°9′16″N 89°11′51″W
- Country: United States
- State: Wisconsin
- County: Dane

Area
  - Total: 31.4 sq mi (81.2 km^{2})
  - Land: 31.4 sq mi (81.2 km^{2})
  - Water: 0 sq mi (0.0 km^{2})
- Elevation: 928 ft (283 m)

Population (2020)
  - Total: 2,391
  - Density: 76.3/sq mi (29.4/km^{2})
- Time zone: UTC-6 (Central (CST))
  - Summer (DST): UTC-5 (CDT)
- Area code: 608
- FIPS code: 55-78625
- GNIS feature ID: 1584256
- Website: https://www.townofsunprairie.wi.gov/

The Town of Sun Prairie is located in Dane County, Wisconsin, United States. The population was 2,391 at the 2020 census. The City of Sun Prairie is located partially within the town. The unincorporated communities of Pierceville and Schey Acres are also located in the town.

== History ==
President Martin Van Buren commissioned a party of 45 men, including Augustus A. Bird, to build a territory capitol in Madison. The group of men left Milwaukee on May 26, 1837, and traveled for days in the rain. On June 9, the group emerged at the edge of the prairie and with the sun shining for the first time in days, carved the words "Sun Prairie" into a tree. Charles Bird returned to the area two years later and became the first settler. The town of Sun Prairie was created on February 2, 1846.

== Geography ==
According to the United States Census Bureau, the town has a total area of 31.4 square miles (81.2 km^{2}), all land.

== Demographics ==
At the 2000 census there were 23,008 people, 806 households, and 653 families in the town. The population density was 73.6 people per square mile (28.4/km^{2}). There were 830 housing units at an average density of 26.5 per square mile (10.2/km^{2}). The racial makeup of the town was 97.36% White, 0.69% Black or African American, 0.56% Native American, 0.22% Asian, 0.22% from other races, and 0.95% from two or more races. 1.60% of the population were Hispanic or Latino of any race. Of the 806 households 38.1% had children under the age of 18 living with them, 72.1% were married couples living together, 4.7% had a female householder with no husband present, and 18.9% were non-families. 12.3% of households were one person and 4.1% were one person aged 65 or older. The average household size was 2.86 and the average family size was 3.11.

The age distribution was 27.5% under the age of 18, 5.9% from 18 to 24, 32.5% from 25 to 44, 26.6% from 45 to 64, and 7.6% 65 or older. The median age was 37 years. For every 100 females, there were 111.5 males. For every 100 females age 18 and over, there were 108.7 males.

The median household income was $60,938 and the median family income was $62,154. Males had a median income of $33,352 versus $27,713 for females. The per capita income for the town was $24,954. About 0.7% of families and 1.5% of the population were below the poverty line, including none of those under age 18 and 3.4% of those age 65 or over.

== Notable people ==
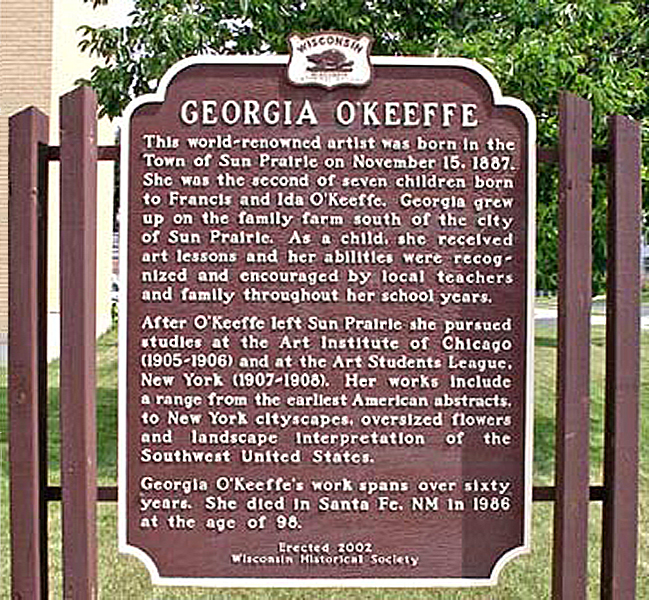
The Town of Sun Prairie is the birthplace of Georgia O'Keeffe.

- Georgia O'Keeffe, artist
