= Truman O. Olson =

American military sergeant

- Born: October 13, 1917; Christiana, Wisconsin, U.S.
- Died: January 31, 1944 (aged 26); Cisterna di Littoria, Italy
- Burial place: West Koshkonong Lutheran Church Cemetery, Stoughton, Wisconsin
- Military career
- Allegiance: United States
- Branch: United States Army
- Service years: 1942–1944
- Rank: Sergeant
- Units: 7th Infantry Regiment, 3rd Infantry Division
- Conflicts: World War II • Battle of Cisterna †
- Awards: Medal of Honor

Truman O. Olson (October 13, 1917 – January 31, 1944) was a United States Army sergeant who was posthumously awarded the United States military's highest decoration, the Medal of Honor, for his actions in World War II.

Olson was born on October 13, 1917, in Christiana, Wisconsin, and enlisted in the army from nearby Cambridge in June 1942.

He was sent to Europe in 1943 and by January 30 of the next year was serving in Italy as a sergeant in Company B of the 7th Infantry Regiment, 3rd Infantry Division.

On that day, near Cisterna di Littoria, he participated in the Battle of Cisterna. After a day of fighting which resulted in heavy casualties, what remained of his company dug in for the night, with Olson and his gun crew manning a light machine gun in defense of their position. During the night, his entire gun crew was killed or wounded and Olson himself was wounded in the arm. Despite this, he remained at his post and manned the gun alone for the rest of the night. At daybreak on January 31, the German forces launched an intense assault on the company's position and Olson was severely wounded. Knowing that his machine gun was Company B's only effective defense, he refused evacuation and continued to fire on the attacking soldiers for an hour and a half until succumbing to his wounds. For these actions, he was awarded the Medal of Honor a year later, on January 24, 1945.

Aged 26 at his death, Olson was buried in West Koshkonong Lutheran Church Cemetery in Stoughton, Wisconsin.

Olson Hall (building 399) on Fort Benning, Georgia is named in his honor.

== Medal of Honor citation ==
Olson's official Medal of Honor citation reads:

For conspicuous gallantry and intrepidity above and beyond the call of duty. Sgt. Olson, a light machine gunner, elected to sacrifice his life to save his company from annihilation. On the night of 30 January 1944, after a 16-hour assault on entrenched enemy positions in the course of which over one-third of Company B became casualties, the survivors dug in behind a horseshoe elevation, placing Sgt. Olson and his crew, with the 1 available machinegun, forward of their lines and in an exposed position to bear the brunt of the expected German counterattack. Although he had been fighting without respite, Sgt. Olson stuck grimly to his post all night while his guncrew was cut down, 1 by 1, by accurate and overwhelming enemy fire. Weary from over 24 hours of continuous battle and suffering from an arm wound, received during the night engagement, Sgt. Olson manned his gun alone, meeting the full force of an all-out enemy assault by approximately 200 men supported by mortar and machinegun fire which the Germans launched at daybreak on the morning of 31 January. After 30 minutes of fighting, Sgt. Olson was mortally wounded, yet, knowing that only his weapons stood between his company and complete destruction, he refused evacuation. For an hour and a half after receiving his second and fatal wound he continued to fire his machinegun, killing at least 20 of the enemy, wounding many more, and forcing the assaulting German elements to withdraw.

== Awards and decorations ==

Badge	Combat Infantryman Badge		
1st row	Medal of Honor		
2nd row	Bronze Star Medal	Purple Heart	Army Good Conduct Medal
3rd row	American Campaign Medal	European–African–Middle Eastern Campaign Medal with Arrowhead Device and 1 Campaign star	World War II Victory Medal

== See also ==
- List of Medal of Honor recipients for World War II
