= Christopher Legreid =

American politician (1857–1944)

Christopher Legreid (January 27, 1857 – April 16, 1944) was a member of the Wisconsin State Assembly.

== Biography ==
Legreid was born on January 27, 1857, in Deerfield, Wisconsin. He later became a blacksmith and manufacturer in Cambridge, Wisconsin. He sold his blacksmith shop to Otto Krull in 1943. Legreid died at his home in 1944.

== Political career ==
Legreid represented the 2nd District of Dane County, Wisconsin in the Assembly during the 1897 session. Other positions he held include member of the Dane County board. He was a Republican.
