= Albion (community), Wisconsin =

Albion, Wisconsin
- Unincorporated community
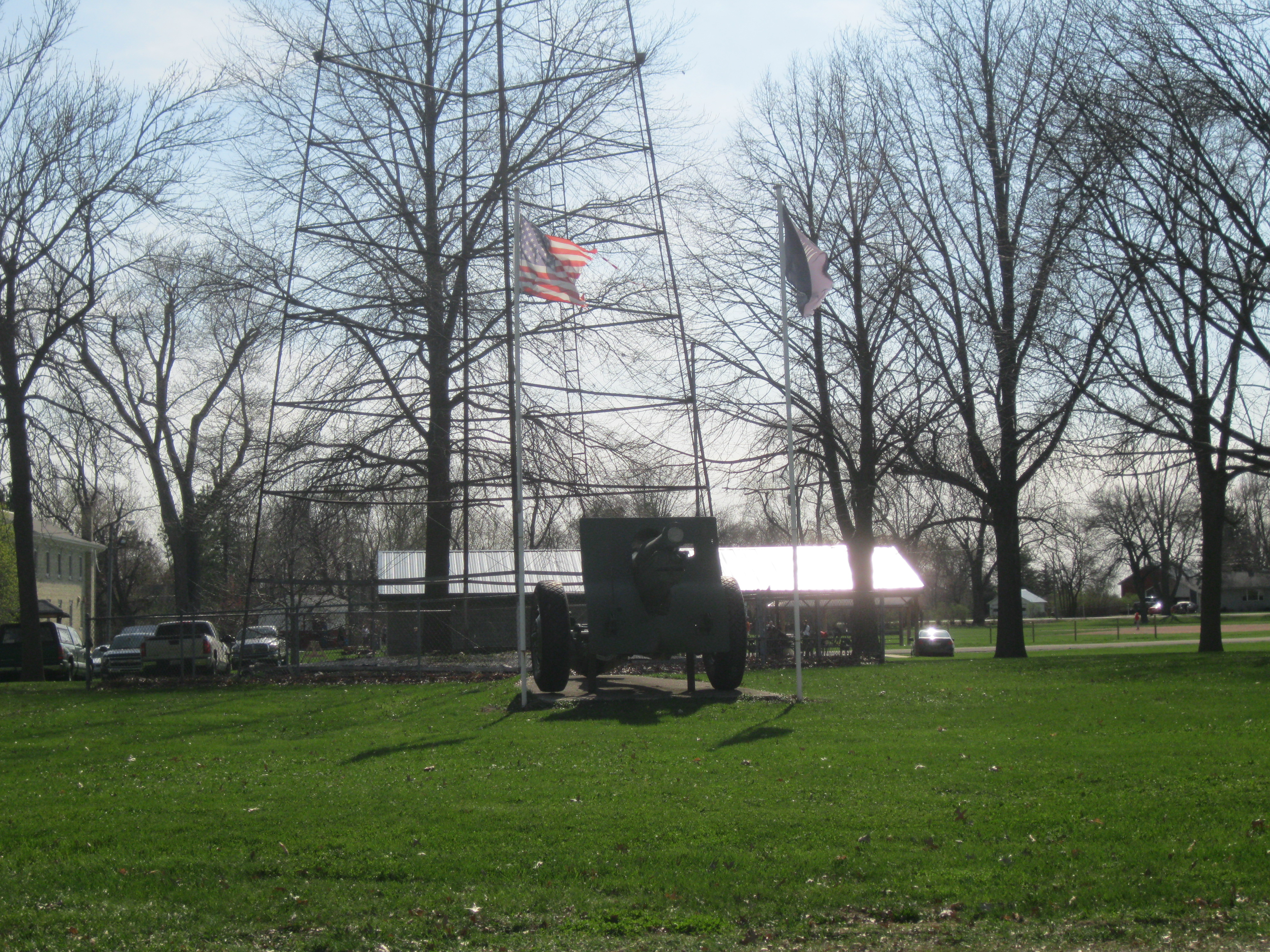
- Public park and war memorial in Albion

- Location within Wisconsin Location within the United States
- Coordinates: 42°52′46″N 89°04′11″W
- Country: United States
- State: Wisconsin
- County: Dane County
- Town: Albion
- Elevation: 840 ft (260 m)
- Time zone: UTC-6 (Central (CST))
  - Summer (DST): UTC-5 (CDT)
- Area code: 608
- GNIS feature ID: 1560730

Albion is an unincorporated community located in the Town of Albion, Dane County, Wisconsin, United States.

== History ==
Isaac Brown, an early resident of Albion, named the community after his hometown of Albion, New York.

Albion is the site of the former Albion Academy. Founded by Seventh Day Baptists, the school was later operated by the Norwegian Evangelical Lutheran Church of America. The school closed in 1918. In 1928, the Town of Albion purchased the buildings. In 1959, the academy property was turned over to the Albion Academy Historical Society, which operates a museum on the site.

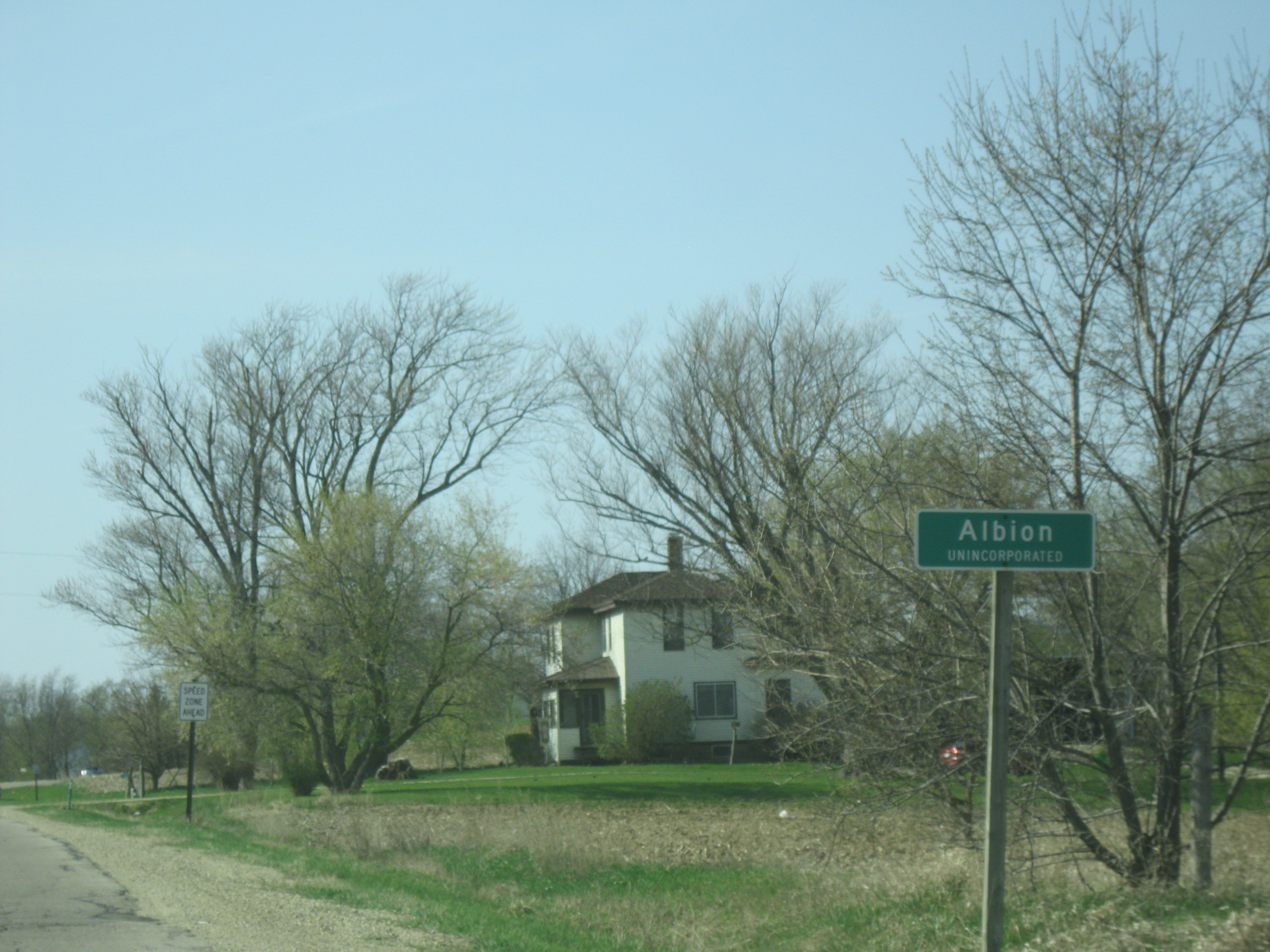
Highway sign for Albion
