= Augustus A. Bird =

19th century American pioneer and politician

2nd Mayor of Madison, Wisconsin
- In office April 1857 – April 1858
- Preceded by: Jairus C. Fairchild
- Succeeded by: George Baldwin Smith

Member of the Wisconsin State Assembly
- In office January 1, 1856 – January 1, 1857
- Preceded by: Levi Baker Vilas
- Succeeded by: Horace A. Tenney
- Constituency: Dane 5th district
- In office January 1, 1851 – January 1, 1852
- Preceded by: Chauncey Abbott
- Succeeded by: Alexander Botkin
- Constituency: Dane 2nd district

Personal details
- Born: Augustus Allen Bird; May 22, 1823 Thetford, Vermont, U.S.
- Died: September 18, 1879 (aged 56) Green Bay, Wisconsin, U.S.
- Resting place: Forest Hill Cemetery, Madison, Wisconsin
- Party: Democratic
- Spouse: Charity LeClair (m. 1824–1870)
- Children: Rhenodyne Augustus Bird^{(b. 1825; died 1877)}; Marian (Starkweather)^{(b. 1830; died 1882)}; Juliette Bird^{(b. 1832; died 1833)}; William Wallace Bird^{(b. 1836; died 1902)}; George Washington Bird^{(b. 1837; died 1912)}
- Parents: Zenas Bird (father); Tabita (Burgoyne) Bird (mother)
- Relatives: Ira W. Bird (brother)
- Occupation: contractor, politician

Augustus Allen Bird (April 1, 1802 – February 25, 1870) was an American pioneer and politician. He was the 2nd Mayor of Madison, Wisconsin, represented the Madison area for two terms in the Wisconsin State Assembly, and was one of the commissioners responsible for establishing the first Capitol building located at Madison, Wisconsin, used by the territorial government and Wisconsin Legislature until 1863.

== Biography ==
Born in Thetford, Vermont, he moved with his family to Madison County, New York, and, in 1824, married Charity LeClair. In 1826, he moved with his family to Ann Arbor, Michigan Territory, but returned to Madison County in 1830.

In 1836, Bird moved to the Wisconsin Territory, settled in Milwaukee, and engaged in a construction business. The Governor of Wisconsin Territory Henry Dodge appointed Bird to a three-man commission to plan the new territorial capitol, and, in June 1837, Bird set out with about forty workmen from Milwaukee to the site of the new capitol in Madison, cutting a road from Milwaukee to Madison in the process.

In 1851 and 1856, Bird served in the Wisconsin State Assembly and, in 1857, was elected the 2nd Mayor of Madison. He died suddenly in Green Bay, Wisconsin, while visiting his daughter Marian and her husband, John Starkweather.

His brother, Ira W. Bird, also served in the Wisconsin State Assembly.
