= Nicholas Anderson (politician) =

American politician

Nicholas Anderson (October 22, 1856 – December 5, 1919) was an American businessman, farmer, and politician.

Born in the town of Albion, Dane County, Wisconsin, Anderson was educated at the Albion Academy. He was a farmer and was involved with the insurance business. He served on the Albion Town Board. In 1899, Anderson served in the Wisconsin State Assembly as a Republican. He then lived in Stoughton, Wisconsin and served on the Stoughton Common Council. He died in Stoughton, Wisconsin.
