= Horace A. Tenney =

19th century American politician and historian

Member of the Wisconsin State Assembly from the Dane 5th district
- In office January 5, 1857 – January 4, 1858
- Preceded by: George P. Thompson
- Succeeded by: Frank Gault

6th Village President of Madison, Wisconsin
- In office April 1853 – April 1854
- Preceded by: Chauncey Abbott
- Succeeded by: Simeon Mills

Personal details
- Born: February 22, 1820 Grand Isle, Vermont, U.S.
- Died: March 13, 1906 (aged 86) Madison, Wisconsin, U.S.
- Resting place: Forest Hill Cemetery, Madison, Wisconsin
- Party: Republican
- Spouse: Juliette Pauline Chaney (m. 1843; died 1884)
- Children: Ann Eliza (Jackson)^{(b. 1845; died 1880)}; Charles Kent Tenney^{(b. 1848; died 1910)}; George Augustus Tenney^{(b. 1854; died 1886)}; Horace A. Tenney^{(b. 1857; died 1929)}

Military service
- Allegiance: United States
- Branch/service: United States Volunteers; Union Army
- Rank: Major (Paymaster)
- Battles/wars: American Civil War

Horace Addison Tenney (February 22, 1820 – March 13, 1906) was an American lawyer, newspaper editor, and Republican politician. He served one term in the Wisconsin State Assembly, representing north-central Dane County, and was a regent of the University of Wisconsin.

== Biography ==
Born in Grand Isle, Vermont, Tenney moved with his parents to Elyria, Ohio in 1833. In 1841, Tenney was admitted to the Ohio bar and practiced law. In 1842, he started the Elyria Lorain Republican newspaper. Then, in 1843, Tenney was elected prosecuting attorney of Lorain County, Ohio. Tenney moved to Galena, Illinois in 1845 and started the Galena Jeffersonian newspaper with his brother.

He moved to Madison, Wisconsin Territory, in 1846 and was co-owner of the Wisconsin Argus newspaper. Tenney was the Wisconsin territorial printer in 1846 and 1847, and was the reporter of the two Wisconsin Constitutional Conventions. He was also the Wisconsin assistant state geologist. He served in the Wisconsin State Assembly in 1857 as a Republican. Tenney served as president of the Village of Madison in 1853 and 1854. He was a regent of the University of Wisconsin. During the American Civil War, Tenney was paymaster for the Union Army. He was in charge of the United States Mail for Wisconsin, Iowa, Minnesota, and the Dakota Territory. During the 1870s, he was involved with the editorial staff of some Chicago newspapers. In the United States election of 1878, Tenney ran for the United States House of Representatives in Wisconsin's 2nd congressional district on the Greenback Party ticket. He died in Madison.

== Published works ==
- Tenney, Horace A. (1880). Memorial Record of the Fathers of Wisconsin, Containing Sketches of the Lives and Career of the Members of the Constitutional Conventions of 1846 and 1847–8. D. Atwood.

Wisconsin State Assembly
Preceded by George P. Thompson	Member of the Wisconsin State Assembly from the Dane 5th district January 5, 1857 – January 4, 1858	Succeeded by Frank Gault
Political offices
Preceded by Chauncey Abbott	Village President of Madison, Wisconsin; April 1853 – April 1854	Succeeded by Simeon Mills
