= Albion Academy =

The Albion Academy and Normal School was an academy founded in 1854 by Seventh Day Baptists in the hamlet of Albion in Dane County, Wisconsin. It was later operated by the Norwegian Evangelical Lutheran Church of America. The school closed in 1918. In 1928, the Town of Albion purchased the buildings. In 1959, the academy property was turned over to the Albion Academy Historical Society, which operates a museum devoted to the academy and the early education of southern Wisconsin is now located on the Albion green. Among the treasures at the museum is the canoe paddle created by Sterling North, author of the 1963s bestseller Rascal, for the canoe that North built at his childhood home. The canoe, unfortunately, was destroyed in the 1960s fire of Kumlien Hall. (The last remaining building of the academy, Kumlien Hall, was destroyed by fire in the 1960s, but it was rebuilt.)

It offered a classical education, including courses in the classics, mathematics, science, and music. It is considered one of the first co-educational colleges in Wisconsin.

== Notable faculty members ==
- Thure Kumlien, Swedish-American naturalist
- Rasmus Anderson, Norwegian-American author and diplomat,

== Notable alumni ==
- Alva Adams, governor of Colorado
- Henry Cullen Adams, U.S. Congressman from Wisconsin
- Edward Lee Greene, naturalist
- John Q. Emery, educator
- Henry Huber, 25th Lieutenant Governor of Wisconsin
- Samuel Stephens Miller, Wisconsin pharmacist, lawyer and legislator
- Knute Nelson, U.S. Senator from Minnesota
- Christopher J. Rollis, newspaper editor
- Willis C. Silverthorn, judge and member of both houses of the Wisconsin Legislature
