= Deerfield, Wisconsin =

- Village
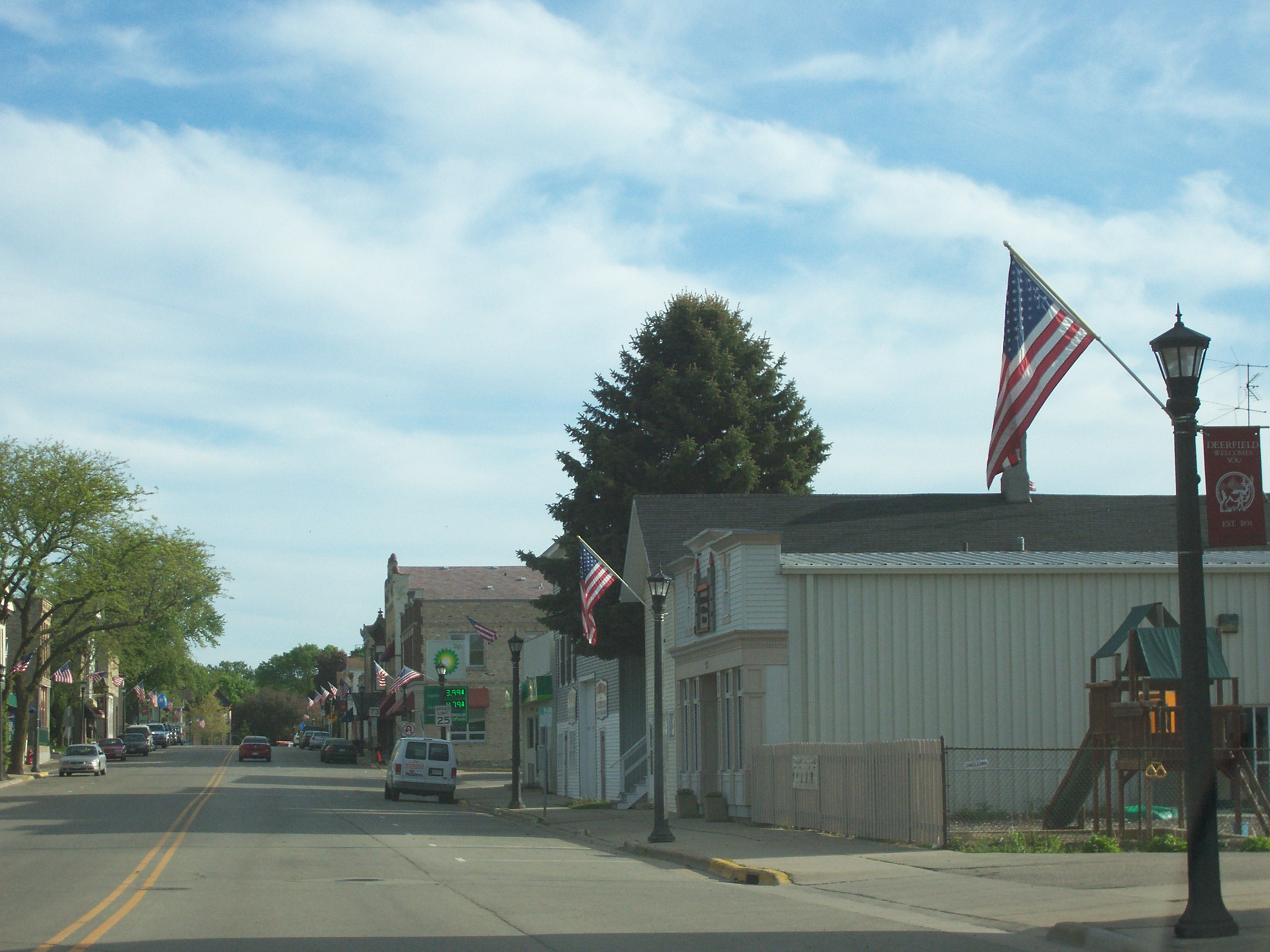
- Downtown Deerfield

- Location of Deerfield in Dane County, Wisconsin.
- Coordinates: 43°3′40″N 89°3′29″W
- Country: United States
- State: Wisconsin
- County: Dane

Government
  - Type: Village Board of Trustees
  - President: Kerri Hewitt

Area
  - Total: 2.17 sq mi (5.61 km^{2})
  - Land: 2.17 sq mi (5.61 km^{2})
  - Water: 0 sq mi (0.00 km^{2})
- Elevation: 945 ft (288 m)

Population (2020)
  - Total: 2,540
  - Density: 1,170/sq mi (453/km^{2})
- Demonym: Deerflridian
- Time zone: UTC-6 (Central (CST))
  - Summer (DST): UTC-5 (CDT)
- Postal code: 53531
- Area code: 608/353
- FIPS code: 55-19275
- GNIS feature ID: 1583060
- Website: deerfieldwi.com

Deerfield is a village in Dane County, Wisconsin, United States. The population was 2,540 at the time of the 2020 census. The village is located within the Town of Deerfield. It is part of the Madison, Wisconsin metropolitan area, and a suburb of Madison. Towns and villages near Deerfield include Stoughton, Madison, Wisconsin, Marshall, Medina, London, Lake Mills, Cambridge, and Cottage Grove, Wisconsin.

== History ==
A post office called Deerfield has been in operation since 1846. The village took its name from the Town of Deerfield.

== Geography ==
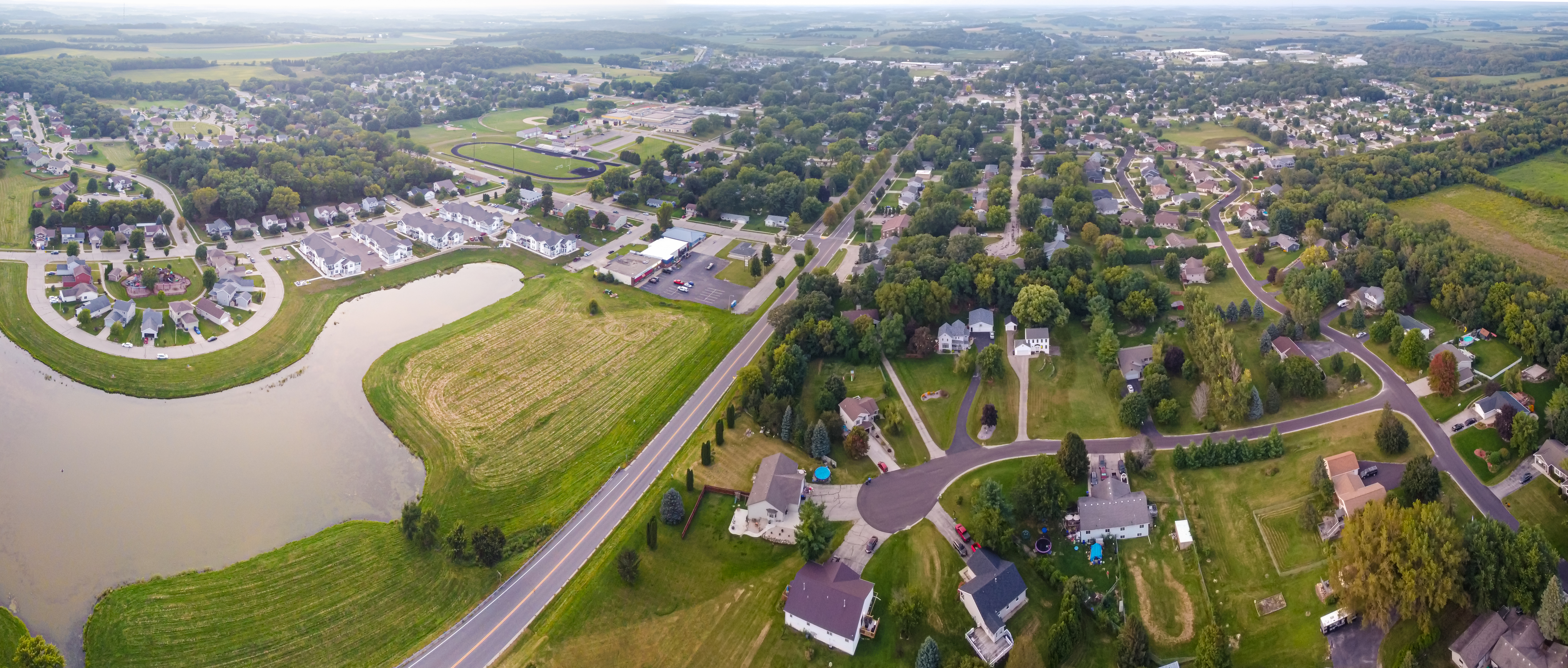

Deerfield is located at 43°3′8″N 89°4′32″W (43.052305, -89.075679).

According to the United States Census Bureau, the village has a total area of 2.22 square miles (5.75 km^{2}), all land.

== Demographics ==
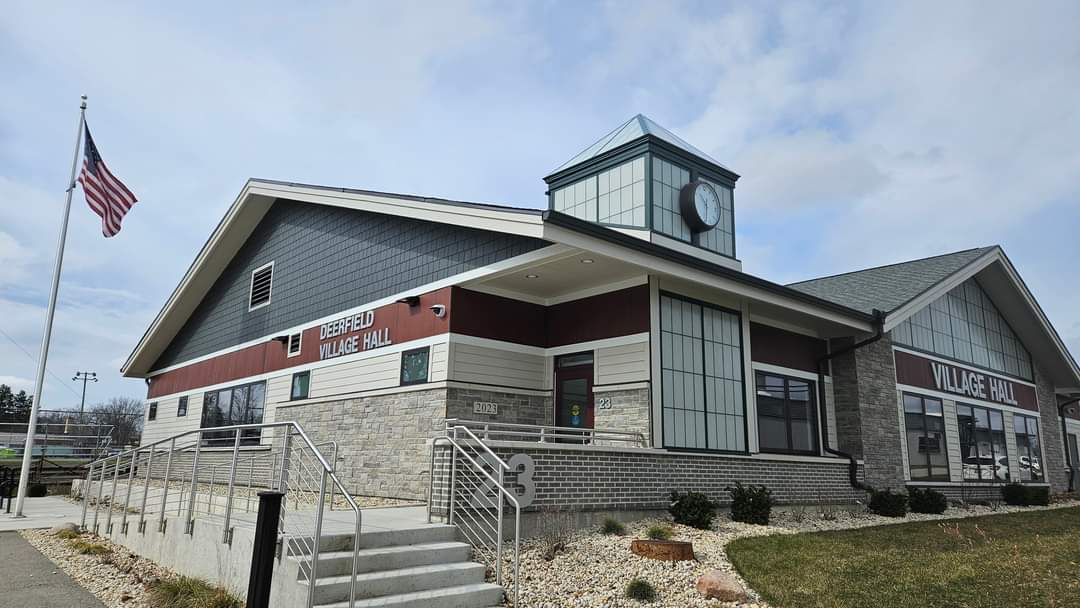
Deerfield Village Hall

Historical population
| Census | Pop. | Note | %± |
|---|---|---|---|
| 1890 | 338 | | — |
| 1900 | 515 | | 52.4% |
| 1910 | 533 | | 3.5% |
| 1920 | 594 | | 11.4% |
| 1930 | 501 | | −15.7% |
| 1940 | 611 | | 22.0% |
| 1950 | 614 | | 0.5% |
| 1960 | 795 | | 29.5% |
| 1970 | 1,067 | | 34.2% |
| 1980 | 1,466 | | 37.4% |
| 1990 | 1,617 | | 10.3% |
| 2000 | 1,971 | | 21.9% |
| 2010 | 2,319 | | 17.7% |
| 2020 | 2,507 | | 8.1% |
U.S. Decennial Census

=== 2010 census ===
As of the census of 2010, there were 2,319 people, 884 households, and 628 families living in the village. The population density was 1,044.6 inhabitants per square mile (403.3/km^{2}). There were 911 housing units at an average density of 410.4 per square mile (158.5/km^{2}). The racial makeup of the village was 95.6% White, 1.0% African American, 0.6% Native American, 0.8% Asian, 0.6% from other races, and 1.3% from two or more races. Hispanic or Latino of any race were 3.3% of the population.

There were 884 households, of which 40.7% had children under the age of 18 living with them, 54.4% were married couples living together, 9.8% had a female householder with no husband present, 6.8% had a male householder with no wife present, and 29.0% were non-families. 23.1% of all households were made up of individuals, and 6.3% had someone living alone who was 65 years of age or older. The average household size was 2.62 and the average family size was 3.06.

The median age in the village was 34.4 years. 27.8% of residents were under the age of 18; 6.2% were between the ages of 18 and 24; 33.1% were from 25 to 44; 25.4% were from 45 to 64; and 7.4% were 65 years of age or older. The gender makeup of the village was 50.7% male and 49.3% female.

=== 2000 census ===
As of the census of 2000, there were 1,971 people, 726 households, and 527 families living in the village. The population density was 1,732.6 people per square mile (667.6/km^{2}). There were 749 housing units at an average density of 658.4 per square mile (253.7/km^{2}). The racial makeup of the village was 94.32% White, 1.62% Black or African American, 0.66% Native American, 1.12% Asian, 1.27% from other races, and 1.01% from two or more races. 2.18% of the population were Hispanic or Latino of any race.

There were 726 households, out of which 40.8% had children under the age of 18 living with them, 59.9% were married couples living together, 8.7% had a female householder with no husband present, and 27.3% were non-families. 21.8% of all households were made up of individuals, and 8.5% had someone living alone who was 65 years of age or older. The average household size was 2.71 and the average family size was 3.17.

In the village, the population was spread out, with 30.8% under the age of 18, 7.6% from 18 to 24, 35.0% from 25 to 44, 17.5% from 45 to 64, and 9.1% who were 65 years of age or older. The median age was 32 years. For every 100 females, there were 101.3 males. For every 100 females age 18 and over, there were 102.2 males.

The median income for a household in the village was $50,439, and the median income for a family was $55,278. Males had a median income of $38,250 versus $27,115 for females. The per capita income for the village was $20,209. About 0.9% of families and 2.4% of the population were below the poverty line, including 1.8% of those under age 18 and 6.0% of those age 65 or over.

== Notable people ==
- Eleanor Fitzgerald — editor and theater professional
- Christopher Legreid — Wisconsin state representative, blacksmith, and barber
- Earl Mullen — Wisconsin state representative and barber
- Frank J. Shakespeare (1925–2022) — diplomat and media executive; resident of Deerfield at the time of his death
