= Chauncey Abbott =

American lawyer and politician

5th Village President of Madison, Wisconsin
- In office 1852–1853
- Preceded by: Simeon Mills
- Succeeded by: Horace A. Tenney

Member of the Wisconsin State Assembly from the Dane 2nd district
- In office January 1, 1850 – January 1, 1851
- Preceded by: Ira W. Bird
- Succeeded by: Augustus A. Bird

Personal details
- Born: September 16, 1815 Cornwall, Vermont, U.S.
- Died: January 30, 1872 (aged 56) Schuyler, Nebraska, U.S.
- Resting place: Forest Hill Cemetery; Madison, Wisconsin
- Party: Whig Party
- Spouses: Jane Strong (m. 1845; died 1852); Anne Damon Maxwell (Wells) (m. 1856; died 1916)
- Children: with Jane Strong: John Strong Abbott (b. 1846; died 1889); Mary Abbott (b. 1848; died 1895); with Anne Maxwell: Chauncy Abbott II (b. 1857; died 1918); Samuel Maxwell Abbott (b. 1859; died 1859); Annie Abbott (b. 1862; died 1862); Maxwell Abbott (b. 1862; died 1862)
- Education: Middlebury College
- Profession: Lawyer, politician

Chauncey Abbott (September 16, 1815 – January 30, 1872) was an American lawyer, Whig politician, and Wisconsin pioneer. He served as the 5th village president of Madison, Wisconsin, and represented central Dane County in the Wisconsin State Assembly during the 3rd Wisconsin Legislature (1850).

== Early life ==
Abbott was born in Cornwall, Vermont. He graduated from Middlebury College in Vermont. He came to the Wisconsin Territory in 1841, he read law and began practicing in Fort Winnebago, before moving to Mineral Point. There he became a law partner with Moses M. Strong. He then settled in Madison, where he formed a law practice with John Catlin, future secretary and acting-governor of the Wisconsin Territory.

== Political career ==
In 1848, Abbott ran as the Whig candidate for Secretary of State of Wisconsin, but lost the election. In 1850, he was the District Attorney of Dane County and served in the Wisconsin State Assembly. In the fall of 1852, he was the Whig Party's candidate for United States Congress in Wisconsin's 2nd congressional district, but was defeated. He was the president of the Dane County Bar Association in 1858.

He was the Postmaster of Madison from 1850 to 1853, and President of Madison (now Mayor) from 1852 to 1853. From 1853 to 1856, he served as a regent for the University of Wisconsin–Madison.

In 1867, he moved back to Vermont. He later moved to Schuyler, Nebraska, and died in Nebraska on January 30, 1872. He is interred in Forest Hill Cemetery in Madison.

== Personal life ==
In September 1845, Chauncey Abbott married Jane Lucy Strong, a younger sister of his law partner Moses M. Strong. They had a son and daughter together, but Jane died in 1852 after only seven years of marriage. Chauncey married for a second time in 1856, to Anne Damon Maxwell, the widow of Nathan Perkins Wells. Together they had four children, though only one, Chauncy II, survived to adulthood. After Abbott's death, his wife, Anne married again, to Morris E. Fuller.
