= Christiana, Dane County, Wisconsin =

Town of Christiana
- Town
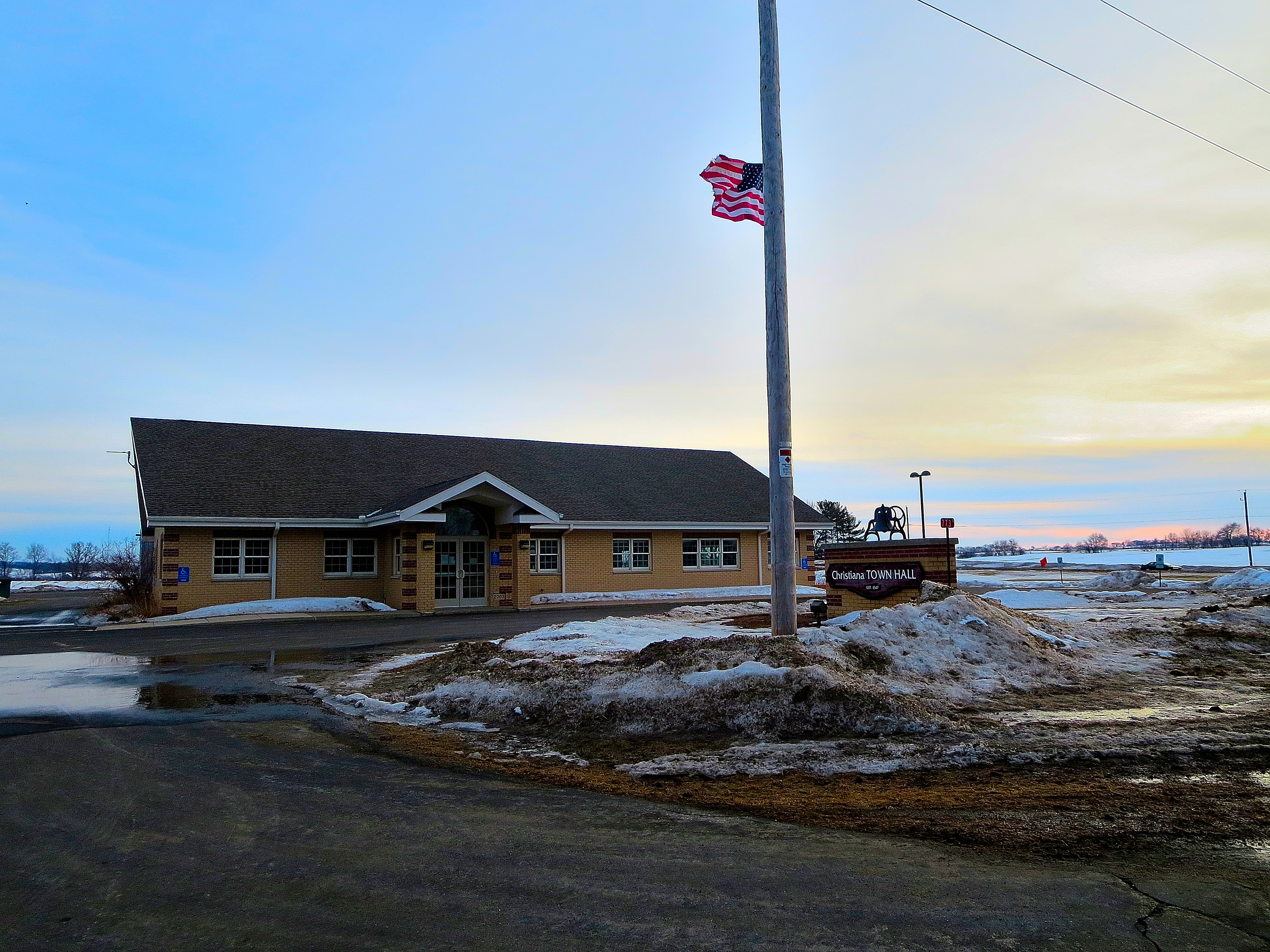
- Town hall

- Location in Dane County and the state of Wisconsin.

- Location within Wisconsin Location within the United States
- Coordinates: 42°59′25″N 89°5′28″W
- Country: United States
- State: Wisconsin
- County: Dane

Area
  - Total: 35.4 sq mi (91.8 km^{2})
  - Land: 35.3 sq mi (91.5 km^{2})
  - Water: 0.15 sq mi (0.4 km^{2})
- Elevation: 912 ft (278 m)

Population (2020)
  - Total: 1,235
  - Density: 35.0/sq mi (13.5/km^{2})
- Time zone: UTC-6 (Central (CST))
  - Summer (DST): UTC-5 (CDT)
- Area code: 608
- FIPS code: 55-14650
- GNIS feature ID: 1582959
- Website: https://tn.christiana.wi.gov/

The Town of Christiana is located in Dane County, Wisconsin, United States. The population was 1,235 at the 2020 census. It is named after Oslo, Norway (formerly Christiania) and has one of the highest percentages of Norwegian ancestry in the United States. The unincorporated community of Utica and the village of Rockdale are located within the town. The village of Cambridge is located partly within the Town.

== History ==
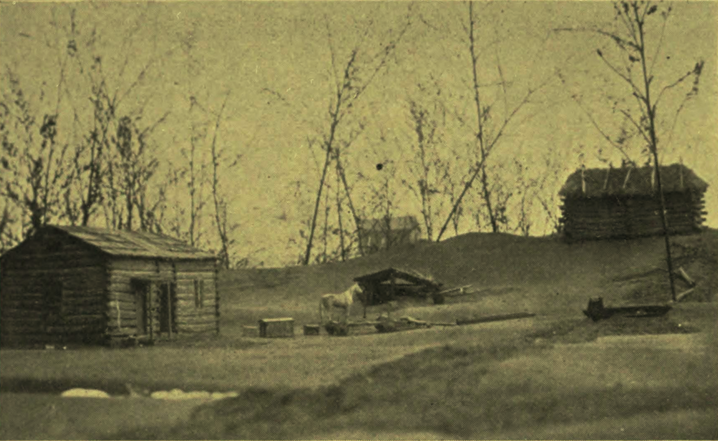
Gunnul Olson Vindeg house was built in Christiana in 1840

The Town of Christiana was created from the Town of Albion and organized on May 6, 1847.

== Geography ==
According to the United States Census Bureau, the town has a total area of 35.5 square miles (91.8 km^{2}), of which 35.3 square miles (91.5 km^{2}) is land and 0.1 square mile (0.4 km^{2}) (0.39%) is water.

== Demographics ==
As of the census of 2000, there were 1,313 people, 468 households, and 356 families residing in the town. The population density was 37.2 people per square mile (14.4/km^{2}). There were 492 housing units at an average density of 13.9 per square mile (5.4/km^{2}). The racial makeup of the town was 96.73% White, 0.15% African American, 0.23% Native American, 1.37% Asian, 0.38% from other races, and 1.14% from two or more races. Hispanic or Latino of any race were 2.28% of the population.

There were 468 households, out of which 37.0% had children under the age of 18 living with them, 65.0% were married couples living together, 6.2% had a female householder with no husband present, and 23.9% were non-families. 16.2% of all households were made up of individuals, and 8.1% had someone living alone who was 65 years of age or older. The average household size was 2.81 and the average family size was 3.17.

In the town, the population was spread out, with 27.2% under the age of 18, 8.1% from 18 to 24, 28.4% from 25 to 44, 25.6% from 45 to 64, and 10.7% who were 65 years of age or older. The median age was 38 years. For every 100 females, there were 115 males. For every 100 females age 18 and over, there were 107 males.

The median income for a household in the town was $56,042, and the median income for a family was $60,673. Males had a median income of $34,821 versus $27,875 for females. The per capita income for the town was $20,504. About 6.8% of families and 9.2% of the population were below the poverty line, including 13.0% of those under age 18 and 9.8% of those age 65 or over.

== Notable people ==
- George T. Flom, linguist, Old Norse scholar, Univ. of Illinois professor
- James C. Hanson, Wisconsin State Representative
- Truman O. Olson, recipient of Medal of Honor, World War II, United States Army
- Otto Onstad, Wisconsin State Representative and chairman of the Christiana Town Board
- Herman J. Severson, Wisconsin State Senator and jurist
