= Lars O. Lein =

American farmer and politician

Lars O. Lein (May 17, 1874 – May 5, 1958) was an American farmer and politician.

Born in the Town of Albion, Dane County, Wisconsin, Lein graduated from Albion Academy. He was a farmer and was involved with the creamery, tobacco, and insurance businesses. He lived in Edgerton, Wisconsin. In 1941, Lein served in the Wisconsin State Assembly and was a Progressive. Lein died in Fort Atkinson, Wisconsin.
