= Albion, Dane County, Wisconsin =

Town of Albion
- Town
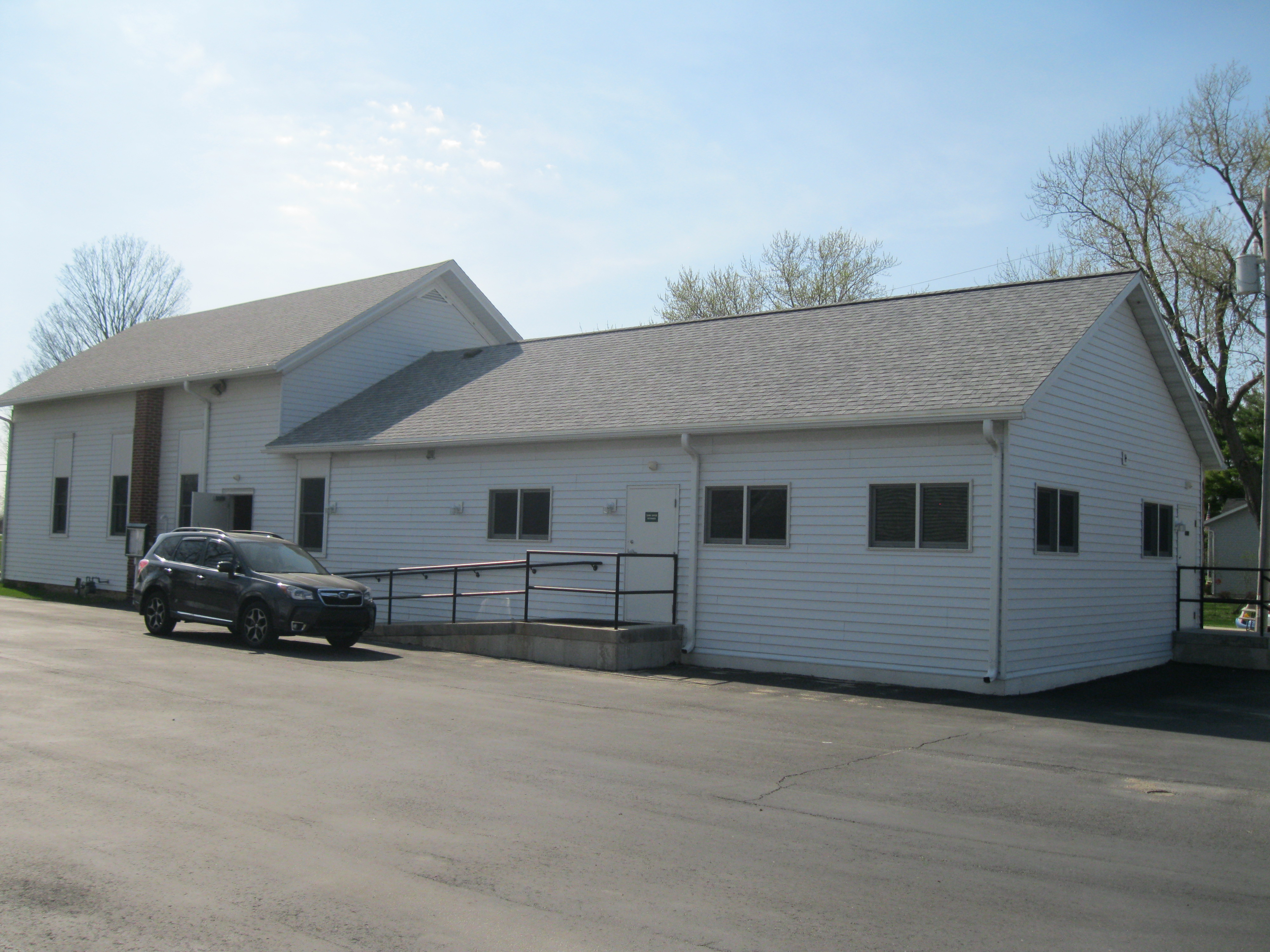
- Albion town hall

- Location in Dane County and the state of Wisconsin.

- Location within Wisconsin Location within the United States
- Coordinates: 42°52′55″N 89°3′31″W
- Country: United States
- State: Wisconsin
- County: Dane

Area
  - Total: 35.8 sq mi (92.7 km^{2})
  - Land: 35.2 sq mi (91.1 km^{2})
  - Water: 0.62 sq mi (1.6 km^{2})
- Elevation: 860 ft (262 m)

Population (2020)
  - Total: 2,069
  - Density: 52/sq mi (20/km^{2})
- Time zone: UTC-6 (Central (CST))
  - Summer (DST): UTC-5 (CDT)
- Area code: 608
- FIPS code: 55-00875
- GNIS feature ID: 1582668
- Website: http://townofalbionwi.com/home

The Town of Albion is located in Dane County, Wisconsin, United States. The population was 2,069 at the 2020 Census. The unincorporated communities of Albion, Highwood, Hillside, and Indian Heights are located in the town.

== History ==
The Town of Christiana was created from the Town of Albion on May 6, 1847. Freeborn Sweet was the first settler of the Town of Albion, migrating from Oneida County, New York in August 1841. Other settlers began arriving that fall. In 1842, the first inhabitants in what would become the hamlet of Albion arrived, and the following year they organized a Seventh Day Baptist Church, which became a prominent institution in the community.

In 1844, settlement began in the northern part of the town, known as "Albion Prairie". A school was organized the same year. A Primitive Methodist Church was soon started, but burned down in the 1860s. A later building, constructed in the early 1870s, still stands near Rice Lake. In 1868, a Methodist Episcopal Church was built near the Primitive Methodist Church, but that building was demolished in the 1930s.

In the 1800s, the hamlet of Albion was a retail center for the area, with a general store, a wagon and blacksmith shop, a steam mill that manufactured wagons and sleighs, a harness shop, and a hotel.

In 1854, Albion Academy was founded by the Seventh Day Baptists in the hamlet of Albion. It offered a classical education, including courses in the classics, mathematics, science, and music. It is considered one of the first co-educational colleges in Wisconsin. Among faculty members at this school were the famed Swedish-American naturalist, Thure Kumlien, and the Norwegian-American author and diplomat, Rasmus Anderson. Graduates of the college included naturalist Edward Lee Greene, educator John Q. Emery, newspaper editor Christopher J. Rollis, Colorado governor Alva Adams, and Minnesota's U.S. Senator Knute Nelson. The last remaining building of the academy, Kumlien Hall, was destroyed by fire in the 1960s. However, it was rebuilt and a museum devoted to the academy and the early education of southern Wisconsin is now located on the Albion green. Among the treasures at the museum is the canoe paddle created by Sterling North, author of the 1963 bestseller Rascal, for the canoe that North built at his childhood home. The canoe, unfortunately, was destroyed in the 1960s fire of Kumlien Hall.

== Geography ==
According to the United States Census Bureau, the town has a total area of 35.8 square miles (92.7 km^{2}), of which 35.2 square miles (91.1 km^{2}) is land and 0.6 square mile (1.6 km^{2}) (1.73%) is water.

== Demographics ==
As of the census of 2000, there were 1,823 people, 726 households, and 516 families residing in the town. The population density was 51.8 people per square mile (20.0/km^{2}). There were 869 housing units at an average density of 24.7 per square mile (9.5/km^{2}). The racial makeup of the town was 98.19% White, 0.16% African American, 0.27% Native American, 0.49% Asian, 0.33% from other races, and 0.55% from two or more races. Hispanic or Latino of any race were 0.77% of the population.

There were 726 households, out of which 32.4% had children under the age of 18 living with them, 59.1% were married couples living together, 7.0% had a female householder with no husband present, and 28.9% were non-families. 22.0% of all households were made up of individuals, and 7.6% had someone living alone who was 65 years of age or older. The average household size was 2.51 and the average family size was 2.96.

In the town, the population was spread out, with 24.6% under the age of 18, 6.6% from 18 to 24, 31.5% from 25 to 44, 25.5% from 45 to 64, and 11.9% who were 65 years of age or older. The median age was 39 years. For every 100 females, there were 102.6 males. For every 100 females age 18 and over, there were 105.2 males.

The median income for a household in the town was $49,118, and the median income for a family was $55,938. Males had a median income of $37,000 versus $25,750 for females. The per capita income for the town was $24,643. About 2.1% of families and 5.0% of the population were below the poverty line, including 7.9% of those under age 18 and 2.6% of those age 65 or over.

== Notable people ==
- Nicholas Anderson, farmer and politician, was born in the town. Anderson graduated from Albion Academy
- Rasmus B. Anderson, historian and diplomat
- Lars O. Lein, farmer and politician, was born in the town. Lein graduated from Albion Academy
- Stanley Slagg, lawyer and politician
- Lawrence C. Whittet, businessman and politician, was born in the town
