= Alden Sprague Sanborn =

19th century American politician, 7th Mayor of Madison, Wisconsin, Dane County Judge

The Honorable Alden S. Sandborn
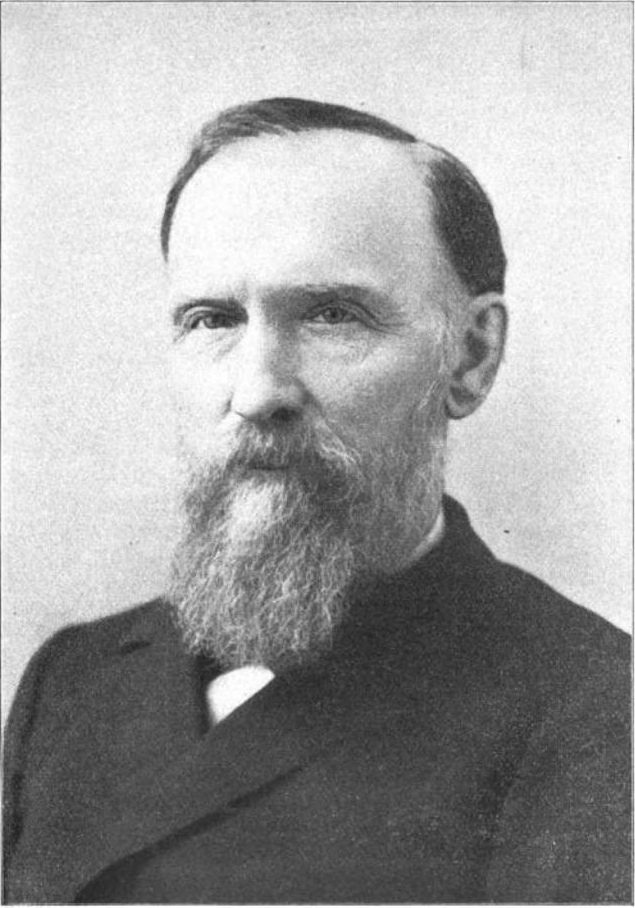

County Judge of Dane County
- In office January 1, 1878 – November 19, 1885
- Preceded by: George E. Bryant
- Succeeded by: Julius H. Carpenter

7th Mayor of Madison, Wisconsin
- In office April 1867 – April 1868
- Preceded by: Elisha W. Keyes
- Succeeded by: David Atwood

Member of the Wisconsin State Assembly
- In office January 1, 1870 – January 1, 1871
- Preceded by: George Baldwin Smith
- Succeeded by: Harlow S. Orton
- Constituency: Dane 5th district
- In office January 1, 1862 – January 1, 1865
- Preceded by: Edward W. Dwight
- Succeeded by: David Ford
- Constituency: Dane 3rd district

District Attorney of Outagamie County
- In office January 1, 1853 – January 1, 1855
- Preceded by: George H. Myers
- Succeeded by: L. B. Noyes

District Attorney of Brown County
- In office January 1, 1851 – January 1, 1853
- Preceded by: David Agry
- Succeeded by: Baron S. Doty

Personal details
- Born: Alden Sprague Sanborn; October 21, 1820 Corinth, Vermont, U.S.
- Died: November 19, 1885 (aged 65) Madison, Wisconsin, U.S.
- Resting place: Forest Hill Cemetery, Madison, Wisconsin
- Party: Democratic
- Spouses: Huldah M. Eastman; (m. 1847)
- Children: Emma Justine (Cook); (b. 1850); Perley Roddis Sanborn; (b. 1853); Ada Blanch; (b. 1856); Prentiss Sanborn; (b. 1861; died 1874); Gertrude Lu; (b. 1864)
- Parents: Amos Sanborn (father); Sophia (Frost) Sanborn (mother)
- Profession: Lawyer, politician

Alden Sprague Sanborn (October 21, 1820 – November 19, 1885) was an American lawyer, politician, and judge. He was the 7th Mayor of Madison, Wisconsin, serving from April 1867 to April 1868, and served as County Judge for Dane County, Wisconsin, from 1878 until his death in 1885. Sanborn also represented Dane County in the Wisconsin State Assembly for four sessions, and served as district attorney in Brown and Outagamie counties.

== Biography ==
Alden Sprague Sanborn was born in Corinth, Vermont, the second child of Amos Sanborn and his second wife, Sophia Frost. Sanborn received a common education until age 16, but did not attend college. He read law with Seth Austin, of Bradford, Vermont, and with Richard P. Marvin, at Jamestown, New York. He was admitted to the Vermont Bar Association in Orange County, Vermont, in January 1846, and moved to the Wisconsin Territory the following September, settling in Milwaukee. He taught school there, and was elected Treasurer of Milwaukee County in 1848.

He moved to Appleton in 1850, which was then part of Brown County, and was elected District Attorney of Brown County in 1850. In 1852, after Outagamie County was created from the southwest corner of Brown County, he was elected District Attorney for the new county, serving another two years. Also during this time, he was chosen by the Wisconsin Legislature as a commissioner to help identify a suitable location for the State Hospital for the Insane.

He relocated to Dane County in the fall of 1854 and resided in Mazomanie, in western Dane County. In Mazomanie, he was elected to three consecutive terms in the Wisconsin State Assembly, serving in the 1862, 1863, and 1864 sessions. In 1864, he moved into the city of Madison, and, after three years practicing law in Madison, he was elected mayor in the April 1867 election, defeating businessman Andrew Proudfit. He was elected to two years as City Attorney, in 1869 and 1870, and, in the November election, was chosen to represent Madison in the Wisconsin State Assembly for the 1870 session. He ran for mayor again in 1872, but was defeated by Republican James L. Hill. Sanborn returned to city government as alderman for Madison's 2nd ward in the 1875 and 1876 city council sessions.

In 1877, Sanborn was elected County Judge in the April election. He was subsequently re-elected in 1881 and 1885, but died before the start of his third term.

== Personal life and family ==
Alden Sprague Sanborn married Huldah M. Eastman, of Haverhill, New Hampshire, in Milwaukee, on February 10, 1847. They had five children, but their fourth child, Prentiss, drowned in Lake Mendota at age 14. His son, Perley Roddis Sanborn, went on to work at the Northwestern Mutual Life Insurance Company for over 25 years, rising to 2nd Vice President of the company, under the mentorship of Henry L. Palmer, who was a friend of Alden Sandborn.

Politically, Sanborn was a Democrat. He was one of the founders of the Knights Templar lodge in Madison, in 1859, was the first Master of the Masonic Lodge there, and was a leading member of the local Masonic Benefit Association.

He was described as studious and methodical in his legal career, disdaining sloth and disorder. As a judge, he was credited as carefully dispatching the interests of the estates that were brought before his court. However, he was regarded as perpetually melancholy, and may have suffered from depression.

== Electoral history ==
=== Madison Mayor (1867) ===
Madison, Wisconsin, Mayoral Election, 1867
Party	Candidate	Votes	%	±%
General Election, April 2, 1867
Democratic	Alden S. Sanborn	856	58.47%	
Democratic	Andrew Proudfit	608	41.53%	
Plurality		248	16.94%	
Total votes		1,464	100.0%	
Democratic gain from Republican				

=== Madison Mayor (1872) ===
Madison, Wisconsin, Mayoral Election, 1872
Party	Candidate	Votes	%	±%
General Election, April 2, 1872
Republican	James L. Hill	976	55.84%	
Democratic	Alden S. Sanborn	772	44.16%	
Plurality		204	11.67%	
Total votes		1,748	100.0%	
Republican gain from Democratic				

=== Dane County Judge (1877) ===
Dane County Judgeship Election, 1877
Party	Candidate	Votes	%	±%
General Election, April 3, 1877
Nonpartisan	Alden S. Sanborn	3,332	42.40%	
Nonpartisan	G. Bjornson	2,492	31.71%	
Nonpartisan	John R. Baltzell	2,035	25.89%	
Plurality		840	10.69%	
Total votes		7,859	100.0%	

Wisconsin State Assembly
Preceded by Edward W. Dwight	Member of the Wisconsin State Assembly from the Dane 3rd district January 1, 1862 – January 1, 1865	Succeeded by David Ford
Preceded by George Baldwin Smith	Member of the Wisconsin State Assembly from the Dane 5th district January 1, 1870 – January 1, 1871	Succeeded by Harlow S. Orton
Political offices
Preceded by Elisha W. Keyes	Mayor of Madison, Wisconsin; 1867 – 1868	Succeeded by David Atwood
Legal offices
Preceded by David Agry	District Attorney of Brown County, Wisconsin; 1851 – 1853	Succeeded by Baron S. Doty
Preceded by George H. Myers	District Attorney of Outagamie County, Wisconsin; 1853 – 1855	Succeeded by L. B. Noyes
Preceded by George E. Bryant	County Judge of Dane County, Wisconsin; 1877 – 1885	Succeeded by J. H. Carpenter
