= Philip Spooner =

Philip Spooner may refer to

- Philip Loring Spooner (1879–1945), American tenor
- Philip L. Spooner Jr. (1847–1918), mayor of Madison, Wisconsin
