= George B. Burrows =

American politician (1832–1909)

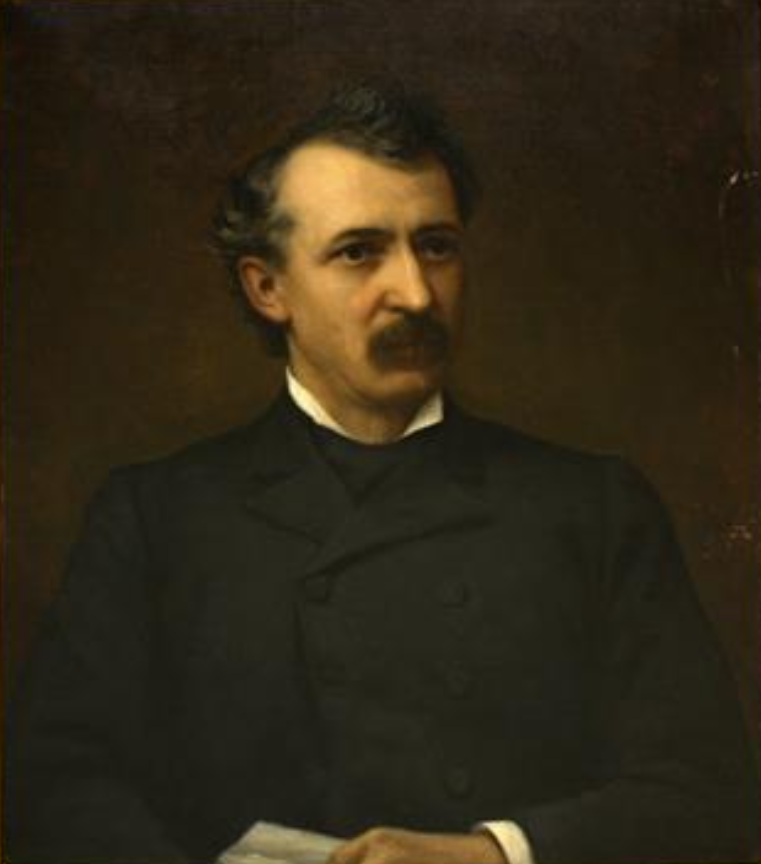
- Portrait of George B. Burrows by James R. Stuart (1887 or before).

38th Speaker of the Wisconsin State Assembly
- In office January 7, 1895 – January 4, 1897
- Preceded by: Edward Keogh
- Succeeded by: George A. Buckstaff

President pro tempore of the Wisconsin Senate
- In office January 2, 1882 – January 1, 1883
- Preceded by: Thomas B. Scott
- Succeeded by: George Washington Ryland

Member of the Wisconsin Senate from the 25th district
- In office January 1, 1877 – January 1, 1883
- Preceded by: Robert L. D. Potter
- Succeeded by: Hans Warner

Member of the Wisconsin State Assembly from the Dane 1st district
- In office January 7, 1895 – January 4, 1897
- Preceded by: Charles W. Heyl
- Succeeded by: Daniel Bechtel

Personal details
- Born: October 20, 1832 Springfield, Vermont, U.S.
- Died: February 25, 1909 (aged 76) Madison, Wisconsin, U.S.
- Resting place: Forest Hill Cemetery, Madison
- Party: Republican
- Spouse: Alma Thompson (m. 1857; died 1883)
- Children: George Thompson Burrows^{(b. 1865; died 1916)}
- Relatives: Daniel Pierce Thompson (father-in-law)

George Baxter Burrows (October 20, 1832 – February 25, 1909) was an American businessman, Republican politician, and Wisconsin pioneer. He was the 38th speaker of the Wisconsin State Assembly, during his sole term in the Assembly (1895–1896). He previously served six years in the Wisconsin Senate, representing Wisconsin's 25th Senate district from 1877 to 1883, and was president pro tempore of the Senate during the 1882 term. He is the namesake of Burrows Park and Burrows Road in Madison, Wisconsin.

== Early life and business career ==
George Burrows was born in Springfield, Vermont, in October 1832. He received a common school education and went to work at a young age. He was employed as a clerk in a series of country stores until 1853, when he moved to New York City and went into business for himself.

He left New York in 1856, moving west and settling in Sauk City, Wisconsin, where he partnered with M. D. Miller in establishing the Sauk City Bank. Miller served as president of the bank Burrows was cashier. The bank lasted for nearly a decade until a change in the banking laws in 1865. That year, Burrows moved to Madison, Wisconsin, where he purchased the Northwestern Land Agency from James Richardson. Burrows vastly expanded the real estate portfolio of the company, dealing real estate in Madison and throughout the northwest quadrant of the state.

== Political career ==
While living in Sauk City, Burrows had become active in the Republican Party of Wisconsin. In 1870, he ran for his first public office, seeking election to the Madison City Council; he lost the general election by 7 votes. In the mid-1870s, Burrows purchased a home located at 406 N. Pinckney Street which had been built in 1858 by Wisconsin Supreme Court justice Orsamus Cole. In 1894, Burrows rebuilt the porches and roof, and he also added the two-story projecting octagonal tower, featuring leaded glass windows and ornately carved limestone columns and quoins. It was topped by a belvedere with a turned spindle rail.

In 1876, Burrows became the Republican nominee for Wisconsin Senate in the 25th Senate district. At the time, the district comprised roughly the eastern half of Dane County and the city of Madison. Burrows prevailed in the general election, defeating Democrat J. J. Naset with 53% of the vote. He was re-elected in 1878 and 1880.

At the start of the 1882 legislative term, Burrows was elected President pro tempore of the Senate. During that term, however, the legislature passed a redistricting act which drew Burrows out of his Senate district. After redistricting, Burrows resided in the 26th Senate district, which comprised all of Dane County. The 26th district was represented by a Democrat but was not up for election again until 1884, meaning Burrows had no seat to run for in 1882. Burrows did make a run for the seat in 1884, but was defeated by Democrat James Conklin, who had recently completed three years as mayor of Madison.

He did not run for elected office again until 1894, when he was elected to the Wisconsin State Assembly from Dane County's 1st Assembly district, which then comprised the city of Madison, the town of Madison, and the town of Blooming Grove. After the election, the Republican caucus elected him speaker of the Assembly. Burrows was hurt by another redistricting act passed during the 1895 legislature, as Dane County lost an Assembly district and his district gained more central-Dane townships. He ran for re-election in 1896 and was defeated by Blooming Grove farmer Daniel Bechtel.

== Later years ==
Burrows died February 25, 1909, at the Madison Sanitarium, where he had been a patient for several months, suffering from Catarrh of the stomach. He was buried at Madison's historic Forest Hill Cemetery.

Burrows bequeathed a large plot of land on the shore of Lake Mendota to the Madison Park and Pleasure Association, which converted the plot into what is now Burrows Park.

== Personal life and family ==
George Burrows was a son of Reverend Baxter Burrows and his wife Lydia (née Boynton). Baxter Burrows was an ordained Baptist minister and a staunch abolitionist who supported the Liberty Party and worked as part of the Underground Railroad. George Burrows' maternal grandfather was John Boynton, a colonel of the Massachusetts militia in the American Revolutionary War. The Boynton family descended from an earlier John Boynton, who emigrated from England to the Massachusetts Bay Colony in 1638.

On January 13, 1857, George Burrows married Alma Thompson, the daughter of Daniel Pierce Thompson. They had only one known child together before her death in 1883. Their son George Thompson Burrows went on to become a lawyer.

== Electoral history ==
=== Wisconsin Senate, 25th district ===
Year	Election	Date	Elected				Defeated				Total	Plurality
1876	General	Nov. 7	George B. Burrows	Republican	3,773	53.28%	J. J. Naset	Dem.	3,305	46.67%	7,081	468
1878	General	Nov. 5	George B. Burrows (inc)	Republican	3,407	54.47%	L. J. Grinde	Dem.	2,367	37.84%	6,255	1,040
1878	General	Nov. 5	George B. Burrows (inc)	Republican	3,407	54.47%	A. E. Adsit	Gbk.	481	7.69%	6,255	1,040
1880	General	Nov. 2	George B. Burrows (inc)	Republican	4,394	58.18%	William Welch	Ind.R.	3,036	40.20%	6,255	1,040
1880	General	Nov. 2	George B. Burrows (inc)	Republican	4,394	58.18%	William Lalor	Gbk.	122	1.62%	6,255	1,040

=== Wisconsin Senate, 26th district ===
Year	Election	Date	Elected				Defeated				Total	Plurality
1884	General	Nov. 4	James Conklin	Democratic	6,543	49.46%	George B. Burrows	Rep.	6,107	46.16%	13,229	436
1884	General	Nov. 4	James Conklin	Democratic	6,543	49.46%	U. P. Stair	Gbk.	579	4.38%	13,229	436

=== Wisconsin Assembly ===
Year	Election	Date	Elected				Defeated				Total	Plurality
1894	General	Nov. 6	George B. Burrows	Republican	1,975	47.84%	Oscar Schlotthauer	Dem.	1,917	46.44%	4,128	58
1894	General	Nov. 6	George B. Burrows	Republican	1,975	47.84%	H. A. Miner	Proh.	135	3.27%	4,128	58
1894	General	Nov. 6	George B. Burrows	Republican	1,975	47.84%	D. W. McDonald	Pop.	101	2.45%	4,128	58
1896	General	Nov. 3	Daniel Bechtel	Democratic	2,831	48.80%	George B. Burrows (inc)	Rep.	2,772	47.78%	5,801	59
1896	General	Nov. 3	Daniel Bechtel	Democratic	2,831	48.80%	Charles F. Cronk	Proh.	198	3.41%	5,801	59

Wisconsin State Assembly
Preceded by Charles W. Heyl	Member of the Wisconsin State Assembly from the Dane 1st district January 7, 1895 – January 4, 1897	Succeeded by Daniel Bechtel
Preceded by Edward Keogh	Speaker of the Wisconsin State Assembly; January 7, 1895 – January 4, 1897	Succeeded by George A. Buckstaff
Wisconsin Senate
Preceded by Robert L. D. Potter	Member of the Wisconsin Senate from the 25th district January 1, 1877 – January 1, 1883	Succeeded by Hans Warner
Preceded by Thomas B. Scott	President pro tempore of the Wisconsin Senate; January 2, 1882 – January 1, 1883	Succeeded by George Washington Ryland
