= Elisha W. Keyes =

American lawyer and politician

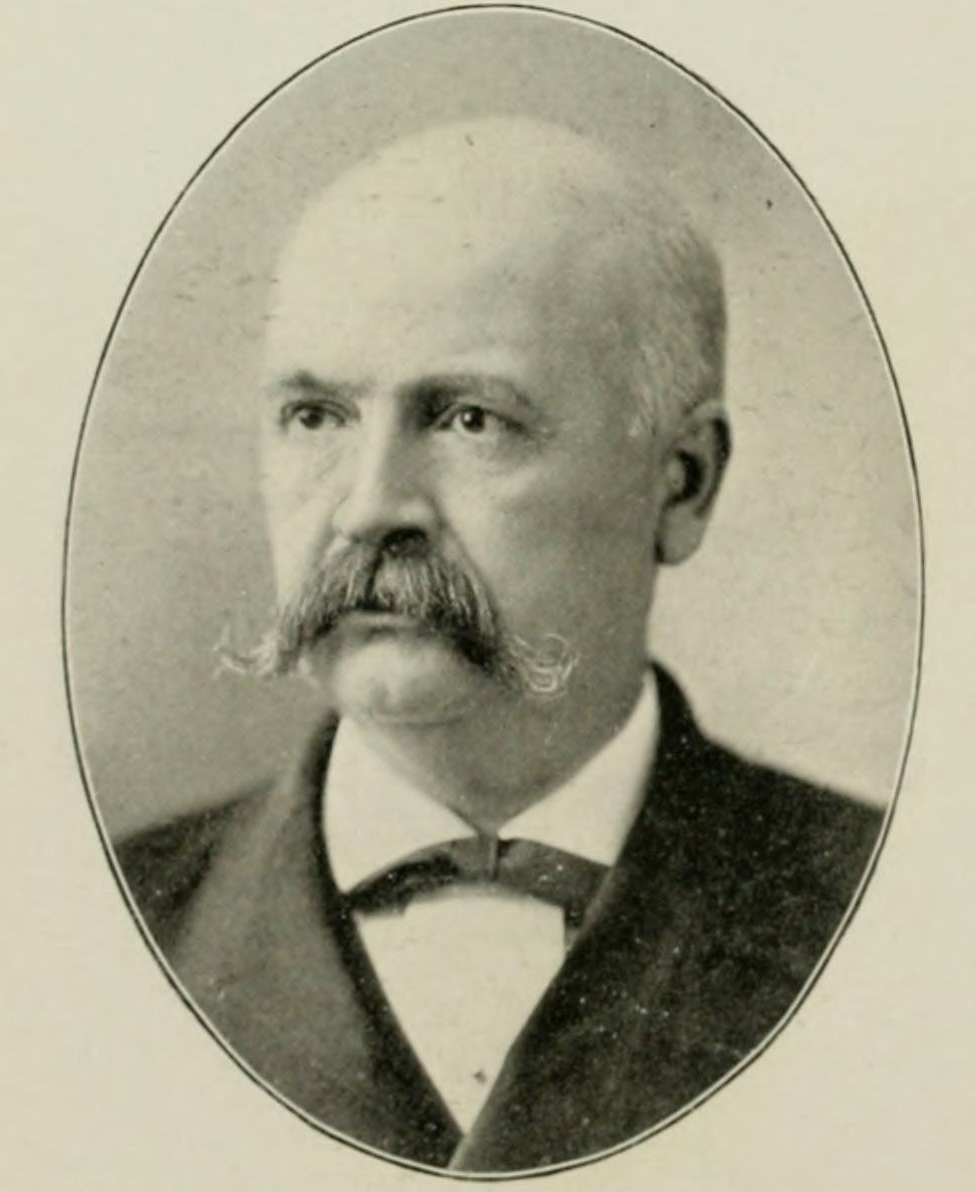
- Elisha W. Keyes, c. 1902

6th and 22nd Mayor of Madison, Wisconsin
- In office April 1886 – April 1887
- Preceded by: Hiram N. Moulton
- Succeeded by: James Conklin
- In office April 1865 – April 1867
- Preceded by: William T. Leitch
- Succeeded by: Alden Sprague Sanborn

Chairman of the Republican Party of Wisconsin
- In office 1869–1877
- Preceded by: Horace Rublee
- Succeeded by: Horace Rublee

Member of the Wisconsin State Assembly from the Dane 2nd district
- In office January 1, 1882 – January 1, 1883
- Preceded by: Louis K. Luse
- Succeeded by: Clement E. Warner

Member of the University of Wisconsin Board of Regents
- In office February 1, 1877 – 1889

District Attorney of Dane County
- In office January 1, 1859 – January 1, 1860
- Preceded by: J. W. Johnson
- Succeeded by: Henry M. Lewis

Personal details
- Born: Elisha William Keyes; January 23, 1828 Northfield, Vermont, U.S.
- Died: November 29, 1910 (aged 82) Madison, Wisconsin, U.S.
- Resting place: Forest Hill Cemetery, Madison, Wisconsin
- Party: Republican
- Parent: Joseph Keyes (father)
- Profession: lawyer, insurance salesman, judge

Elisha William Keyes (/kaɪs/ kies; January 23, 1828 – November 29, 1910) was an American lawyer, politician, postmaster, and local judge. He was the 6th and 22nd Mayor of Madison, Wisconsin, and represented Dane County in the Wisconsin State Assembly. He was Postmaster of Madison from the end of the Civil War until the presidency of Theodore Roosevelt. He is most known for his eight years as Chairman of the Republican Party of Wisconsin and his work building a Republican Party political machine.

With the assistance of former Governor Alexander Randall and others, he helped establish the "Madison Regency," a powerful dispenser of political patronage jobs to the Republican Party faithful. "Boss" Keyes became known as a wily political manager, and saw the state Republican party through its evolution from an abolitionist-driven movement to its consolidation as a dominant and enduring force in Wisconsin. Although he had engineered the campaigns of many candidates, Keyes' own quests for national office were unsuccessful, often running against men he had once worked to elect.

== Early life ==
Keyes was born in Northfield, Vermont, the son of Captain Joseph Keyes, a millwright and inventor. In search of water power to build a mill, Captain Keyes traveled westward to the Milwaukee River valley in 1836 and built a frame house in Milwaukee that winter. His family arrived in June, and Elisha briefly attended a common school in the city. The family traveled westward on foot to Jefferson County, carrying all their provisions with them and nearly starving along the way. His father had staked a claim in Lake Mills where he would later build a sawmill.

Dissatisfied with farm life as a child, Elisha attended several terms at Beloit Seminary, where he formed his political beliefs. The outbreak of the Mexican–American War threatened to spread slavery, causing Keyes to become an abolitionist. In 1849 he decided to become a lawyer, and after another term at the Seminary he spent the summer working in the family's new sawmill in Menasha.

== Opportunities in Madison ==
In December 1850 he moved to Madison and began reading law at the offices of A. L. Collins & George B. Smith. In 1852 he was appointed to his first government position as a special agent of the post office by Postmaster General N. K. Hall under the administration of President Millard Fillmore. For several months he collected money from Wisconsin and Illinois postmasters for deposit in the St. Louis sub-treasury. He also supplemented his income by selling insurance and operating a telegraph. Keyes was admitted to the bar in November 1852. The next year he became a partner at the newly-named law firm of Collins, Smith & Keyes. In two years Collins would depart for a judgeship, and the firm continued growing as Smith & Keyes before dissolving in 1862.

== Early politics ==
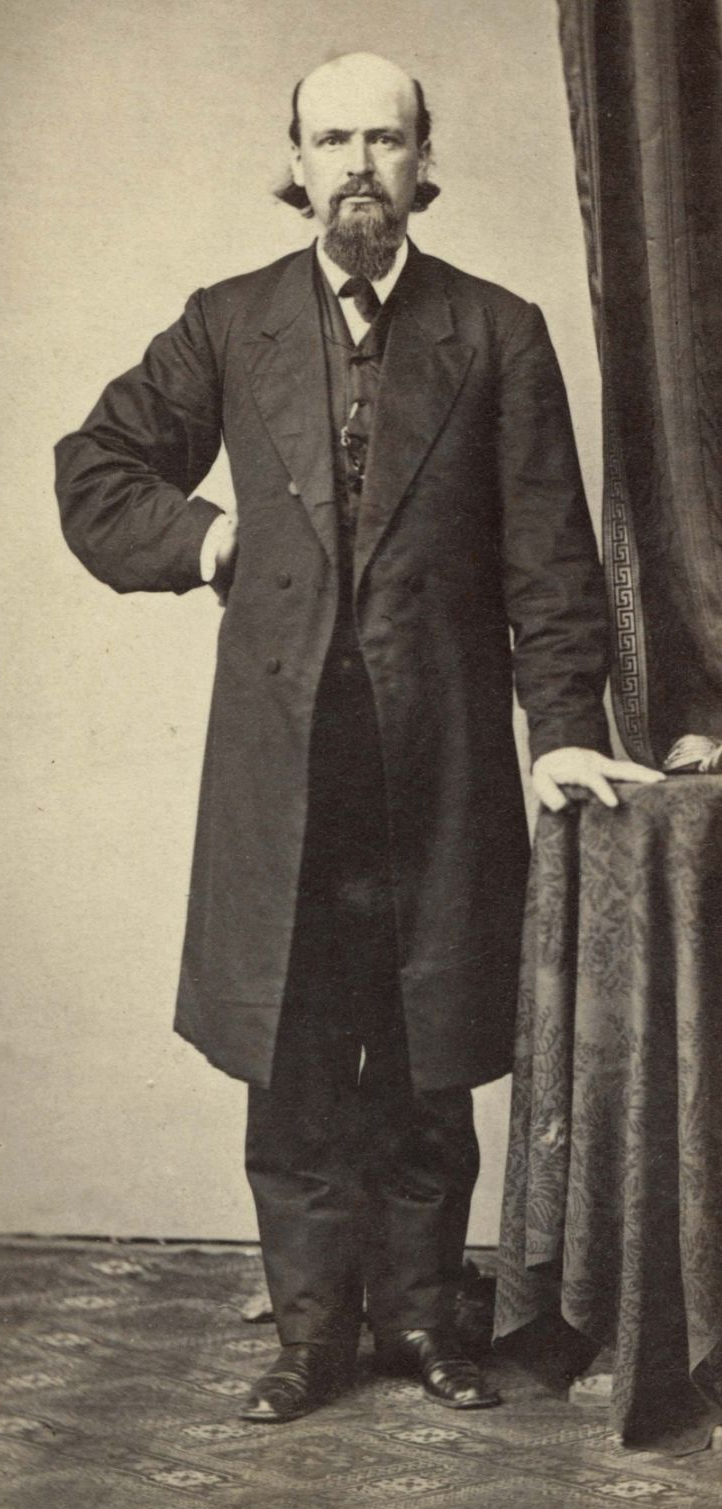
Elisha W. Keyes, c. 1865

Exposed to the heady politics of the state capital, Keyes joined the Whig Party. In 1851 he was a strong campaigner for Leonard J. Farwell for governor. After Farwell's victory Keyes had hoped to be hired as the governor's private secretary, but was not successful. He reasoned that there were many poor "scalawags like myself" seeking a state job.

In October 1852 Keyes ran for Dane County District Attorney despite that he had yet to be admitted to the state bar. Defeated at the Whig convention, he was invited to run for the local state assembly seat, but Keyes declined in the face of stronger Democratic opposition.

== Rising with the Republican Party ==
Following the introduction of the Kansas–Nebraska bill in Congress, citizens of Ripon, Wisconsin, founded the new anti-slavery Republican Party on March 20, 1854. Three months later the state Republican Party was formally organized at a mass convention in Madison.

Though Keyes was involved in the formation of the Dane County Republicans, he also showed support for the anti-immigrant American "Know-Nothing" Party, being vice president of the Madison chapter. Regardless, abolitionist Sherman Booth appointed him to the Republican State Central Committee. He rose through the ranks and formed alliances at party conventions, winning election as the Republican candidate for Dane County District Attorney in 1858.

Like many state Republicans, Keyes supported Sen. William Seward for president at the 1860 convention in Chicago, but transferred support to Abraham Lincoln after his nomination became imminent. Upon his return to Madison, he and another Republican lifted a rail from an old fence to their shoulders and marched to the capitol to demonstrate support for Lincoln "the Rail Splitter."

At the Second Congressional District Republican Convention held that summer in La Crosse, Keyes led a group of young former Whigs of Dane County (including Wisconsin State Journal publishers Horace Rublee and David Atwood) to help secure the nomination of his friend Luther Hanchett for the U.S. Senate, despite Madison Republican Chauncey Abbott having been the presumed favorite.

== Madison postmaster and machine politician ==
For several years it had been Keyes' goal to become Madison's first Republican postmaster. To attain this appointment Keyes and his allies persuaded Governor Alexander Randall not to run for the U.S. Senate in 1861, and to back Keyes' friend Judge Timothy O. Howe for that seat. Following Howe's victory, President Abraham Lincoln appointed Keyes Madison Postmaster, which granted him the power to reward Republican supporters with postal jobs, and punish enemies within the party. A year later Randall was appointed by Lincoln as First Assistant Postmaster General, and with Keyes controlled jobs in more than a thousand post offices in the state.

Derided by Democrats as the "Madison Regency," this relationship had become the dominant political machine in the state by 1864. Its operation can be typified by Randall's support of lumber baron Philetus Sawyer for congress. He designated Keyes as a special agent of the post office, granting him free rail passes to visit all the postmasters in that district to instruct them to work towards Sawyer's election, which resulted in victory. The Republican machine also had its views trumpeted in the Wisconsin State Journal, thanks to editors David Atwood and Horace Rublee, who was also the state party chairman.

== Madison mayor ==
By 1865 Keyes was recognized as a reliable political manager and dubbed the natural choice of the party to run for mayor of Madison. The election happened the day after the Confederate capital was captured, which dampened Democrats' enthusiasm and led to Keyes being elected the first Republican mayor of Madison. His administration presided over a local economy that boomed with the return of soldiers after the war. He pushed for a permanent solution to Madison's muddy streets, and initiated the installation of stone gutters and paved roads. He also encouraged the city's planting of shade trees, and consented to the use of the city treasurer's office as a private library. In 1866 he successfully urged the purchase of the fire department's first steam-powered water pumper.

== From Johnson ally to Radical supporter ==
Following Lincoln's assassination, the succession of vice president Andrew Johnson to the presidency caused a split in the Republican Party, in Wisconsin as well as nationally. Although Johnson appointed Gov. Alexander Randall postmaster general, his veto of Freedmen's Bureau legislation caused a rift among Dane County Republicans. Keyes called a "Union meeting" to discuss the issue, where he announced his support for Johnson and his veto. Other party members saw the veto as a betrayal of Republican values, and pressed for the resignation of Sen. James R. Doolittle, another ally of Johnson.

As Radical Republicans gained the upper hand in Congress, Keyes kept quiet behind the scenes. Randall warned him that "I want to stand fast by you so don't embarrass me or give your enemies a chance to go to the President and have me ordered to hurt [you] without anything from you to sustain me." Keyes was conspicuously absent from Union Republican meetings and conferences, despite being the party chairman for their 2nd congressional district committee. Democrats claimed that Keyes nevertheless shepherded the nomination of Radical Republican Benjamin F. Hopkins for congress. He also raised money for the party by forcing patronage appointees to contribute.

Keyes attended to his duties as mayor and sought re-election in 1866. After the Democrats' favored candidate Simeon Mills declined the nomination, it appeared Keyes would win unopposed. G. W. Heyer, the editor of the Wisconsin Daily Democrat, sought to persuade William H. Noland, a local African-American businessman, to run against Keyes as an independent. Noland declined to be part of what he saw as a Democratic ruse, but his name appeared on the ballot nevertheless. Noland declared he was a "Union man," and cast his vote for Keyes, who was re-elected 961 to 298.

== State party chairman ==
As president of the state's central Grant and Colfax Club in 1868, Keyes campaigned vigorously for Ulysses S. Grant for president. Democrats derided his efforts as an attempt to keep his job as postmaster and maintain the Republican's political machine. The election was a triumph for the party, winning five of the six congressional seats and Grant carrying the state.

A majority in the state legislature also meant that Doolittle's senate seat would go to a Republican in 1869. Keyes passed on candidates Lucius Fairchild, Cadwallader C. Washburn and Rublee to support acclaimed Milwaukee lawyer Matthew H. Carpenter, who was duly elected senator by the legislature. Carpenter and congressman Hopkins helped Keyes' reappointment as postmaster by persuading Grant after the president's first meeting with Keyes did not seem promising.

Grant also appointed Horace Rublee as consul to Switzerland, leaving the chairmanship of the state party vacant. In mocking Rublee's departure, the Madison Democrat suggested Keyes as his "natural successor." He was elected party chairman in the Republican convention that fall. Keyes kept the party in fighting shape by making use of his allies in the railroads and the press. Leading with a sharp tongue, he became known as "Boss" Keyes. He maintained Republican domination of the state, and secured Grant's winning of Wisconsin a second time in 1872.

Despite these successes, other forces were emerging in the state party. Never a wealthy man, Keyes' influence diminished with the rise of Republicans like lumber baron Sawyer and railroad lawyer Angus Cameron, who both would become U.S. senators without his assistance. Following the Panic of 1873, the growth of the reformist Grange movement affected the party in ways that Keyes was reluctant to condemn. The Republicans lost the governorship to Democrat William Taylor.

== Republican maneuvering ==
In order to regain dominance, the party had to ensure Sen. Carpenter's re-election. Despite Republicans winning a majority of the legislature in 1874, a bolt occurred when they voted for senator, resulting in Carpenter losing the seat to Cameron of La Crosse. The episode led some party members such as Sawyer and Washburn to doubt Keyes' effectiveness as party chairman and called for his resignation. He considered it, but after Sen. Howe told him his exit would ensure Republican victories in the fall elections, Keyes decided to fight for his chairmanship at the next party convention. After defending his record with stirring speeches, he was re-elected 172 to 40.

Although never particularly close to Grant, Keyes dutifully rallied state Republicans to vote for the president's choice as his successor, James G. Blaine, at state and national conventions. When Blaine failed to win the nomination, Keyes successfully drove the party machine to give Wisconsin's electoral votes to nominee Rutherford B. Hayes. Ironically, President Hayes' "Order Number 1" would crack down on federal patronage schemes and institute a merit system that would require an exam for a government job, as well as ban mandatory campaign donations from employees. These reforms took away the political tools Keyes needed to exercise power, and he resigned the party chairmanship in 1877. That same year he was appointed to the University of Wisconsin Board of Regents and was chairman of their executive committee.

Nevertheless, Keyes attempted to influence local politics through his position of postmaster. In 1880, he heard Robert La Follette Sr. was attempting to run for Dane County district attorney. Keyes summoned La Follette to inform him he was not the preferred candidate and would be opposed. Despite Keyes supporting his Democratic opponent, La Follette won the election. Keyes would continue to oppose La Follette as he later became congressman, governor and senator.

== Reaching for higher office ==
After his resignation as party chairman, Keyes knew that to maintain his influence he would have to become a candidate for higher office himself. In early 1878 he began to let his interest in Sen. Howe's seat be known. After a Republican state legislature was secured in November, Keyes was seen as the favorite over Howe and former senator Carpenter, as long as congressman Sawyer did not attempt a bolt with the Democrats. However, Keyes no longer controlled the party machine. While he led on the first ballot, it was Carpenter who eventually prevailed in the caucus and won the seat.

Keyes next set his eyes on Sen. Angus Cameron's seat up in 1881, but his plans were foiled when Sawyer entered the contest and was elected in the state legislative caucus. As a consolation the caucus would submit Keyes' name for consideration as President James Garfield's postmaster general. Keyes' allies advised him that Sen. Carpenter was quite ill and would likely not live out his term. After Carpenter died a month later, the Wisconsin State Journal boomed Keyes to fill his seat, but Milwaukee Republicans rejected him in favor of the recently deposed Cameron.

Having no luck in statewide contests, Keyes successfully ran for the state assembly in 1880. His victory raised the state constitutional question of whether a legislator could also serve as postmaster. Keyes had refused to resign from the assembly. Issuing an order banning state officers from federal positions, President Chester A. Arthur declined to reappoint Keyes postmaster. He suffered not only a loss of political influence, but also a loss of income from a job he'd held for nearly twenty years. Nevertheless, he ran for congress the following year, but failed to win the nomination.

== Final years ==
In February 1889, Governor William Hoard appointed Keyes to fill the vacant seat of a municipal judge who had died. In the spring election just weeks later, Keyes was elected to serve out the rest of the term. Three years later he failed to be re-elected, and blamed the allies of La Follette for plotting his defeat. Keyes battled bitterly against the La Follette forces in the state Republican conventions of 1894 and 1896.

Now nearly 70 years old, Keyes was in financial straits. He begged the party's "Old Guard" to persuade President William McKinley to appoint him to his old job as Madison postmaster, which was achieved on the recommendation of Sen. John C. Spooner. As an acknowledgement of Keyes' decades of work for the party, he was able to finish out his years as postmaster, dying on November 29, 1910, at the age of 82.

== Personal life ==
Keyes married his first wife Caroline Stevens in 1854, and she gave birth to their children Joseph, Kate and William. Mrs. Keyes died in 1865. Keyes married his second wife, Mrs. Louisa Sholes, in Dane County on December 4, 1866, and divorced her in 1882, retaining custody of their son Louis. He married his third wife, Eliza Schryver, in Dane County on June 21, 1888.

== Published works ==
- Keyes, Elisha W. (1906). History of Dane County. Madison, Wisconsin: Western Historical Association.

Party political offices
Preceded by Horace Rublee	Chairman of the Republican Party of Wisconsin; 1869–1877	Succeeded by Horace Rublee
Wisconsin State Assembly
Preceded by Louis K. Luse	Member of the Wisconsin State Assembly from the Dane 2nd district January 1, 1882 – January 1, 1883	Succeeded by Clement E. Warner
Political offices
Preceded by William T. Leitch	Mayor of Madison, Wisconsin; April 1865 – April 1867	Succeeded by Alden Sprague Sanborn
Preceded by Hiram N. Moulton	Mayor of Madison, Wisconsin; April 1886 – April 1887	Succeeded by James Conklin
Legal offices
Preceded by J. W. Johnson	District Attorney of Dane County, Wisconsin; January 1, 1859 – January 1, 1860	Succeeded by Henry M. Lewis
