= Daniel Bechtel =

American politician (1840–1907)

Member of the Wisconsin State Assembly from the Dane 1st district
- In office January 4, 1897 – January 2, 1899
- Preceded by: George B. Burrows
- Succeeded by: George E. Bryant

Sheriff of Dane County, Wisconsin
- In office January 1, 1883 – January 1, 1885
- Preceded by: George Weeks
- Succeeded by: William F. Pierstorf

Personal details
- Born: July 31, 1845 Lycoming County, Pennsylvania, U.S.
- Died: August 9, 1907 (aged 62) Blooming Grove, Wisconsin, U.S.
- Resting place: Blooming Grove Cemetery, Madison, Wisconsin
- Party: Democratic
- Occupation: Farmer

Daniel Bechtel (July 31, 1845 – August 9, 1907) was an American farmer, Democratic politician, and Wisconsin pioneer. He served one term in the Wisconsin State Assembly, representing central Dane County during the 1897 term. He earlier served two years as sheriff of Dane County, and served 20 years as town chairman of Blooming Grove, Wisconsin, and ex-officio member of the Dane County board of supervisors.

== Biography ==
Daniel Bechtel was born in Lycoming County, Pennsylvania. As a child, he moved with his parents to Dane County, Wisconsin, in 1850. His father had purchased land in the town of Pleasant Springs, Wisconsin, without having seen the land, and arrived to find it was marsh land unsuitable for farming. After a short time on that land, they sold and moved to farmable land in the town of Blooming Grove, which became the family estate for the rest of Bechtel's life.

Bechtel went to business college in nearby Madison, Wisconsin. He became involved in local politics in Blooming Grove; he was elected town clerk for three years and then town chairman of Blooming Grove from 1874 to 1883. During this era, being elected town chairman also made him ex-officio representative of his town on the Dane County board of supervisors.

In 1882, Bechtel was elected sheriff of Dane County, running on the Democratic Party ticket. He was not a candidate for re-election in 1884, but attended the Democratic state convention that year as a delegate. In the 1885 spring elections, Bechtel returned to his seat as town chairman and member of the county board, which he had previously had to vacate during his term as sheriff. During these years, he was also involved with the fire insurance business, as secretary and later president of the Cottage Grove Fire Insurance Company.

In 1896, Bechtel was the Democratic nominee for Wisconsin State Assembly in Dane County's 1st Assembly district, which then comprised the city of Madison and several neighboring towns in the central part of the county. The incumbent was Republican George B. Burrows, also then-speaker of the Assembly. 1896 was an otherwise good election year for Wisconsin Republicans, but Bechtel scored a surprising upset, defeating the incumbent speaker by a margin of 59 votes. Bechtel served in the 1897–1898 legislative term; he ran for re-election in 1898 but narrowly lost the election, falling just three votes short of Republican George E. Bryant. Bechtel served at least two more terms as town chairman after losing his seat in the Assembly.

== Personal life and family ==
Daniel Bechtel was the second of at least four children born to John and Catherine (née Eyer) Bechtel. Both parents were born in Pennsylvania; John Bechtel operated two mills in Pennsylvania, which he sold to pay for his first property in Wisconsin. The Bechtels were some of the first American settlers in what is now the town of Blooming Grove, Wisconsin. Daniel Bechtel never married.

Bechtel inherited the family farm after his father's death in 1876. He actively managed the farm throughout his life, and was a member of the Dane County Agricultural Association. He died on his family farm in Blooming Grove, Wisconsin, on August 9, 1907, after a brief illness.

== Electoral history ==
Year	Election	Date	Elected				Defeated				Total	Plurality
1896	General	Nov. 3	Daniel Bechtel	Democratic	2,831	48.80%	George B. Burrows (inc)	Rep.	2,772	47.78%	5,801	59
1896	General	Nov. 3	Daniel Bechtel	Democratic	2,831	48.80%	Charles F. Cronk	Proh.	198	3.41%	5,801	59
1898	General	Nov. 8	George E. Bryant	Republican	2,389	50.03%	Daniel Bechtel (inc)	Dem.	2,386	49.97%	4,775	3

Wisconsin State Assembly
Preceded by George B. Burrows	Member of the Wisconsin State Assembly from the Dane 1st district January 4, 1897 – January 2, 1899	Succeeded by George E. Bryant
Legal offices
Preceded by George Weeks	Sheriff of Dane County, Wisconsin; January 1, 1883 – January 1, 1885	Succeeded by William F. Pierstorf
