= James Conklin (politician) =

19th century American politician

Member of the Wisconsin Senate from the 26th district
- In office January 5, 1885 – January 7, 1889
- Preceded by: John Adams
- Succeeded by: Willett Main

19th & 23rd Mayor of Madison, Wisconsin
- In office April 1887 – April 1888
- Preceded by: Elisha W. Keyes
- Succeeded by: Moses Ransom Doyon
- In office April 1881 – April 1884
- Preceded by: Philip L. Spooner Jr.
- Succeeded by: Breese J. Stevens

Personal details
- Born: June 12, 1831 Burlington, Vermont, U.S.
- Died: February 27, 1899 (aged 67) Madison, Wisconsin, U.S.
- Cause of death: Heart disease
- Resting place: Resurrection Cemetery, Madison
- Party: Democratic
- Spouse: Mary Eagan (m. 1853–1899)
- Children: John Conklin^{(b. 1850)}; James Edward Conklin^{(b. 1854; died 1929)}; Mathew Henry Conklin^{(b. 1858; died 1932)}; Marguerite E. Conklin^{(b. 1860; died 1942)}; Catherine S. Conklin^{(b. 1863; died 1887)}; Mary Conklin^{(b. 1864; died 1864)}; Mary B. Conklin^{(b. 1866; died 1927)}; John William Conklin^{(b. 1868; died 1933)}; Lucy A. Conklin^{(b. 1870; died 1891)}
- Occupation: Coal merchant

James Conklin (June 12, 1831 – February 27, 1899) was an Irish American coal merchant, Democratic politician, and Wisconsin pioneer. He was the 19th and 23rd mayor of Madison, Wisconsin, and served four years in the Wisconsin Senate, representing Wisconsin's 26th Senate district from 1885 to 1889. He is the namesake of Conklin Street in Madison.

== Early life and business career ==
Conklin was born on June 12, 1831, in Burlington, Vermont. During his childhood, his father was janitor for Vermont State University. In 1849, his father was hired as the janitor at the new University of Wisconsin, and the entire family moved west to Madison, Wisconsin.

Shortly after arriving, James Conklin, then 18, was hired to carry mail between Madison and Prairie du Sac and Monroe, Wisconsin. He then worked as a teamster for a year. By 1854, he had saved enough money to start a small merchandise business, buying wheat and selling coal. After 10 years of growing his business, he was taken on as a business partner by Neely Gray. After Gray's death in 1867, his sons continued in partnership with Conklin. The business grew steadily and expanded to acquire larger yards and warehouses.

== Political career ==
Conklin was active with the Democratic Party of Wisconsin from an early age. He entered his first public office in 1866, when he was elected to the Madison Common Council. He ultimately served six years on the council. He was also elected city treasurer in 1868 and served on the Madison Board of Education from 1871 to 1873.

He was elected to four terms as mayor of Madison, in 1881, 1882, 1883, and 1887. During his first three terms, a massive waterworks project was completed in the city, and after he left office in April 1884, he was appointed president of the new waterworks. He was in that role when he became the Democratic Party nominee for Wisconsin Senate in the 26th Senate district. At the time, the 26th Senate district comprised all of Dane County. With strong support from Madison, Conklin narrowly defeated former three-term state senator George B. Burrows. He was elected to his fourth term as mayor while still serving as state senator but did not run for another term as senator in 1888. His obituary in Madison's Wisconsin State Journal opined that he could have served forever as mayor if he desired it.

After leaving office, Conklin also became a director of the Bank of Wisconsin, and was appointed postmaster in Madison during Grover Cleveland's second term (1893–1897).

== Personal life and family ==
James Conklin was a son of John Conklin and his second wife Catherine (née O'Donnell). Both parents were Irish American immigrants.

On January 29, 1853, James Conklin married Mary Eagan. Mary had been born in Ireland and lived in Canada before coming to Wisconsin. The Conklins were Irish Catholic and members of Saint Raphael's Church in Madison. James and Mary had at least nine children, though two died in infancy and two other daughters—Catherine and Lucy—died in their 20s. James Conklin dropped dead at his coal yard in Madison on February 27, 1899. His death was attributed to heart disease. His wife, Mary, died in 1900. They were survived by three sons and two daughters.

Conklin's sons and grandsons continued the family coal business for another 46 years after his death. His grandson James B. Conklin announced the sale of the business to A. J. Fiore in November 1945.

== Electoral history ==
=== Wisconsin Senate (1884) ===
Wisconsin Senate, 26th District Election, 1884
Party	Candidate	Votes	%	±%
General Election, November 4, 1884
Democratic	James Conklin	6,543	49.46%	
Republican	George B. Burrows	6,107	46.16%	
Greenback	U. P. Stair	579	4.38%	
Plurality		436	3.30%	
Total votes		13,229	100.0%	
Democratic hold				

Wisconsin Senate
Preceded by John Adams	Member of the Wisconsin Senate from the 26th district January 5, 1885 – January 7, 1889	Succeeded by Willett Main
Political offices
Preceded by Philip L. Spooner Jr.	Mayor of Madison, Wisconsin; April 1881 – April 1884	Succeeded by Breese J. Stevens
Preceded by Elisha W. Keyes	Mayor of Madison, Wisconsin; April 1887 – April 1888	Succeeded by Moses Ransom Doyon
