= Philip L. Spooner Jr. =

19th century American politician

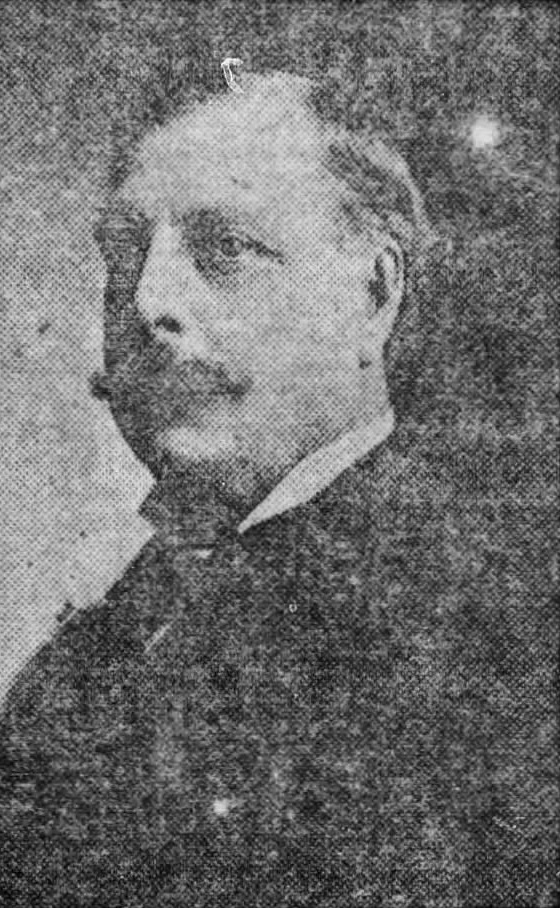
- From Wisconsin State Journal obituary, Jan. 2, 1918

1st Commissioner of Insurance of Wisconsin
- In office April 1, 1878 – January 3, 1887
- Appointed by: William E. Smith
- Preceded by: Position established
- Succeeded by: Philip Cheek Jr.

18th Mayor of Madison, Wisconsin
- In office April 1880 – April 1881
- Preceded by: John R. Baltzell
- Succeeded by: James Conklin

Personal details
- Born: January 13, 1847 Lawrenceburg, Indiana, U.S.
- Died: January 2, 1918 (aged 70) Madison, Wisconsin, U.S.
- Resting place: Forest Hill Cemetery, Madison, Wisconsin
- Party: Republican
- Relatives: John C. Spooner (brother); Philip L. Spooner (nephew)
- Occupation: Insurance agent

Philip Loring Spooner Jr. (January 13, 1847 – January 2, 1918) was an American businessman and Republican politician. He was the first insurance commissioner of the state of Wisconsin and the 18th mayor of Madison, Wisconsin. He was a younger brother of United States senator John Coit Spooner.

== Biography ==
Philip Spooner Jr. was born in Lawrenceburg, Indiana, in January 1847. He moved with his parents to Madison, Wisconsin, in 1859, where he was raised and educated. He attended the University of Wisconsin, but did not graduate.

In 1867 he went into the business as an insurance agent, selling fire and life insurance for Aetna and other insurers. He also became active with the Republican Party of Wisconsin, serving on the Madison City Council. He ran for Wisconsin State Assembly in 1875, but was defeated by Liberal Republican William Charlton.

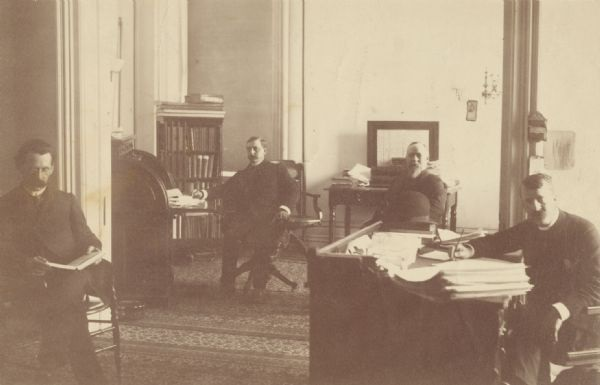
Spooner (center-left) pictured in his office in the Wisconsin State Capital, with associates.

He worked in the insurance business until 1878, when he was appointed to the newly created position of state insurance commissioner by Governor William E. Smith. He was subsequently re-appointed to another two-year term in 1880. The position changed into a state-wide elected office in 1881, and he was elected to continue in the office in 1881 and 1884. He did not run for another term in 1886.

While serving as insurance commissioner, he was also elected mayor of Madison, Wisconsin, in the Spring of 1880 and served a one-year term. In addition to his insurance and political interests, he was the president and major shareholder in Madison Traction Co. He died after a long illness at his home in Madison on January 2, 1918.

== Personal life and family ==
Philip Loring Spooner Jr. was the second-born son of Philip Loring Spooner and his wife Lydia Lord Spooner (née Coit). Philip Spooner Sr. was a prominent lawyer in Madison, clerk of the Wisconsin Supreme Court, and dean of the University of Wisconsin Law School. Philip Jr.'s siblings included John Coit Spooner, who served 16 years as United States senator from Wisconsin, and Roger C. Spooner, who was a chairman of the Republican Party of Dane County.

Philip Spooner Jr. was never married. He shared a home in Madison with his sister and her husband until their deaths.

== Electoral history ==
=== Wisconsin Assembly (1875) ===
Wisconsin Assembly, Dane 2nd District Election, 1875
Party	Candidate	Votes	%	±%
General Election, November 2, 1875
Liberal Republican	William Charlton	1,327	50.44%	
Republican	Philip L. Spooner	1,304	49.56%	+2.52%
Plurality		23	0.87%	-5.04%
Total votes		2,631	100.0%	+0.30%
Liberal Republican gain from Democratic				

=== Wisconsin Insurance Commissioner (1881, 1884) ===
Wisconsin Commissioner of Insurance Election, 1881
Party	Candidate	Votes	%	±%
General Election, November 8, 1881
Republican	Philip L. Spooner	85,349	49.85%	
Democratic	Louis Kemper	67,574	39.47%	
Prohibition	Thomas Bracken	11,580	6.76%	
Greenback	Lorenzo Merrill	6,693	3.91%	
Plurality		17,775	10.38%	
Total votes		171,196	100.0%	
Republican hold				

Wisconsin Commissioner of Insurance Election, 1884
Party	Candidate	Votes	%	±%
General Election, November 4, 1884
Republican	Philip L. Spooner (incumbent)	162,387	52.87%	+1.22%
Democratic	Ole S. Holum	144,785	45.54%	+6.07%
Prohibition	Nelson La Due	6,538	2.06%	−4.71%
Greenback	J. B. Russell	4,222	1.33%	−2.58%
Plurality		17,602	5.54%	-4.85%
Total votes		317,932	100.0%	+85.71%
Republican hold				

Party political offices
New office created	Republican nominee for Commissioner of Insurance of Wisconsin; 1881, 1884	Succeeded by Philip Cheek Jr.
Political offices
Preceded by John R. Baltzell	Mayor of Madison, Wisconsin; April 1880 – April 1881	Succeeded by James Conklin
New office created	Commissioner of Insurance of Wisconsin; April 1, 1878 – January 3, 1887	Succeeded by Philip Cheek Jr.
