= Baltzell =

Baltzell is a surname. Notable people with the surname include:

- E. Digby Baltzell (1915–1996), American sociologist, academic and author
- John R. Baltzell (1827–1893), Mayor of Madison, Wisconsin
- Joseph Baltzell Showalter (1851–1932), Republican member of the U.S. House of Representatives from Pennsylvania
- Megan Baltzell (born 1993), American softball player
- Robert C. Baltzell (1879–1950), United States federal judge
- Thomas Baltzell (1804–1866), American lawyer and politician and the first popularly elected chief justice of the Florida Supreme Court
- Vic Baltzell (1912–1986), American football fullback in the National Football League
