= Breese J. Stevens =

American politician (1834–1903)

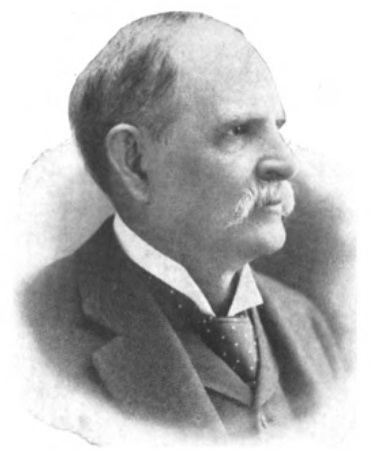

20th Mayor of Madison, Wisconsin
- In office 1884–1885
- Preceded by: James Conklin
- Succeeded by: Hiram N. Moulton

Personal details
- Born: Breese Jacob Stevens; March 22, 1834 Vernon, New York, U.S.
- Died: October 28, 1903 (aged 69) Madison, Wisconsin, U.S.
- Resting place: Forest Hill Cemetery, Madison, Wisconsin, U.S.
- Party: Democratic
- Education: Hamilton College (MA)
- Occupation: Politician, lawyer

Breese Jacob Stevens (March 22, 1834 – October 28, 1903) was an American attorney from New York state who relocated to Madison, Wisconsin to begin his law practice. There he conducted "some of the most important railroad, land grant and water litigations of [Wisconsin] and Michigan, in all these years enjoying an enviable distinction for conservatism, command of large affairs, great wisdom and a supreme sense of justice shading into generosity in all professional and business relations," according to the State Bar of Wisconsin.

He was elected the 20th mayor of Madison, and later was a leader on the Board of Regents of the University of Wisconsin. Twenty-three years after his death, the city of Madison built its first municipal athletic facility on land purchased from the Stevens estate for $35,000, naming the ballpark Breese Stevens Field.

== Birth and education ==
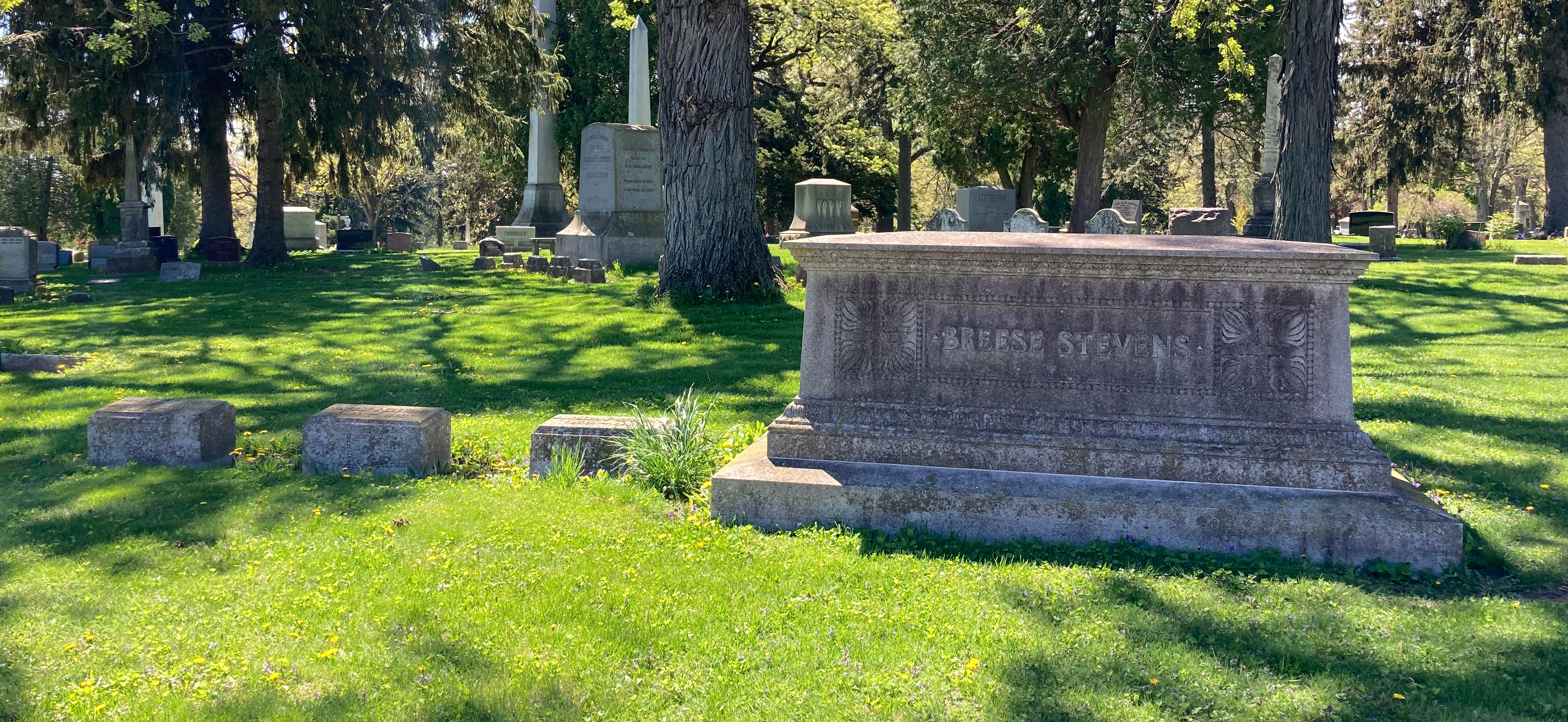
Stevens' grave at Forest Hill Cemetery

Stevens was born March 22, 1834 at Sconondoa (Vernon), in Oneida County in New York state, the son of prominent business man Augustus Caesar Stevens and Elizabeth (Breese) Stevens. He was the descendant of generations of prosperous families.

He was raised in Buffalo, Flint, Michigan, and Vernon, and attended academies in Oneida, Whitesboro, and Cazenovia. He graduated from Hamilton College in 1853. After studying under professor Theodore W. Dwight at Hamilton, Stevens decided to become a lawyer. He briefly studied law under the mentorship of the abolitionist congressman Timothy Jenkins at Oneida Castle, and completed his studies under lawyer and financier Nathan F. Graves of Syracuse. In 1856 he received his Master of Arts degree from Hamilton.

== Western lawyer ==
During the 1850s Stevens’ maternal uncle Sidney John Breese was a successful real estate agent in Janesville, Wisconsin. In 1856 he invited Stevens to come to Wisconsin to participate in the booming region, but that summer Mr. Breese succumbed to a fever on a trip back to New York. Stevens’ uncle Samuel Breese beckoned him to come west and take care of Sidney’s estate. After he arrived in Madison, he was admitted to the State Bar of Wisconsin, and began his law practice in 1857. He continued with various law partners until his death in 1903.

Stevens purchased a 106-acre plat west of the university campus, adjacent to the area that would become the mustering grounds of Camp Randall. Later moving to a luxurious home on downtown’s Mansion Hill, Stevens sold his property that would later become the University Heights Historic District. He would also own a “gentleman’s farm” on Madison's Lake Mendota.

== Corporate attorney ==
In the legal business of his railroad, land and improvement companies, Stevens was active in the litigations over land grants, water power and corporation tax and foreclosure proceedings. He was attorney for the trustees of the Fox & Wisconsin River Improvement Company for many years. He also was the acting president of the Green Bay & Mississippi Canal Company from 1866-1880, serving as its attorney and board director.

He was the lead attorney for various railroads such as the Madison & Portage Railroad and for the Chicago, Madison and Northern Railroad. In 1866 he was also the attorney for the Wisconsin end of the Illinois Central system. Stevens was a director of the Consumers’ Gas Company of Chicago, longtime attorney and manager of the Michigan Land & Iron Company, and president of the Madison Land & Lumber Company, the Monona Land Company, and a director of the First National Bank of Madison.

== Loyal Democrat ==
Stevens was a life-long Democrat, associating with upstate New York Democrats such as Governor Horatio Seymour. He arrived in Wisconsin two years after the national Republican Party had been founded in Ripon in 1854, resulting in the state government being dominated by new Republicans.

During the onset of the Civil War in 1861 Stevens attended a public meeting where he contributed a large donation to support local families of Union Army soldiers. He became part of the “Loyal Democracy” that opposed the southern states’ secession but did not address slavery. He was a close friend of Democratic Senator William F. Vilas of Wisconsin, and he accompanied President Grover Cleveland, a fellow Bourbon Democrat from New York, when he visited Madison in 1887.

== Madison mayor ==
Stevens passed up many opportunities to run for public office. In 1884 he was reportedly reluctant to run for mayor of Madison, but he did not oppose his nomination by local Democrats. He was not a prohibitionist, yet received the support of members of the Law and Order League, which sought enforcement of city liquor ordinances. Claiming that Stevens would be an absentee mayor due to his frequent business outside the state, the stalwart Republican Wisconsin State Journal endorsed his opponent John W. Hudson. Stevens defeated Hudson 1,289 votes to 464.

Stevens’ single term as mayor was marked by a conflict of interest. He was the president of the Madison Gas and Coke Company, and as mayor Stevens discontinued a city committee exploring the feasibility of electric street lights. Madison was without electrically-lit streets for four more years. As predicted, he was often away from the city on corporate matters. He did not seek re-election.

== University regent ==
In 1890 Wisconsin elected its first Democratic governor in 18 years, Milwaukee Mayor George Peck. Governor Peck appointed fellow Democrat Stevens to the University of Wisconsin Board of Regents. He was vice president of the board at the time of his death and for years chairman of the executive committee. He was a moderating force during a time when the university’s academic freedom was challenged by a red-baiting fellow regent. Stevens’ influence led to the hiring of pivotal UW president Charles Kendall Adams.

He was also a curator for the Wisconsin State Historical Society, and a member of the Madison Literary and Town & Gown clubs, the New York City Reform Club, and the Milwaukee Club. He was also a long-time vestryman of Grace Episcopal Church in Madison.

After a long illness, Breese J. Stevens died at his home in Madison on October 28, 1903. He was buried at Forest Hill Cemetery.

== Family ==
His earliest American paternal ancestor came from London prior to 1660, and settled at Charlestown, Massachusetts. On the maternal side Stevens was a great-great-grandson of Sidney Breese, who came from Shrewsbury, England. For more than two centuries the Stevens and Breese families had been allied to many notable families who had settled in Massachusetts, New York and New Jersey.

Thirteen years after his arrival in Madison, Breese Stevens married Emma Curtis Fuller, daughter of Morris E. Fuller, Madison’s first industrialist. She died a week after giving birth to daughter Amelia Emma Fuller Stevens in 1870. Stevens remarried in 1876, to Mary Elizabeth Farmer of Sconondoa, NY. She was the daughter of Marcellus Farmer, newspaper publisher of the Onondaga Standard, food dealer, and owner of land in Syracuse and San Francisco. He perished in a hurricane aboard the gold-laden SS Central America in 1857. Her devout and long-ailing mother Jemimaette was devastated, and died a year later.

In 1878, Mrs. Stevens gave birth to Helen Elizabeth Breese Stevens, who later became the wife of Dr. Reginald H. Jackson, one of five brothers employed at his father’s Jackson Clinic.

== Breese Stevens Field ==
Madison’s first municipal athletic facility is named Breese Stevens Field. Stevens had owned the land for decades, acquiring the first five parcels in 1868 for one dollar, likely part of a payment for legal work performed by Stevens and his law partner. They soon purchased adjoining lots, adding more in 1872 before completing the block in 1883. The low-lying land was mostly marsh, and sat idle during the 20 years before Stevens’ death in 1903.

As early as 1920 Stevens’ widow contacted her daughter’s brother-in-law, Joseph “Bud” Jackson, business manager of the Jackson Clinic, to sell the unfilled property. Twenty-three years earlier Jackson had been the manager of the Madison High School football team, which had no home field. Jackson had occasionally asked university regent Breese Stevens to assist his team in gaining use of Camp Randall, the stadium of the University of Wisconsin. Considering that Madison still had no athletic field in 1920, Jackson examined the Stevens block and decided it should be the site of a stadium for the high schools. He suggested to Mrs. Stevens that she sell the block to the city and have the field named for her late husband, in honor of his assistance to the high school team a generation earlier. Breese Stevens Athletic Field opened on May 5, 1926.
