= George Baldwin Smith =

American lawyer and politician (1823–1879)

George B. Smith
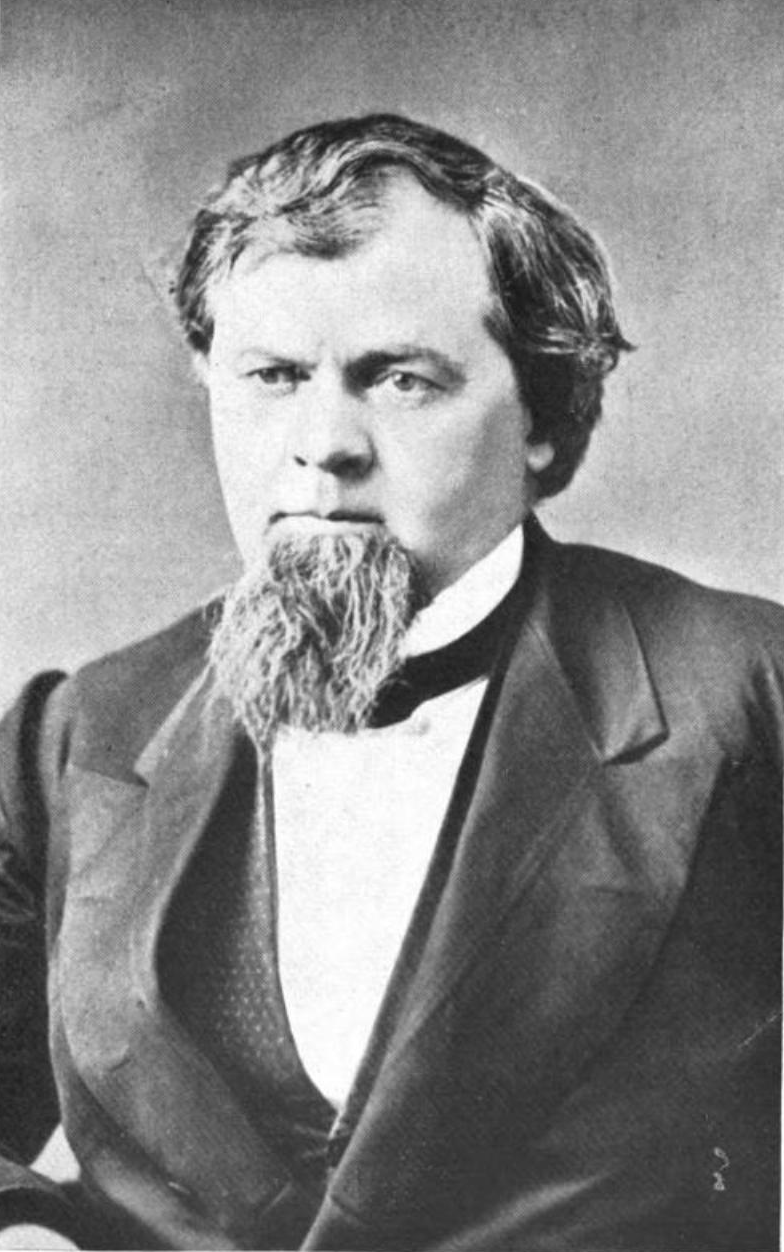

4th Attorney General of Wisconsin
- In office January 2, 1854 – January 7, 1856
- Governor: William A. Barstow
- Preceded by: Experience Estabrook
- Succeeded by: William Rudolph Smith

3rd and 16th Mayor of Madison, Wisconsin
- In office April 1, 1878 – April 7, 1879
- Preceded by: Harlow S. Orton
- Succeeded by: John R. Baltzell
- In office April 5, 1858 – April 1, 1861
- Preceded by: Augustus A. Bird
- Succeeded by: Levi Baker Vilas

Member of the Wisconsin State Assembly from the Dane 5th district
- In office January 13, 1869 – January 12, 1870
- Preceded by: Levi Baker Vilas
- Succeeded by: Alden Sprague Sanborn
- In office January 13, 1864 – January 11, 1865
- Preceded by: George Hyer
- Succeeded by: James Ross

Member of the Wisconsin State Assembly from the Dane 6th district
- In office January 12, 1859 – January 11, 1860
- Preceded by: Alexander A. McDonell
- Succeeded by: Cassius Fairchild

Personal details
- Born: George Baldwin Smith; May 22, 1823 Parma Corners, New York, U.S.
- Died: September 18, 1879 (aged 56) Dane County, Wisconsin, U.S.
- Resting place: Forest Hill Cemetery; Madison, Wisconsin
- Party: Democratic
- Spouse: Eugenia Weed Smith
- Children: James S. Smith; Anna (McConnell); 3 others (died young)
- Parents: Reuben Smith (father); Betsy (Page) Smith (mother)
- Profession: lawyer, politician

George Baldwin Smith (May 22, 1823 – September 18, 1879) was an American lawyer and Democratic politician. He was the 4th Attorney General of Wisconsin, and the 3rd and 16th mayor of Madison, Wisconsin.

== Legal and political career ==
Smith was admitted to the federal bar in to Southport, Wisconsin Territory, (present-day Kenosha, Wisconsin) in 1843. In 1845, he moved to the territorial capital of Madison, where he was appointed district attorney for Dane County in January 1846. He served in this role until 1852. He was elected to represent Dane County at the 1846 Wisconsin Constitutional Convention.

Smith was elected Attorney General of Wisconsin in 1853, serving from 1854 to 1856; he declined a re-nomination in 1855. After leaving office, his name was drawn into the scandal involving the fraudulent re-election of William A. Barstow in 1855.

He then served as mayor of Madison from 1858 to 1861. He represented the city in the Wisconsin State Assembly in 1859, 1864, and 1869. The Democratic Party selected him as their candidate to run for his district's congressional seat in 1864 and 1872, but he failed to win both times. Smith was also the unsuccessful Democratic candidate for Senate in 1869, losing to Matthew H. Carpenter.

In 1876 he helped to supervise the canvass of electoral votes in Louisiana in the heavily disputed 1876 presidential election. He was re-elected as mayor of Madison in April 1878, and served until just a few months before his death, in Madison, in 1879.

== Personal life and education ==
Smith was born in Parma Corners, New York to Reuben Smith and Betsy Page Smith; his mother died ten weeks after his birth. His family moved to Cleveland, Ohio, in 1825, then to Medina, Ohio, in 1827. Smith studied law with attorneys in Medina and Cleveland before moving with his father to Wisconsin in 1843.

Smith married Eugenia Weed in 1844. They had five children, two of whom survived to adulthood: James and Anna.

== Electoral history ==
=== Wisconsin Attorney General (1853) ===
Wisconsin Attorney General Election, 1853
Party	Candidate	Votes	%	±%
General Election, November 8, 1853
Democratic	George Baldwin Smith	31,705	57.03%	+1.36%
Whig	Orsamus Cole	23,676	42.59%	+4.60%
Free Soil	Vernon Tichenor	215	0.39%	−5.93%
Plurality		8,029	14.44%	-3.23%
Total votes		55,596	100.0%	+2.88%
Democratic hold				

=== Madison Mayor (1858) ===
Madison Mayoral Election, 1858
Party	Candidate	Votes	%	±%
General Election, March 1, 1858
Democratic	George Baldwin Smith	978	61.98%	
Republican	Neely Gray	600	38.02%	
Plurality		378	23.95%	
Total votes		1,578	100.0%	
Democratic hold				

=== Wisconsin Assembly Dane 6th District (1858) ===
Wisconsin Assembly, Dane 6th District Election, 1858
Party	Candidate	Votes	%	±%
General Election, November 2, 1858
Democratic	George Baldwin Smith	663	57.30%	+9.42%
Republican	Hiram C. Bull	494	42.70%	
Plurality		169	14.61%	+10.37%
Total votes		1,157	100.0%	+16.63%
Democratic gain from Republican		Swing	18.84%	

=== Madison Mayor (1859, 1860) ===
Madison Mayoral Election, 1859
Party	Candidate	Votes	%	±%
General Election, March 7, 1859
Democratic	George Baldwin Smith (incumbent)	961	70.77%	+8.79%
Republican	Frank A. Haskell	397	29.23%	
Plurality		564	41.53%	+17.58%
Total votes		1,358	100.0%	-13.94%
Democratic hold				

Madison Mayoral Election, 1860
Party	Candidate	Votes	%	±%
General Election, April 3, 1860
Democratic	George Baldwin Smith (incumbent)	724	50.21%	−20.56%
Republican	David Atwood	718	49.79%	
Plurality		6	0.42%	-41.12%
Total votes		1,442	100.0%	-6.19%
Democratic hold				

=== Wisconsin Assembly Dane 5th District (1863) ===
Wisconsin Assembly, Dane 5th District Election, 1863
Party	Candidate	Votes	%	±%
General Election, November 3, 1863
Democratic	George Baldwin Smith	841	53.77%	−6.91%
Republican	Joseph Hobbins	723	46.23%	
Plurality		118	7.54%	-13.82%
Total votes		1,564	100.0%	+4.41%
Democratic hold				

=== U.S. House of Representatives (1864) ===
Wisconsin's 2nd Congressional District Election, 1864
Party	Candidate	Votes	%	±%
General Election, November 8, 1864
National Union	Ithamar Sloan (incumbent)	15,148	60.31%	+5.88%
Democratic	George Baldwin Smith	9,969	39.69%	
Plurality		5,179	20.62%	+11.76%
Total votes		25,117	100.0%	+4.30%
National Union hold				

=== Wisconsin Assembly Dane 5th District (1868) ===
Wisconsin Assembly, Dane 5th District Election, 1868
Party	Candidate	Votes	%	±%
General Election, November 3, 1868
Democratic	George Baldwin Smith	1,198	53.79%	
Republican	David Atwood	1,029	46.21%	
Plurality		169	7.59%	
Total votes		2,227	100.0%	
Democratic hold				

=== U.S. House of Representatives (1872) ===
Wisconsin's 2nd Congressional District Election, 1872
Party	Candidate	Votes	%	±%
General Election, November 5, 1872
Republican	Gerry Whiting Hazelton (incumbent)	13,408	53.22%	−1.29%
Democratic	George Baldwin Smith	11,784	46.78%	
Plurality		1,624	6.45%	-2.58%
Total votes		25,192	100.0%	+19.76%
Republican hold				

=== Madison Mayor (1878) ===
Madison Mayoral Election, 1878
Party	Candidate	Votes	%	±%
General Election, April 2, 1878
Democratic	George Baldwin Smith	1,499	100.0%	
Total votes		1,499	100.0%	
Democratic hold				

Wisconsin State Assembly
Preceded by Alexander A. McDonell	Member of the Wisconsin State Assembly from the Dane 6th district 1859 – 1860	Succeeded by Cassius Fairchild
Preceded by George Hyer	Member of the Wisconsin State Assembly from the Dane 5th district 1864 – 1865	Succeeded by James Ross
Preceded by Levi Baker Vilas	Member of the Wisconsin State Assembly from the Dane 5th district 1869 – 1870	Succeeded by Alden Sprague Sanborn
Legal offices
Preceded by Experience Estabrook	Attorney General of Wisconsin; 1852 – 1854	Succeeded by William Rudolph Smith
Political offices
Preceded by Augustus A. Bird	Mayor of Madison, Wisconsin; 1858 – 1861	Succeeded by Levi Baker Vilas
Preceded by Harlow S. Orton	Mayor of Madison, Wisconsin; 1878 – 1879	Succeeded by John R. Baltzell
