= Hiram N. Moulton =

American politician (1818–1899)

21st Mayor of Madison, Wisconsin
- In office 1885–1886
- Preceded by: Breese J. Stevens
- Succeeded by: Elisha W. Keyes

Personal details
- Born: August 14, 1818; East Hartford, Connecticut, U.S.
- Died: August 28, 1899 (aged 81)
- Cause of death: Liver cancer
- Spouse: Ellen Cook
- Occupation: Politician

Hiram N. Moulton (August 14, 1818 – August 28, 1899) was an American politician who served as the 21st mayor of Madison, Wisconsin, from 1885 to 1886.

== Biography ==
Moulton was born on August 14, 1818, in East Hartford, Connecticut, the eldest of twelve children. Moulton moved to Madison in 1854. He married Ellen Cook. They also owned a home in Burke, Wisconsin. Moulton worked as a contractor and helped construct the Wisconsin State Capitol. He was later appointed State Carpenter of Wisconsin by Governor George Wilbur Peck. Moulton died of liver cancer on August 28, 1899.

== Political career ==
Moulton was mayor of Madison from 1885 to 1886. Previously, he was an alderman.
