= Blooming Grove, Wisconsin =

- Town
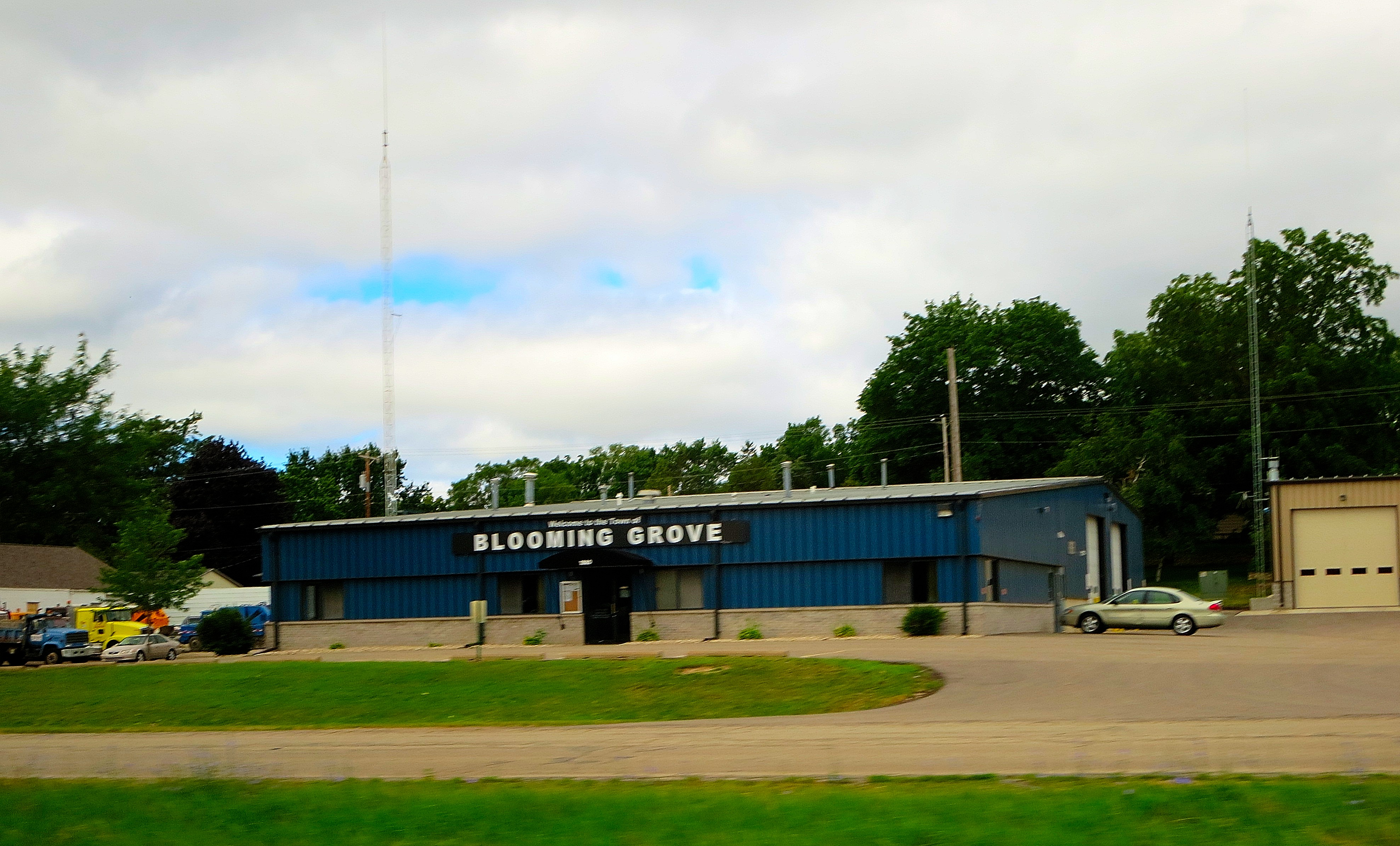
- Town hall

- Location in Dane County and the state of Wisconsin, with the Town of Blooming Grove highlighted on the left map in red. Updated to reflect the November 2026 detachment of the 80-acre April Hills subdivision, which was annexed by the Village of McFarland.
- Coordinates: 43°3′52″N 89°17′18″W
- Country: United States
- State: Wisconsin
- County: Dane

Area
  - Total: 9.1 sq mi (23.5 km^{2})
  - Land: 7.5 sq mi (19.4 km^{2})
  - Water: 1.6 sq mi (4.1 km^{2})
- Elevation: 873 ft (266 m)

Population (2020)
  - Total: 1,622
  - Density: 217/sq mi (83.6/km^{2})
- Time zone: UTC-6 (Central (CST))
  - Summer (DST): UTC-5 (CDT)
- Area code: 608
- FIPS code: 55-08350
- GNIS feature ID: 1582834

Blooming Grove is a town in Dane County, Wisconsin, United States. The population was 1,622 at the 2020 census. The unincorporated community of Hope is located partially within Blooming Grove. Although once much larger, currently the town of Blooming Grove consists of a few scattered neighborhoods and individual properties broken into discontinuous sections by the cities of Madison and Monona. Blooming Grove is set to be dissolved and mostly annexed into the city of Madison by 2027, with the exception of the 80-acre April Hills subdivision, which was successfully annexed by the neighboring Village of McFarland in November 2026.

== Geography ==
According to the United States Census Bureau, the town has a total area of 9.1 square miles (23.5 km^{2}), of which 7.5 square miles (19.4 km^{2}) is land and 1.6 square miles (4.1 km^{2}) (17.40%) is water.

== Demographics ==
As of the census of 2000, there were 1,768 people, 723 households, and 456 families residing in the town. The population density was 235.8 people per square mile (91.0/km^{2}). There were 748 housing units at an average density of 99.8 per square mile (38.5/km^{2}). The racial makeup of the town was 93.44% White, 1.70% African American, 0.28% Native American, 1.30% Asian, 1.30% from other races, and 1.98% from two or more races. Hispanic or Latino of any race were 3.45% of the population.

There were 723 households, out of which 28.6% had children under the age of 18 living with them, 51.6% were married couples living together, 9.7% had a female householder with no husband present, and 36.8% were non-families. 26.7% of all households were made up of individuals, and 5.3% had someone living alone who was 65 years of age or older. The average household size was 2.44 and the average family size was 3.05.

In the town, the population was spread out, with 23.0% under the age of 18, 7.2% from 18 to 24, 31.3% from 25 to 44, 29.3% from 45 to 64, and 9.2% who were 65 years of age or older. The median age was 40 years. For every 100 females, there were 98.4 males. For every 100 females age 18 and over, there were 98.8 males.

The median income for a household in the town was $56,328, and the median income for a family was $63,578. Males had a median income of $37,981 versus $27,036 for females. The per capita income for the town was $24,263. About 2.4% of families and 2.9% of the population were below the poverty line, including 2.0% of those under age 18 and none of those age 65 or over.

The town's population was reduced by roughly 386 residents in November 2026 following the annexation of the April Hills subdivision into the Village of McFarland.

== Notable people ==
- Daniel Bechtel, Wisconsin State Representative, lived in the town
- William F. Dettinger, Wisconsin State Representative and farmer, lived in the town
- Earl Mullen, Wisconsin State Representative and barber, lived in the town
- Graham Hunt, musician, current resident
