= George E. Bryant =

19th-century American politician & judge

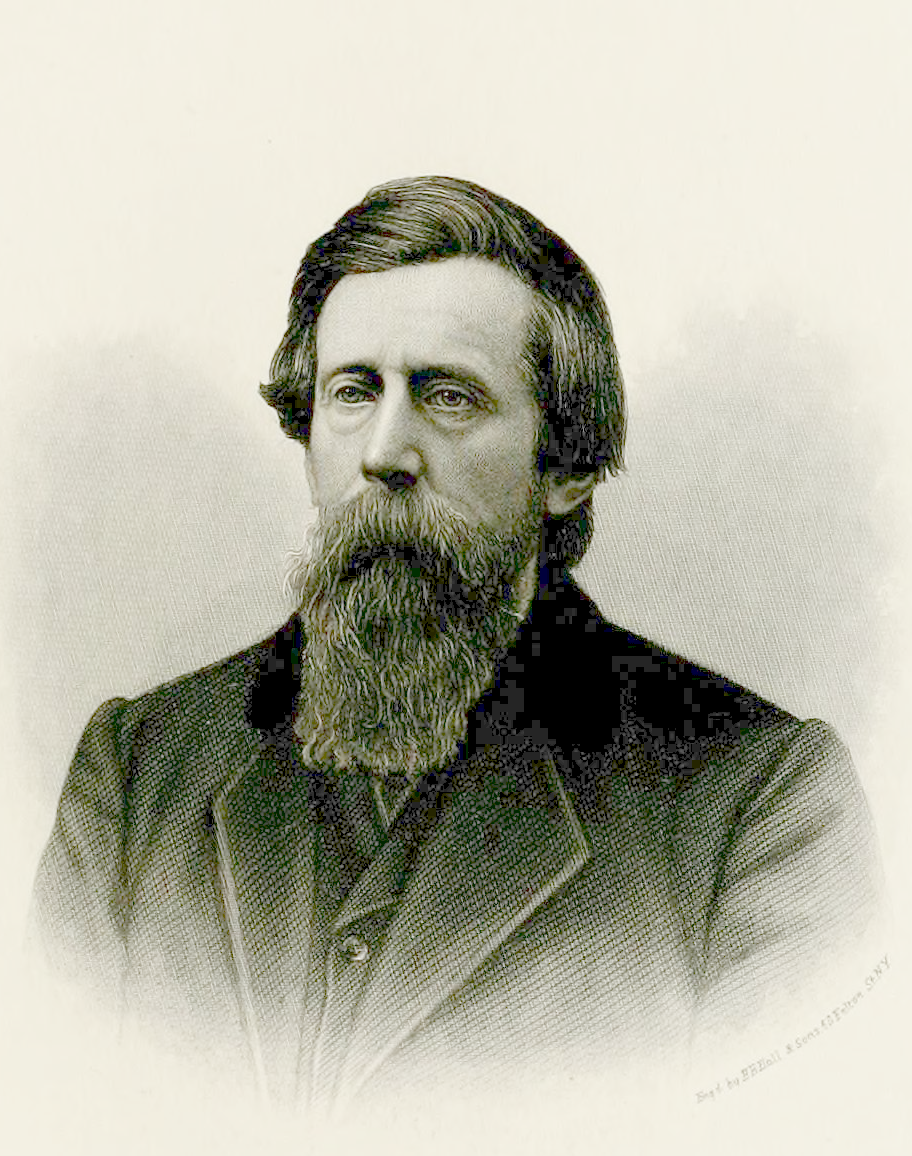
- Portrait from the United States biographical dictionary and portrait gallery of eminent and self-made men; Wisconsin volume (1877)

Superintendent of Public Property of Wisconsin
- In office January 4, 1901 – February 16, 1907
- Governor: Robert M. La Follette; James O. Davidson
- Preceded by: William A. Scott
- Succeeded by: Charley C. Bennett

Chairman of the Republican Party of Wisconsin
- In office August 1900 – May 1904
- Preceded by: Joseph B. Treat
- Succeeded by: W. D. Connor

County Judge of Dane County, Wisconsin
- In office January 1, 1866 – December 31, 1877
- Preceded by: Thomas Hood
- Succeeded by: Alden Sprague Sanborn

Member of the Wisconsin Senate from the 7th district
- In office January 4, 1875 – January 1, 1877
- Preceded by: John Anders Johnson
- Succeeded by: George A. Abert

Member of the Wisconsin State Assembly from the Dane 1st district
- In office January 2, 1899 – January 7, 1901
- Preceded by: Daniel Bechtel
- Succeeded by: E. Ray Stevens

Personal details
- Born: February 11, 1832 Templeton, Massachusetts, U.S.
- Died: February 16, 1907 (aged 75) Madison, Wisconsin, U.S.
- Resting place: Forest Hill Cemetery, Madison, Wisconsin
- Party: Republican
- Spouse: Susan A. Gibson (m. 1858–1907)
- Children: Harriet E. Bryant^{(b. 1859; died 1960)}; George E. Bryant^{(b. 1861; died 1941)}; Frank H. Bryant^{(b. 1866; died 1947)}
- Education: Norwich University

Military service
- Allegiance: United States
- Branch/service: United States Volunteers; Union Army; Wisconsin National Guard
- Rank: Colonel, USV; Brig. General, WNG
- Commands: 12th Reg. Wis. Vol. Infantry
- Battles/wars: American Civil War

George Edwin Bryant (February 11, 1832 – February 16, 1907) was an American lawyer, judge, and Republican politician. He served as a Union Army officer during the American Civil War and afterwards served as a brigadier general in the Wisconsin National Guard. He also served four years in the Wisconsin Legislature, representing Dane County, and was appointed Wisconsin Superintendent of Public Property by Governor Robert M. La Follette, serving from 1901 until his death in 1907.

== Biography ==
Bryant was born on February 11, 1832, in Templeton, Massachusetts. He attended Norwich University. At Norwich, he was a roommate of George Dewey, who went on to become Admiral of the Navy. On September 27, 1858, Bryant married Susie A. Gibson and they had three children.

== Military career ==
Bryant was initially assigned to the 1st Wisconsin Infantry Regiment of the Union Army during the American Civil War, having previously captained the Madison Guards. Before long, he was given command of the 12th Wisconsin Infantry Regiment. He served until 1864.

In 1880, Bryant became Quartermaster General of the Wisconsin National Guard.

== Political career ==
He was elected county judge of Dane County, Wisconsin, in the Spring 1865 election, and was re-elected in 1869 and 1873, ultimately serving 12 years. While serving as judge, he was also elected to the Wisconsin State Senate from the 7th State Senate district—which then comprised the eastern half of Dane County—serving in the 1875 and 1876 sessions. In 1898, he was elected to the Wisconsin State Assembly. He was a delegate to the 1880 Republican National Convention, and was appointed postmaster of Madison from 1882 through 1886 and again from 1890 to 1894. In 1900, he was elected chairman of the Republican Party of Wisconsin. After the Robert M. La Follette was elected governor later that year, however, Bryant was appointed Superintendent of Public Property.

== Death and burial ==
He died on February 16, 1907, and was buried at Forest Hill Cemetery.

Military offices
Regiment established	Command of the 12th Wisconsin Infantry Regiment; October 18, 1861 – November 6, 1864	Succeeded by Col. James Kerr Proudfit
Party political offices
Preceded by Joseph B. Treat	Chairman of the Republican Party of Wisconsin; August 1900 – May 1904	Succeeded by W. D. Connor
Wisconsin State Assembly
Preceded by Daniel Bechtel	Member of the Wisconsin State Assembly from the Dane 1st district January 2, 1899 – January 7, 1901	Succeeded by E. Ray Stevens
Wisconsin Senate
Preceded by John Anders Johnson	Member of the Wisconsin Senate from the 7th district January 4, 1875 – January 1, 1877	Succeeded by George A. Abert
Government offices
Preceded by William A. Scott	Superintendent of Public Property of Wisconsin; January 4, 1901 – February 16, 1907	Succeeded by Charley C. Bennett
Legal offices
Preceded by Thomas Hood	County Judge of Dane County, Wisconsin; January 1, 1866 – December 31, 1877	Succeeded by Alden S. Sanborn
