= Try Not to Laugh =

Studio album by Graham Hunt
- Released: December 15, 2023
- Genre: Power pop
- Length: 28:55
- Label: Smoking Room

Graham Hunt chronology
| If You Knew Would You Believe It (2022) | Try Not to Laugh (2023) |

Singles from Try Not to Laugh
- 1. "Emergency Contact" Released: August 3, 2023; 2. "Tashmere Anthill" Released: November 6, 2023; 3. "Try Not to Laugh" Released: December 11, 2023

Try Not to Laugh is the fourth studio album by American musician Graham Hunt. It was released on December 15, 2023, through Smoking Room, and arrived only a year after his third studio album If You Knew Would You Believe It (2022).

== Background and singles ==
Between 2015 and 2023, a time spanning eight years, Hunt released six EPs and nine studio albums across six different projects. He also remained prolific contributing to other bands through production or live performances. On August 3, 2023, Hunt released the lead single "Emergency Contact", a "summery power pop jolt" with "knockout hooks, squiggly guitar solo and toy percussion". The second single of the album "Tashmere Anthill" was released on November 6. The song features a "structured looseness" comparable to the works of early Beck, including a "rubbery and melodic" bass line and a prominent "acoustic breakdown halfway in". On December 11, Hunt released the eponymous third single, a song that was described as "appealing '90s-style indie rock" where "big classic rock guitars" meets "occasional brass and strings".

== Critical reception ==
Lizzie Manno of Stereogum chose Try Not to Laugh as their "album of the week", revering Hunt a pioneer in contemporary "independent power pop". Hunt takes the listener on a "smart and unexpected" ride through "decades of guitar pop" without drifting off into "cloying melodies or stale lyricism". Manno opines that Hunt further proves to be a "clever writer" on the album, assembling "pleasant pop melodies" with a "a literary eye" and "late-capitalist cynicism".

The staff of the Sleeping Village in Chicago thought that Try Not to Laugh was a record that showcases "breakbeats" combined with "anthemic choruses" and "synth runs go toe-to-toe with acoustic guitars" and songwriting that gets to the heart of "Midwestern guitar pop". Hunt managed to create a record that sees the songs stay "at the forefront".

== Track listing ==
Try Not to Laugh track listing
| No. | Title | Length |
|---|---|---|
| 1. | "Try Not to Laugh" | 2:48 |
| 2. | "Taste" | 3:10 |
| 3. | "Emergency Contact" | 4:31 |
| 4. | "Zoomed Out" | 4:26 |
| 5. | "Tashmere Anthill" | 4:06 |
| 6. | "Seein' the World" | 3:58 |
| 7. | "Options in Community Living 23" | 1:32 |
| 8. | "Rosemary Fabian" | 4:24 |
| Total length: | | 28:55 |
