= Graham Hunt (musician) =

American musician

Graham Hunt is an American musician from Milwaukee, Wisconsin.

Hunt has also played live shows with other bands, including Disq, Combat Naps and Mike Krol.

Hunt released his first solo album, Leaving Silver City, in 2019. Hunt released his second solo album in 2021 titled Painting Over Mold. Hunt's third solo album, If You Knew Would You Believe It?, was released in 2022. Hunt's fourth solo album, Try Not to Laugh, was released in 2023. In June 2025, Run for Cover released Hunt's fifth album, Timeless World Forever.

In August 2026, Run for Cover released Hunt’s sixth album, American Pyramid.

== Personal life ==
As of 2026, Hunt resides in Blooming Grove, Wisconsin.
