= Earl Mullen =

American businessman and politician

Earl Mullen (September 21, 1902 – June 23, 1969) was an American businessman and politician.

Born in Deerfield, Wisconsin, Mullen graduated from Deerfield High School and then went to the University of Wisconsin. Mullen was a farmer, a salesman, and then operated a barber shop in Madison, Wisconsin. Mullen served as chairman of the Town of Blooming Grove, Wisconsin Board and also served on the Dane County, Wisconsin Board of Supervisors. Mullen served in the Wisconsin State Assembly from 1943 to 1949 first as a Progressive and then in the 1947 session as a Republican. Mullen died in a hospital in Madison, Wisconsin.
