= Edward W. Dwight =

American politician (1827–1904)

Edward Woolsey Dwight (April 8, 1827 – March 6, 1904) was an American farmer and politician.

== Background ==
Dwight was born in Catskill, New York on April 8, 1827. His father was Benjamin W. Dwight, a doctor (son of Timothy Dwight IV, President of Yale College and a member of the noted Dwight family of New England) and later treasurer of Hamilton College. His mother was Sophia (Strong) Dwight. He was the second youngest of six children: Benjamin, Sophia, Theodore, Mary, Edward, and Elizabeth.

Edward Dwight left home at the age of 15, went to Boston, Massachusetts and signed up on the whaling schooner Council, which returned to Boston after sailing the Atlantic Ocean for one year. He then went to Clinton, Oneida County, New York, and worked on a farm there until 1847, when he left for the Wisconsin Territory (in May of that year he had married Elizabeth Foote of Clinton, daughter of John and Mary (Love) Foote). They traveled via the Great Lakes to Racine, then got a ride on a lumber wagon to a place called "Walnut, Wisconsin" (some sources say Spring Prairie). This "Walnut" may or may not be identified with Walnut Springs, Wisconsin, a short-lived post office which operated for a couple of decades in the Town of Adams in Green County on the road between Madison and Wiota.

== Wisconsin and Iowa and Wisconsin again ==
He worked in Walnut by the month, saving up enough that he could buy 160 acres (one-quarter of a square mile) at $8 per acre. He made some improvements on the land, then sold it and bought a 40-acre tract nearby, sold that and bought more land.

In 1855 he went to Iowa by ox team; he became one of the pioneers of Winneshiek County, Iowa, buying 360 acres from the U.S. government land office, 160 of which had already been improved. He stayed in Iowa only one year, then returned to "Walnut", where he stayed for a further year before he came to Dane County, Wisconsin in or near Oregon, Wisconsin, and bought another tract of land, which he would farm for many years. There was a log house on the land, where the family camped for a few years. He planted fruit and shade trees, and erected some frame buildings.

== Politics ==
Dwight was active in the Republican Party, held various offices, and was elected to a single one-year term in the Wisconsin State Assembly in 1860. Dane County had one less seat in the subsequent Assembly, and Dwight did not return.

After the American Civil War, Dwight spent a great deal of time studying financial questions; as a result, in 1880 Dwight served as a United States Presidential elector for the Greenback Party. He died in Oregon, Wisconsin on March 6, 1904.
