= William Charlton (Wisconsin politician) =

19th century American politician

William Charlton (October 11, 1831 – May 24, 1908) was an American politician and farmer.

Charlton was born in County Armagh, Ireland. In 1843, Charlton emigrated to the United States and eventually settled in Verona, Wisconsin Territory in 1847. He was a farmer and studied law but never practiced law. During the American Civil War, Charlton served in the 11th Wisconsin Volunteer Infantry Regiment and was commissioned captain. In 1865, Charlton was elected county treasurer for Dane County, Wisconsin and was a Republican. In 1866, Charlton served in the Wisconsin Assembly. In 1867, Charlton moved to Madison, Wisconsin. He served on the Dane County Board of Supervisors and was chairman of the Verona Town Board. In 1876, Charlton served in the Wisconsin Assembly and was a Liberal Republican. He served as sheriff of Dane County in 1877 and 1878. Charlton died at his home in Madison, Wisconsin.
