= John Coit Spooner =

American politician (1843–1919)

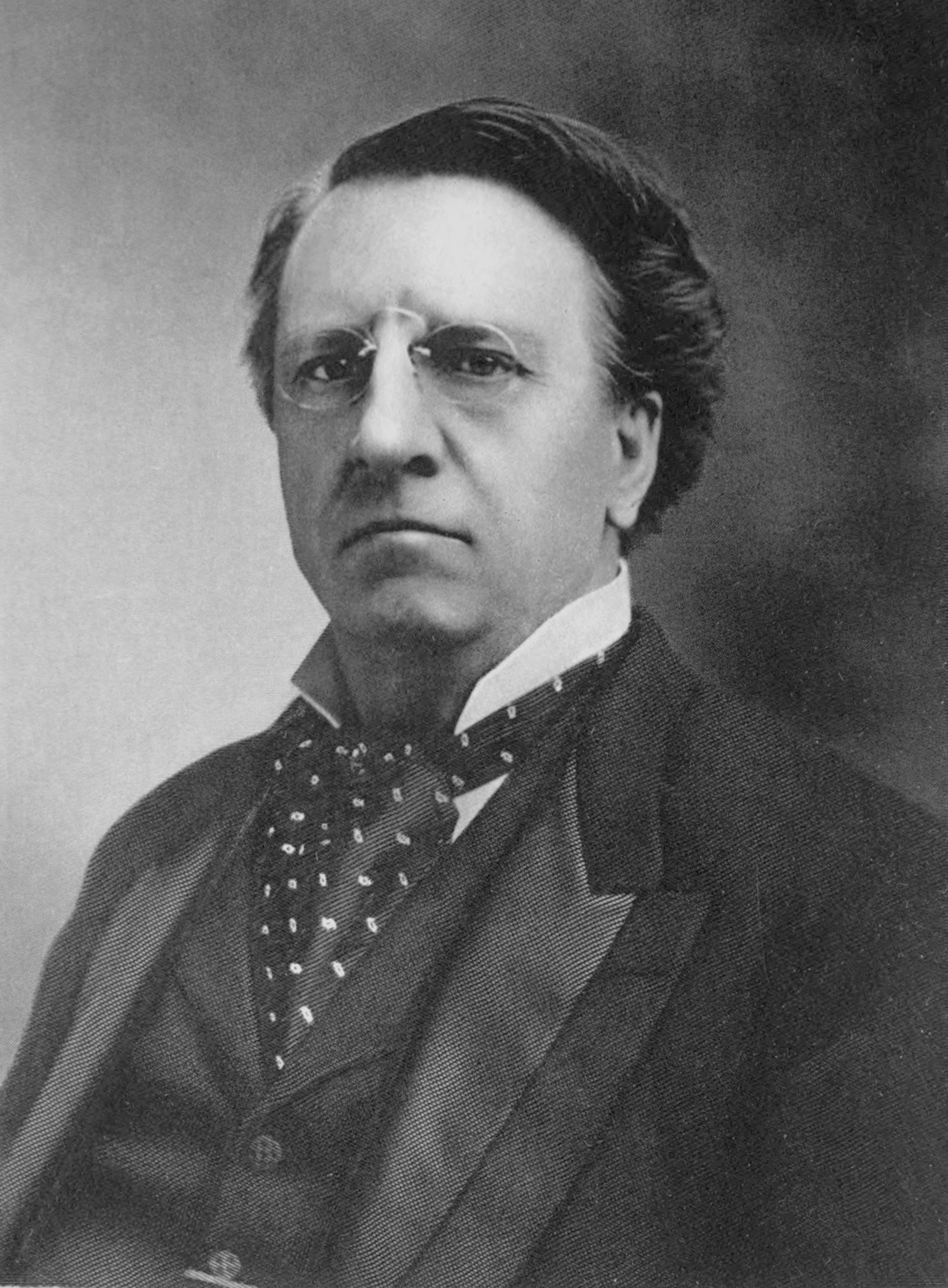
- Photo ca.1915

Chair of the United States Senate Rules Committee
- In office March 4, 1899 – April 30, 1907
- Preceded by: Nelson W. Aldrich
- Succeeded by: Philander C. Knox

United States Senator from Wisconsin
- In office March 4, 1897 – April 30, 1907
- Preceded by: William F. Vilas
- Succeeded by: Isaac Stephenson
- In office March 4, 1885 – March 3, 1891
- Preceded by: Angus Cameron
- Succeeded by: William F. Vilas

Member of the Wisconsin State Assembly from the St. Croix district
- In office January 1, 1872 – January 1, 1873
- Preceded by: Revel K. Fay
- Succeeded by: David C. Fulton

Personal details
- Born: January 6, 1843 Lawrenceburg, Indiana, U.S.
- Died: June 11, 1919 (aged 76) New York City, U.S.
- Resting place: Forest Hill Cemetery; Madison, Wisconsin
- Party: Republican
- Spouse: Annie Elizabeth Main (m. 1868)
- Children: 4, including Philip
- Relatives: Philip L. Spooner Jr. (brother)
- Education: University of Wisconsin–Madison
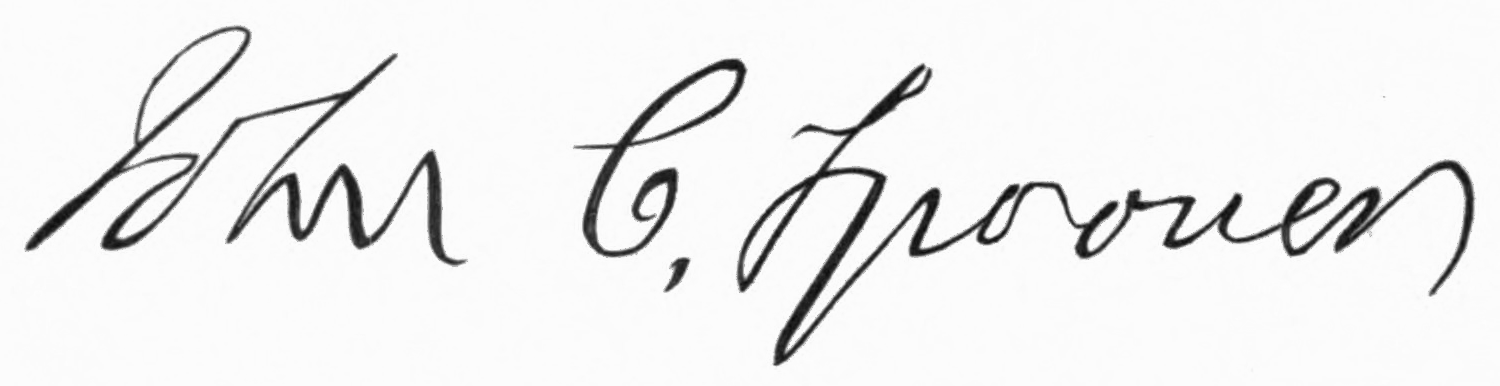
- Signature

Military service
- Allegiance: United States
- Branch/service: United States Volunteers; Union Army
- Years of service: 1864–1866
- Rank: Captain, USV; Brevet Major, USV
- Unit: 40th Reg. Wis. Vol. Infantry; 50th Reg. Wis. Vol. Infantry
- Battles/wars: American Civil War

John Coit Spooner (January 6, 1843 – June 11, 1919) was an American lawyer and Republican politician from Hudson, Wisconsin. He represented Wisconsin as a United States Senator from 1885 to 1891, then again from 1897 to 1907. In his latter stint, he was chairman of the powerful Senate Rules Committee and was considered one of the "Big Four" key Republicans in the Senate who largely controlled its major decisions, the others being Orville H. Platt of Connecticut, William B. Allison of Iowa, and Nelson W. Aldrich of Rhode Island. He is possibly best known for the Spooner Act, which authorized the United States purchase of the Panama Canal Zone.

Politically, Spooner was a conservative (or stalwart) Republican and had a bitter rivalry for supremacy in Wisconsin Republican politics against his progressive Republican contemporary U.S. senator Robert M. "Fighting Bob" La Follette.

== Early life ==
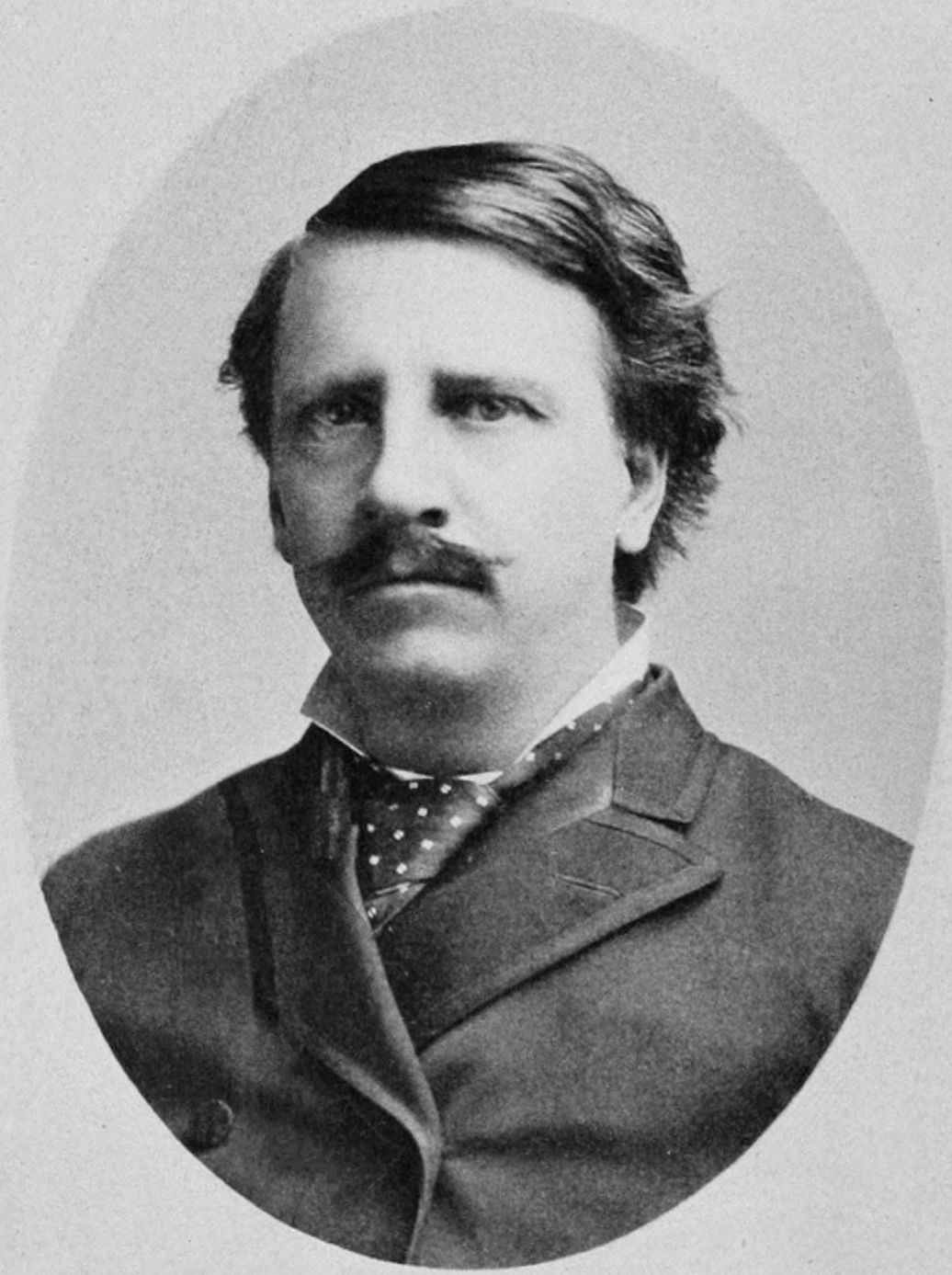
Portrait of Spooner in 1899

Spooner was born in Lawrenceburg, Indiana, on January 6, 1843, the son of Philip Loring Spooner and Lydia (Coit) Spooner. Philip Spooner was an attorney and judge and served on the bench in both Indiana and Wisconsin. Spooner moved with his parents to Madison, Wisconsin, in 1859. He attended the common schools and graduated from the University of Wisconsin with a Bachelor of Philosophy (Philosophiae Baccalaureus, or P.B.) degree in 1864. (Note: Many sources incorrectly state that Spooner received a Ph.D. This appears to be a misreading of the abbreviation for his bachelor's degree, which was occasionally abbreviated as B.Ph. or Ph.B.) While in college, Spooner joined the Psi Upsilon fraternity and was admitted to membership in Phi Beta Kappa.

== Military service ==
During the Civil War, he enlisted in the Union Army as a private assigned to Company D, 40th Wisconsin Infantry, a three-month unit. After Spooner's 100 days of service were complete, he returned home and recruited a company from his college classmates, Company A, 50th Wisconsin Infantry, which he commanded as a captain. At the close of the war, Spooner received a brevet promotion to major.

== Start of career ==
After the war, Spooner served as private secretary to Wisconsin Governor Lucius Fairchild, and then the governor's military secretary with the rank of colonel He later served as quartermaster general of the Wisconsin Militia with the rank of brigadier general. He studied law with his father from 1865 to 1867, and he was admitted to the bar in 1867.

After becoming a lawyer, Spooner was appointed assistant attorney general of Wisconsin and he served from 1869 to 1870. In 1869, Spooner received the honorary degree of Master of Arts from the University of Wisconsin. Spooner moved to Hudson in 1870, and practiced law there from 1870 to 1884. He established himself in the field of railroad and corporation law, and served as counsel for the West Wisconsin Railway and Chicago, St. Paul and Minneapolis Railway.

Spooner was a member of the Wisconsin State Assembly in 1872. He was a member of the University of Wisconsin Board of Regents from 1882 to 1886.

== United States Senator ==
He was elected as a Republican to the United States Senate January 27, 1885, and served from 1885 to 1891, being defeated for re-election by William F. Vilas. He served as chairman of the Committee on Claims from 1886 to 1891.

In 1888 and again in 1892, Spooner was a delegate to the Republican National Convention and was the chairman of Wisconsin's delegation. Spooner was the unsuccessful Republican nominee for governor of Wisconsin in 1892. After his election defeat, he moved to Madison and resumed practicing law in 1893.

In 1897, Spooner was elected to the U.S. Senate, succeeding Vilas. He was reelected in 1903, and served from 1897 until his resignation in 1907. He served as chairman of the Committee on Canadian Relations from 1897 to 1899 and of the Committee on Rules from 1899 to 1907.

As a Senator, Spooner was credited with the Sherman Antitrust Act of 1890 provision that enabled the government to prosecute Standard Oil. He also promoted the legislation which created a civil government for the Philippines following the Spanish–American War. He was the author of the Spooner Act, which gave President Theodore Roosevelt authority to purchase the Panama Canal Zone. A popular figure among Republicans, he turned down three cabinet posts during his political career: Secretary of the Interior in President William McKinley's administration in 1898, Attorney General under President McKinley in 1901, and Secretary of State in President William Howard Taft's administration in 1909.

Spooner and fellow Wisconsin Senator, Robert M. La Follette, were known to be bitter rivals. Spooner disagreed with La Follette's progressive policies, which were opposed to his own conservative policies. Spooner was also one of the early opponents of direct primary elections. At the time, party nominees were selected by the party officials, sometimes by party bosses. Spooner's view of political campaigns if direct primaries became standard was:

Direct primaries would destroy the party machinery ... and would build up a lot of personal machines, and would make every man a self-seeker, and would degrade politics by turning candidacies into bitter personal wrangles.

Spooner shocked the state of Wisconsin and much of the American political world with his sudden resignation in March 1907. In his letter to the Governor, he explained that he felt the need to return to the legal profession in order to build a financial cushion to provide for his retirement and his heirs. He also noted that he had only two years left in his term and did not plan to seek re-election anyway. Members of the political media also speculated that Spooner had timed his resignation to catch the La Follette faction off guard and unprepared for a Senate campaign.

On hearing of his resignation, President Roosevelt remarked, "I can not sufficiently express my regret at Senator Spooner's resignation. We lose one of the ablest, most efficient, most fearless, and most upright public servants that the nation has had."

== Later life ==
After his retirement from the Senate, he practiced law in New York City. In 1910, Spooner and Joseph P. Cotton formed the firm of Spooner & Cotton, where Spooner practiced until his death.

== Death and burial ==
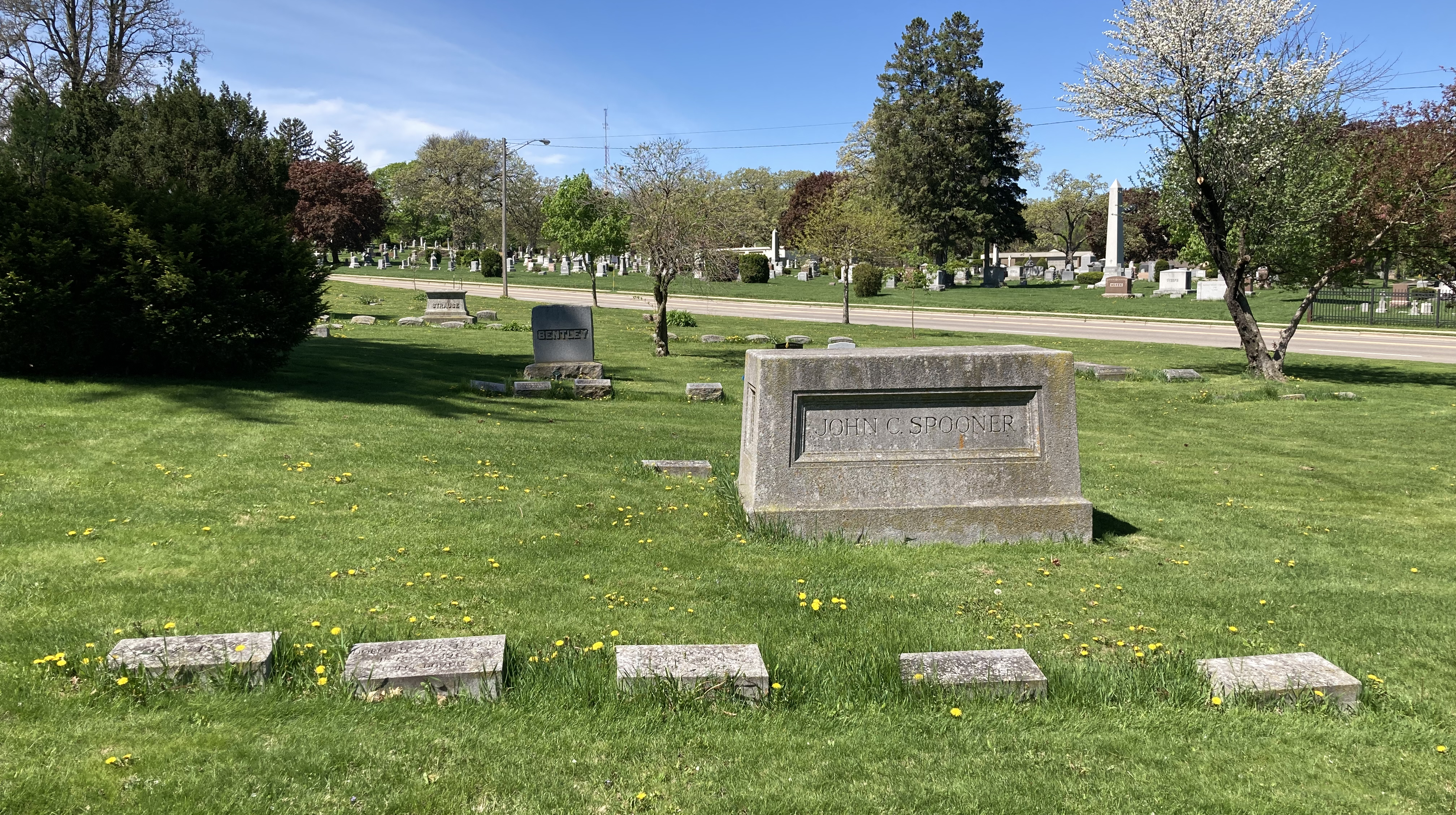
Spooner's grave at Forest Hill Cemetery

Spooner died on June 11, 1919, at his home on 205 West 57th Street in Manhattan, following a nervous breakdown. He was interred in Forest Hill Cemetery in Madison, Wisconsin.

== Awards and honors ==
The town of Spooner, Wisconsin was named in his honor. Spooner received the honorary degree of LL.D. from the University of Wisconsin in 1894. He also received honorary LL.D. degrees from Yale University in 1908 and Columbia University (1909).

== Family ==
In 1868, Spooner married Annie Main of Madison. They were the parents of four children, three of whom lived to adulthood—Charles Philip Spooner (1869–1947), Willet Main Spooner (1871–1928), John C. Spooner (1877–1881), and Philip Loring Spooner (1879–1945).

== See also ==
- Spooner Act
- Panama Canal Zone

Party political offices
Preceded by William D. Hoard	Republican nominee for Governor of Wisconsin; 1892	Succeeded by William H. Upham
U.S. Senate
Preceded by Angus Cameron	U.S. senator (Class 3) from Wisconsin; March 4, 1885 – March 3, 1891; Served alongside: Philetus Sawyer	Succeeded by William F. Vilas
Preceded by William F. Vilas	U.S. senator (Class 3) from Wisconsin; March 4, 1897 – April 30, 1907; Served alongside: John L. Mitchell, Joseph V. Quarles and Robert M. La Follette, Sr.	Succeeded by Isaac Stephenson
Preceded by Nelson W. Aldrich	Chair of the Senate Rules Committee; March 4, 1899 – April 30, 1907	Succeeded by Philander C. Knox
