= George Weeks (politician) =

American politician (1836–1905)

George Weeks (December 1, 1836 – April 25, 1905) was a member of the Wisconsin State Assembly.

== Biography ==
Weeks was born on December 1, 1836, in Brownville, New York. He moved to Concord, Wisconsin in 1850 before settling in York, Dane County, Wisconsin in 1852. There, he made a living as a farmer. On December 9, 1860, Weeks married Helen Manning (1843–1918).

During the American Civil War, he initially enlisted with the 29th Wisconsin Volunteer Infantry Regiment of the Union Army. Later, he was commissioned an officer before resigning due to ill health. In 1864, he joined the 36th Wisconsin Volunteer Infantry Regiment. Conflicts Weeks took part in include the Battle of Cold Harbor. After the war, he was promoted to captain.

== Political career ==
Weeks was a member of the Assembly during the 1877 session. Other positions he held include chairman (similar to Mayor) and supervisor of York. He was a Republican.

In 1885 he became sheriff of Dane County, and later he was warden at the state penitentiary at Waupun. After a driving accident in 1899 he became an invalid. He died at his home in Marshall, Wisconsin on April 25, 1905, and he is buried in Sun Prairie.
