= Chicago, Madison and Northern Railroad =

Chicago, Madison and Northern Railroad may refer to:

- Chicago, Madison and Northern Railroad (1886–1903), predecessor of the Illinois Central Railroad
- Chicago, Madison and Northern Railway, predecessor of the Wisconsin and Southern Railroad
