= James L. Hill =

American politician (1834–1888)

James L. Hill (1834 – 1888) was Mayor of Madison, Wisconsin. He held the office from 1872 to 1873.
