= Charles W. Heyl =

American politician

Charles Wendel Heyl (May 14, 1857 – January 20, 1936) was an American businessman, fire chief, and politician.

Born in Philadelphia, Pennsylvania, Heyl and his parents moved to Madison, Wisconsin in 1857. Heyl went to the public schools in Madison and then worked for his father as a tinsmith. Heyl then worked for Chicago and Northwestern Railroad. Heyl owned a hotel and cigar shop in Madison. In 1890, Heyl served on the Madison Common Council and served as president of the common council. He also served on the board of education. He was a Democrat. In 1893, Heyl served in the Wisconsin State Assembly. From 1907 to 1929, Heyl was the fire chief of the Madison Fire Department. Heyl died at his home, in Madison, Wisconsin, after a long illness.
