= Neely Gray =

American politician

Neely Gray (February 25, 1810 – May 15, 1867) was an American businessman and politician.

Born in what is now Brooke County, West Virginia, Gray moved to Pennsylvania and worked as a millwright. In 1835, Gray moved to Platteville, Michigan Territory. He served in the Wisconsin Territorial House of Representatives in 1840 and 1842 as a Whig. He then served in the first Wisconsin Constitutional Convention of 1846. After going to California for a brief time, Gray settled in Madison, Wisconsin, where he had a storage and commission business and later a coal yard. In 1866, he served on the Dane County, Wisconsin Board of Supervisors, but resigned due to ill health. Gray died in Madison, Wisconsin.
