= Philip Loring Spooner =

20th century American singer

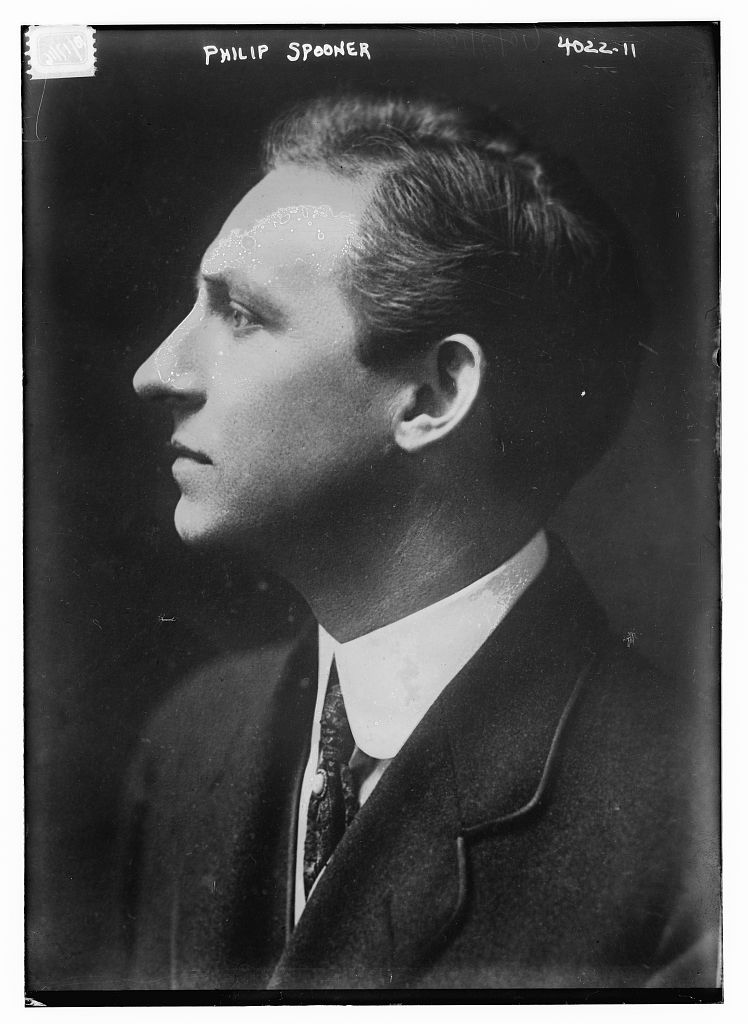
- Spooner circa 1915
- Born: October 5, 1879; Hudson, Wisconsin, U.S.
- Died: May 16, 1945 (aged 65); New York City, U.S.
- Resting place: Forest Hill Cemetery, Madison, Wisconsin
- Education: University of Wisconsin
- Occupation: Singer
- Father: John Coit Spooner

Philip Loring Spooner (October 5, 1879 – May 16, 1945) was an American tenor.

== Biography ==
He was born on October 5, 1879, in Hudson, Wisconsin, to John Coit Spooner and Anne Elizabeth Maine.

He attended Columbia Preparatory School in Washington, D.C., then the University of Wisconsin. He debuted as a professional singer in Boston, Massachusetts, in 1913. In 1916 he was arrested for assaulting a cab driver with his walking stick. While in detention he sang Mother Macree to the other detainees.

He never married and resided with his mother until her death in 1930. He died on May 16, 1945.
