= John R. Baltzell =

American politician (1827–1893)

17th Mayor of Madison, Wisconsin
- In office 1879–1880
- Preceded by: George Baldwin Smith
- Succeeded by: Philip L. Spooner Jr.

Personal details
- Born: July 2, 1827
- Died: July 18, 1893 (aged 66)
- Occupation: Politician

John R. Baltzell (July 2, 1827 – July 18, 1893) was an American politician who served as the 17th mayor of Madison, Wisconsin, from 1879 to 1880.
